= Organisation Undoing Tax Abuse =

- Formation: 30 April 2012; 14 years ago
- Founded at: Johannesburg
- Type: Non-profit company
- Purpose: Anti-corruption advocacy Government accountability
- Headquarters: Unit 4, Boskruin Village Office Park, Cnr President Fouche & Hawken Road, Johannesburg, South Africa
- Region served: South Africa
- Key people: Wayne Duvenage (CEO)
- Revenue: R40.3 million (FY 2020/21)
- Expenses: R40 million (2020/21)
- Staff: 44 (2020/21)
- Website: OUTA.co.za

Organisation Undoing Tax Abuse (OUTA) is a registered non-profit Civil Action Organisation, located in Johannesburg, South Africa. The anti-corruption advocacy organisation focuses on tackling government corruption and misappropriation of public funds. It is crowd funded by the public and businesses within the Republic of South Africa.

== Mission ==
OUTA's mission is to be a trusted vehicle for positive change, promoting and advancing the South African Constitution and other democratic processes by:

- Challenging and taking action against maladministration and corruption and where possible, holding those personally responsible to account for their conduct and actions.
- Challenging policy and the regulatory environment as and when deemed as irrational, unfit or ineffective for their intended purpose.
- Working with communities and authorities in improving administration and service delivery, within all spheres of Government.

Remaining apolitical, OUTA relies on funding from the public, business and other donor institutions, to perform their work through investigation, research, communication, empowerment and litigation.

== Activities ==
OUTA has chosen to focus its efforts on the South African government's management of parastatal entities: Eskom, South African Airways, the South African Broadcasting Corporation and the South African National Roads Agency. This focus is due to the Auditor-General revealing a fivefold increase in irregular spending from 2007 to 2015, with much of the unaccounted-for expenditure taking place at the subnational level.

OUTA is currently involved in a number of investigations, many of which centre around those involved in state capture and corruption related to politically connected officials and business individuals.

== History ==
OUTA was initially established in early 2012 as the Opposition Against Urban Tolling Alliance, an association of business organisations that grouped together to challenge the South African Government's plan to introduce an urban electronic toll collection, e-toll (South Africa), in the province of Gauteng.

=== Rule of Law Campaign ===
In 2015 OUTA launched its Rule of Law campaign which undertook to challenge the scheme by launching a crowd funded "eToll Defence Umbrella" to defend road users who defied the scheme, in the event that the South African National Roads Agency (SANRAL) issued summonses against defaulters. OUTA's campaign challenged Government's claims, exposed public complaints and system weaknesses, which in turn generated a civil disobedience campaign that reduced eToll payment compliance from 40% in June 2014 to around 25% by 2020.

=== Mandate expansion and name change ===
In February 2016, OUTA changed its name to Organisation Undoing Tax Abuse, to accommodate the expansion of its mandate to challenge corruption and maladministration in the South African Government and its state-owned entities.

=== No Room To Hide: A President Caught in the Act ===
In June 2017, OUTA provided insights and proof of state capture and corruption to Parliament by releasing its ‘No Room To Hide: A President Caught in the Act’ report, which largely implicated the disgraced former President Jacob Zuma. Leading up to the vote of no confidence in President Zuma in August 2017, OUTA published its ‘No Room To Hide: A President Caught in the Act’ report, which was a narrative complication of the Gupta leaks which linked him to state capture.

=== Treason, fraud, theft and corruption charges ===
Evidence in the ‘No Room To Hide: A President Caught in the Act’ report lead OUTA to lay treason charges against Public Enterprises director general Mogokare Richard Seleke and Communications Minister Faith Muthambi, fraud and theft charges against Mineral Resources Minister Mosebenzi Zwane, and corruption and fraud charges against Malusi Gigaba as the former Minister of Home Affairs. Several commissions of inquiry insured into the officials influence by the Gupta family.

=== Judicial commission of Inquiry into allegations of state capture ===
In 2018 The Judicial Commission of Inquiry into Allegations of State Capture began its public hearings. OUTA made its first submission to the Zondo Commission on Monday 17 September 2018.

=== Delinquent director ===
In March 2017, OUTA and the South African Airways Pilots' Association (SAAPA) brought an application in the Pretoria High Court for an order to declare Dudu Myeni a Delinquent Director, based on her conduct and actions during her five-year term as chairperson of the South African Airways (SAA) board. On 27 May 2020 Pretoria High Court Judge Ronel Tolmay declared Myeni a delinquent director and banned her from holding any directorship position for life. Myeni was ordered to pay all legal costs of the action. The judgement and evidence has been referred to the National Prosecuting Authority so a criminal case can be pursued.

== See also ==
- Corruption in South Africa
- Gupta family
- The Judicial Commission of Inquiry into Allegations of State Capture
- State capture
