= Delinquent =

Delinquent may refer to:

- Delinquent (royalist), Royalists whose estates had been seized during the English Civil War
- A juvenile delinquent, often shortened as delinquent, a young person (under 18) who fails to do that which is required by law

== See also ==
- The Delinquents (disambiguation)
- Delinquent director, a person found guilty of serious misconduct in South African company law
