= Duvenage =

Duvenage is a surname. Notable people with the surname include:

- Dewaldt Duvenage (born 1988), South African rugby union footballer
- Wayne Duvenage (born 1960), South African businessman, entrepreneur, and civil activist

== See also ==
- Duvenhage lyssavirus
