= Thomas Kgokolo =

South African accountant and corporate executive

- Born: 1978 (age 47–48); South Africa
- Education: University of South Africa (Bachelor of Computing); University of Pretoria (Bachelor of Commerce in Accounting); Gordon Institute of Business Science (Master of Business Administration); South African Institute of Chartered Accountants (Chartered Accountant of South Africa)
- Occupations: Accountant, Businessman and Corporate Executive
- Years active: 1996–present
- Known for: Professional competence
- Title: Interim CEO of South African Airways
- Predecessor: Philip Saunders

Thomas Kgokolo is a South African chartered accountant, businessman, and corporate executive. He was appointed the interim CEO of South African Airways, the national airline company of South Africa, effective 13 April 2021.

== Background and education ==
Kgokolo holds a Bachelor of Computing degree from the University of South Africa (UNISA). He also holds a degree of Bachelor of Commerce in Accounting, awarded by the University of Pretoria. His degree of Master of Business Administration (MBA), was obtained from the Gordon Institute of Business Science. In addition he is a Chartered Accountant of South Africa, recognized by the South African Institute of Chartered Accountants.

== Career ==
Thomas Kgokolo served as the Deputy Chairperson of the Board of Trustees, at the Mineworkers Provident Fund (MWPF), in South Africa. He also serves as the Chairperson of the Audit and Risk Committee (ARC) of the MWPF. In these two roles, he oversees the audit functions of the said fund, including the preparations of its annual financial statements.

Since 2018, he serves as a non-executive director at the Air Traffic Navigation Systems SOC Limited. He also serves on the "Audit Committee, Procurement, Research & Development committees at the same entity". Kgokolo is also a member of the permanent faculty at the Gordon Institute of Business Studies, where he lectures on corporate finance to the students on the MBA program.

In April 2021, he was appointed CEO at South Africa's national career airline, South African Airways. He is responsible for preparation of the airline to transition from "business rescue proceedings", since December 2019 to "re-entry into the market", according to the airline's board of directors.
