= The Delinquents =

The Delinquents may refer to:

== Films ==
- The Delinquents (1957 film), an American drama film directed by Robert Altman
- The Delinquents (1960 film), a Spanish drama film
- The Delinquents (1976 film), an Egyptian film directed by Niazi Mustafa
- The Delinquents (1989 film), an Australian coming-of-age drama based on the 1962 novel
- The Delinquents (2023 film), an internationally co-producted heist comedy-drama film

== Other uses ==
- The Delinquents, a 1962 novel by Criena Rohan
- The Delinquents (group), an American rap group
- The Delinquents (punk band), American punk band

== See also ==
- Delinquent (disambiguation)
