= Wayne Duvenage =

South African businessman, entrepreneur and civil activist

Wayne Llewellyn Duvenage
- Born: January 3, 1960 (age 66); Salisbury Southern Rhodesia
- Education: University of KwaZulu-Natal
- Occupations: Businessman, entrepreneur, civil activist
- Employer: Organisation Undoing Tax Abuse

Wayne Llewellyn Duvenage (born 3 January 1960 in Salisbury, Southern Rhodesia) is a South African businessman, entrepreneur and civil activist. He is currently the CEO of the South African corruption-fighting civil action organisation, Organisation Undoing Tax Abuse (OUTA), involved in fighting corruption and maladministration across all spheres of government in South Africa.

A BSc. Graduate of University of KwaZulu-Natal, Duvenage has 28 years experience in the travel and tourism industry. During his corporate career, he was Chief Executive of Avis Car Rental South Africa, president of the South African Vehicle Rental and Leasing Association (SAVRALA) and has held positions on both the boards of Tourism Marketing SA (TOMSA) and Tourism Business Council SA (TBCSA).

Duvenage joined OUTA as CEO in 2012 when it was a single-issue organisation – Opposition to Urban Tolling Alliance – aimed at resisting government plans to introduce electronic urban toll collection in the Gauteng province.

He is co-author with Angelique Serrao of 'The E-Toll Saga: A Journey from CEO to Civil Activist'.
