= South African Airways =

National airline of South Africa

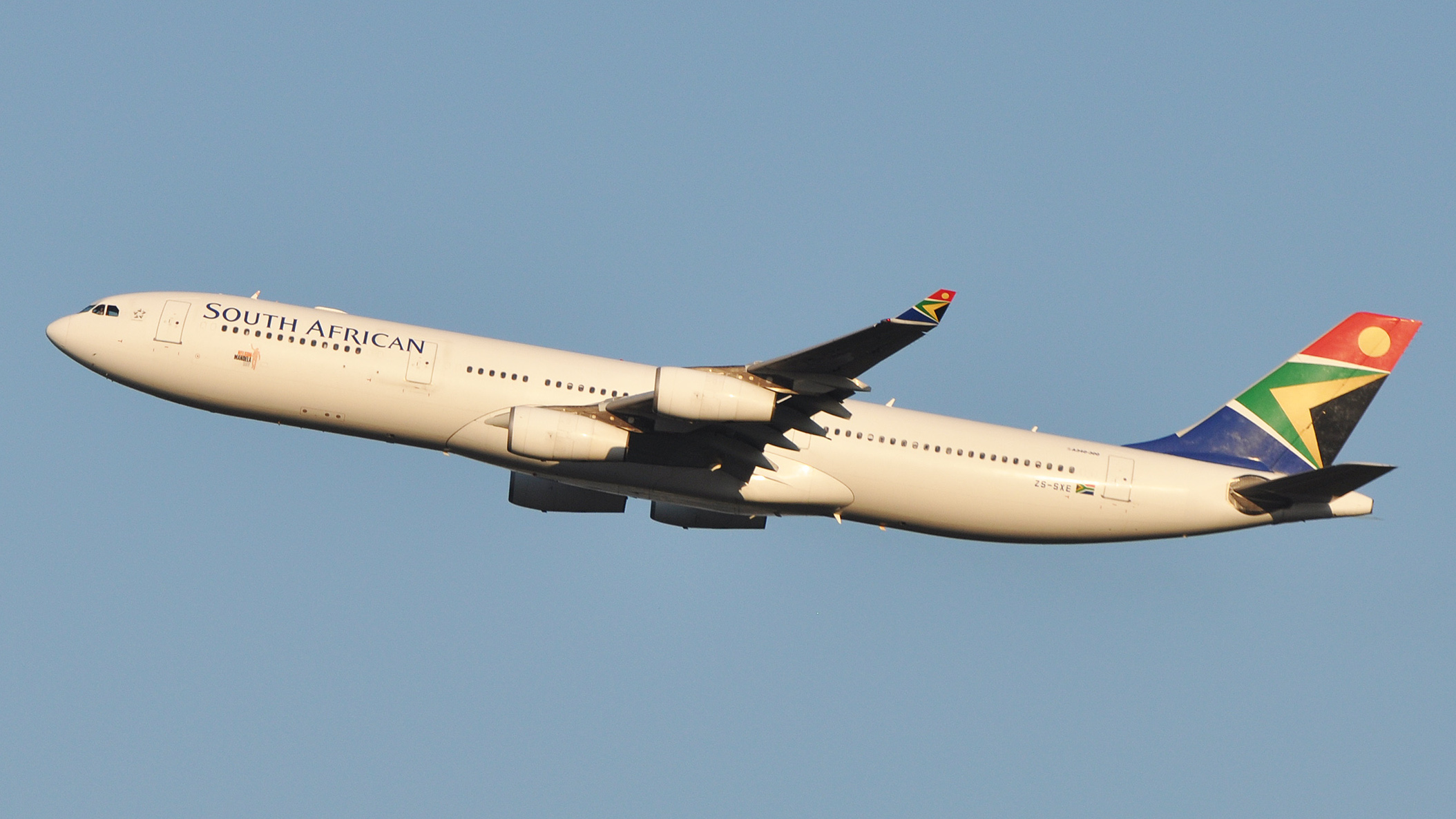
IATA	ICAO	Call sign
SA	SAA	SPRINGBOK
- Founded: 24 July 1929; 97 years ago (as Union Airways)
- Hubs: O. R. Tambo International Airport
- Secondary hubs: Cape Town International Airport
- Frequent-flyer program: Voyager
- Alliance: Star Alliance
- Subsidiaries: Air Chefs; South African Airways Cargo; South African Airways Technical
- Fleet size: 19 (2026)
- Destinations: 18 (2026)
- Parent company: Government of South Africa
- Headquarters: Airways Park, O. R. Tambo International Airport, Johannesburg, Gauteng, South Africa
- Key people: Koekie Mbeki (Acting Group CEO); Sedzani Faith Mudau (Chairperson)
- Revenue: ▲ R8.84 billion (2025)
- Operating income: ▲ R336 million (2025)
- Net income: ▲ R155 million (2025)
- Total assets: ▲ R16.065 billion (2025)
- Total equity: ▲ R6.65 billion (2025)
- Employees: 3,422 (2025)
- Website: flysaa.com

South African Airways (SAA; Afrikaans: Suid-Afrikaanse Lugdiens, SAL (Note: Though Suid-Afrikaanse Lugdiens is no longer used for Afrikaans marketing in post-apartheid.)) is the flag carrier of South Africa. Founded in 1929 as Union Airways it later rebranded to South African Airways in 1934. As of February 2026, SAA flies to 17 destinations, operating a fleet of 19 aircraft (with plans to increase its fleet size to 21).

SAA is headquartered in Airways Park at O. R. Tambo International Airport in Johannesburg and operates a hub-and-spoke network, serving 13 destinations in Africa and two intercontinental destinations to Perth, Australia and São Paulo, Brazil. The carrier joined Star Alliance in April 2006, making it the first African carrier to sign with one of the three major airline alliances.

The airline entered voluntary business rescue in December 2019 as a result of financial difficulties, and suspended all operations the following year. In June 2021, the South African government announced that SAA would be partially privatised in a Strategic Equity Partnership (SEP) transaction with the Takatso Consortium, which would hold a 51% controlling stake and 49% remaining with the State.

After almost three years of protracted negotiations, the government terminated the SEP with Takatso, reverting back to the status quo of a 100% state-owned SAA. The South African Civil Aviation Authority confirmed on 4 August 2021 that SAA's air operator's certificate had been reissued with an approved fleet of eight aircraft.

The airline restarted operations on 23 September 2021, despite not having concluded the investment agreement with the proposed private partners. Nonetheless, SAA was recognised as the second best airline in Africa by Skytrax in 2021, despite not having flown a single scheduled flight for 18 months.

Since emerging from business rescue, SAA has grown steadily, increasing in terms of fleet size, destinations services, and number of employees. After regaining profitability in its 2024 financial year, the airline posted a R155 million profit for its 2025 financial year, with total revenue generated amounting to R8.8 bilion – a 35.9% increase year-over-year.

== History ==
=== Formation and early years ===
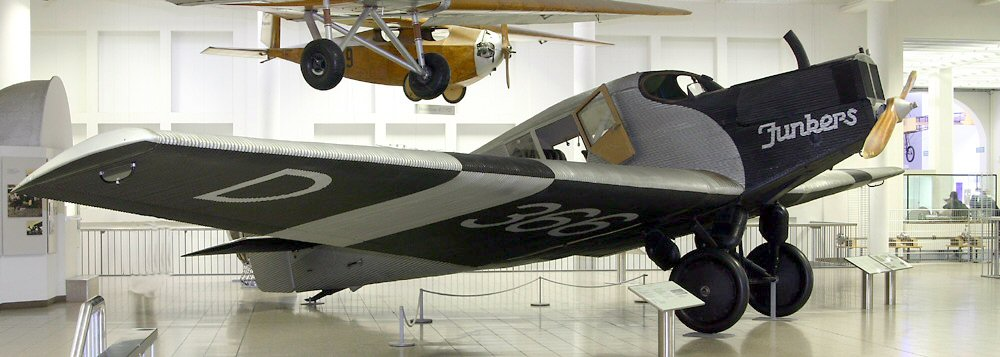
SAA started operations with a number of acquired Union Airways aircraft, including the Junkers F.13, similar to the one pictured.

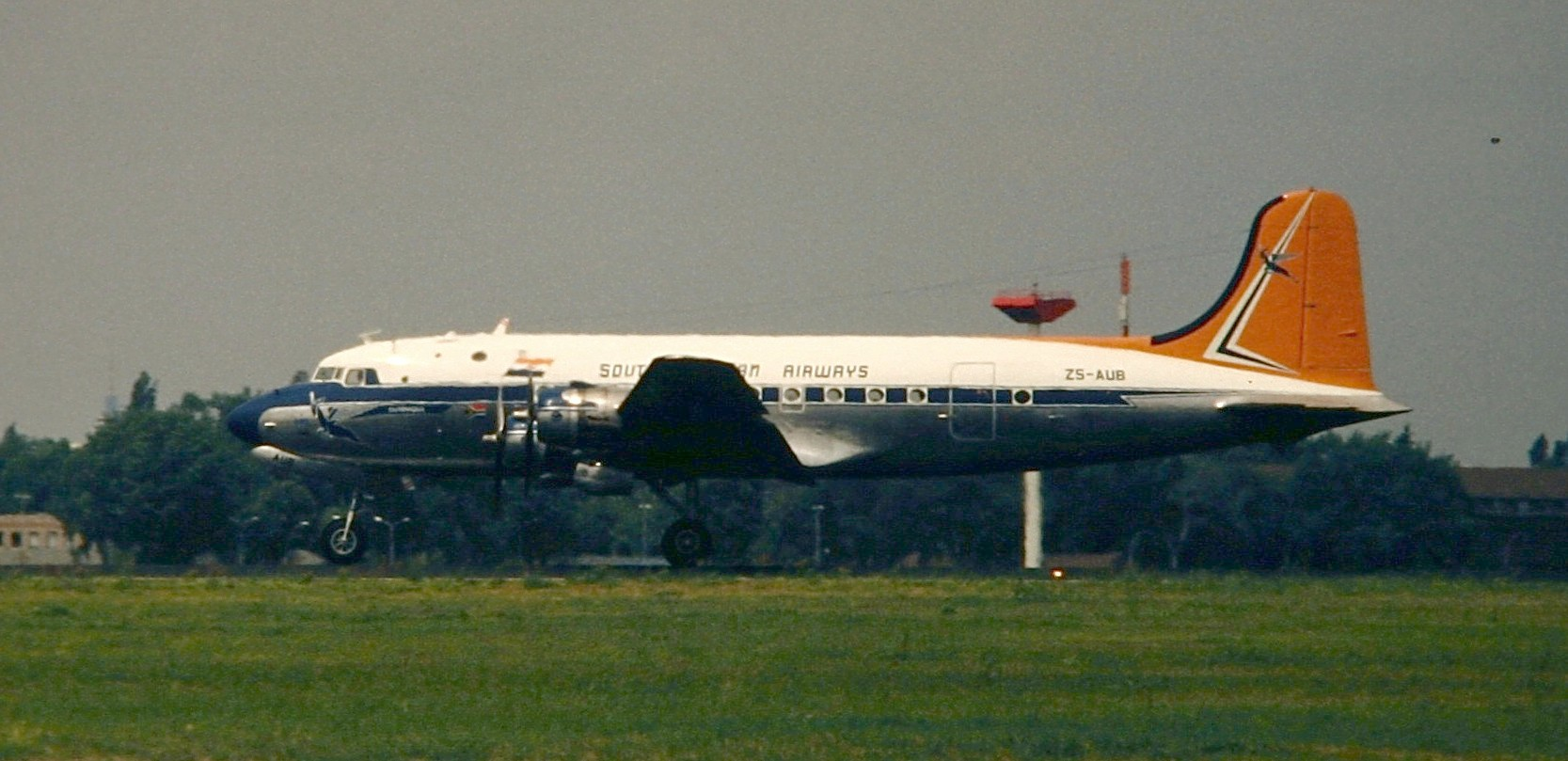
The Douglas DC-4 Skymaster was introduced in May 1946, on which SAA's first in-flight films were shown. This aircraft, registration ZS-AUB, is in Berlin (May 2000).

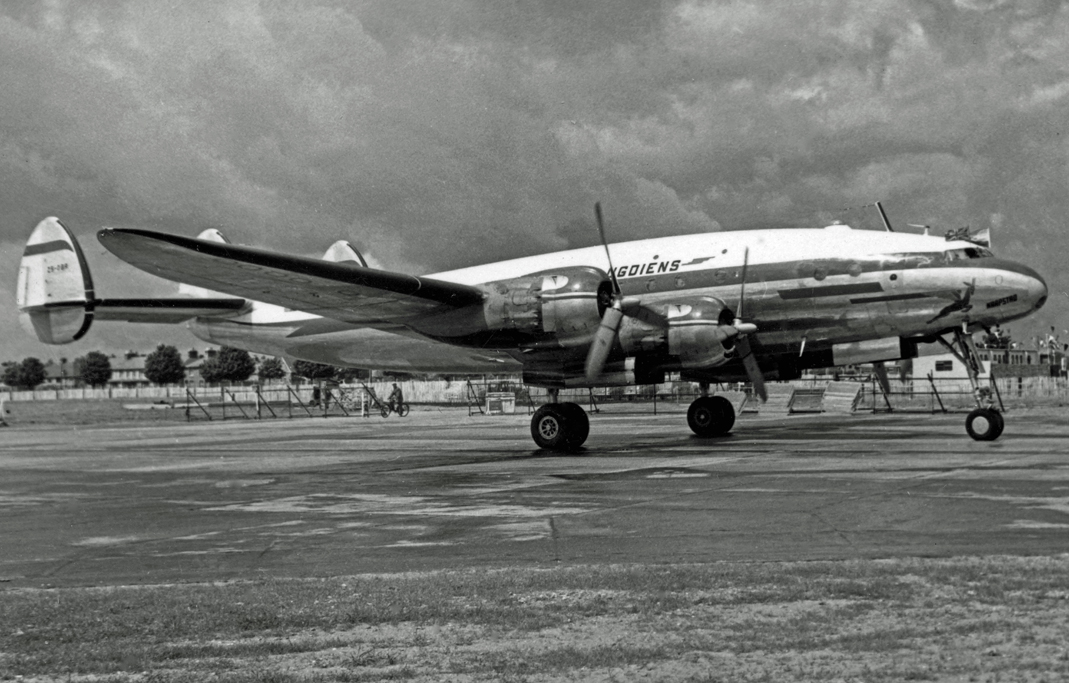
SAA Lockheed Constellation arriving at Heathrow in 1953

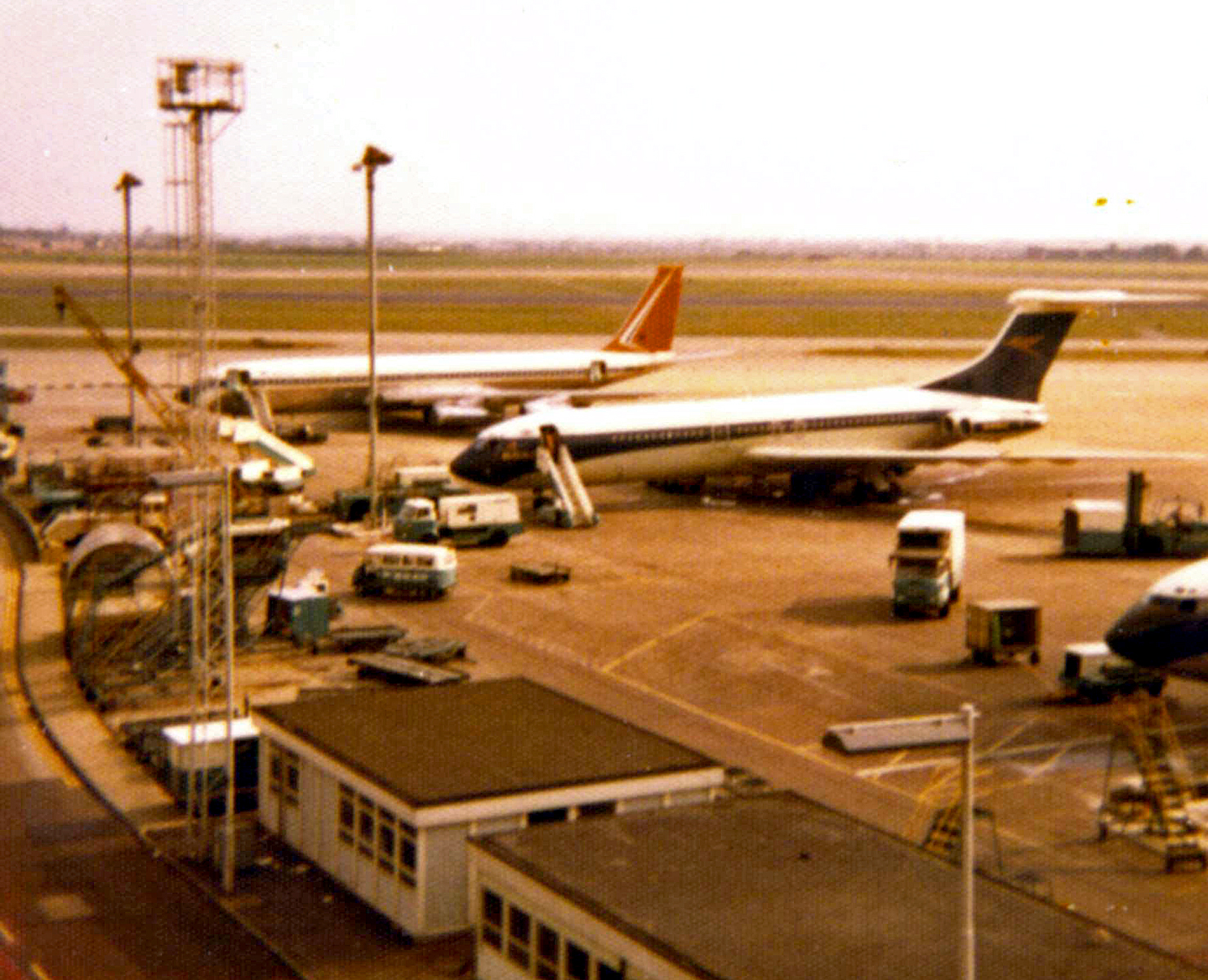
An SAA Boeing 707 sits alongside a BOAC Vickers VC10 at London Heathrow Airport (1977).

South African Airways was formed on 1 February 1934 following the rebranding and acquisition of Union Airways by the South African government. Forty staff members, along with one de Havilland DH.60 Gypsy Moth, one de Havilland DH.80A Puss Moth, three Junkers F.13s and a leased Junkers F13 and Junkers A50 were among the acquired aircraft.

Upon acquisition, the government changed the airline's name to South African Airways. It then came under control of the South African Railways and Harbours Administration (now Transnet). Charter operations started that year.

On 1 February the following year, the carrier acquired Suidwes Lugdiens / South West Airways (now Air Namibia), which had since 1932 been providing a weekly air-mail service between Windhoek and Kimberley. During this time, SAA ordered three Junkers Ju 52/3m aircraft, which were delivered in October 1934 and entered service 10 days later. These aircraft were configured to carry 14 passengers, along with four crew. They enabled thrice-weekly Durban–Johannesburg services, with weekly services on the Durban–East London–Port Elizabeth–George/Mossel Bay–Cape Town route.

On 1 July 1935, SAA moved its operations to Rand Airport as it became increasingly obvious that Johannesburg would become the country's aviation hub, which coincided with the launching of Rand–Durban–East London–Port Elizabeth–Cape Town services. From July the following year a weekly Rand–Kimberley–Beaufort West–Cape Town service commenced; in April 1936, all Rand–Cape Town services were taken over from Imperial Airways. A fourth Ju 52/3m soon joined the fleet.

Orders for a further ten Ju 52/3m aircraft, along with eighteen Junkers Ju 86s and seven Airspeed Envoys (four for the airline and three for the South African Air Force) were placed. This raised the number of Ju 52s to fourteen, although three older models were sold when deliveries of the newer Ju 52s began.

The airline experienced a rapid expansion during this time, but also suffered its first accident; one of the newly delivered Ju 52s crashed after takeoff from Rand Airport in July 1937, with one reported fatality. From 1 February 1934 until the start of World War II, SAA carried 118,822 passengers, 3,278 tonnes of airmail and 248 tonnes of cargo, which were served by 418 employees. On 24 May 1940, all operations were suspended.

Following World War II, frequencies were increased and more routes were opened, which necessitated the conversion of three South African Air Force Envoys to passenger layout. These aircraft would prove to be unsuitable for passenger and cargo services and were returned to the SAAF after the arrival of the Junkers Ju 86s. The main aircraft of SAA in the 1930s was the Junkers Ju 52. Other types used in the 1930s included eighteen Junkers Ju 86s, which served from 1937 onwards.

The slow growth continued during the 1940s, though the airline was effectively closed for the duration of World War II. In 1944, SAA began operating 28 Lockheed Lodestars to restart domestic services and by 1948 SAA operating nineteen examples. These were withdrawn in 1955.

On 10 November 1945, SAA achieved a longtime company goal by operating a route to Europe when an Avro York landed in Bournemouth, England, after the long flight from Palmietfontein Airport near Johannesburg. These were replaced by the Douglas DC-4 from 1946 onwards, which in turn was replaced by the Lockheed Constellation on international routes in 1950. Also of note in the postwar era was the DC-3 Dakota, of which eight served with SAA, the last example being withdrawn as late as 1970.

=== Growth: 1946–1952 ===
On 10 November 1945, the airline introduced its first intercontinental service, the 3-day Springbok Service, operated by the Avro York, which was routed Palmietfontein–Nairobi–Khartoum–Cairo–Castel Benito–Hurn Bournemouth. A weekly service was initially flown, but this later increased to 6 times weekly due to high passenger demand. The Douglas DC-4 Skymaster debuted with SAA in May 1946 between Johannesburg and Cape Town, which coincided with the introduction of the Douglas DC-3 on the Johannesburg–Durban route.

From 1946, passengers and cargo carried increased, along with the size of SAA's fleet and staff. As the Skymasters arrived, out went the Avro Yorks, back to BOAC. Air hostesses were introduced in September 1946: at first on domestic routes, then on Springbok Services. The two de Havilland Doves were introduced at the end of the year; these aircraft were utilised on internal services for a short time and were sold within a few years. The 28-seat Vickers Viking served the airline briefly, before being sold to British European Airways.

Palmietfontein Airport replaced Rand Airport as SAA's hub in 1948. In June 1948, SAA began to show films on its Skymaster aircraft. SAA received four Lockheed Constellations, its first pressurised aircraft, in August 1950. They provided scheduled service to London's Heathrow airport. Initially, the route from Johannesburg was flown via Nairobi, Khartoum and Rome. The Constellation's higher speed and longer range enabled fewer stops and greatly reduced the flying time to London.

=== The Jet Age: 1953–1973 ===
The jet age arrived in South Africa on 3 May 1952 when a BOAC de Havilland Comet arrived in Palmietfontein after a 24-hour journey from England with five refuelling stops en route. SAA chartered two Comets from the British airline on 4 October 1953, when Comet G-ANAV left London for Johannesburg. On the same day, Tourist Class was introduced on the 58-seat Lockheed Constellation used on the Springbok Service. The two chartered aircraft sported both BOAC and SAA titles and logos, but were operated by SAA crews.

In 1956, SAA introduced the Douglas DC-7B, capable of long-range operations and then probably the fastest piston-engine airliner in the world. SAA exploited the aircraft's performance by introducing it between Johannesburg and London with only one fuelling stop at Khartoum. This was known as the East Coast express, taking 21 hours to complete, versus BOAC's inaugural Comet flight between the two cities of 24 hours. This later became the West Coast express when the technical stop at Khartoum was transferred to Kano, Nigeria, resulting in a shortened flying of 18 hours. The fortnightly Wallaby Route, routed Johannesburg–Mauritius–Cocos Islands–Perth, Australia, started in November 1957.

After a host of accidents involving SAA's and other airlines' Comets, the airline ordered three Boeing 707-320 Intercontinentals on 21 February 1958, with the first delivered on 1 July 1960. Three months after arrival, on 1 October 1960, the Boeing 707 was deployed on the airline's flagship Springbok Service, trimming the flying time to London to 13 hours.

Other changes brought about by the 707 were a livery change, to an orange tail with blue and white markings, as well as improved comfort, range and speed. A 707 replaced the DC-7B on the Wallaby Route in 1967; Cocos Islands was dropped, while Sydney became the terminus. Flights to New York, via Rio de Janeiro, started on 23 February 1969 using a 707. The first 707 of SAA landed in Europe in October 1961 with a nine-hour flight to Athens.

The jets arrived during a period when most African countries, except SA's neighbours, denied South African airlines the use of their airspace, necessitating long detours. In 1967 the Skymasters, Constellations and DC-7Bs were being retired, replaced by the Boeing 727 trijet the following year to complement the Boeing 707. The choice of 727 was based on the geography of the destinations to which it would fly; for example Johannesburg is 1,694 metres (5,558 ft) high and hot, where the 727's wings and other technical capabilities enable it to operate out of such airports.

Revenue passenger-kilometres, scheduled flights only (millions)
Year	Traffic
1950	197
1955	331
1960	489
1965	1,144
1969	2,168
1971	3,070
1975	5,942
1980	8,843
1985	8,683
2000	19,321

On 13 March 1968, SAA ordered five Boeing 747-200Bs. The first, Lebombo, was delivered on 22 October 1971 after a 3-stop flight from Seattle. It was placed into service in December and proved very popular. SAA eventually operated 23 brand-new "Jumbo Jets", including the −200M (first delivered in 1980), −300 (1983), −400, and the long-range Boeing 747SP, first delivered on 18–19 March 1976, with a nonstop delivery flight of ZS-SPA from Everett, Washington, USA to Cape Town.

The 747SP, especially, was acquired to overcome the refusal of many countries to allow SAA to use their airspace by exploiting its long-range capabilities, as well as to serve lower-density routes which were unsuited to the 747-200. Six were delivered starting 19 March 1976. As above, to demonstrate the 747SP's performance, the first one was delivered from Seattle to Cape Town non-stop, an airliner distance record that stood until 1989. The first 747SP arrived in South Africa on 19 March 1976.

As the 747 entered service, its smaller siblings, the 707s, were converted to combi (passenger/cargo) configurations and high-density seating. All of SAA's Vickers Viscounts were sold by March 1972 after being replaced by Boeing 737s.

=== Expansion: 1974–1983 ===
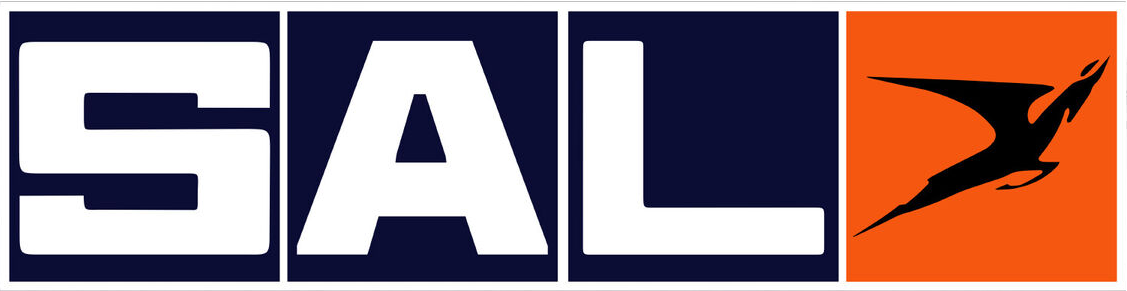
The SAA logo from 1971 to 1997. SAL is an abbreviation of the airlines' former Afrikaans name, Suid-Afrikaanse Lugdiens.

SAA opened a route to Asia, with Boeing 707 flights to Hong Kong via an intermediate stop at the Seychelles Islands in June 1974. In 1980, SAA began nonstop flights to Taipei using a Boeing 747SP; Mauritius had earlier replaced the Seychelles for the Hong Kong service. South Africa became one of the few countries in the world to recognise the government of the Republic of China on Taiwan.

Because some African countries denied SAA the use of their airspace, SAA bypassed the 'bulge' of Africa, usually via Ilha do Sal - a detour of almost 3,000 kilometres (1,900 mi). Another bypass was via Tel Aviv, which doubled the distance and flying time involved. European airlines were allowed to fly over Africa when flying to South Africa, usually via Nairobi and later nonstop.

On 26 December 1980, the last South African Airways Boeing 707 service was operated between Paris and Johannesburg. Its touchdown ended the 20-year career of the 707. The quadjet was replaced by the world's first wide-body twinjet, the Airbus A300, which had entered revenue service in 1976. The 727s were eliminated by 1983, replaced by the more economical Boeing 737. When countries withdrew landing rights for SAA, the airline leased its aircraft and crews to Canada, Mauritius, Brazil, Morocco and Luxembourg.

=== Effect of apartheid: 1985–1990 ===
Due to international opposition to apartheid during the 1980s, SAA's offices were attacked. In Harare, Zimbabwe, its offices were badly damaged after protesters went on a rampage.

The US Comprehensive Anti-Apartheid Act of 1986 banned all flights by South African–owned carriers, including SAA. In 1987, SAA's services to Perth and Sydney in Australia were ended, in light of the Australian Government's opposition to apartheid.

In January 1992, the journal of the Royal Aeronautical Society (RAeS) reported that the SAA had allegedly confirmed that its passenger jets had carried cargo for Armscor, a South African arms manufacturer, in an attempt to circumvent a UN arms embargo placed on apartheid South Africa.

On 28 November 1987, South African Airways Flight 295, a Boeing 747-200 Combi en route from Taipei to Johannesburg with a stopover in Mauritius experienced a catastrophic in-flight fire in the cargo area, broke up in mid-air, and crashed into the Indian Ocean east of Mauritius, killing all 159 people on board. Ignition of an ammonium perchlorate cargo, a chemical used as a missile propellant, is theorised by forensic scientists to have caused the fire.

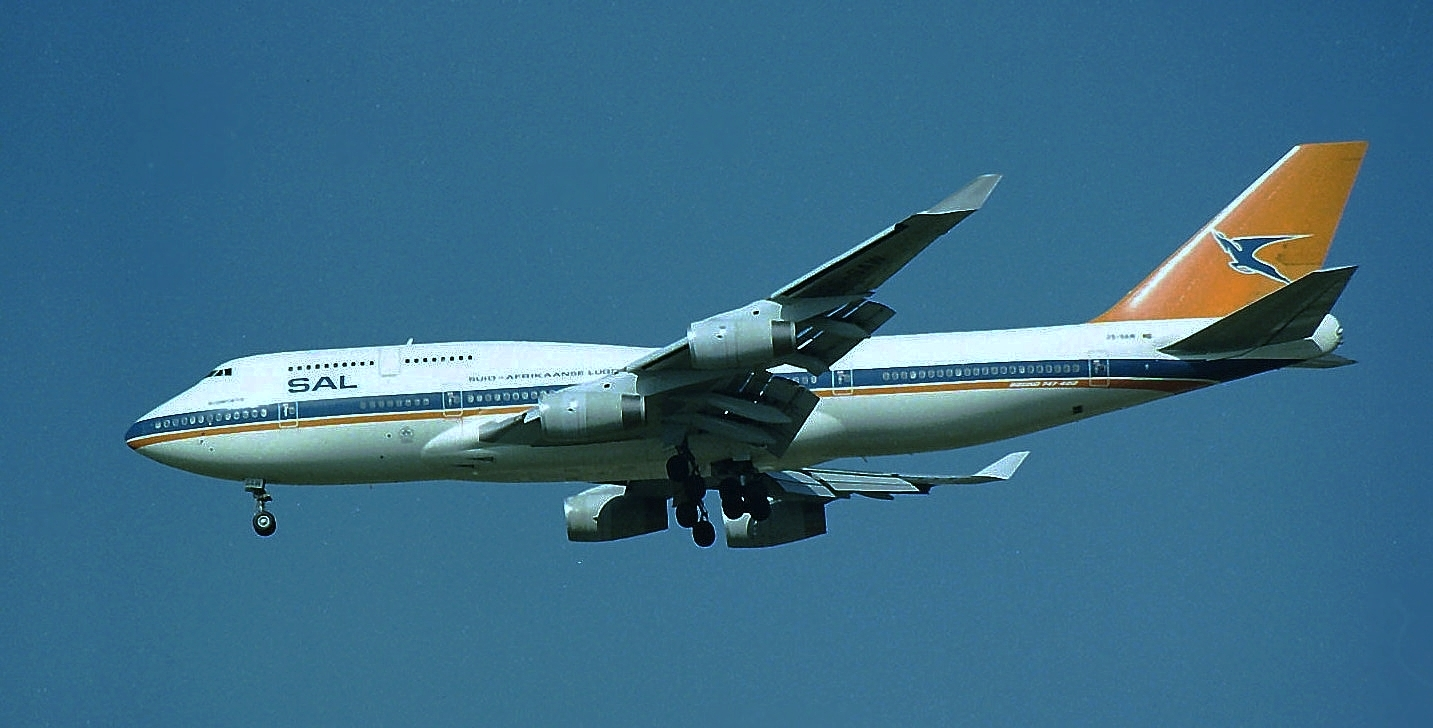
A Boeing 747-400 "ZS-SAW" painted in the pre–1997 orange, blue and white livery, and featuring the Afrikaans name of the airline SAL (Suid-Afrikaanse Lugdiens) (1998)

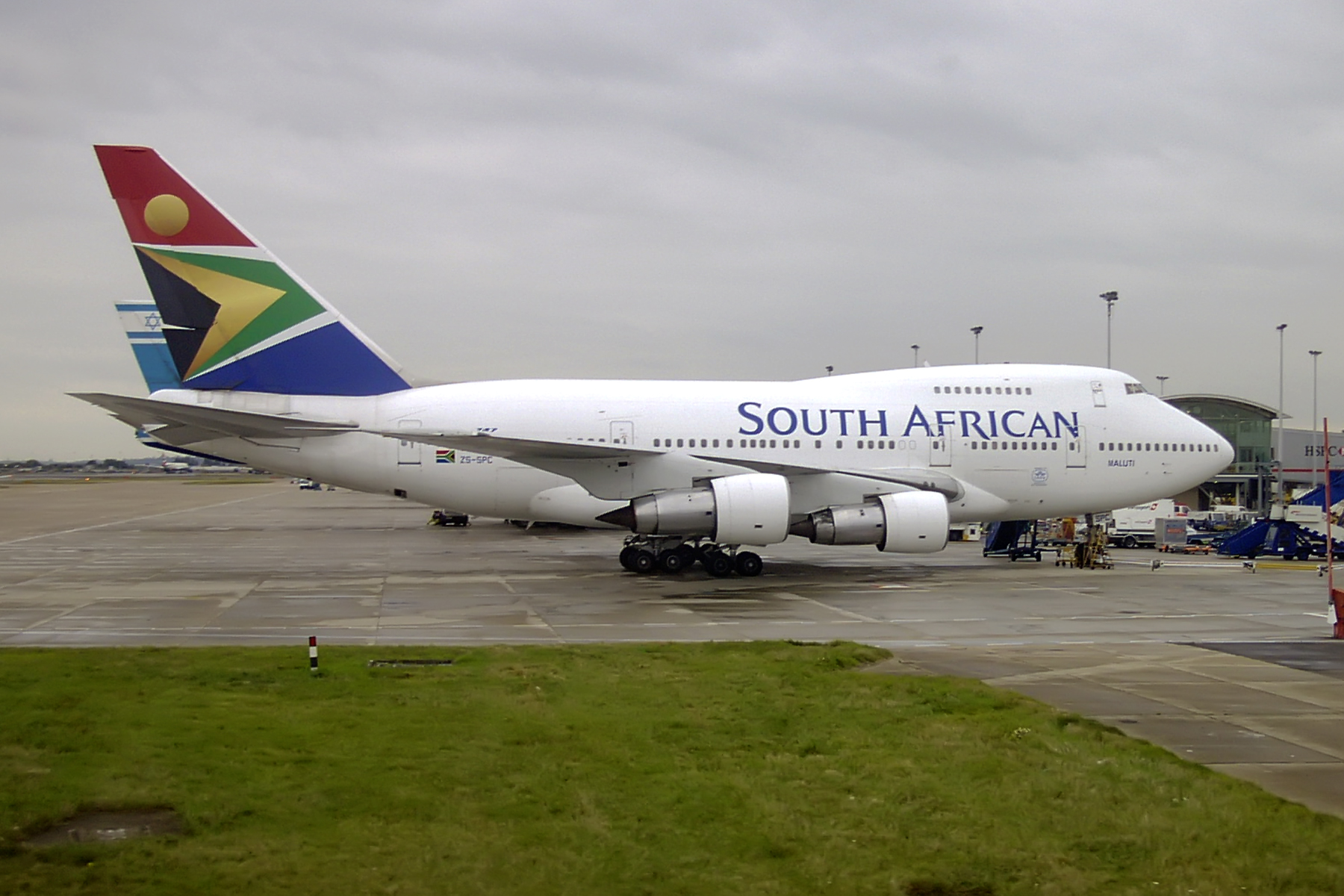
A Boeing 747SP (2001) (now on display at the South African Airways Museum at Rand Airport)

With the demise of apartheid in 1990, SAA started services to former and new destinations in Africa and Asia. On 1 June 1990, South African companies signed a domestic air travel deregulation act. Flights to New York City's John F. Kennedy International Airport resumed in November 1991 and SAA's planes were able to fly for the first time over Egypt and Sudan, on 8 September. The airline launched flights to Milan on 1 June during the year, and services to Athens were re-introduced. Also, an interline with Aeroflot was established.

The first of SAA's eight Boeing 747-400s, named Durban, arrived in South Africa on 19 January 1991. The airplane was unusual in that two different turbofan engines were operated. Six Rolls-Royce RB211-524H-powered examples were ordered; the other two, part of an unfulfilled Philippine Airlines order, had General Electric CF6-80C2B5Fs.

Winglets, structural changes and fuel-efficient engines enabled these aircraft to fly non-stop from South Africa to the east coast of the United States. The arrival of Boeing's newest jumbo jet perhaps overshadowed the acquisition by SAA of the world's first commercial fly-by-wire airliner, the Airbus A320, to assist and enhance services within the country and on regional services. Boeing 767s arrived in August 1993, and flew on African, Southern European and Middle Eastern routes. They were retired within ten years.

During 1992, SAA began flights to Miami with a Cape Town to Miami International Airport nonstop Boeing 747-400 route, and re-entered Australia, flying nonstop to Perth with a same-day return "shuttle" service to Sydney. This year also saw codesharing agreements with American Airlines and Air Tanzania.

There were nonstop flights to Bangkok and Singapore; the latter were discontinued by 1996. The airline Alliance, a partnership between SAA, Uganda Airlines and Air Tanzania, also began. SAA greeted its passengers in four different languages during domestic flights: English, Afrikaans, Zulu, and Sotho, while passengers on international flights were also greeted in the destination's language.

On 24 April 1994, South African Express (SA Express), a feeder airline service of South African, began operating after a 3-year preparation process begun in 1991, when the regional airline was granted its operating license. SAA initially held a 20% stake in SA Express (Alliance Airline Holdings held 51%, SA Enterprises, 24.9% and Abyss Investments, 4.1%). SA Express took over some of SAA's low-density domestic routes.

In 1995, Lufthansa started a codesharing agreement with SAA, and SAA commissioned Diefenbach Elkins and Herdbuoys to lead its change of image. SAA's Voyager and American Airlines' AAdvantage frequent flier clubs joined.

As of April 1996, South African employed 11,100 people, of whom 3,100 were engineers. It owned and operated 48 aircraft, and served 34 destinations from its hubs at Cape Town, Durban and Johannesburg.

=== Rebranding: 1997–2005 ===
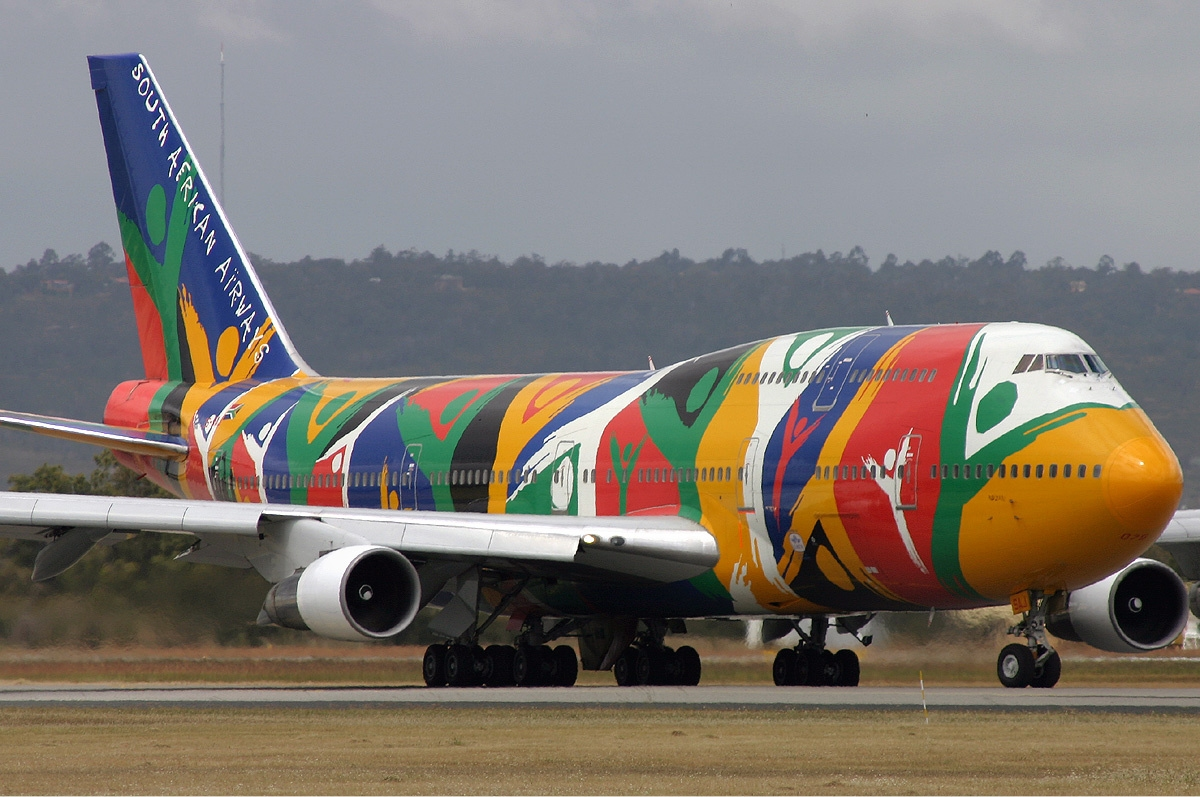
Boeing 747-300 Ndizani at Perth Airport (2003)

In 1997, SAA replaced the springbok emblem and the old national colours of orange, white and blue with a new livery based upon the new national flag, with a sun motif. The airline's name on its aircraft retained the Afrikaans name Suid-Afrikaanse Lugdiens. As a symbol of the new rainbow nation following the release of Nelson Mandela, one of SAA's 747-300s, named Ndizani (registration ZS-SAJ), was painted in bright colours. This special-liveried 747-300 transported South African athletes to the 1996 Summer Olympics in Atlanta. The airline started online ticket sales and formed an alliance with SA Airlink and SA Express.

In 1998, services to Copenhagen Airport were stopped. A new airline president and CEO, Coleman Andrews, was appointed. The arrival of the American saw a comprehensive and controversial overhaul of the airline, changing the management of SAA.

Mr Andrews was hired by Transnet, the state-owned parent company, to remedy the problem of dwindling passengers, which Transnet's market research had revealed was caused by "failure to fly on time, unfriendly and minimally-trained staff, poor food and SAA fares being 12–25% above its competitors". He was credited with rescuing World Airways from the brink of bankruptcy earlier in the decade. During his first 18 months as CEO, South African Airways' market value increased fivefold.

In June 1999, Transnet entered into a sale agreement with Swissair in which Transnet sold 20% of its shareholding in SAA to Swissair for R1.4 billion and also included an option to sell and transfer a further 10% to Swissair, thereby increasing its stake to 30%. In 2002, the South African government repurchased the shares.

Swissair's costly purchases of SAA's and many other large international airlines' shares led directly to its own shocking bankruptcy filing, on 1 April 2002.

In 2000, SAA ordered 21 Boeing 737-800s, reportedly worth US$680 million. Five CFM 56-7B27-powered examples were requested outright from Boeing, the rest from other parties. The 737s were to be deployed on short-haul routes, replacing Airbus A300s and A320s.

The 737 order was followed by an Airbus order in 2002. Under CEO Andre Viljoen, South African Airways requested Airbus to overhaul its fleet at a cost of US$3.5 billion in March 2002, taking advantage of a slump in the order books of both Boeing and Airbus. The airline industry was still staggering after the September 11 attacks in the US, which led to new aircraft orders either being deferred, or cancelled altogether.

SAA was in a buyers' market and the demise of Swissair, which had A340-600s about to be delivered, effected Airbus clinching the SAA deal. This was part of a bigger order that covered 11 A319s, 15 A320s, nine A340-600s and six A340-300s. Three of the A340-600 aircraft came from International Lease Finance Corporation (ILFC). The new Airbus A319s replaced the aging Boeing 737-200 fleet, but the Boeing 737-800s continued in service because SAA cancelled its A320 order before any aircraft were delivered.

Later that year, South African Airways made a successful bid for a 49% stake in Air Tanzania. The move highlighted SAA's wish to gain a foothold in eastern Africa. The bid was worth $20 million, and was SAA's first acquisition of a foreign airline. The merger failed in 2006, when new SAA management felt that the arrangement was fruitless.

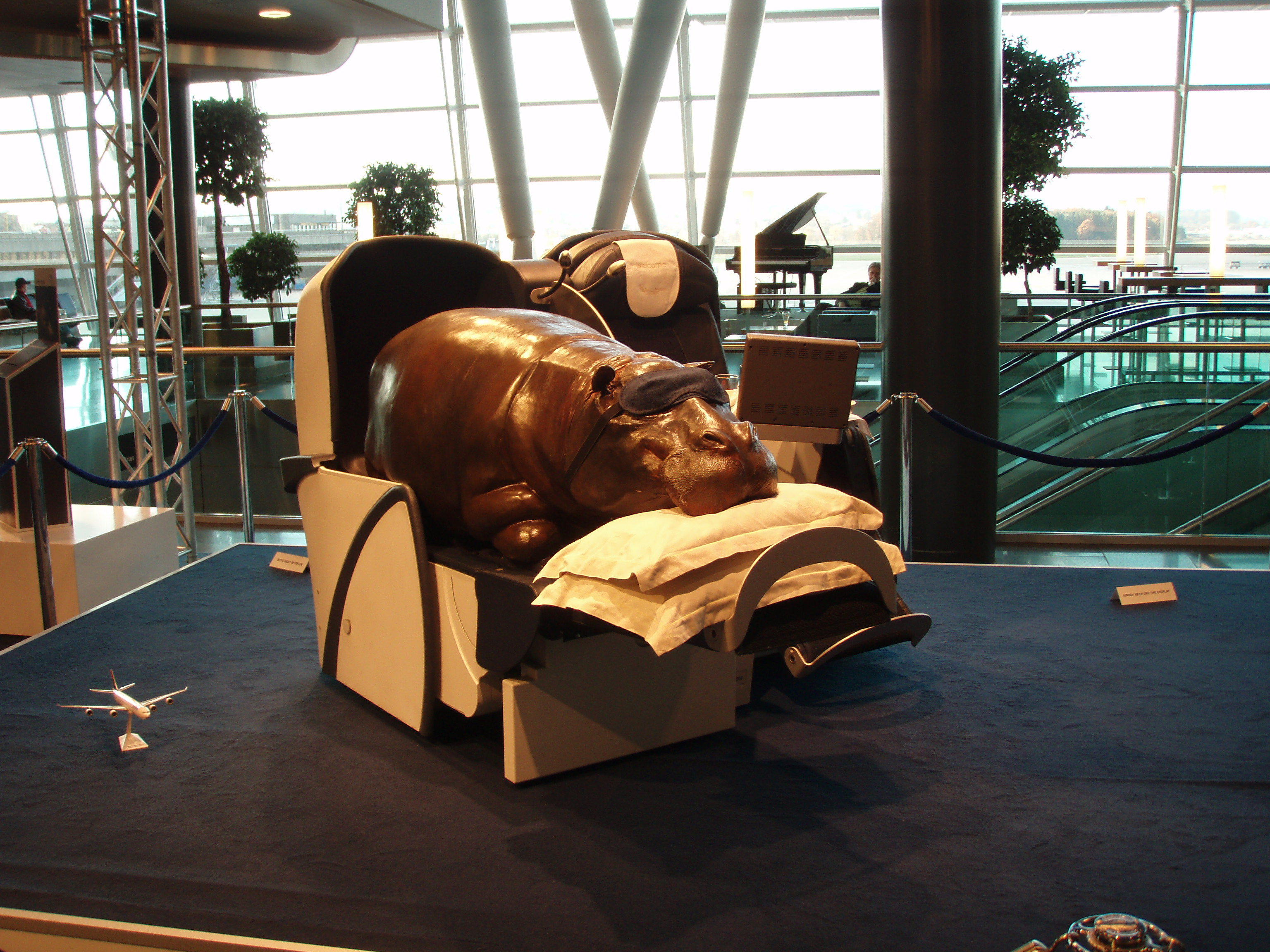
"New" Business Class seat on display in 2006

On 1 February 2000, South African Airways and Delta Air Lines started to codeshare on SAA-operated nonstop Boeing 747-400 flights from Atlanta to Johannesburg, with return flights operated via Fort Lauderdale-Hollywood International Airport, Florida due to range limitations caused by the 5,557-foot altitude at Johannesburg OR Tambo International Airport.

In 2001, South African Airways won the Best Cargo Airline to Africa award from Air Cargo News – (even though South African is mainly a passenger airline) – and South African Airways signed a codesharing agreement with Nigeria Airways to provide service from the United States to Lagos using South African Airways 747s (this codeshare agreement is no longer in effect, and SAA's flights to/from the United States no longer stop in Nigeria). The airline earned a spot on the Zagat Survey's top-ten international airlines list, opened a new website and named Andre Viljoen as chief executive officer (CEO).

In March 2004, South African Airways announced its application to join Star Alliance. The airline alliance accepted its application in June, with SAA joining as a full member in April 2006.

In July 2004, Andre Viljoen resigned as CEO of SAA. In August 2004, Khaya Ngqula was appointed as CEO of SAA. A new chairman, Professor Jakes Gerwel, was appointed in the same month.

In 2005, SAA became the first non-Saudi airline to fly a direct Hadj service to Medina in Saudi Arabia.

In July 2005, SAA started a four times weekly Johannesburg-Accra-Washington, D.C. service with a Boeing 747-400. Service was increased to daily flights in July 2006, and the 747-400 was replaced by an Airbus A340-600. Because SAA could not obtain rights to fly passengers between Ghana and the US, Dakar replaced Accra as the intermediate stop. In 2010, SAA retired the last of its 747-400 fleet.

On 6 June 2006, the codeshare agreement between South African Airways and Delta Air Lines was terminated because of the airlines' memberships in rival alliances (Star Alliance and SkyTeam respectively).

=== Restructuring and Star Alliance: 2006–2011 ===
South African Airways logo used until 2019

The South African government's plans called for the separation of South African Airways and its parent company Transnet. The deadline was moved from 2005 to 31 March 2006.

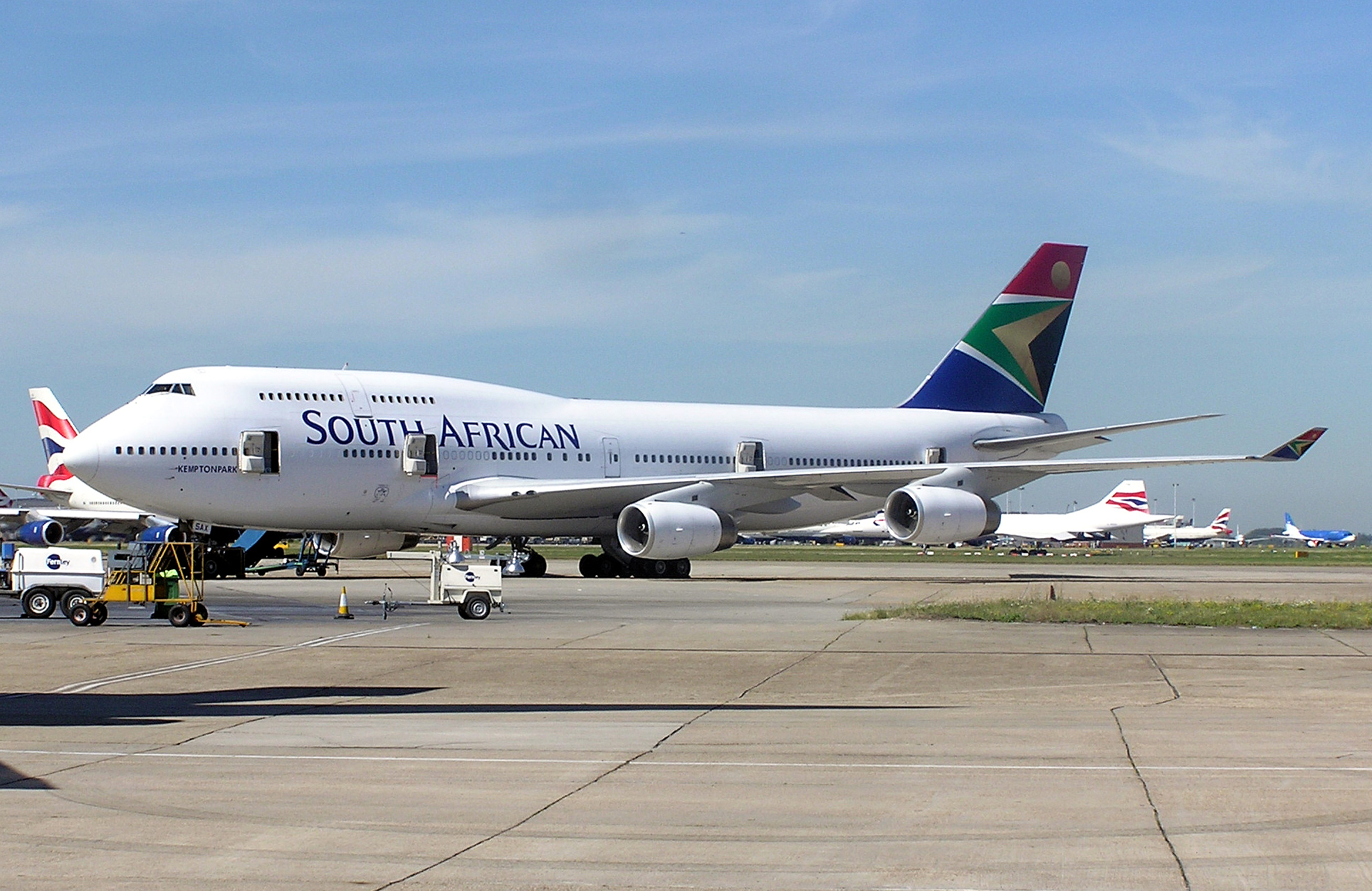
A Boeing 747-400 (ZS-SAX) at London Heathrow Airport in the old colour scheme. This type of aircraft was permanently retired in 2010.

SAA joined Star Alliance on 10 April 2006, becoming the first African airline to join Star Alliance. To celebrate the occasion, and as a condition of entry, one Airbus A340-600 (registration ZS-SNC) and one Boeing 737-800 (registration ZS-SJV) were repainted in Star Alliance livery. South African Airways fulfilled 53 requirements during the accession process.

In May 2007, SAA launched an 18-month comprehensive restructuring programme which aimed to make the airline profitable. According to then-CEO Khaya Ngqula, this came largely after "uncompetitive ownership and aircraft lease costs, excessive head count and fuel price volatility". The programme involved: the spin-off of businesses into seven subsidiaries, thereby allowing SAA to concentrate on its core business of passenger and cargo transport; grounding SAA's Boeing 747-400 fleet; rationalising international routes (Paris was dropped altogether); the axing of 30% of the airline's managers; among other reductions.

This was expected to save the airline R2.7 billion (US$378.2 million). By June 2009, R2.5 billion had been saved.

Two retired 747-400s were reactivated in 2008 for flights to Lagos, and by 2010 Luanda as well.

On 20 June 2008, the Association of Tennis Professionals (ATP) agreed to extend South African Airways' sponsorship of the organisation another 3 and a half years. This extension succeeded two years of co-operation that "have seen a successful partnership blossom between SAA and the ATP".

The deal was worth $20 million, and ran until the end of 2012. On the same day it was announced that a new ATP World Tour tournament would be held in South Africa in 2009. In 2010, the company sought to recover $4 million from then-CEO Khaya Ngqula, for allegedly spending the money on his friends and awarding business deals with organisations and individuals in which he had an interest. Among them are ATP and professional golfer Ángel Cabrera.

In February 2010, the airline appointed Siza Mzimela as its first female CEO. She replaced Khaya Ngqula, who was accused of mismanagement and therefore quit. Mzimela was previously CEO of SAA's domestic partner airline, South African Express (SA Express). On 1 April 2010 she took over the position from Chris Smyth, the acting CEO since Khaya Ngqula left in March 2009.

At the end of 2010, SAA permanently retired the two Boeing 747-400s which were temporarily re-introduced in late 2008. This was expected to save it $60 million during the fiscal year ending March 2009. SAA leased two second hand Airbus A340-300s from Airbus Financial Services (AFS) to replace the 747s.

=== Financial difficulties and bankruptcy: 2012–2020 ===
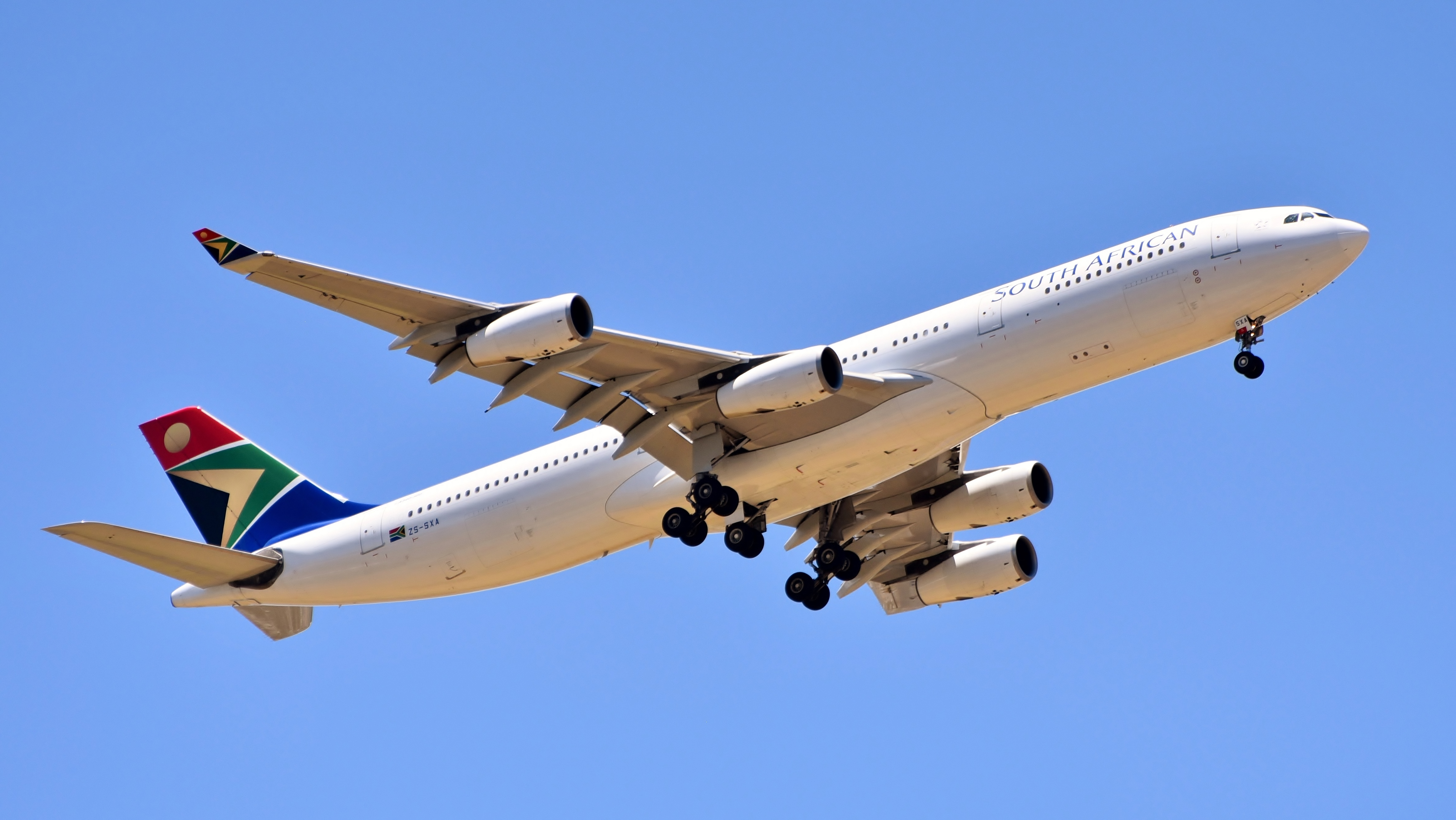
Airbus A340-300 (2019)

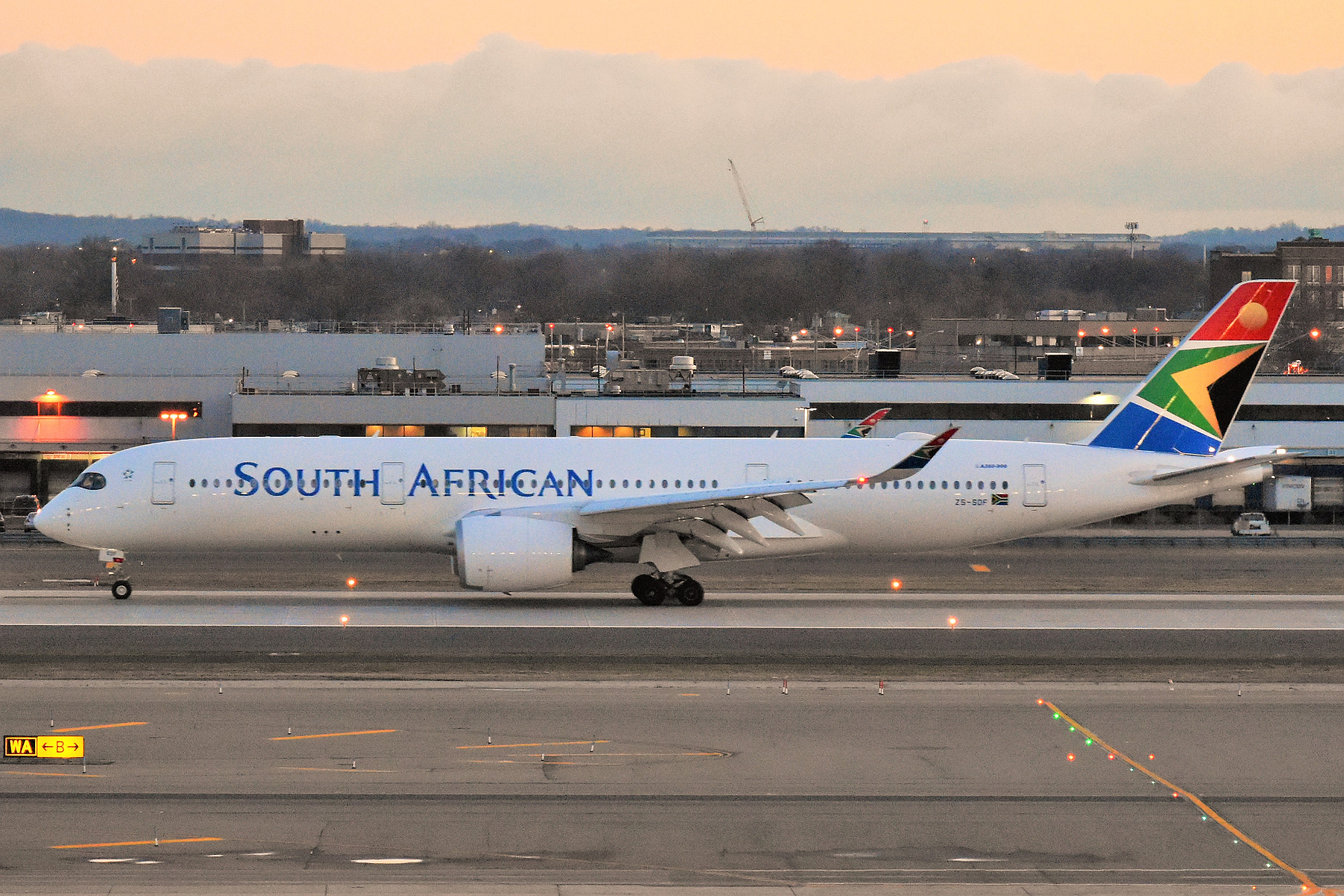
A since phased-out Airbus A350-900 in the current colour scheme arriving in New York (2020)

On 24 February 2012 SAA's new Airbus A320-200, registration ZS-SZZ, made its first revenue flight between Johannesburg and Durban. There were twelve A320s in the fleet as of December 2016. On 16 August 2012, SAA ended its Cape Town-London route after 20 years, due to declining passenger numbers and increasing airport taxes.

SAA began flights to Beijing, China on 31 January 2012. Buenos Aires flights ended in 2013 and, in January 2015, SAA announced plans to end its non-stop services to Beijing and Mumbai. Services to China were replaced by Star Alliance partner Air China with a flight to Beijing. In June 2015, the acting CEO stated that London, New York City, Hong Kong, Munich, Frankfurt and Perth were the only profitable long-haul routes; all others were loss-making.

In September 2017, SAA began reducing its fleet and expected to cut 23% of its flights. Standard Chartered Bank was the first bank in June 2017 to call in its SAA loan. The South African government provided R2.2 billion to settle the debt.

Citibank was the second bank to refuse extending the loan facility. Together with some others, another R7.7 billion became payable at the end of September 2017. The South African treasury asked the Public Investment Corporation, which controls government pension funds, for R100 billion to help bail out state-owned enterprises, including SAA.

On 5 December 2019, the government of South Africa announced that SAA would enter into bankruptcy protection, as the airline had not turned a profit since 2011 and had run out of money. In January 2020, South African Airways announced that it would suspend several routes, e.g. to Munich in order to reduce its financial struggle. In February 2020, the airline introduced its first of four newly leased Airbus A350-900s in an attempt to modernise its loss-making long-haul fleet.

On 5 December 2019, SAA was placed under business rescue. Les Matuson and Siviwe Dongwana were appointed as the Business Rescue Practitioners of SAA in December 2019. A business recovery plan was expected by the end of February 2020, extended, then postponed. A final plan is yet to be presented.

In February 2020, ex-Secretary General of the ANC, Ace Magashule, stated that should the Business Rescue Practitioners take decisions not to the ANC's liking, it would intervene. Economist Jacques Jonker, then at the Free Market Foundation, criticised Magashule, pointing out that the Business Rescue Practitioners are officers of the court in terms of the Companies Act of 2008, and that it would be illegal for the ANC to intervene in the business rescue process.

When Minister of Public Enterprises Pravin Gordhan later tried to justify the notion that the business rescue practitioners are accountable to him and not to the courts, Jonker pointed out that such a state of affairs would be unconstitutional.

In April 2020, following a request for further emergency financing due to the COVID-19 pandemic, the South African government announced that it would stop funding the airline with immediate effect. The airline then announced plans to lay off all remaining staff by the end of the month, sparking fears that SAA was on the brink of liquidation.

As of 1 May 2020, all SAA staff members were on unpaid leave of absence, including those who are reporting for duty, with no pay for the 4,708 remaining workforce. Unaudited financial statements presented in a draft report show SAA made losses of almost R16 billion in the previous three years. SAA received R50 billion of government assistance between 2004 and 2020.

On 2 May 2020, the government of South Africa announced that South African Airways would be ceasing operations after 86 years of service, and that a new flagship carrier would be created for South Africa out of the ashes of the former airline. The liquidation process was set to begin on 8 May; however, a legal battle between the liquidators and the workforce delayed the proceedings indefinitely. In July, the creditors voted to accept the restructuring plan, allowing the airline to avoid liquidation. A full domestic network was to be reinstated by December 2020.

On 21 August 2020, The Department of Public Enterprises (DPE) appointed Rand Merchant Bank to help with negotiations with private entities interested in buying into the country's insolvent national carrier, which needed at least R10 billion to resume operations. On 30 September the airline announced that it was suspending all operations until critical funding could be agreed.

In September 2020, SAA suspended all flight operations as the Business Rescue Practitioners placed the airline under "care and maintenance" until further funding could be sourced.

In October 2020, the South African government said it was looking for partners in its efforts to bail out the airline. On 28 October 2020, the South African government bailed SAA out with R10.5 billion in order to implement the turnaround strategy. During 2020, the airline returned 4 Airbus A319s, all of its 10 A320s, all of its 6 A330-200s, 4 A330-300s, 3 A340-300s, 3 A340-600s, and all 4 new A350-900s to their respective lessors. Both Boeing 737 Freighters also left the fleet in early 2020, ending a long history of dedicated freighter operations at the airline.

As of February 2021, the South African government was in talks with three potential investors to revive the airline and resume operations, with a massively-reduced workforce. The South African treasury reported that the airline had incurred a total loss of R32 billion (US$2.1 billion) between 2008 and 2020. The Mail and Guardian estimated that the airline had received a total of R60 billion (US$4 billion) in government guarantees.

=== Relaunch and return to profitability: 2021–present ===
In June 2021, the South African government relinquished its controlling stake in the airline. After extensive talks with potential investors, they selected the Takatso Consortium. The consortium was to own 51% of the airline, while the government maintains a 49% stake. The consortium involves Harith General Partners and Global Airways. Harith General Partners is chaired by South Africa's former deputy finance minister, Jabulani Moleketi. In the address in which he announced the takeover, Pravin Gordhan, the Minister of Public Enterprises, revealed that SAA would receive a R3 billion boost in investment from the new partners.

In July 2021, Professor John Lamola was appointed to serve as Chairman of SAA's Interim Board. Lamola had previously served as CEO of Denel Aeronautics (then Denel Avaiation) from 1996 to 2001, and served on the Board of Airports Company South Africa (ACSA) from 2012 to 2017.

In an interview on 26 November 2021, Gordhan reiterated that the South African government still expects to complete the transaction with the Takatso Consortium in early 2022, despite the ongoing COVID-19 pandemic.

In May 2022, then-Chairman John Lamola was appointed as SAA's new CEO. Subsequently, Sedzani Faith Mudau assumed the role of Chairwoman.

In October 2022, SAA expanded its fleet with the addition of 2 Airbus A320-200 and added new routes from Johannesburg to Victoria Falls, Zimbabwe, Malawi and Windhoek, Namibia.

On 31 October 2023, SAA resumed services to São Paulo in Brazil, the first intercontinental route to be flown by the airline since the start of the pandemic. SAA also resumed flights to Perth, Australia in April 2024. Since relaunching, South African Airways has increased the frequency of their Perth bound flights to 4 weekly flights, increasing to 5 by late January 2025.

In April 2026, Lamola resigned as CEO of South African Airways. His resignation was announced on 10 April 2026 with Matshela Seshibe set to serve as acting CEO. Lamola's resignation coincided with the departure of several board members and followed the earlier exit of the airline's chief financial officer.

In October 2026, the South African Treasury stated that SAA had until February 2027 to find a buyer. The Treasury said that the state would not provide further funding beyond the airline's existing R1 billion loan guarantee, which it confirmed SAA had not yet drawn down on. The deadline to find a buyer is one of the conditions of that loan. It was also reported that SAA was engaging with multiple potential lenders.

== Destinations ==
South African Airways flies to 17 destinations in 12 countries within Africa, Australia and South America as of January 2024. Within South Africa, SAA operates to only three cities however, the airline previously had an extensive domestic and regional network through its affiliate partners such as its LCC Mango Airlines, Airlink, and South African Express.

=== Codeshare agreements ===
South African Airways codeshares with the following airlines:

- Africa World Airlines
- Air Canada
- Air China
- Air Mauritius
- Air New Zealand
- Air Seychelles
- All Nippon Airways
- Asiana Airlines
- Brussels Airlines
- CemAir
- Egyptair
- Ethiopian Airlines
- Gol Airlines
- JetBlue
- Kenya Airways
- LAM Mozambique Airlines
- Lufthansa
- RwandAir
- Scandinavian Airlines
- Singapore Airlines
- Swiss International Air Lines
- TAAG Angola Airlines
- TAP Air Portugal
- Turkish Airlines
- United Airlines
- Virgin Australia

=== Interline agreement ===
South African Airways interlines with the following airlines:

- Air Burkina
- APG Airlines
- Hahn Air
- Hawaiian Airlines

== Fleet ==
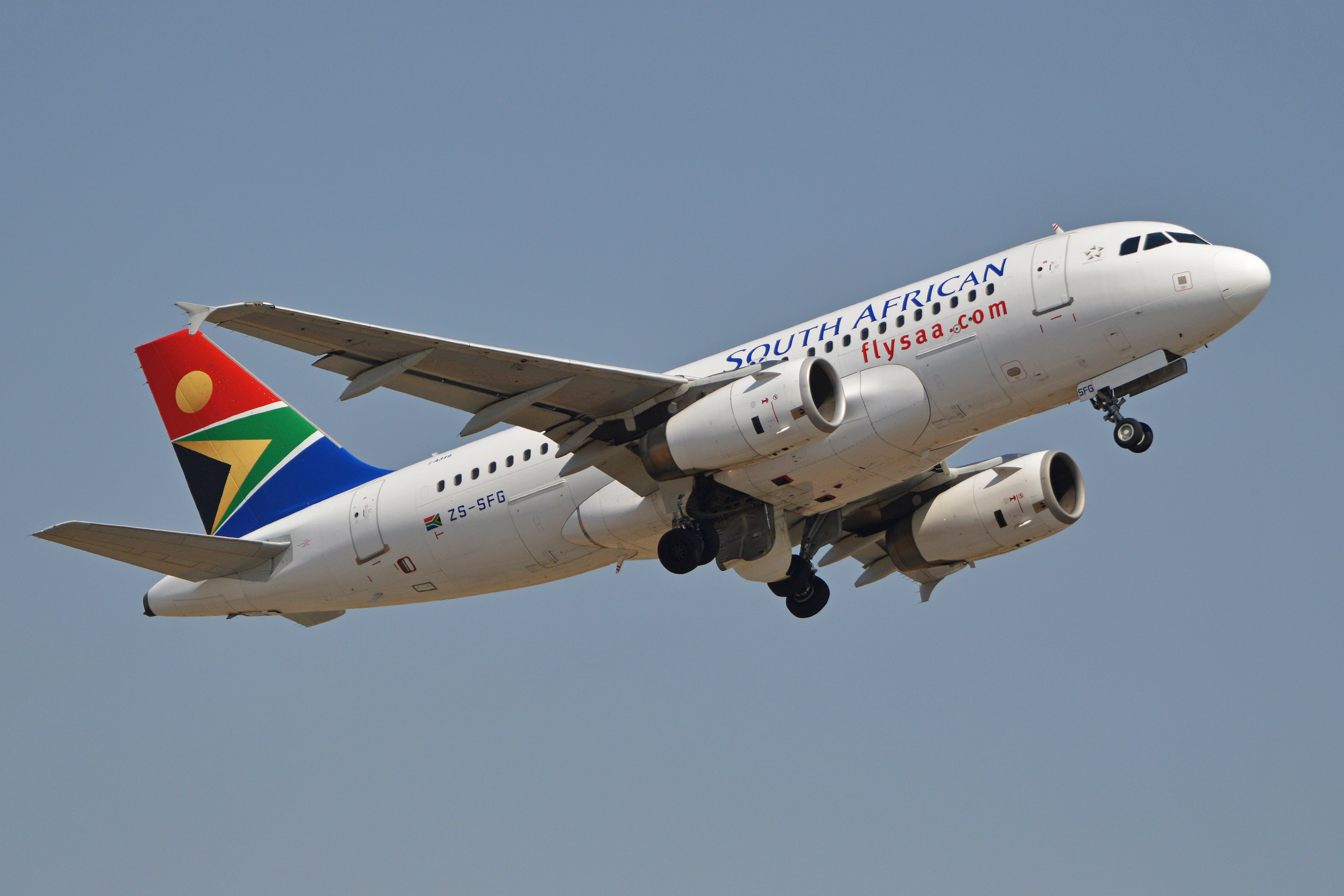
Former South African Airbus A319-100

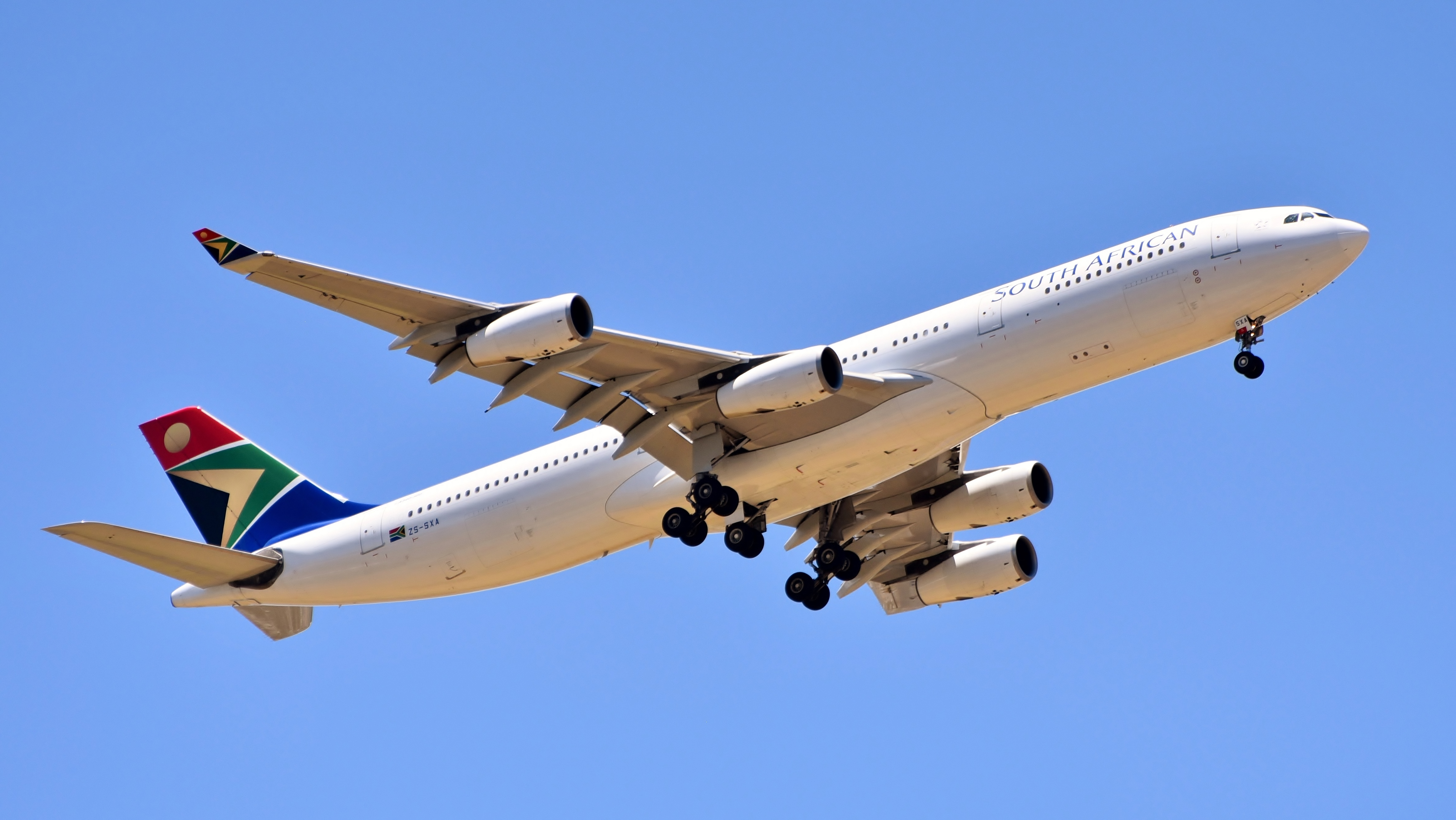
South African Airbus A340-300

=== Current fleet ===
As of April 2026, South African Airways operates an all-Airbus fleet composed of the following aircraft:

Aircraft	In service	Orders	Passengers			Notes
Aircraft	In service	Orders	C	Y	Total	Notes
Airbus A320-200	15	—	24	114	138	
Airbus A320-200	15	—	8	150	158	
Airbus A320-200	15	—	—	186	186	
Airbus A330-300	2	2	46	203	249	
Airbus A340-300	2	—	38	215	253	
Total	19	2				

=== Former fleet ===
South African Airways has previously operated the following aircraft:

South African Airways historical fleet
Aircraft	Total	Introduced	Retired	Notes
Airbus A300B2	4	1976	2001	
Airbus A300B4	4	1981	2001	
Airbus A300C4	1	1982	2000	
Airbus A319-100	10	2004	2023	
Airbus A320-200	7	1991	2002	
Airbus A320-200	11	2013	2020	
Airbus A330-200	5	2002	2004	Leased from British Midland International and TAM Airlines.
Airbus A330-200	6	2011	2020	
Airbus A340-200	6	2003	2014	
Airbus A340-600	9	2002	2021	
Airbus A350-900	4	2019	2020	2 delivered to Air Mauritius; 2 delivered to Avolon
Airspeed AS.6 Envoy	4	1936	1938	
Avro 685 York	8	1945	1947	
Boeing 707-320	11	1960	1980	ZS-EUW crashed as Flight 228.
Boeing 727-100	6	1965	1982	
Boeing 727-100C	3	1967	1982	
Boeing 737-200	29	1968	2006	
Boeing 737-200F	2	1981	2013	
Boeing 737-300F	3	2007	2020	
Boeing 737-800	21	2000	2018	Sixteen aircraft were transferred to Mango Airlines.
Boeing 747-200B	5	1971	2004	ZS-SAN preserved at the South African Airways Museum Society at Rand Airport
Boeing 747-200M	2	1980	1994	ZS-SAS crashed as Flight 295.
Boeing 747-200F	2	1995	2000	ZS-SAR (re-registered as 9G-MKJ after being sold) was later written off while operating with MK Airlines in the crash of Flight 1602.
Boeing 747-300	6	1983	2004	
Boeing 747-400	8	1991	2010	
Boeing 747SP	6	1976	2003	ZS-SPC preserved at the South African Airways Museum Society at Rand Airport.
Boeing 767-200ER	3	1993	2004	
de Havilland DH.60 Gypsy Moth	1	1934	1937	
de Havilland DH.104 Dove	2	1947	1952	
de Havilland DH.106 Comet	2	1953	1954	Leased from BOAC. G-ALYY crashed as Flight 201 due to in-flight break up.
Douglas DC-3	8	1946	1970	
Douglas DC-4	7	1946	1967	
Douglas DC-7	4	1956	1967	
Hawker Siddeley HS 748	3	1970	1983	
Junkers F.13	4	1934	1940	
Junkers Ju 52/3m	15	1934	1940	
Junkers Ju 86	18	1937	1940	
Junkers W.34	1	1934	1937	
Lockheed Constellation	4	1950	1964	
Lockheed L-18 Lodestar	21	1944	1955	
Vickers VC.1 Viking	8	1947	1951	
Vickers Viscount	8	1958	1971	

== Services ==
=== In-flight services ===
Business class

South African Airways' Airbus A330-300 business-class seats have a pitch of 75" whilst those in the A340-300s are pitched at 73" respectively; in a 2-2-2 configuration in the A340-300 and a 1-2-1 in the A330-300’s. Passengers receive a welcome pack, a duvet & full-size pillow and a personal touchscreen monitor with audio/video on demand. South African Airways operates the Airbus A320-200 on its domestic and regional routes. South African Airways' A320 business-class seats have a 39" pitch in a 2-2 configuration.

Economy

SAA Airbus A330 and A340 economy-class seats have a pitch of 32" in a 2-4-2 configuration. Passengers receive a welcome pack, a blanket & full-size pillow and a personal touchscreen monitor with audio/video on demand. The Airbus A320 economy-class seats have a pitch of 31".

=== Frequent-flyer program ===
Voyager is the frequent-flyer program of South African Airways. Apart from South African Airlink and South African Express, which have an alliance with SAA, the program also partners 32 other airlines, along with many more businesses. Voyager consists of five tiers – Blue, Silver, Gold, Platinum and Lifetime Platinum. To reach a higher tier, members must fly on selected flights to allocate "Tier Miles". This differs from "Base Miles", which members can only use to receive awards.

=== Airport lounges ===
SAA hosts domestic and international lounges around the world accessible through SAA Business and First Class passengers, Discovery Bank Platinum and above and Investec Black Card customers.

== Corporate affairs ==
=== Head office ===
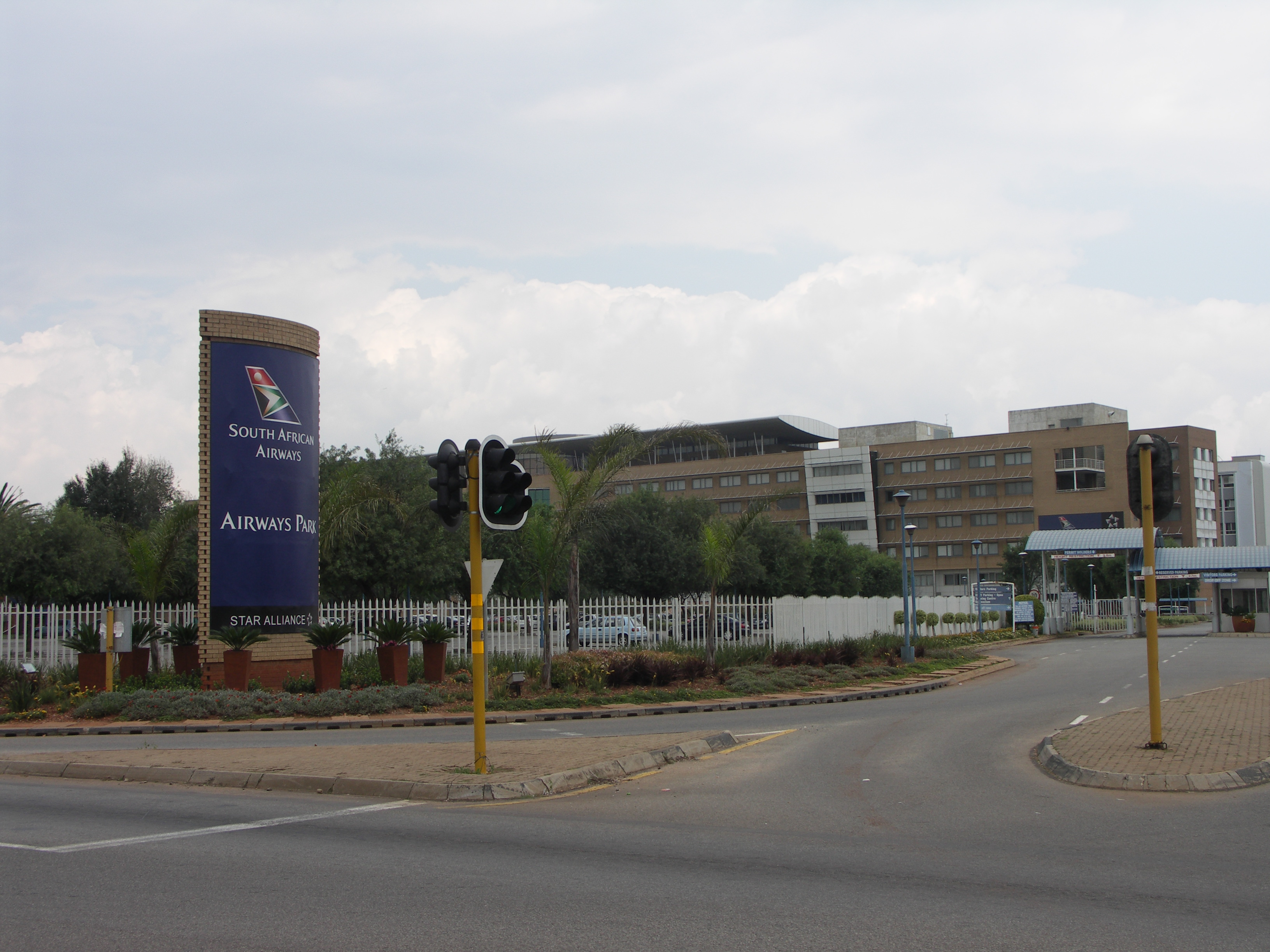
Airways Park, the head office of South African Airways

South African Airways is headquartered in Airways Park on the grounds of O. R. Tambo International Airport in Kempton Park, Ekurhuleni, Gauteng. The building was developed by Stauch Vorster Architects. Completed in March 1997 for R70 million, the 27,000-square-metre (290,000 sq ft) current head-office building links to three older buildings.

South African Airways moved its head office from Durban to Rand Airport in Germiston on 1 July 1935. Before the head office moved to its current location, the airline's head office was in the Airways Towers in Johannesburg.

=== Business trends ===
The business trends shown below are for the South African Airways group (including SAA, Mango, SAA Technical and Air Chefs), based mainly on the published annual reports; there are gaps and some inconsistencies, largely because the reports vary year by year in the information given and because figures are frequently restated in subsequent years.

SAA was placed in business rescue on 5 December 2019. Inconsistent figures have been made public since then. SAA emerged from business rescue 17 months later on 30 April 2021, and restarted operations in late September 2021, at much reduced levels of activity.

The available trends are (for years ending 31 March):

	2014	2015	2016	2017	2018	2019	2020	2021	2022	2023	2024	2025
Turnover (R billion)	30.3	30.1	30.4	30.7	29.4	27.0			2.0	5.6	7.0	9.3
Operating profit (R million)	−2,307	−5,163	−538	−3,639	−4,051	−5,150			−3,600	389	−136	−317
Retained earnings (R million)	−2,590	−5,619	−1,492	−5,301	−5,478	−6,482					−430	162
Number of employees	11,491	11,476	10,706	10,071								3,422
Revenue passenger mile (R million)	25,606	24,523	24,234	23,740				kms:			1,900	3,400
SAA	23,124	21,814	21,079	20,678							1,900	3,400
Mango	2,482	2,709	3,155	3,062					Mango ceased flying in July 2021			
Number of passengers (million)	9.3	9.2	9.9	9.7							1.3	1.9
SAA	7.1	6.7	6.9	6.8							1.3	1.9
Mango	2.2	2.5	3.0	2.9					Mango ceased flying in July 2021			
Passenger load factor (%)	75	73	75	75							48	65
Cargo carried (000s tonnes)	132	131	114	111								16,145
Number of aircraft	45	55	53	64							13	17
Notes and sources												

=== Emblems ===
South African Airways' "Flying Springbok" logo was the symbol of the carrier from its formation in 1934 to 1997. The logo was discontinued in 1997 in favour of a new aircraft livery, but the word "Springbok" remains the airline's radio callsign.

1934-1948

1948-1971

1971-1997

=== Chief executive officers (CEO) through the years ===
Term started	Term ended	Name	Notes
1975	1977	Salomon Pienaar	
1977	1982	Eddie Smuts	
1982	1983	Frans Swarts	
1983	1993	Gerrit van der Veer	
1993	1998	Michael Myburgh	
1998	2001	Coleman Andrews	
2001	2004	Andre Viljoen	
2004	2009	Khaya Ngqula	
2009	2010	Chris Smythe	(acting)
2010	2012	Siza Mzimela	
2012	2013	Vuyisile Kona	(Chairman / acting CEO)
2013	2013	Nico Bezuidenhout	(acting)
2013	2014	Monwabisi Kalawe	
2014	2015	Nico Bezuidenhout	(acting)
2015	2015	Thuli Mpeshe	(acting)
2015	2017	Musi Zwane	(acting)
2017	2019	Vuyani Jarana	
2019	2020	Zukisa Ramasia	(acting)
2020	2020	Philip Saunders	(interim)
2021	2022	Thomas Kgokolo	(interim)
2022	2026	John Lamola	
2026	2026	Matshela Seshibe	(acting)
2026	Incumbent	Koekie Mbeki	(acting)

== Controversy ==
=== Anti-competitive practices ===
On 5 June 2007, it was announced that SAA paid R55 million to the Competition Commission of South Africa because of anti-competitive behaviour such as price fixing. This fine was in addition to a R45 million fine paid by SAA on 31 May 2006 as a penalty for SAA's attempts to prevent travel agents from dealing with rival air carriers.

"Kulula has once again called on government to call it a day and keep its promise...that South African taxpayers will stop filling the begging bowl for ailing state-owned businesses". Many other companies like Flitestar, SunAir and Nationwide had failed because they could not compete with state-funded SAA. "State re-nationalisation of the industry will continue to be destructive to free and fair competition". The company said it was "bizarre" that the proceeds of its income tax, fuel taxes, VAT, import duties and other government levies then were paid over to a state-owned competitor.

=== Racism controversy ===
SAA has been accused of racism for rejecting white cadet pilots on the grounds of race, who met the educational and physical criteria. By filling out several dummy applications, journalists from the newspaper Beeld established that the online form had been programmed to reject any white applicants. The South African trade union Solidarity instituted legal action against SAA, resulting in the policy being revoked.

"SAA's normal recruitment process allows for the employment of white male pilots as and when vacancies exist; particularly when no candidate is available from a previously-disadvantaged background. Like all other South African companies, the airline is also required to meet statutory transformation targets. This means that, in recruiting, the airline has to ensure that the demographics of its employees match closely those of the country as a whole. This is in line with the employment equity definition which includes white females."

=== Corruption controversy ===
During the administration of Jacob Zuma the SAA board was implicated in a number of corruption-related controversies. Most notable were allegations of corrupt or irregular activities by then SAA Non-Executive Director and Zuma appointee Dudu Myeni, which were widely blamed for placing SAA in serious financial difficulty.

=== 2019 Industrial strike action ===
South African Airways was hit by strike action by unions starting 15 November 2019 with an agreement in principle being reached on 22 November 2019. The strike action reportedly cost the airline R50 million per day.

=== Delinquent director judgement - Dudu Myeni ===
In March 2017, Organisation Undoing Tax Abuse and the South African Airways Pilots' Association (SAAPA) brought an application in the Pretoria High Court for an order to declare Dudu Myeni a delinquent director in terms of section 162(5) of the South African Companies Act 71 of 2008. The application was based on Myeni's conduct whilst chair of the SAA board. During those five years (2012–2013 to 2016–2017), SAA ran up losses of R16.844bn‚ although it had previously been profitable.

Organisation Undoing Tax Abuse and the South African Airways Pilots' Association (SAAPA) called six witnesses against Myeni, including four former SAA executives. Myeni was the only witness in her own defence. In closing argument, the counsel for the plaintiffs, Advocate Carol Steinberg, said during her time at SAA, Ms Myeni blocked, delayed and obstructed important initiatives to turn the airline around. She broke the law and flouted basic governance principles.

The evidence in court showed a pattern of repeated misconduct: dishonesty, obstruction and interference, improperly inserting middlemen, and governance failures. Accused of bringing the embattled SAA to its knees, and based on her actions during her five-year tenure as chairperson of the SAA board, Myeni was declared a delinquent director and banned from holding any directorship position for life by Judge Ronel Tolmay at the Pretoria High Court on 27 May 2020. The judgement and evidence now goes to the National Prosecuting Authority so a criminal case can be pursued.

== Accidents and incidents ==
- On 16 June 1937, a Junkers Ju 52/3m (registration ZS-AKY) was destroyed by fire after it crashed on take-off at Port Elizabeth Airport following engine failure in two engines. All on board escaped. This was the airline's first accident in which passengers were injured.
- On 16 October 1937, a Junkers W34 fi (registration ZS-AEC), named Sir George Grey, crashed during a mail flight. The aeroplane was damaged beyond repair.
- On 28 March 1941, a Lockheed Model 18 Lodestar (registration ZS-AST) crashed at Elands Bay, South Africa. All on board were killed on impact and in the post-crash fire.
- On 5 January 1948, a Lockheed Model 18 Lodestar (registration ZS-ASW) touched down at Palmietfontein too far along the runway for it to stop before running off the end. The undercarriage was ripped off and the hull damaged beyond repair. There were light injuries to passengers but no fatalities.
- On 15 October 1951, a Douglas DC-3 (registration ZS-AVJ), named Pardeberg, flying in instrument meteorological conditions en route on a domestic flight from Port Elizabeth to Durban, flew into Mount Ingeli near Kokstad, Western KwaZulu-Natal. Seventeen people were killed. The board of inquiry determined that the unserviceability of ground-based radio navigational aids along the route was a major contributing factor.
- On 15 September 1952, a Douglas DC-3 (registration ZS-AVI) was damaged beyond repair while attempting to land at an unlit country airport at Carolina, South Africa after the crew became lost on a flight to Johannesburg from Livingstone, Zambia. After attempting to hold for thunderstorms to clear near their destination, the crew initiated a landing when their fuel ran low. The elevation of the airfield was mis-judged and the aircraft hit a rocky outcrop on final approach to the runway. No passengers or crew were killed or injured.
- On 8 April 1954, a de Havilland Comet I (registration G-ALYY), Flight 201, departed Rome for Cairo and Johannesburg. The aircraft crashed off the coast of Italy following a in-flight breakup, killing all 21 people on board. The wreckage was never recovered, but all known evidence pointed to a repeat of the recent accident to BOAC Flight 781. The aircraft was leased on charter from BOAC with an SAA crew.
- On 29 October 1960, a Boeing 707-344A (registration ZS-CKC), operating as Flight 218, executed a wheels-up landing at Nairobi Airport after damaging the undercarriage during an impact with the ground on its initial approach. No passengers or crew were killed or injured but the aircraft remained out of operation for many months until it was repaired and re-introduced into service.
- On 6 March 1962, a Douglas DC-3 (registration ZS-DJC) operating as Flight 512 crashed into a mountainside in the vicinity of Seymour, Eastern Cape, South Africa, after the pilot insisted on conducting the flight under visual flight rules (VFR) while flying below low cloud above rising ground. The pilot and first officer were killed but the passengers and cabin staff survived.
- On 30 June 1962, a Douglas DC-4 (registration ZS-BMH) was involved in a mid-air collision with a military Harvard training aircraft near Durban airport. The military aircraft crashed but the crew managed to land the airliner without injury to passengers or crew despite losing a large part of the vertical stabiliser. The aircraft was the last DC-4 manufactured and was repaired and returned to service. It is currently owned by the South African Airways Museum Society and still flies.
- On 13 March 1967, a Vickers Viscount 818 (registration ZS-CVA), christened Rietbok, operating as Flight 406, crashed into the sea near Kayser's Beach during bad weather while on approach to East London, Eastern Cape. All twenty-five persons on board were killed. The accident investigation board stated 'The available data is not sufficient for the originating cause of the accident to be determined with any degree of probability'. However the board could not rule out the possibility that the pilot suffered a heart attack resulting in a loss of control.
- On 20 April 1968, a six-week-old Boeing 707-344C (registration ZS-EUW), named Pretoria, operating Flight SA228, was lost near Windhoek, South West Africa (now Namibia). The crew used a flap-retraction sequence from the 707-B series which removed flaps in larger increments than desirable for that stage of the flight, leading to a loss of lift at 600 feet (180 m) above ground level. The subsequent descent went undetected by the crew, leading to impact with the ground. 123 people died.
- On 24 May 1972, the only successful hijacking of an SAA flight took place; a Boeing 727-100 (registration ZS-SBE) was en route from Salisbury, Rhodesia (now known as Harare, Zimbabwe) to Johannesburg. Two Lebanese, Kamil and Yagi, took control of the aircraft by packing dynamite sticks on the hat-racks. They were armed with a pistol. They forced the pilot, Captain Blake Flemington, to return to Salisbury, where they landed and re-fuelled with 12 hostages remaining on board. The captain tricked them into thinking that they were en route to the Seychelles, while he was in fact heading for Blantyre, Malawi. After landing, the passengers used nightfall to enter the cockpit, where they climbed down the emergency escape rope. By the time the hijackers realised this, only the captain, one passenger, and a flight steward, Dirk Nel, remained on the aircraft. The two hijackers started fighting with each other for possession of the dynamite fuse. In the ensuing chaos, the three captives escaped, leaving the two hijackers on board. Members of the Malawi security forces started shooting and the two surrendered. They were jailed for two years on a charge of being in possession of an undeclared firearm on board an aircraft. After serving one year of their sentence, they were released.

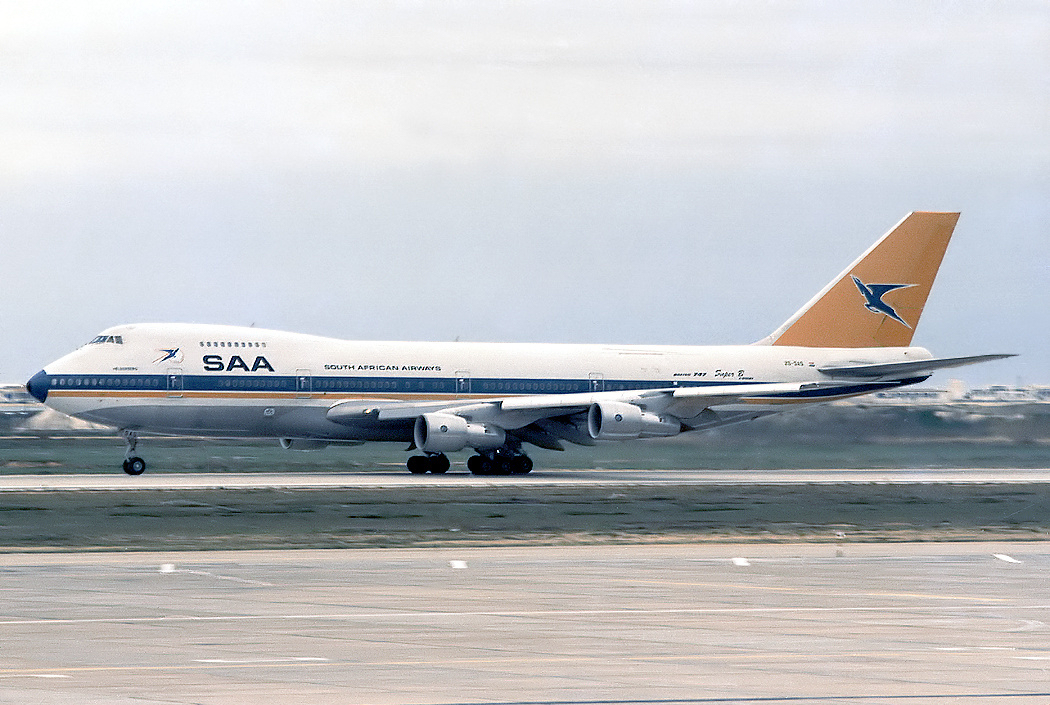
Boeing 747-244M ZS-SAS, photographed in 1986. ZS-SAS crashed in 1987 as South African Airways Flight 295.

- On 28 November 1987, a Boeing 747-200M Combi(registration ZS-SAS and named Helderberg), operating as Flight 295, crashed in the Indian Ocean en route from Taipei, Taiwan to Johannesburg via Mauritius, after a fire in the main cargo hold. The cause of the fire is undetermined, and a number of conspiracy theories (mostly pertaining to the nuclear armaments being produced by the South African government at the time) are in circulation surrounding the crash. Ignition of an ammonium perchlorate cargo, a chemical used as a missile propellant, is theorised by forensic scientists to have caused the fire. At the time, passenger jets of SAA were suspected to have illegally carried weapons cargo for Armscor, in an attempt to circumvent UN sanctions placed on apartheid-era South Africa. All 159 people on board were killed.
- On 17 June 2006, on South African Airways Flight 322, a Boeing 737-800 en route from Cape Town to Johannesburg, a 21-year-old Zimbabwean took a flight attendant hostage in an attempt to enter the aircraft's cockpit and divert the aircraft to Maputo, Mozambique. He was subdued while still in the cabin. The pilots had been monitoring the incident via CCTV, and the aircraft returned to Cape Town where a police task force stormed the aircraft and arrested the suspect.
- On 6 November 2018, an Airbus A340-600 (ZS-SNF) operating Flight SA260 over Switzerland, encountered an overspeed warning due to the aircraft entering a wind convergence zone. The aircraft was en route at FL380 over Switzerland about 40 nm south-southeast of Zurich (Switzerland) when the aircraft reached a speed of Mach 0.89. The pilot in command deactivated the autopilot and initiated a climb to FL400 in order to reduce the aircraft speed. The acceleration caused an Angle of Attack warning, which the flight crew misinterpreted as being a malfunction. Subsequently, two of the three AIRDUs were deactivated. This also deactivated the auto throttle and deactivated some protection, causing the aircraft to enter a near stall state. The situation was recovered at FL340, with the pilots saying that they temporarily lost control of the aircraft. The investigation revealed that the checklists were not followed and the pilots were not properly trained on handling overspeed events. The pilots were not informed that a bulletin addressing the Angle of Attack warning system was already implemented. They also found out that one of the copilots held a CPL instead of the ATPL required by the airline. The flight continued to Frankfurt for a safe landing, where the crew were interviewed by the German authorities. Germany's BFU, which led the investigation, reported the aircraft event as a serious incident.
- On 24 February 2021, an Airbus A340-600 operating as Flight SA4272 sent from Johannesburg to Brussels to fetch COVID-19 vaccines encountered an "alpha floor event" sent by the ACARS unit of the plane. This was activated when the Airbus A340-600's envelope protection system activated to override the pilots to prevent the plane from stalling on take-off.
- On 12 November 2022, an Airbus A320-200 (ZS-SZJ) being towed collided into a parked FlySafair Boeing 737-800 (ZS-SJH) at O. R. Tambo International Airport. No passengers were on board either aircraft at the time. The FlySafair aircraft's empennage section and SAA aircraft's wing tip were damaged. As a result, both aircraft were rendered inoperable.
- On 11 May 2026, an Airbus A320-200 (ZS-SZH) operating Flight SA313 from Johannesburg to Cape Town was forced to divert to George after a failed landing attempt in Cape Town caused by a windshear warning on approach. Enroute to George however, the crew were informed of similar poor conditions at George Airport, leading to the crew electing to continue an additional 150 nautical miles east towards Chief Dawid Stuurman International Airport in Gqeberha. When the aircraft finally landed in Gqeberha, it was discovered that only 420kg or about 10 minutes of fuel remained in the aircraft's fuel tanks. The South African Civil Aviation Authority is currently investigating the incident.

== See also ==
- Tourism in South Africa
- Airlines of Africa
- Airlink – Regional airline in South Africa
- Congo Express – Airline of the Democratic Republic of the Congo
- List of companies of South Africa
- Mango – Low-cost airline of South Africa (2006–2021)
- South African Express – Regional airline of South Africa (1994–2020)
- Wikipedia category of airports in South Africa
- Dudu Myeni – South African businesswoman (1963–2024)
- Malusi Gigaba – South African politician

== Bibliography ==
- Fifty years of flight. Johannesburg: SAA P.R. Dept./Da Gamma Publ. 1970.
- South African Airways in pictures. Capetown: SAA P.R. Dept. 1973.
- Spring, I. (1996). Winged springboks 1934-1996. Spring Air Publication.
- Friedberg, L. (2021). The flying springbok. John Hunt Publishing.
