= South African Airways Flight 228 =

1968 aviation accident

- Wreckage of Flight 228

Accident
- Date: 20 April 1968
- Summary: Controlled flight into terrain due by pilot error, spatial disorientation, and design flaw and GPWS malfunction
- Site: 5.3 km (3.3 mi) east of Strijdom International Airport, Windhoek, Namibia; 22°26′58″S 17°32′02″E

Aircraft
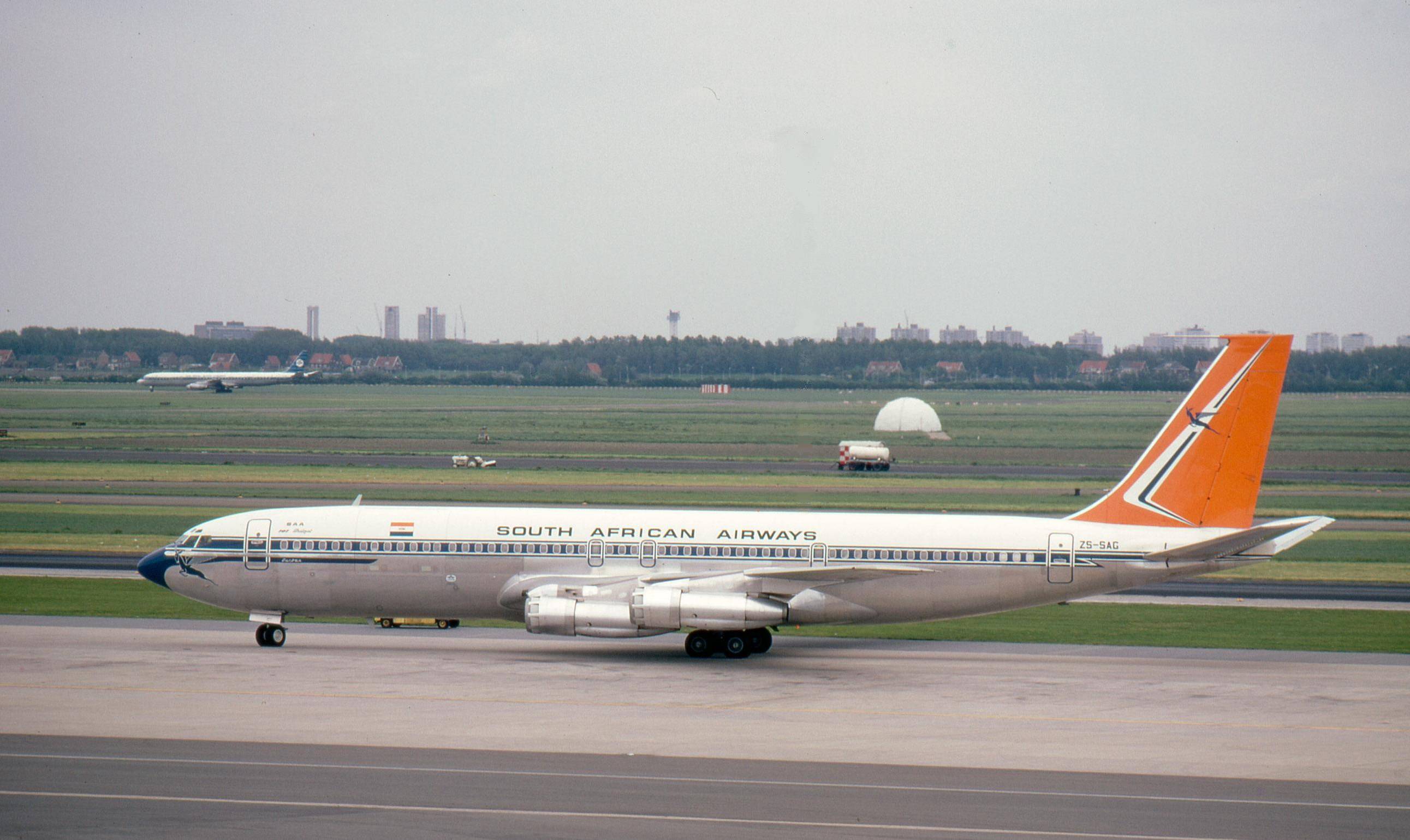
- A South African Airways Boeing 707-344C, similar to the accident aircraft
- Aircraft type: Boeing 707-344C
- Aircraft name: Pretoria
- Operator: South African Airways
- IATA flight No.: SA228
- ICAO flight No.: SAA228
- Call sign: SPRINGBOK 228
- Registration: ZS-EUW
- Flight origin: Jan Smuts Int'l Airport, Johannesburg, South Africa
- 1st stopover: Strijdom Int'l Airport, Windhoek, Namibia
- 2nd stopover: Presidente Craveiro Lopes Airport, Luanda, Angola
- 3rd stopover: Gando Airport, Las Palmas, Canary Islands, Spain
- 4th stopover: Frankfurt Airport, Frankfurt am Main, West Germany
- Destination: Heathrow Airport, London, United Kingdom
- Occupants: 128
- Passengers: 116
- Crew: 12
- Fatalities: 123
- Injuries: 5
- Survivors: 5

South African Airways Flight 228 was a scheduled flight from Johannesburg, South Africa, to London, England. The Boeing 707 operating the flight, which was only six weeks old, flew into the ground soon after take-off after a scheduled stopover in Windhoek, South West Africa (present day Namibia) on 20 April 1968. Five passengers survived, while 123 people died. The subsequent investigation determined that the accident was attributable largely to pilot error; the manufacturer subsequently also recognised the lack of a ground proximity warning system in its aircraft. The accident is the deadliest aviation accident to date in Namibia.

== Background ==
=== Aircraft ===
The aircraft involved, manufactured in 1968, was a Boeing 707-344C registered as ZS-EUW with serial number 19705. In its six weeks of service, the aircraft had logged 238 airframe hours.

=== Crew ===
In command was Captain Eric Ray Smith (49), with First Officer John Peter Holliday (34), Relief First Officer Richard Fullarton Armstrong (26), Flight Navigator Harry Charles Howe (44), and Flight Engineer Phillip Andrew Minnaar (50).

=== Flight route ===
The flight route was Jan Smuts International Airport, Johannesburg, to Heathrow Airport via Windhoek, Luanda, Las Palmas, and Frankfurt. The first leg of the flight from Johannesburg to JG Strijdom Airport, Windhoek, South West Africa, was uneventful. An additional 46 passengers embarked in Windhoek, and some airfreight was unloaded and loaded. The aircraft took off from Windhoek on runway 08 at 18:49 GMT (20:49 local time). It was a dark, moonless night with few, if any, lights on the ground in the open desert east of the runway; the aircraft took off into what was described in the official report as a "black hole". The aircraft initially climbed to an altitude of 650 feet (198 m) above ground level, then leveled off after 30 seconds and started to descend.

=== Accident ===
Fifty seconds after take-off, it flew into the ground in flight configuration at a speed of approximately 271 knots (502 km/h; 312 mph). The Boeing 707's four engines were the first parts of the aircraft to touch the ground, creating four deep gouges in the soil before the rest of the aircraft struck the ground and broke apart. Two fires erupted immediately when the aircraft's fuel tanks ignited. Although the crash site was only 5,327 metres (17,477 ft) from the end of the runway, emergency services took 40 minutes to reach the scene due to the rugged terrain. Nine passengers seated in the forward section of the fuselage initially survived, but two died soon after the accident, and two more passed away a few days later, bringing the final death toll to 123 passengers and crew members.

== Investigation ==
The investigation was complicated by the fact that the aircraft did not have a flight data recorder or cockpit voice recorder; the devices became mandatory from 1 January 1968, but the airline's inability to procure recorders meant that several SAA aircraft, including ZS-EUW, did not yet have the equipment fitted. Captain Smith had 4,608 flying hours on the Boeing 707, but only one hour (which was in training) on the new type 344C. The official investigation concluded that the aircraft and its four engines were in working order— primary fault lay with the captain and first officer, as they "failed to maintain a safe airspeed and altitude and a positive climb by not observing flight instruments during take-off"; no blame was attributed to the third pilot, whose responsibility it was to monitor the radio, and who was unable to monitor the flight instruments from his position in the cockpit. Secondary factors that may have contributed to the accident included:

- Loss of situational awareness
- The crew had no visual reference in the dark, leading to spatial disorientation.
- The crew used a flap retraction sequence from the 707-B series which retracted flaps in larger increments than desirable for that stage of the flight, leading to a loss of lift at 600 ft (180 m) above ground level.
- Temporary confusion on the part of the pilots when reading the vertical speed indicator, which was different from the A and B series of the aircraft to which they were accustomed.
- The drum-type altimeter fitted to the aircraft, was notoriously difficult for pilots to read; the crew may have misread their altitude by 1,000 feet (305 m).
- Flight deck distraction as the result of a bird strike or other minor occurrence.

After investigating this accident, as well as a number of others that also involved controlled flight into terrain, the Federal Aviation Administration determined that a ground proximity warning system would have helped prevent some of the accidents. New regulations were therefore introduced from February 1972 requiring all turbojet aircraft to be fitted with the system.

== See also ==
- Sensory illusions in aviation
- Garuda Indonesia Flight 152 another plane crash on approach when the GPWS didn't sound and also caused by pilot error in similar way.
