= Dudu Myeni =

South African businesswoman (1963–2024)

Chair: SAA
- In office January 2015 – October 2017

Non-executive director: SAA
- In office September 2009 – October 2017

Acting chair: SAA
- In office December 2012 – December 2015

Executive chair: Jacob Zuma Foundation
- In office September 2008 – May 2020

Personal details
- Born: 29 October 1963 South Africa
- Died: 14 June 2024 (aged 60) KwaZulu-Natal, South Africa
- Party: African National Congress
- Education: Madadeni College; Umlazi College
- Profession: Businesswoman

Duduzile "Dudu" Cynthia Myeni (29 October 1963 – 14 June 2024) was a South African businesswoman, a chairperson of South African Airways SOC Limited, and executive chairperson of the Jacob Zuma Foundation since September 2008.

She is known for her controversial involvement with South African Airways and as a close friend of former president Jacob Zuma.

During the Zondo Commission of inquiry into state capture the former chief operating officer of Bosasa, Angelo Agrizzi, testified that Myeni received monthly illicit payments of R300,000 in cash from them, that was to be given to former president Zuma.

On 27 May 2020 in the Pretoria High Court, Judge Ronel Tolmay declared Myeni a Delinquent Director, banning her for life from holding any directorship position. Myeni died from cancer on 14 June 2024, at the age of 60.

== Background ==
Myeni was born on 29 October 1963. She obtained her Primary Teachers Certificate from Madadeni College and her Secondary Teachers Diploma from Umlazi College. In 2009 the SAA annual report listed a bachelor's degree in administration from the University of Zululand among her qualifications. It was removed the following year after Myeni admitted she was "studying toward it" with two majors outstanding. She was listed as one of the participants in South African mining company Gold Fields' BEE partner Invictus Consortium.

=== Directorships ===
Myeni founded a consulting firm Skills Dynamics in 1999 which has facilitated a number of social development programmes on behalf of various Government Departments and major corporations in and around Richards Bay.

As of 2015 she was also a board member of the Jacob Zuma Foundation as well as vice-president of the African Water Association, Chairperson of the South African Association of Water Utilities and the Mhlathuze Water Board, Director of Trade and Investment Kwazulu-Natal.

In May 2020 the Pretoria High Court declared Myeni a Delinquent Director and barred her from holding any directorship position at any entity for life after the Organisation Undoing Tax Abuse (OUTA) and South African Airways Pilots Association (SAAPA) brought Myeni to court over her conduct and actions during her period as chairman of the South African Airways (SAA) board.

Judge Ronel Tolmay concluded "This court cannot but find that she failed abysmally in executing her fiduciary duty. In my view, a lifelong delinquency order is appropriate. Ms Myeni is not a fit and proper person to be appointed as a director of any company, let alone a State-owned enterprise".

== South African Airways ==
Myeni was first appointed to South African Airway's board of directors in 2009. She was appointed chairperson of the board in 2012 following the simultaneous resignation of eight of its fourteen board members including the company's then-chairperson Cheryl Carolus. In 2012/13 she had then-acting chief executive, Vuyisile Kona removed from his position at the airline amid accusations that Myeni organised the airline's security service to spy on him.

In January 2014 six non-executive directors of the state-owned South African Airways wrote to the then-minister for Public Enterprises, Malusi Gigaba, of their "major dissatisfaction" with Myeni's leadership. In March 2014 the new chief executive, Monwabisi Kalawe, accused Myeni of corruption after paying for documents that allegedly showed Myeni had foreign bank accounts worth €18.5-million. These documents were proven to be fake and led to disciplinary proceedings against Kalawe. In May 2014 Myeni accused Kalawe of serious governance breaches, an accusation Kalawe disputed, prompting Gigaba to state his "full confidence" in Kalawe following Gigaba's call for the state-owned airline to fix its long-troubled management problems. Gigaba went on to state that he would "deal with" Myeni for her dispute with Kalawe. Within a week of Gigaba's statement, he was shuffled by president Zuma to the Department of Home Affairs. Gigaba was replaced by Lynne Brown as minister for Public Enterprises. Upon Zuma's request, Brown replaced Myeni's critics at the airline, keeping Myeni in her position and instructing Myeni to reinstate Kalawe as chief executive, an instruction that Myeni ignored.

In March 2015 South African Airways signed an agreement with Airbus as part of the airline's turnaround plan to lease five Airbus A330s. In October 2015, without involving South African Airways executives, Myeni informed Airbus that the airline would be renegotiating the agreement to instead be an outright sale to an unnamed third party that would purchase the planes on SAA's behalf. This raised concerns around corruption by-passing normal procurement process and triggered a clause in the original agreement that any renegotiation of the agreement would need to be approved by the Ministry of Finance. In an editorial, Myeni stated that the reason why a third-party rental company was needed was to mitigate the impact of volatile exchange rates on the running costs of the aircraft, thereby reducing the airline's foreign-currency exposure.

In early December 2015, the then-Minister of Finance, Nhlanhla Nene, rebuffed Myeni's request to renegotiate the deal. This was one of the suspected causes for the controversial replacement of Nene as minister by president Zuma with David van Rooyen a week later. This caused a public outcry and a strongly negative reaction by international markets that led to van Rooyen's replacement four days later by the better known former minister of finance Pravin Gordhan (2009–2014). Gordhan rejected Myeni's request and instead announced that the original agreement to lease the planes would be implemented.

=== Delinquent director judgement ===
In March 2017, the Organisation Undoing Tax Abuse (OUTA) and the South African Airways Pilots' Association (SAAPA) brought an application in the Pretoria High Court for an order to declare Myeni a Delinquent Director in terms of section 162(5) of the South African Companies Act 71 of 2008.

The application was based on Myeni's conduct whilst chair of the SAA board. During those five years (2012/13 to 2016/17)‚ SAA ran up losses of R16.844bn‚ although it had previously been profitable.

To ensure that the delinquency trial could be completed in the allotted five weeks, a decision was made to lead evidence on only two of the cases of alleged misconduct: the ‘Emirates deal’ and the ‘Airbus swap transaction’.

OUTA and SAAPA called six witnesses against Myeni, including four former SAA executives. Myeni was the only witness in her own defence.

In closing argument, the counsel for the plaintiffs, Advocate Carol Steinberg, said during her time at SAA, Ms Myeni blocked, delayed and obstructed important initiatives to turn the airline around. She broke the law and flouted basic governance principles.

The evidence in court showed a pattern of repeated misconduct: dishonesty, obstruction and interference, improperly inserting middlemen and governance failures.

Accused of bringing the embattled SAA to its knees, and based on her actions during her five-year tenure as chairperson of the SAA board, Myeni was declared a Delinquent Director and banned from holding any directorship position for life by Judge Ronel Tolmay at the Pretoria High Court on 27 May 2020.

Strongly critical of Myeni's actions, Judge Tolmay commented "She was a director gone rogue; she did not have the slightest consideration for her fiduciary duty to SAA". As the presiding judge she concluded "This court cannot but find that she failed abysmally in executing her fiduciary duty. In my view, a lifelong delinquency order is appropriate. Ms Myeni is not a fit and proper person to be appointed as a director of any company, let alone a SOE".

The judge also awarded costs against Myeni.

The judgement now goes to the National Prosecuting Authority so a criminal case can be pursued.

On 15 February 2021, Myeni failed in her attempt to suspend the delinquency order against her. The full bench of the North Gauteng High Court struck Myeni's case off the roll, resulting in Myeni having to immediately step down from all director positions held.

=== Zondo Commission ===
In 2019 the former chief financial officer of SAA, Phumeza Nhantsi, gave testimony at the Zondo Commission of Inquiry into Allegations of State Capture implicating Myeni in illegal activities when Myeni was chairperson of SAA. On 5 November 2020, she repeatedly revealed the identity of a secret state witness, in violation of the terms set by the commission. This resulted in Judge Zondo requesting that criminal charges be laid against Myeni.

On 4 January 2022, Part 1 of the Zondo Commission Report was published. It recommended that Myeni be charged with corruption and fraud due to her activities at SAA.

Myeni was arrested on fraud and corruption charges in September 2023.
