= E-toll (South Africa) =

Electronic toll collection by SANRAL, South Africa, since 2013

e-toll
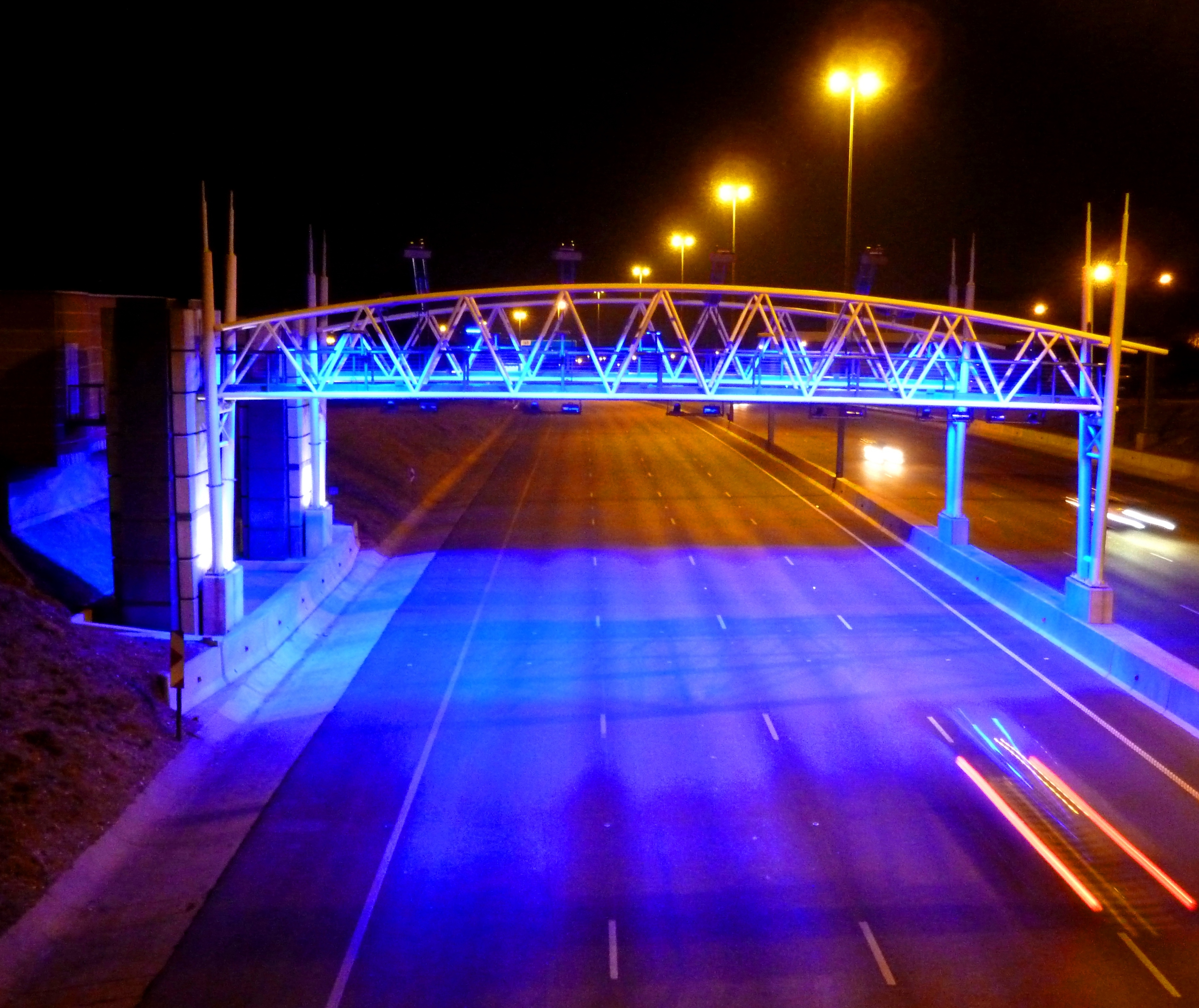
- Location: Gauteng
- Launched: December 3, 2013; 12 years ago
- Discontinued: April 12, 2024; 2 years ago
- Currency: Rand
- Website: sanral.co.za

e-toll (in South Africa) consisted of the electronic toll collection (ETC) processes employed by South Africa's roads agency SANRAL on selected toll roads or toll lanes in the Gauteng province, subject to the Sanral Act of 1998. SANRAL derives its income both from toll income and the national fiscus, while initial capital outlay for large projects are funded by open market bond issues. In total SANRAL manages 13,000 km of non-toll roads in South Africa, besides the majority (or 2,952 km) of its toll roads, including 187 km of Gauteng's freeways which were subject to e-toll.

The two main ETC methods were "Boom-down" electronic toll collection and open road tolling (ORT). The systems were designed to fund the R20 billion highway upgrade program (GFIP or Gauteng Freeway Improvement Project) which was implemented in 2007 and largely completed by April 2011. Open road tolling went live in Gauteng province on December 3, 2013, when the province had some 3.5 million registered vehicles.

In October 2022, it was announced that e-tolling on Gauteng freeways would be shut down. It was also announced that customers who paid their e-tolls would be refunded their money. It was agreed that the R20 billion needed by SANRAL to pay back creditors for the Gauteng Freeway Improvement Project (GFIP) would be granted to them by the Gauteng Provincial Government (30%) and the National Treasury of South Africa (70%).

However, by 2023, e-tolls were not yet officially shut down on the Gauteng freeways by the Ministry of Transport (they still charged motorists). The South African government then announced on 28 March 2024 that e-tolls in Gauteng would officially be scrapped and gantries would be shut down by the end of the 11th of April 2024, at midnight.

== Electronic toll collection ==
Vehicles are identified electronically without any cash transactions taking place on the road or highway. Vehicle identification is facilitated by an e-tag or a vehicle license plate number which is recorded by overhead cameras installed on gantries, and interpreted by computer. Electronic Toll Collection (Pty) Ltd (ETC), a subsidiary of Kapsch TrafficCom AG, is the contracted company that designed, built and is still operating the system, and in turn oversees the Transaction Clearing House (TCH) which oversees customer accounts, and the Violation Processing Centre (VPC) which would follow procedures against payment defaulters.

Initially, e-tagged road users received a 48 percent discount on tariffs and their monthly bill was capped. Owning an e-tag is however not compulsory, and consequently does not require any enforcement. Tariffs were increased in line with inflation, but the May 2015 amendments entailed significant reductions. Bills were mailed to road users who were not registered on the eTag system. During the review of the system and the subsequent consultation process, Sanral delayed in sending final demands to those who had not settled their accounts.

== Boom-down ==
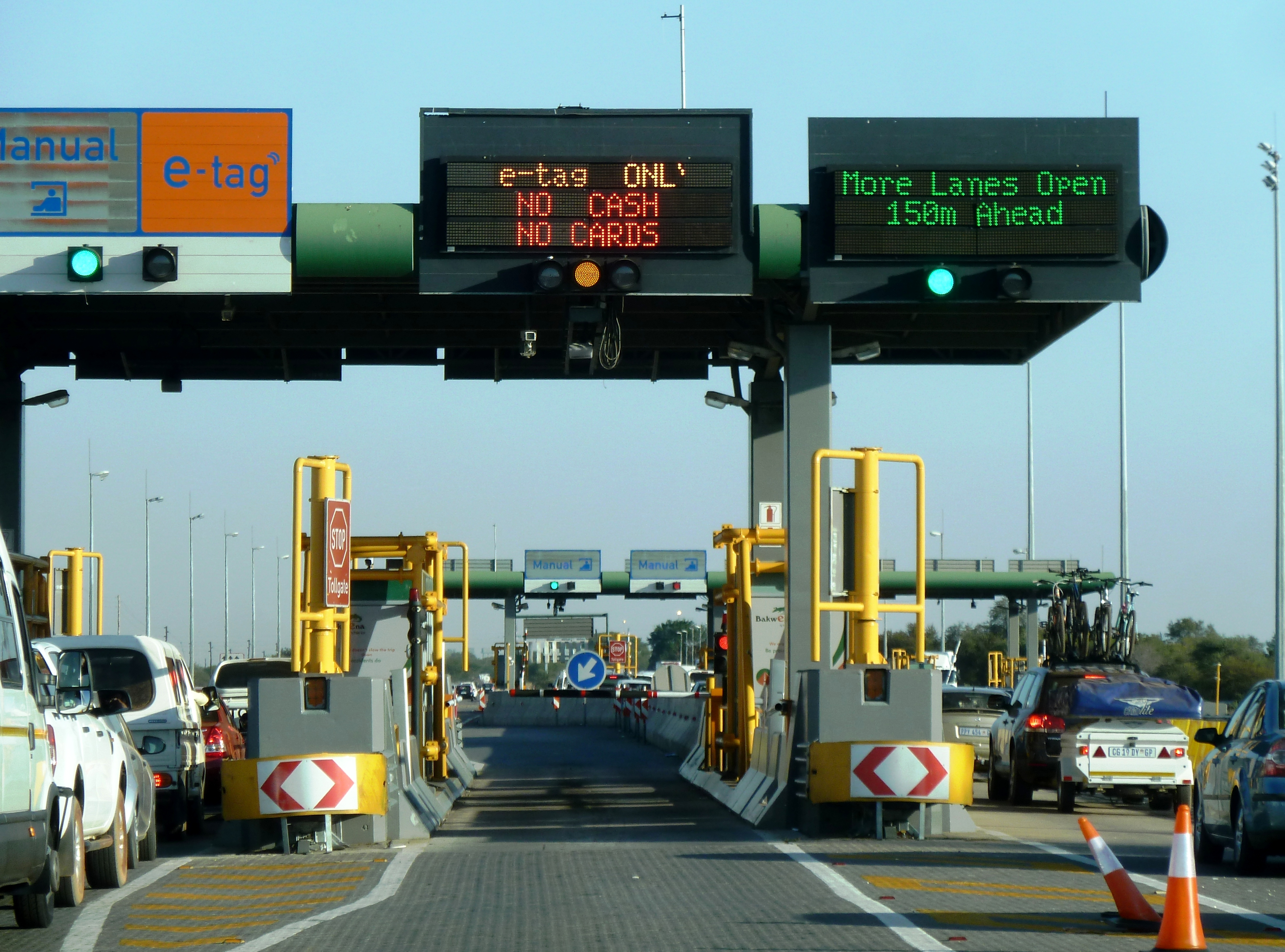
e-tag lane on the N1 at the Carousel toll plaza, northern Gauteng

At conventional toll plazas, in lanes marked with the e-tag sign, overhead equipment register and verify the details of an e-tag in a slow-moving vehicle, and an amount is deducted from the road user's toll account, whereupon the boom lifts, or a light turns green.

== Open road tolling ==
The multi-lane free flow ETC system operated without any toll booths. Cameras and other sensors mounted on overhead gantries register either the e-tag or the vehicle license plate number, and an amount was deducted from an eTag registered road user's account. For verification each vehicle was photographed from above for length classification, with additional photos of the front and rear number plates. The 43 overhead gantries are spaced at about 10 km intervals on the N1, N3, N12 and R21 highways.

The highways that were subject to e-toll include the entire Johannesburg Ring Road (N1 Western Bypass; N3 Eastern Bypass; N12 Southern Bypass), the entire freeway section of the R21 (from Pretoria to the Rietfontein Interchange in Boksburg North), the Danie Joubert Freeway (the N1 from the Proefplaas Interchange east of Pretoria CBD to the Brakfontein Interchange in Centurion), the N1 section of the Ben Schoeman Freeway (Brakfontein Interchange in Centurion to Buccleuch Interchange in Sandton), the N12 section from the George Bizos Interchange in Bedfordview to the R51 Daveyton interchange and the N3 section from the Elands Interchange in Germiston to the R554 Heidelberg Road Interchange in Alberton.

== Opposition and impact ==
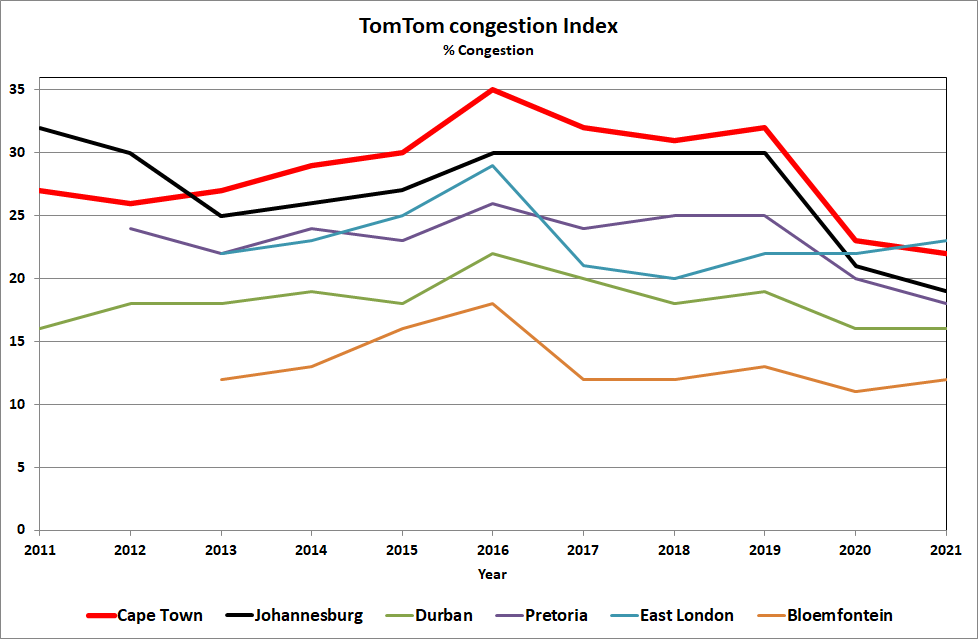
South Africa's most congested cities using the TomTom congestion index. Johannesburg's index (black) decreased after implementation of the Gauteng Freeway Improvement Project (GFIP)

The system was widely denounced, and poor compliance affected SANRAL's credit rating. A public coalition known as 'Opposition to Urban Tolling Alliance', later renamed Organisation Undoing Tax Abuse (OUTA), launched initiatives to frustrate e-tolling's implementation, and a trade union, law firm and church were among the dissenting voices. OUTA believed the system to be unlawful and approached the high court in 2012, which ruled that the GFIP was lawfully instituted, but denied SANRAL a punitive costs order. In 2014 OUTA launched the Rule of Law campaign and promised to challenge the legality of procedures against payment defaulters.

In the first six months the overdue toll fees of unregistered road users accrued to R1 billion, and the Gauteng government acknowledged the dissatisfaction of motorists. Its transport MEC, Ismail Vadi, however clarified that e-tolling in the province would remain, though a provincial fuel levy, provincial tax or shadow tolling may be considered as alternatives for future upgrade projects. Gauteng relied on significant fuel levy increases up to 2014.

In 2014 the Gauteng premier David Makhura established an advisory panel to review the socio-economic impact of e-tolling, but no review of the GFIP was anticipated. In the hearings opposition parties heaped scorn on the system, while the ruling party seemed divided on the matter.

The 2015 consultation process led by deputy president Cyril Ramaphosa concluded GFIP policy and financing matters. The government accepted the advisory panel's report which stated that the GFIP had benefited the province's economy by reducing travel times, improving fuel efficiency, reducing vehicle operating costs and by additional logistical efficiencies.

In November 2015, a news report indicated that the camera systems on the gantries did not have calibration certificates required by the National Regulator for Compulsory Specifications. This may have implications with regards to tolls which were charged using the number plate recognition system only (i.e. no transponder/e-tag).

Soon after the Gauteng ANC established a task team in August 2018 to evaluate the scrapping of e-tolls, transport minister Blade Nzimande confirmed that e-tolls would remain to service the R67 billion still owed for constructing and repairing the freeways.

In October 2022, it was announced that e-tolling on Gauteng freeways would be shut down. It was also announced that customers who paid their e-tolls would be refunded their money. It was agreed that the R20 billion needed by SANRAL to pay back creditors for the Gauteng Freeway Improvement Project (GFIP) would be granted to them by the Gauteng Provincial Government (30%) and the National Treasury of South Africa (70%).

However, by 2023, e-tolls were not yet officially shut down on the Gauteng freeways by the Ministry of Transport (they still charged motorists). The South African government then announced on 28 March 2024 that e-tolls in Gauteng would officially be scrapped and gantries would be disconnected and dismantled by the end of the 11th of April 2024, at midnight.

== Amendments ==
In December 2014, the Transport Department published amendments to e-tolling legislation which extended e-tolling to motorists not licensed in South Africa, extended to 60 (rather than 32) days the period in which invoices must be sent, and provided for the keeping of a register of all e-toll transactions. Public transport remained exempt.

In May 2015 Cyril Ramaphosa announced a tariff decrease to 30c/km for light vehicles, capped at R225 per month (with or without an e-tag). Formerly e-tag holders paid 30c/km, capped at R450 per month, and those without an e-tag, 58c/km. Visitors to Gauteng would be exempt for the first 30 gantries passed per annum, whereafter normal fees would apply to these and additional gantries. For a limited period, e-toll fees in arrears were payable at 70c/km rather than R1.74/km, and all e-toll could henceforth be paid at post offices or online, in addition to Sanral kiosks. Individual accounts were also integrated with the eNaTIS system. Ramaphosa indicated that the e-toll system would be subsidized to an amount of R700 million per annum from the state's eventuality fund, to service a backlog which accrued to R197 billion by 2015.

e-road compliant users	distance tariffs	capped at	capped at
vehicle type	May 2015	May 2015	March 2019
Motorcycle	18c/km	R125 per month	R153 per month
Light motor vehicle	30c/km	R225 per month	R276 per month
Medium heavy vehicle	75c/km	R875 per month	R1,073 per month
Large heavy vehicle	R1.50/km	R2,900 per month	R3,556 per month

== Debt collection ==
ETC issued 15,505 summonses on motorists between 2015 and 2018, of which 24% were actually served on the payment defaulters. This proved largely ineffectual as R10.2 million was recovered from 2016 to 2018, at a cost of R4.6 million to ETC in legal fees. Consequently R1.6 billion of non-toll business was diverted to support the e-toll system.

By October 2018 the outstanding debt of Gauteng motorists approached R11 billion, and Sanral issued a final warning that they would start serving court summonses in bulk. By employing the eNaTIS system, Sanral started obtaining default judgments in 2019 against defaulters who ignored these summonses. As a state institution Sanral is not obligated to inform motorists of the judgements, and motorists consequently discover their blacklisted credit rating when applying for loans.

OUTA deemed this remedy unethical as they were in an advanced stage of a test case to determine the legality of e-tolling. The ETC's CEO, Coenie Vermaak, highlighted the tremendous cost to taxpayers of the non-paying civil disobedience campaign. Sanral borrowed R22 billion to implement the GFIP, supported by an investment grade credit rating. The revolt against e-tolls prompted Moody's to downgrade its long-term local and foreign currency global scale ratings, causing this debt to balloon to R45 billion.

Sanral has stated that only 20% of users were paying e-tolls.

== Rationale for e-tolling ==
According to Sanral, toll fees were levied selectively and employed exclusively to improve and maintain roads. The routine preventative maintenance was said to be 18 times cheaper than major reconstruction following neglect. Selective tolling removes these burdens from the national fiscus and general public, by charging only those who use the roads. The public-private sector partnerships were able to raise upfront capital independently for important infrastructure projects, without drawing on fuel levies or taxes. The GFIP (Phase 1) led to a large decrease in traffic congestion when its construction was completed in 2011-2012. Cape Town, for the first time in decades, became the most congested city in South Africa.

As of 2019 Gauteng is seen as the powerhouse of South Africa, and consequently requires a road network of permanent good quality. Construction of additional roads is said to be urgent to ensure province-wide mobility but GFIP (Phase 2), promising to add 158 km of new routes, is languishing while funds are not forthcoming. Projections of the effects of project delays and resulting cost increases suggest exorbitant future increases in fuel levies and unacceptable low mobility on Gauteng's freeways if income from e-toll cannot be relied upon.

== See also ==
- Geography of toll roads
- List of ETC systems
