= Delinquent director =

Legal reason to depose a director of a company

A delinquent director is a term used under Section 162 of the South African Companies Act 71 of 2008, which allows shareholders and other stakeholders to apply to the court to declare a director of a company delinquent.

If found guilty of serious misconduct, gross abuse of position, gross negligence, wilful misconduct or a breach of trust, a director can be declared delinquent by the court. If declared delinquent, an order will ban a person from holding a director position for at least seven years, or for life in serious cases.

The delinquency order provides a way to ensure that directors remain accountable to the company, shareholders, fellow directors and employees. It sets out to raise standards of good behaviour expected of directors, and protects the public from incompetent and dishonest directors.

== Notable cases ==
An example of a person declared a delinquent director in South Africa is Dudu Myeni, the former chairperson of SAA. Myeni was judged by a court to have "acted dishonestly and grossly abused her powers" and "exposed SAA to financial ruin".
