= October 11 =

October 11 this year in various calendars
- Sunday, 11 October 2026
Akan	Kurukwasi
Armenian	23 Sahmi 1476
Aztec	Izcalli 9, 2 Ehēcatl
Babylonian	28 Ululu, 2337 SE
Balinese pawukon	Menga, Pasah, Menala, Umanis, Paniron, Redite of Kelawu, Yama, Urungan, Pandita
Bengali	26 Ashshin, BS 1433
Chinese	Yang Earth Horse・Star Mansion; Fire Horse Year, Month 9, Day 2 (Hanlu, 12 days until Shuangjiang)
Common Era	11 October 2026 CE
Coptic	1 Paopi, AM 1743
Egyptian	28 Mechir, 2775 NE
Ethiopian	1 Ṭeqemt, 2019 Amätä Məhrät
French Republican	Décade II, Nonidi de Vendémiaire de l'Année 235 de la République
Gregorian	11 October, AD 2026
Hebrew	30 Tishrei, AM 5787
Hindu	Citrā・Vaidhṛti; Solar: 25 Āśvina, 1948 SE; Lunisolar: Pratipada, Śukla pakṣa of Āśvina, 2083 VE; Rāudra・5127 KY・1,872,859
Icelandic	Sunnudagur, 18 Haustmánuður 2026
Islamic	28 Rabi' al-thani, AH 1448 (using tabular method)
ISO week date	2026-W41-7
Japanese	1 Nagatsuki, Reiwa 8 (Kanro, 12 days until Sōkō)
Julian	28 September, AD 2026 (AM 7534)
Julian day	2461325
Korean	1 Gaedal, 4359 DE
Maya	13.0.14.0.2; 15 Yax, 2 Ik
Roman	ante diem IV Kalendas Octobres, MMDCCLXXIX AUC
Solar Hijri	19 Mehr, SH 1405
Tibetan	1 tha skar, me pho rta 2153 or 1772 or 1000

<<	October					>>
Su	Mo	Tu	We	Th	Fr	Sa
				1	2	3
4	5	6	7	8	9	10
11	12	13	14	15	16	17
18	19	20	21	22	23	24
25	26	27	28	29	30	31
2026

October 11 in recent years
2026 (Sunday)
2025 (Saturday)
2024 (Friday)
2023 (Wednesday)
2022 (Tuesday)
2021 (Monday)
2020 (Sunday)
2019 (Friday)
2018 (Thursday)
2017 (Wednesday)

October 11 is the 284th day of the year (285th in leap years) in the Gregorian calendar; 81 days remain until the end of the year.

== Events ==
=== Pre-1600 ===
- 944 – Caliph al-Muttaqi is blinded and deposed by the Turkish general Tuzun.
- 1138 – A massive earthquake strikes Aleppo; it is one of the most destructive earthquakes ever.
- 1142 – A peace treaty ends the Jin–Song wars.
- 1311 – The peerage and clergy restrict the authority of English kings with the Ordinances of 1311.
- 1531 – The five Catholic cantons defeat the Protestant canton of Zurich in the battle of Kappel.

=== 1601–1900 ===
- 1614 – The New Netherland Company applies to the States General of the Netherlands for exclusive trading rights in what is now the northeastern United States.
- 1634 – The Burchardi flood kills around 15,000 in North Friesland, Denmark and Germany.
- 1643 – A Parliamentarian cavalry force defeats a Royalist cavalry force in the battle of Winceby.
- 1649 – Cromwell's New Model Army sacks Wexford, killing over 2,000 Irish Confederate troops and 1,500 civilians.
- 1776 – American Revolution: A fleet of American boats on Lake Champlain is defeated by the Royal Navy, but delays the British advance until 1777.
- 1797 – The Royal Navy decisively defeats the Batavian Navy at Camperdown during the French Revolutionary Wars.
- 1811 – The Juliana begins operation as the first steam-powered ferry in New York harbor.
- 1840 – The Maronite leader Bashir Shihab II surrenders to the Ottoman Empire and later is sent to Malta in exile.
- 1852 – The University of Sydney, Australia's oldest university, is inaugurated in Sydney.
- 1862 – American Civil War: Confederate troops conduct a raid on Chambersburg, Pennsylvania.
- 1865 – Hundreds of black men and women march in Jamaica, starting the Morant Bay rebellion.
- 1890 – In Washington, D.C., the Daughters of the American Revolution is founded.
- 1899 – The Second Boer War erupts in South Africa between the British-ruled Cape Colony, and the Boer-ruled Transvaal and Orange Free State.

=== 1901–present ===
- 1906 – San Francisco sparks a diplomatic crisis between the United States and Japan by ordering segregated schools for Japanese students.
- 1910 – Piloted by Arch Hoxsey, Theodore Roosevelt becomes the first U.S. president to fly in an airplane.
- 1912 – First Balkan War: The day after the Battle of Sarantaporo, Greek troops liberate the city of Kozani.
- 1918 – The 7.1 M_{w} San Fermín earthquake shakes Puerto Rico. The quake and resulting tsunami kill up to 116 people.
- 1937 – The Duke and Duchess of Windsor tour Nazi Germany for 12 days and meet Adolf Hitler on 22 October.
- 1941 – Beginning of the National Liberation War of Macedonia.
- 1942 – World War II: Off Guadalcanal, United States Navy ships intercept and defeat a Japanese force.
- 1944 – The Tuvan People's Republic is annexed by the Soviet Union.
- 1950 – CBS's field-sequential color system for television is the first to be licensed for broadcast by the U.S. Federal Communications Commission.
- 1954 – In accord with the 1954 Geneva Conference, French troops complete their withdrawal from North Vietnam.
- 1958 – NASA launches Pioneer 1, its first space probe, although it fails to achieve a stable orbit.
- 1962 – The Second Vatican Council becomes the first ecumenical council of the Roman Catholic Church in 92 years.
- 1968 – NASA launches Apollo 7, the first successful crewed Apollo mission.
- 1976 – George Washington is posthumously promoted to the grade of General of the Armies.
- 1982 – The hull of the Mary Rose is recovered, over four hundred years after her sinking during the battle of the Solent.
- 1984 – Aboard the Space Shuttle Challenger, astronaut Kathryn D. Sullivan becomes the first American woman to perform a space walk.
- 1984 – Aeroflot Flight 3352 crashes into maintenance vehicles upon landing in Omsk, Russia, killing 178.
- 1986 – Ronald Reagan and Mikhail Gorbachev meet in Iceland to continue discussions about scaling back IRBM arsenals in Europe.
- 1987 – The AIDS Memorial Quilt is first displayed during the Second National March on Washington for Lesbian and Gay Rights.
- 1987 – Start of Operation Pawan by Indian forces in Sri Lanka. Thousands of civilians, insurgents, and soldiers die.
- 1991 – Prof. Anita Hill delivers her televised testimony concerning sexual harassment during the Clarence Thomas Supreme Court nomination.
- 1999 – Air Botswana pilot Chris Phatswe steals an ATR 42 from Sir Seretse Khama International Airport and later crashes it into two other aircraft at the airport, killing himself.
- 2000 – NASA launches STS-92, the 100th Space Shuttle mission.
- 2001 – The Polaroid Corporation files for federal bankruptcy protection.
- 2002 – A bomb attack in the Myyrmanni shopping mall in Vantaa, Finland kills seven.
- 2013 – A migrant boat sinks in the Channel of Sicily, with at least 359 people drowning.
- 2018 – Soyuz MS-10, launching an intended crew for the ISS, suffers an in-flight abort. The crew lands safely.

== Births ==
=== Pre-1600 ===
- 1492 – Charles Orlando, Dauphin of France, French noble (died 1495)
- 1552 – Tsarevich Dmitry Ivanovich of Russia, Grand Prince of Moscow (died 1553)

=== 1601–1900 ===
- 1616 – Andreas Gryphius, German poet and playwright (died 1664)
- 1661 – Melchior de Polignac, French cardinal and poet (died 1742)
- 1671 – Frederick IV of Denmark (died 1730)
- 1672 – Pylyp Orlyk, Ukrainian-Romanian diplomat (died 1742)
- 1675 – Samuel Clarke, English minister and philosopher (died 1729)
- 1738 – Arthur Phillip, English admiral and politician, 1st Governor of New South Wales (died 1814)
- 1739 – Grigory Potemkin, Russian general and politician (died 1791)
- 1758 – Heinrich Wilhelm Matthias Olbers, German physician and astronomer (died 1840)
- 1778 – George Bridgetower, British musician and composer (died 1860)
- 1782 – Steen Steensen Blicher, Danish author and poet (died 1848)
- 1786 – Stevenson Archer, American judge and politician (died 1848)
- 1788 – Simon Sechter, Austrian organist, composer, and conductor (died 1867)
- 1793 – Maria James, Welsh-born American poet, domestic servant (died 1868)
- 1803 – Gregor von Helmersen, Estonian-Russian general and geologist (died 1885)
- 1814 – Jean-Baptiste Lamy, French-American archbishop (died 1888)
- 1815 – Pierre Napoléon Bonaparte, Italian-French politician (died 1881)
- 1821 – George Williams, English philanthropist, founded the YMCA (died 1905)
- 1827 – Afzal-ud-Daulah, Asaf Jah V, 5th Nizam of Hyderabad
- 1835 – Ernst Sars, Norwegian historian (died 1917)
- 1835 – Theodore Thomas, American conductor, founded the Chicago Symphony Orchestra (died 1905)
- 1844 – Henry J. Heinz, American businessman, founded the H. J. Heinz Company (died 1919)
- 1865 – Hans E. Kinck, Norwegian philologist and author (died 1926)
- 1871 – Johan Oscar Smith, Norwegian evangelist, founded the Brunstad Christian Church (died 1943)
- 1872 – Emily Davison, English educator and activist (died 1913)
- 1872 – Harlan F. Stone, American lawyer and jurist, 12th Chief Justice of the United States (died 1946)
- 1879 – Ernst Mally, Austrian philosopher and academic (died 1944)
- 1881 – Hans Kelsen, Czech-American jurist and philosopher (died 1973)
- 1883 – Kristian Welhaven, Norwegian police officer (died 1975)
- 1884 – Friedrich Bergius, German-Argentinian chemist and academic, Nobel Prize laureate (died 1949)
- 1884 – Eleanor Roosevelt, American humanitarian and politician, 32nd First Lady of the United States (died 1962)
- 1884 – Sig Ruman, German-American actor (died 1967)
- 1885 – Alfred Haar, Hungarian mathematician (died 1933)
- 1885 – François Mauriac, French novelist, poet, and playwright, Nobel Prize laureate (died 1970)
- 1890 – A. V. Kulasingham, Sri Lankan journalist, lawyer, and politician (died 1978)
- 1894 – Julius Kuperjanov, Estonian educator and lieutenant (died 1919)
- 1896 – Roman Jakobson, Russian-American linguist and theorist (died 1982)
- 1897 – Nathan Farragut Twining, American general (died 1982)
- 1899 – Eddie Dyer, American baseball player and manager (died 1964)

=== 1901–present ===
- 1901 – Masanobu Tsuji, Japanese colonel and politician (died 1961)
- 1902 – Jayaprakash Narayan, Indian activist and politician (died 1979)
- 1905 – Fred Trump, American real estate entrepreneur (died 1999)
- 1909 – Sir Ken Anderson, Australian politician (died 1985)
- 1910 – Cahit Arf, Turkish mathematician and academic (died 1997)
- 1911 – Nello Pagani, Italian motorcycle racer and race car driver (died 2003)
- 1913 – Joe Simon, American author and illustrator (died 2011)
- 1915 – T. Llew Jones, Welsh author and poet (died 2009)
- 1916 – Nanaji Deshmukh, Indian educator and activist (died 2010)
- 1916 – Ahmad Abd al-Ghafur Attar, Saudi Arabian writer and journalist (died 1991)
- 1918 – Fred Bodsworth, Canadian journalist and author (died 2012)
- 1918 – Jerome Robbins, American director, producer, and choreographer (died 1998)
- 1919 – Art Blakey, American drummer and bandleader (died 1990)
- 1919 – Douglas Albert Munro, United States Coast Guard signalman, posthumously awarded Medal of Honor (died 1942)
- 1922 – G. C. Edmondson, American soldier and author (died 1995)
- 1924 – André Emmerich, German-American art dealer (died 2007)
- 1924 – Sammy McCrory, Northern Irish footballer (died 2011)
- 1924 – Mal Whitfield, American athlete (died 2015)
- 1925 – Elmore Leonard, American novelist, short story writer, and screenwriter (died 2013)
- 1926 – Jean Alexander, English actress (died 2016)
- 1926 – Yvon Dupuis, Canadian politician (died 2017)
- 1926 – Thích Nhất Hạnh, Vietnamese monk, author, and poet (died 2022)
- 1926 – Earle Hyman, American actor (died 2017)
- 1926 – Neville Wran, Australian lawyer and politician, 35th Premier of New South Wales (died 2014)
- 1927 – Princess Joséphine Charlotte of Belgium (died 2005)
- 1927 – Jim Prior, Baron Prior, English soldier and politician, Secretary of State for Northern Ireland (died 2016)
- 1928 – Alfonso de Portago, Spanish race car driver and bobsledder (died 1957)
- 1928 – Roscoe Robinson Jr., American general (died 1993)
- 1928 – Geoffrey Tordoff, Baron Tordoff, English businessman and politician (died 2019)
- 1929 – Curtis Amy, American saxophonist and clarinetist (died 2002)
- 1930 – Michael Edwardes, South African-English businessman (died 2019)
- 1930 – LaVell Edwards, American football player and coach (died 2016)
- 1930 – Sam Johnson, American colonel and politician (died 2020)
- 1932 – Saul Friedländer, Israeli historian and author
- 1932 – Barry Jones, Australian lawyer and politician
- 1932 – Dottie West, American singer-songwriter and actress (died 1991)
- 1935 – Dan Evins, American businessman, founded Cracker Barrel Old Country Store (died 2012)
- 1935 – Daniel Quinn, American author and environmentalist (died 2018)
- 1936 – C. Gordon Fullerton, American colonel, engineer, and astronaut (died 2013)
- 1936 – Billy Higgins, American drummer and educator (died 2001)
- 1936 – James M. McPherson, American historian and author
- 1937 – Bobby Charlton, English footballer and manager (died 2023)
- 1937 – R. H. W. Dillard, American poet, author, and critic (died 2023)
- 1937 – Ron Leibman, American actor and screenwriter (died 2019)
- 1938 – Darrall Imhoff, American basketball player (died 2017)
- 1938 – Michael Stear, English air marshal (died 2020)
- 1939 – Maria Bueno, Brazilian tennis player (died 2018)
- 1939 – Austin Currie, Northern Irish lawyer and SDLP politician (died 2021)
- 1940 – Lucy Morgan, American newspaper reporter (died 2023)
- 1941 – Lester Bowie, American trumpet player and composer (died 1999)
- 1942 – Richard Wilson, Baron Wilson of Dinton, Welsh academic and politician
- 1942 – Amitabh Bachchan, Indian film actor, producer, television host, and former politician
- 1943 – Keith Boyce, Barbadian cricketer (died 1996)
- 1943 – Michael Harloe, English sociologist and academic
- 1943 – John Nettles, English actor and writer
- 1943 – Ilmar Reepalu, Swedish lawyer and politician
- 1943 – Gene Watson, American singer-songwriter and producer
- 1944 – Rodney Marsh, English footballer, manager, and sportscaster
- 1945 – Andrew Logan, English sculptor and painter
- 1946 – Elinor Goodman, English journalist
- 1946 – Daryl Hall, American singer-songwriter, guitarist, and producer
- 1946 – Sawao Katō, Japanese gymnast
- 1947 – Thomas Boswell, American journalist and author
- 1947 – Lucas Papademos, Greek economist and politician, 183rd Prime Minister of Greece
- 1947 – Alan Pascoe, English hurdler
- 1948 – David Rendall, English tenor and actor
- 1948 – Peter Turkson, Ghanaian cardinal
- 1949 – Henry Luke Orombi, Ugandan archbishop
- 1949 – Lawrence Tanter, American basketball player and sportscaster
- 1950 – Catlin Adams, American actress
- 1950 – William R. Forstchen, American historian and author
- 1950 – Amos Gitai, Israeli director, producer, and author
- 1950 – Patty Murray, American educator and politician
- 1951 – Bruce Bartlett, American economist, historian, and author
- 1951 – Miroslav Dvořák, Czech ice hockey player (died 2008)
- 1951 – Jean-Jacques Goldman, French singer-songwriter and guitarist
- 1951 – Jon Miller, American sportscaster
- 1951 – Louise Rennison, English author and comedian (died 2016)
- 1951 – Charles Shyer, American director, producer, and screenwriter (died 2024)
- 1952 – Paulette Carlson, American singer-songwriter and guitarist
- 1953 – David Morse, American actor, director, producer, and screenwriter
- 1954 – David Michaels, American epidemiologist and politician
- 1954 – Vojislav Šešelj, Serbian lawyer and politician, Deputy Prime Minister of Serbia
- 1955 – Norm Nixon, American basketball player and sportscaster
- 1956 – Nicanor Duarte, Paraguayan lawyer and politician, President of Paraguay
- 1956 – Doug Lawrence, American jazz saxophonist
- 1956 – Derek Ringer, Scottish race car driver
- 1956 – Stephen Spinella, American actor
- 1957 – Francky Dury, Belgian footballer and manager
- 1957 – Dawn French, Welsh-English actress, comedian and screenwriter
- 1959 – Wayne Gardner, Australian motorcycle racer
- 1959 – Allan Little, Scottish journalist and author
- 1960 – Randy Breuer, American basketball player
- 1960 – Nicola Bryant, English actress
- 1960 – Curt Ford, American baseball player and manager
- 1960 – Gábor Pölöskei, Hungarian footballer and manager
- 1961 – Neil Buchanan, English guitarist
- 1961 – Steve Young, American football player and sportscaster
- 1962 – Joan Cusack, American actress
- 1962 – Andy McCoy, Finnish musician
- 1963 – Marcus Graham, Australian actor
- 1963 – Brian Rice, Scottish footballer and manager
- 1963 – Ronny Rosenthal, Israeli footballer
- 1963 – Rima Te Wiata, English-New Zealand actress and singer
- 1964 – Michael J. Nelson, American actor, director, and screenwriter
- 1965 – Sean Patrick Flanery, American actor and producer
- 1965 – Alexander Hacke, German singer-songwriter, guitarist, and producer
- 1965 – Orlando Hernández, Cuban baseball player
- 1965 – Volodymyr Horilyi, Ukrainian footballer and coach
- 1965 – Lennie James, English actor
- 1966 – Luke Perry, American actor and producer (died 2019)
- 1966 – Todd Snider, American singer-songwriter
- 1966 – Stephen Williams, Welsh lawyer and politician
- 1967 – Jay Grdina, American businessman and pornographic actor
- 1967 – Artie Lange, American actor and comedian
- 1967 – David Starr, American race car driver
- 1967 – Peter Thiel, German and American entrepreneur, venture capitalist, and political activist
- 1968 – Jane Krakowski, American actress and singer
- 1968 – Claude Lapointe, Canadian ice hockey player and coach
- 1968 – Brett Salisbury, American football player and author
- 1969 – Merieme Chadid, Moroccan astronomer and explorer
- 1969 – Prince Constantijn of the Netherlands
- 1969 – Stephen Moyer, English actor
- 1970 – Chidi Ahanotu, American football player
- 1970 – Vanessa Harding, American wrestler
- 1970 – MC Lyte, American rapper, DJ, and actress
- 1970 – Andy Marriott, English-Welsh footballer and manager
- 1970 – Shin Tae-yong, South Korean footballer and coach
- 1970 – Constance Zimmer, American actress
- 1971 – Petra Haden, American violinist and singer
- 1971 – Justin Lin, American film director
- 1971 – Oleksandr Pomazun, Ukrainian footballer and manager
- 1972 – Marcus Bai, Papua New Guinean rugby league player
- 1973 – Brendan B. Brown, American singer-songwriter and guitarist
- 1973 – Greg Chalmers, Australian golfer
- 1973 – Steven Pressley, Scottish footballer and manager
- 1973 – Niki Xanthou, Greek long jumper
- 1973 – Dmitri Young, American baseball player and radio host
- 1974 – Jason Arnott, Canadian ice hockey player
- 1974 – Rachel Barton Pine, American violinist and educator
- 1976 – Dominic Aitchison, Scottish bass player and songwriter
- 1976 – Emily Deschanel, American actress and producer
- 1977 – Matt Bomer, American actor and producer
- 1977 – Igor Figueiredo, Brazilian snooker player
- 1977 – Jérémie Janot, French footballer and manager
- 1977 – Desmond Mason, American basketball player and sportscaster
- 1977 – Rhett McLaughlin, American YouTuber
- 1977 – Ty Wigginton, American baseball player
- 1978 – Carl Bussey, American soccer player
- 1978 – Trevor Donovan, American actor
- 1978 – Takuya Kawaguchi, Japanese footballer
- 1979 – Jamar Beasley, American football player
- 1979 – Andy Douglas, American wrestler
- 1979 – Kim Yong-dae, South Korean footballer
- 1980 – Nyron Nosworthy, English-born Jamaican footballer
- 1982 – Cameron Knowles, New Zealand footballer
- 1982 – Jeff Larish, American baseball player
- 1982 – Terrell Suggs, American football player
- 1982 – Mauricio Victorino, Uruguayan footballer
- 1983 – Denis Grebeshkov, Russian ice hockey player
- 1984 – Sergio Hellings, Dutch footballer
- 1984 – Martha MacIsaac, Canadian-American actress, producer, and screenwriter
- 1984 – Zeb Taia, Australian-New Zealand rugby league player
- 1984 – Jane Zhang, Chinese singer-songwriter
- 1985 – Nesta Carter, Jamaican sprinter
- 1985 – Yang Cheng, Chinese footballer
- 1985 – Álvaro Fernández, Uruguayan footballer
- 1985 – Peter Ölvecký, Slovak ice hockey player
- 1985 – Michelle Trachtenberg, American actress (died 2025)
- 1986 – Ikioi Shōta, Japanese sumo wrestler
- 1987 – Tony Beltran, American soccer player
- 1987 – Mike Conley Jr., American basketball player
- 1987 – Nathan Coulter-Nile, Australian cricketer
- 1988 – Omar Gonzalez, American soccer player
- 1988 – Ricochet, American wrestler
- 1989 – Michelle Wie, American golfer
- 1990 – Joo, South Korean singer and actress
- 1990 – Sebastian Rode, German footballer
- 1991 – Joel Bitonio, American football player
- 1991 – Toby Fox, American video game developer and composer
- 1991 – Gio Urshela, Colombian baseball player
- 1991 – Kika van Es, Dutch footballer
- 1992 – Cardi B, American rapper
- 1992 – Christian Davis, English cricketer
- 1992 – Riffi Mandanda, Congolese footballer
- 1992 – Ligi Sao, New Zealand rugby league player
- 1993 – Brandon Flynn, American actor
- 1993 – Hardik Pandya, Indian cricketer
- 1994 – Clésio Baúque, Mozambican footballer
- 1994 – Zior Park, South Korean rapper
- 1994 – T. J. Watt, American football player
- 1995 – Nicolás Jarry, Chilean tennis player
- 1996 – Rhea Ripley, Australian wrestler
- 1996 – Arman Tsarukyan, Armenian professional mixed martial artist
- 1999 – Leicester Fainga'anuku, New Zealand rugby union player
- 1999 – Keldon Johnson, American basketball player
- 2000 - Adin Ross, American internet personality and streamer
- 2001 – Maja Chwalińska, Polish tennis player
- 2001 – Daniel Maldini, Italian footballer
- 2001 – Jacob Preston, Australian rugby league player
- 2001 – Chu Ye-jin, South Korean actress

== Deaths ==
=== Pre-1600 ===
- 965 – Bruno the Great, Archbishop of Cologne (born 925)
- 1086 – Sima Guang, Chinese historian and statesman (born 1019)
- 1159 – William of Blois, Count of Boulogne and Earl of Surrey (born c. 1137)
- 1188 – Robert I, Count of Dreux (born 1123)
- 1303 – Pope Boniface VIII (born 1235)
- 1347 – Louis IV, Holy Roman Emperor (born 1282)
- 1424 – Jan Žižka, Czech general and Hussite leader (born 1360)
- 1531 – Huldrych Zwingli, Swiss pastor and theologian (born 1484)
- 1542 – Thomas Wyatt, English poet and diplomat (born 1503)
- 1579 – Sokollu Mehmed Pasha, Ottoman politician, 43rd Grand Vizier of the Ottoman Empire (born 1506)

=== 1601–1900 ===
- 1667 – Mattias de' Medici, Italian noble (born 1613)
- 1684 – James Tuchet, 3rd Earl of Castlehaven (born c. 1617)
- 1698 – William Molyneux, Irish philosopher and writer (born 1656)
- 1705 – Guillaume Amontons, French physicist and instrument maker (born 1663)
- 1708 – Ehrenfried Walther von Tschirnhaus, German mathematician, physicist, physician, and philosopher (born 1651)
- 1721 – Edward Colston, English merchant and politician (born 1636)
- 1725 – Hans Herr, Swiss-American bishop (born 1639)
- 1779 – Casimir Pulaski, Polish-American general (born 1745)
- 1809 – Meriwether Lewis, American captain, explorer, and politician, 2nd Governor of Louisiana Territory (born 1774)
- 1821 – John Ross Key, American lieutenant, lawyer, and judge (born 1754)
- 1830 – José de La Mar, Peruvian military leader, President of Peru (born 1776)
- 1837 – Samuel Wesley, English organist and composer (born 1766)
- 1852 – Gotthold Eisenstein, German mathematician and academic (born 1823)
- 1889 – James Prescott Joule, English physicist and brewer (born 1818)
- 1896 – Edward Benson, English archbishop (born 1829)
- 1896 – Anton Bruckner, Austrian organist, composer, and educator (born 1824)
- 1897 – Léon Boëllmann, French organist and composer (born 1862)

=== 1901–present ===
- 1904 – Mary Tenney Gray, American editorial writer, club-woman, philanthropist, and suffragette (born 1833)
- 1908 – Rita Cetina Gutiérrez, Mexican poet, educator, and activist (born 1846)
- 1932 – William Alden Smith, American lawyer and politician (born 1859)
- 1935 – Steele Rudd, Australian author (born 1868)
- 1940 – Vito Volterra, Italian mathematician and physicist (born 1860)
- 1941 – Heinrich Gutkin, Estonian businessman and politician (born 1879)
- 1941 – Mihkel Pung, Estonian politician, 11th Estonian Minister of Foreign Affairs (born 1876)
- 1958 – Maurice de Vlaminck, French painter (born 1876)
- 1960 – Richard Cromwell, American actor (born 1910)
- 1961 – Chico Marx, American comedian (born 1887)
- 1963 – Jean Cocteau, French author, poet, and playwright (born 1889)
- 1965 – Dorothea Lange, American photographer and journalist (born 1895)
- 1965 – Walther Stampfli, Swiss lawyer and politician, 50th President of the Swiss Confederation (born 1884)
- 1967 – Stanley Morison, typographer, known for work on Times New Roman font (born 1889)
- 1968 – Selim Sarper, Turkish educator and politician, 13th Turkish Minister of Foreign Affairs (born 1899)
- 1971 – Tamanoumi Masahiro, Japanese sumo wrestler, the 51st Yokozuna (born 1944)
- 1971 – Chesty Puller, American general (born 1898)
- 1976 – Alfredo Bracchi, Italian author, screenwriter, and songwriter (born 1897)
- 1977 – MacKinlay Kantor, American journalist, author, and screenwriter (born 1904)
- 1983 – R. Fraser Armstrong, Canadian administrator and engineer (born 1889)
- 1984 – Benno Schotz, Scottish sculptor and engineer (born 1891)
- 1986 – Norm Cash, American baseball player and sportscaster (born 1934)
- 1988 – Bonita Granville, American actress (born 1923)
- 1989 – M. King Hubbert, American geologist and academic (born 1904)
- 1991 – Redd Foxx, American actor and comedian (born 1922)
- 1993 – Andy Stewart, Scottish singer and entertainer (born 1933)
- 1996 – Keith Boyce, Barbadian cricketer (born 1943)
- 1996 – Eleanor Cameron, Canadian-American author and critic (born 1912)
- 1996 – Renato Russo, Brazilian singer-songwriter and guitarist (born 1960)
- 1996 – Joe Morris, English-Canadian lieutenant and trade union leader (born 1913)
- 1998 – Richard Denning, American actor (born 1914)
- 1999 – Leo Lionni, Dutch-American author and illustrator (born 1910)
- 2000 – Luc-Marie Bayle, French historian, photographer, and painter (born 1914)
- 2000 – Donald Dewar, Scottish politician, 1st First Minister of Scotland (born 1937)
- 2001 – Beni Montresor, Italian director, set designer, and illustrator (born 1926)
- 2004 – Keith Miller, Australian cricketer and pilot (born 1919)
- 2005 – Shan-ul-Haq Haqqee, Pakistani-Canadian linguist, journalist, and poet (born 1917)
- 2005 – Attilâ İlhan, Turkish poet, author, and journalist (born 1925)
- 2005 – Edward Szczepanik, Polish economist and politician, Prime Minister of Poland (born 1915)
- 2006 – Cory Lidle, American baseball player (born 1972)
- 2007 – David Lee "Tex" Hill, South Korean-American general and pilot (born 1915)
- 2007 – Werner von Trapp, Austrian-American singer (born 1915)
- 2008 – Marjorie Fletcher, English Director of the Women's Royal Naval Service (born 1932)
- 2008 – Jörg Haider, Austrian lawyer and politician, Governor of Carinthia (born 1950)
- 2008 – Ernst-Paul Hasselbach, Surinamese-Dutch television host and producer (born 1966)
- 2008 – Neal Hefti, American trumpet player and composer (born 1922)
- 2009 – Angelo DiGeorge, American physician and endocrinologist (born 1922)
- 2009 – Halit Refiğ, Turkish director, producer, and screenwriter (born 1934)
- 2012 – Avrohom Genachowsky, Israeli rabbi (born 1936)
- 2012 – Helmut Haller, German footballer and coach (born 1939)
- 2012 – Edward Kossoy, Polish lawyer, publicist, and activist (born 1913)
- 2012 – Édgar Negret, Colombian sculptor (born 1920)
- 2012 – Champ Summers, American baseball player and coach (born 1946)
- 2013 – María de Villota, Spanish race car driver (born 1980)
- 2013 – Erich Priebke, German captain (born 1913)
- 2014 – Anita Cerquetti, Italian soprano (born 1931)
- 2014 – Carmelo Simeone, Argentinian footballer (born 1933)
- 2014 – Bob Such, Australian educator and politician (born 1944)
- 2015 – Dean Chance, American baseball player and manager (born 1941)
- 2017 – Clifford Husbands, Barbadian politician (born 1926)
- 2019 – Alexei Leonov, Soviet/Russian cosmonaut and first human to conduct a spacewalk (born 1934)
- 2022 – Angela Lansbury, English-American actress, singer, and producer (born 1925)
- 2024 – Jamaluddin Hossain, Bangladeshi actor (born 1943)
- 2025 – Diane Keaton, American actress (born 1946)
- 2026 – Hiroshi Tsuchida, Japanese actor and voice actor (born 1972)

== Holidays and observances ==
- Christian feast days:
  - Agilbert
  - Alexander Sauli
  - Andronicus, Probus, and Tarachus (Roman Catholic Church)
  - Æthelburh of Barking
  - Bruno the Great
  - Cainnech of Aghaboe
  - Gratus of Oloron
  - Gummarus
  - James the Deacon (Church of England, Roman Catholic Church, Eastern Orthodox Church)
  - Lommán of Trim
  - Maria Soledad Torres y Acosta
  - Nicasius, Quirinus, Scubiculus, and Pientia
  - Philip the Evangelist
  - Pope John XXIII (Roman Catholic Church)
  - Radim Gaudentius
  - Zenaida and Philonella
  - October 11 (Eastern Orthodox liturgics)
- General Pulaski Memorial Day (United States)
- International Day of the Girl Child
- International Newspaper Carrier Day
- National Coming Out Day
- Revolution Day (North Macedonia)
