= FRW =

FRW may refer to:

- FRW, currency symbol for the Rwandan franc
- FRW metric, one name for an exact solution of Einstein's field equations of general relativity
- Federation of Rural Workers, a former Irish trade union
- Friction welding, a solid-state welding process
- Front Row Wrestling, an American wrestling promotion
- FRW, station code for the Fairwater railway station, Cardiff, Wales
- FRW, SAME code for a fire warning in the United States
- FRW, IATA airport code for Francistown Airport, Botswana
  - FRW, IATA airline designator for the defunct Bechuanaland National Airways based in Francistown
