= Lulu Rasebotsa =

Botswana corporate executive

- Born: c. 1971 (age 54–55); Botswana
- Education: University of Kent
- Occupations: Businesswoman and Corporate executive
- Years active: 1990s–present
- Known for: Business, management

Lulu Rasebotsa is a Botswana businesswoman and corporate executive, who was chief executive officer of Air Botswana, the national airline of Botswana, from 2023 to 2025.

Previously, she was the first woman CEO of Bidvest Life Insurance (previously FMI), based in South Africa, from 2021 and 2023.

== Background and education ==
Rasebotsa is a Motswana by birth, born circa 1971. She holds a bachelor's degree in mathematics and statistics obtained from the University of Kent in the United Kingdom. She also holds a Certificate of Proficiency in Insurance (COP) and an Intermediate Certificate in Business Studies (ICIBS), both obtained from the Insurance Institute of South Africa.

== Career ==
As of June 2024, her career stretched back over 25 years. She has experience in the financial services industry, specializing in insurance. She practiced as both a broker and as an underwriter. She has also worked as a pension fund administrator, in Botswana and South Africa. She worked as managing director of Liberty Life Insurance Botswana, for over 10 years, before relocating to Bidvest Life Insurance in South Africa.

As CEO of Air Botswana, she oversaw the expansion of the government-owned national carrier through fleet expansion and widening of the destinations network. Destinations under consideration include Cape Town, Durban and Windhoek–Hosea Kutako, from Gaborone, Kasane and Maun.

== Other considerations ==
Rasebotsa sits on the Industrial Advisory Board of the Department of Mathematics and Statistical Sciences of the Botswana International University of Science and Technology (BIUST) and the board of the Sir Ketumile Masire Foundation (Botswana).
