= Aviation in Botswana =

Overview of aviation in Botswana

Aviation in Botswana began with the country's first aerodrome established in 1919 on Palapye Road. This was followed by three more aerodromes. The first airmail and passenger service began in 1924, and the first commercial air service began in 1934. However, all aviation operations were suspended as the expense of World War II. Throughout the post-World War II period, the Bechuanaland Protectorate struggled to secure commercial aviation services, with most operations involving airlift mining labourers.

== History ==
=== Early aviation ===
An aerial view of the Serowe Village in the foreground and airstrip in the background, c1920s.

In late 1918, the Bechuanaland Protectorate began preparations for a proposed England-South Africa air route. Subsequently, the first aerodrome in the Protectorate was established at Palapye Road in 1919. The first aircraft that landed in Bechuanaland, at Palapye Road, was an Airco DH.9 on 16 March 1920. On 17 March 1920, a London-Cape Town expedition flew from Bulawayo to Serowe, then Palapye. This mission established another aerodrome at Serowe, facilitated by King Khama III. Also in the year, two additional aerodromes were established in Francistown and Artisia. In June 1922, Major Allister Miller received the Protectorate's first airmail contract, establishing a regular fortnightly passenger and airmail service. For this, Palapye was used as the principal location. On 16 April 1927, the first overseas landing was conducted by a Royal Air Force aircraft at Palapye.

On 18 May 1934, the first air service in Bechuanaland commenced with its first airmail flight piloted by Captain Francis. The flight used a two-passenger D.H. Leopard Moth aircraft, flying from Johannesburg to Mafikeng, then continuing to Serowe, Rakops and finally Maun. By 1935, there were 19 landing grounds in the Bechuanaland Protectorate. During the Second World War, all flights were suspended.

=== Post-World War II ===
Refuelling an AOC Dragan Rapide at Maun in Botswana, 1930s.

In the 1950s, the Protectorate government continued to negotiate for scheduled air services, however nothing came of them due to the lack of investment in communications. In 1952, the Witwatersrand Native Labour Association (WNLA) commenced an airlift between Shakawe and Francistown for workers being recruited for mines in South Africa. Following the establishment, intermediate aerodromes along the route saw increased activity. At this stage, the Bechuanaland Protectorate had a network of aerodromes, comprising with airfields at: Gaberones, Mahalapye, Francistown, Maun: landing grounds at Tshabong, Ghanzi, Shakawe: and emergency landing strips at Palapye, Makalamabedi, Mosetse, Odiakwe, Artesia, Nata (Madsiara), Kanyu, and Nokaneng. The maintenance and construction of these aerodromes and emergency landing grounds were managed under the Public Works Department. In June 1956, another airlift operating between Francistown and Mohembo and between Francistown and Lilongwe was established. This year, there were 138 flights from Nyasaland and 51 flights from Mohembo, along with 4,150 recruits from Nyasaland and 1,490 recruits from Mohembo. The aircraft were Dakotas, carrying roughly 31 recruits and a conductor. Subquentoy, Francistown became the busiest aviation hub in the Bechuanaland Protectorate.

In 1955, the Bechuanaland Protectorate (Control of Flying) Regulations came into effect, issued under High Commissioner's Notice No. 102. It established the Government's first regulations over aircraft operating in Bechuanaland, including flying qualifications, aircraft registry, and government powers to condition flying status. By early 1956, WNLA was carrying an average of 20 civilian and government passengers a month, despite its license into permitting to carry mine recruits and personnel. The resident commissioner nevertheless regarded the situation as an emergency caused by the absence of a government air service. On 26 January 1957, approval was finally given for a Bulawayo - Francis route with a fortnightly extension to Ghanzi, initially as a three-month experiential service. The first flight was scheduled for 14 February 1957, and the service lost approximately £447 after the three-month period. The High Commissioner argued to keep it due to its political advantages, and another eight months were authorised, taking trial through January 1958. This grew to become a regular air service instituted between Francistown, Maun, and Ghanzi by August 1958. By then, the British parliament had stated that the service had proved its value to the northern part of the Bechuanaland Protectorate.

In July 1958, the British parliament discussed Bechuanaland's viability for reciprocal overflight rights and search-and-rescue operations. An inspection of an airstrip for possible emergency use of the South African Air Force was earmarked, along with a reconnaissance of an emergency route through the Protectorate. In 1959, J. K. Haumann became the first applicant to register an aircraft following discussions of aircraft registration. Haumann's aircraft was a Piper PA-22 150. The first Certification of Registration was issued to Mr. Grail's Ghanzi-based Piper PA-22 160 in 1960, which was subsequently assigned "VQZ-EZ."

=== Development of civil aviation ===
On 1 September 1960, the existing service from Bulawayo to Maun via Francistown was terminated, as the Protectorate sought to reduce foreign reliance. Afterwards, Captain Herbert Bartaune's newly established Lobatse-based Bechuanaland Safaris (Pty) Ltd took over. Following the Sharpeville massacre on 21 March 1960 when police opened fire on peaceful anti-apartheid protestors, Bechuanaland Safaris began serving as an escape route for South African activists. Kasane Airfield was utilised as an intermediate stop, though fuel would have to be acquired from the nearby Victoria Falls in South Rhodesia (now Zimbabwe). In 1965, the Bechuanaland Protectorate neared independence and a complete self-governing status. The Protectorate's first flag carrier, Bechuanaland National Airways established in October 1965, commencing operating on 15 November that year. It was intended to be government airline, and Autair International helped establish it, supplying it with two Douglas DC-3s. The airline was based at Francistown, and had an ambitious network with domestic routes Francistown to Khansi via Serowe, Gaborone, and Lobatse, and Francistown to Livingstone via Maun and Serondellas.

On 30 September 1966, Bechuanaland Protectorate declared independence and became the Republic of Botswana. The International Civil Aviation Organization (ICAO) assigned nationality identifier "A2" from the previous identifier, VQZ. During the transition, Bechuanaland National Airways (BNA) became Botswana National Airways, and Gaborone was declared capital. In 1967, the Department of Civil Aviation (Botswana) is established by the Government of Botswana. On 12 October that year, the Government also signed a Standard Agreement on Operational Assistance with specialised agencies of the United Nations at Gaborone, including the ICAO. By July 1969, BNA accumulated a debt of R453,600, and the airline was placed into receivership later that year. Burton Construction took over the company, establishing the Botswana Airways Corporation in late 1969. Botswana Airways has served as the country's flag carrier ever since.

=== Growth ===
In 1971, Tumelo Mokaila graduated from Air Service Training in Perth, Scotland, becoming the first Botswanan pilot. On 4 April 1974, a Wenela Air Services Douglas DC-4 (register A2-ZER) crashed after departing Francistown on a flog)t to Malawi. 78 out of the 84 occupants onboard were killed from the accident caused by fuel contamination. By then, aviation operations involving WNLA began to decline, and Wenela Air Services later ceased operating in 1977. By the mid-1970s, the Department of Civil Aviation and the Botswana Government sought to rewrite their civil aviation framework from old British regulations. On 4 March 1975, the Civil Aviation Act (No. 15 of 1975) was passed by the National Assembly, and received assent on 1 May that year. The government was authorised to establish and maintain aerodromes, along with providing and abolishing meteorological, aviation, and communications facility. In 1976, the Air Transport (Temporary Air Service Permits) Regulations (ATRs) are published as Statutory Instrument 126 (1976). Further restructuring was done in 1977 with the enactment of the Botswana Air Navigation Regulations (ANR) published as Statutory Instrument 84 (1977). In 1978, both regulations were amended as a statutory instrument: ANRs as Statutory Instrument 82 and ATRs as Statutory Instrument 121.

In 1977, the Botswana Government began heavily funding the development of aviation infrastructure. P20,000 was allocated for Gaborone, P1,43,090 for Maun and Kasane, and P149,010 for aviation) and fire rescue. In October 1978, the Civil Aviation (Fees and Charges) Regulations, 1978 was introduced, allowing the Department of Civil Aviation to charge applications for aircraft registration, certification, inspections, and aviation services. In January 1980, an ICAO technical-assistance project was tasked with organising and staffing the DCA, establishing functioning Airworthiness, Flight Operations, and Telecommunications Engineering sections. It was also tasked with planning and coordinating aerodrome development and maintenance, along with participation of implementing the proposed new international at Gaborone.

In 1980, The Flying Mission was registered as a charity, previously being established in 1977 by Dr. Malcolm McArthur initially having a single aircraft and pilot. It grew to provide humanitarian aid, community care, and charter flight services to rural communities in the county out of its operating base in Gaborone and Maun. In 1980, Air Navigation (Prohibited Areas) Order (ANO) was established as Statutory Instrument No. 32 of that year. The Botswana Civil Aviation (Investigation of Accidents) Regulations were enacted by the Botswana parliament in 1983 and published under Statutory Instrument 49 & 66 of that year. In 1989, Botswana's first British Aerospace 146 (registered A2-ABD) was delivered to Air Botswana. It subsequently entered service on the Gaborone-Harare route, operating in conjunction with Air Zimbabwe.

=== Present ===
In 2004, the Civil Aviation Authority Act 2004 was enacted establishing the Civil Aviation Authority (CAA) of Botswana, operating as a statutory corporation of the Ministry of Transport and Communications. It took multiple years to transition into the new organisation, and on 1 April 2009, the DCA ceased operating after the CAA commenced operations.

When COVID-19 reached South Africa, Air Botswana suspended its entire scheduled domestic and regional network on 27 March 2020. The last flighted operated to Francistown, Maun, and Kasane to allow passengers to return home. During the lockdown, aircraft movements were restricted to four designated airports at Gaborone, Francistown, Maun, and Kasane. Domestic flights resumed on 12 June, partially connecting Gaborone, Maun, Francistown, and Kasane. Subsequently, the CAAB implemented extensive screening on international arrivals, and also handled the distribution of masks, gloves, and sanitiser, disinfecting aircraft, and increasing cabin cleaning between turnarounds. Air Botswana crew were also trained to handle symptomatic passengers.

During 10-12 June 2026, Botswana hosted AviaDev International at Gaborone International Convention Centre, attended by more than 600 regional and international aviation delegates.

== Statistics ==
=== Passengers ===
Year	Aircraft Movements	International Passengers	Domestic Passengers
1981	13,256		
1982	13,762		
1983	12,332		
1984	13,290	60,799	61,574
1990	26,150	168,773	131,608
1991	26,249	161,371	145,565
1992	28,502	155,501	151,444
1993	32,249	159,735	153,997
1994	26,759	203,456	156,385
1995	29,678	182,756	197,926
1996	61,073	161,232	207,445
1997	59,736	182,715	183,950
1998	66,752	204,661	199,411
1999	69,834	217,264	210,092
2000	66,951	233,134	220,356
2001	63,839	221,588	234,688
2002	59,123	240,277	237,863
2003	62,126	245,186	237,618
2004	68,349	270,660	489,787
2005	72,782	292,942	494,594
2006	76,390	286,037	509,386
2007	76,407	310,761	547,648
2008	77,534	324,291	593,874
2009	102,526	388,690	383,496
2010	74,453	397,519	377,252
2011	82,799	414,560	373,901
2012	80,167	398,557	361,955
2013	86,362	406,438	377,217
2014	83,285	413,425	342,296
2015	74,472	412,705	308,201
2016	77,079	439,103	325,043
2017	69,716	473,876	333,083
2018	81,693	500,997	358,950
2019	87,133	527,083	385,694
2020	21,283	104,348	109,333
2021	36,878	149,780	165,781
2022	63,911	351,878	300,263
2023	69,900	419,549	344,260
2024	74,638	488,588	363,562

- Blue refers to data from Statistics Botswana

=== Cargo ===
Year	International (kg)	Domestic (kg)	Total (kg)	Total (tonnes)
1994	728,306	190,192	918,498	918.5
1995	259,910	177,928	437,838	437.8
1996	330,237	214,208	544,445	544.4
1997	311,875	169,781	481,656	481.7
1998	277,310	145,324	422,634	422.6
1999	353,413	163,002	516,415	516.4
2000	524,979	171,084	696,063	696.1
2001	572,221	172,020	744,241	744.2
2002	477,232	205,678	682,910	682.9
2003	545,094	211,753	756,847	756.8
2004	716,005	204,550	920,555	920.6
2005	743,222	198,131	941,353	941.4
2006	798,084	222,208	1,020,292	1,020.3
2007	847,995	250,202	1,098,197	1,098.2
2008	840,318	227,521	1,067,839	1,067.8
2009	704,397	232,490	936,887	936.9
2010	260,246	547,115	807,361	807.4
2011	530,284	294,697	824,981	825.0
2012	978,302	26,434	1,004,736	1,004.7
2013	697,297	238,468	935,765	935.8
2014	639,343	160,607	799,950	800.0
2015	564,182	121,746	685,928	685.9
2016	496,179	86,958	583,137	583.1
2017	395,299	59,610	454,909	454.9
2018	332,708	64,232	396,940	396.9

- Blue refers to data from Statistics Botswana

== See also ==
- List of airports in Botswana
- List of airlines of Botswana

== Bibliography ==
- Guttery, Ben R. (1998). Encyclopedia of African Airlines. Jefferson, North Carolina: McFarland & Company. ISBN 0-7864-0495-7.
