= Gaborones Airport =

Former airport in Gaborone, Botswana

Gaborone Airport Notwane Airport
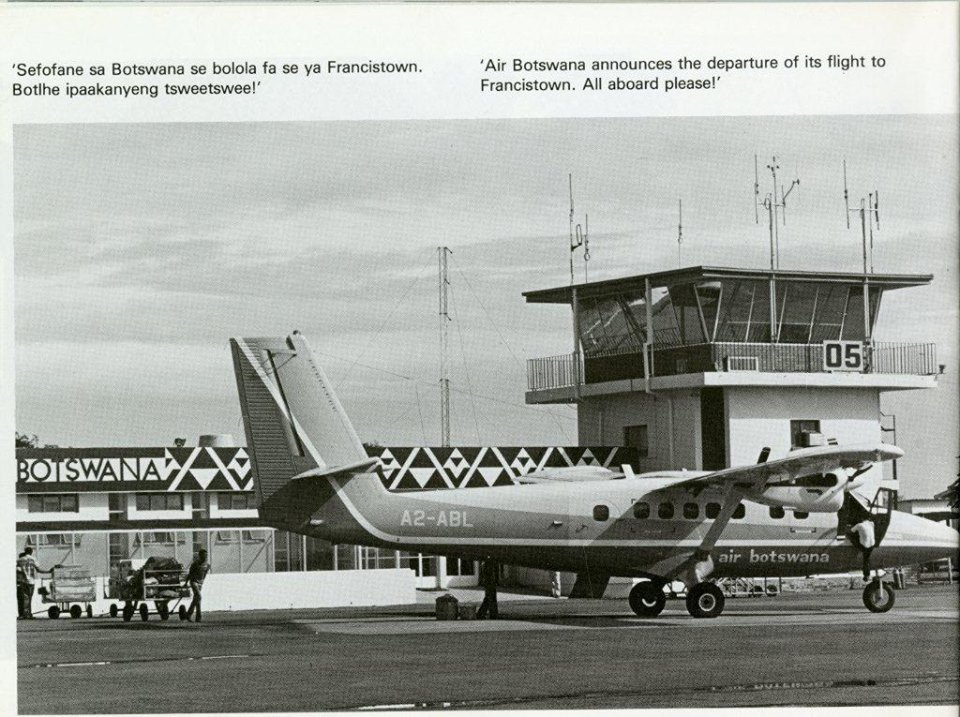
- IATA: GNE; ICAO: FBNW

Summary
- Airport type: Defunct
- Location: Gaborone, Botswana
- Closed: December 10, 1984
- Passenger services ceased: December 10, 1984
- Hub for: Botswana National Airways
- Elevation AMSL: 981 m (3,219 ft)
- Coordinates: 24°39′20″S 25°56′23″E

Map
- Location in Botswana

Runways
Direction	Length		Surface
Direction	ft	m	Surface
4/22	5,000	1,524	Paved

Gaborone Airport, also known as Notwane Airport, (IATA: GNE, ICAO: FBNW) was the principal international airport for Botswana, located in the country's capital city, Gaborone. The airport, then as a colonial airstrip serving Gaborones Fort, entered civil aviation use in the 1960s. It was home to the Kalahari Flying Club, and operations ceased on 10 December 1984 when it was replaced by Sir Seretse Khama Airport. Following closure, it remained as an air base for the Botswana Defence Force as Notwane Air Base. After Thebephatshwa Air Base opened in 1995, the former airport was demolished.

== History ==
On 27 March 1933, Resident Commissioner Sir Charles Rey went to Kanye and ordered Kgosi Gobuamang I of the BagaMmanaana to leave Moshupa and move 30 kilometres away to Kanye in Botswana. Gobuamang refused, and on 8 April 1933, Captain Reilly and Captain Mangan with 13 senior Protectorate Police officers arrived at Moshuoa to arrest him. However, the group was surrounded and forced to withdraw from Moshupa. Subsequently, Rey proposed to aerial bomb Moshupa into surrender, supported by High Commissioner Sir Herbert Stanley. It was believed to be inexpensive and would avoid European casualties. As a result, the airstrip at Gaborones Camp was prepared to receive the Royal Air Force. However, the proposal was rejected and Rey was instead authorised to seek armed assistance from Southern Rhodesia.

At the time, Gaberones Airstrip was proximal to Gaborone Camp, later known as the Government Camp housing the Police Mobile Unit. The airstrip was located west to the camp.

In 1948, Central African Airways began an air service passing through Gaberones Airport as a connecting stop between Bulawayo and Mafikeng. The route utilised an 8-seat de Havilland Dove. By the 1950s, Gaberones Airport was equipped with a 6,000 feet (1,800 m) long earthen runway. On 1 April 1950, Seretse Khama arrived at Gaberones Airport from Francistown, meeting with headmen and tribesmen allowed onto the airstrip by the British Administration. The police cordoned off the airstrip during the event, and no incident occurred before Khama left for Lobatse by car. Gaberones Airport was first recognised by the Protectorate as an airfield in the 1952 Annual Report. In October 1959, it was assigned International Civil Aviation Organization (ICAO) code "FBGR" following the rollout of ICAO location identifiers.

=== Civil aviation ===
The expansion of civil aviation operations arrived at Gaberones Airport by the 1960s. At the time, it lacked facilities, only having two dirt strips at a "T" shape. On 1 January 1961, the newly established Bechuanaland Safaris began serving Gaberones Airport. In 1962, Gaborones was selected as the new capital of Botswana, and a masterplan incorporating the airport was approved in 1963. Construction began in 1964, and the airstrip was tarred and a small airways building was erected. By 1965, a fire engine was stationed there under the control of the airport manager. The airport was one of two of the only fire engines in the country, the other under the first fire service based at the Police Mobile Unit. Bechuanaland National Airways took over Bechuanaland Safaris' service after acquiring the airline on 1 October 1965. A new service began on 15 November 1965, maintaining three connecting flights per week through the airport, utilising the Douglas DC-3.

The runway, though with a good surface tended to get soft following heavy rain. In early 1966 particularly, heavy rained caused the runway to become waterlogged and damaged. Afterwards, the government introduced signals indicating whether the surface was safe for aircraft to land. In late September 1966, Gaberones Airport began receiving political dignitaries and royal visits for the independence of Bechuanaland and its following celebrations. Princess Marina with Colonel James Thomas Atherstone Bailey and Inspector Simon Adolf Hirschfeld arrived on 27 September, and the then Governor of Hawaii John A. Burns arrived on 29 September 1966. On 30 September, the Bechuanaland colony became independent from British rule and the nation was renamed to Botswana.

Immediately after independence, Gaborone was declared capital, and Gaberones Airport was incorporated into the city plan. Notwane Road was established as the principal road leading into the airport, beginning at the roundabout of Churchill Road and North-South Ring Road, and ending with a loop road at the terminal. Directly northwest to the airport was the Notwane Golf Course, west was the University of Botswana, Lesotho, and Swaziland, and located east was the Mobile Police Unit's complex. Following Bechuanaland National Airway's ceasing of operations during independence, Botswana National Airways assumed the routes at Gaberones Airport. The new airline was based at the airport. Utilising the Vickers Viscount and Fokker F27 Friendship, it linked the airport to international destinations, including Livingstone and Lusaka in Zambia, and Johannesburg in South Africa.

=== Rising congestion ===
In 1969, the Government engaged consulting firm Sir Alexander Gibb and Partners to study the feasibility of expanding the airport. It was concluded that the runway could be expanded to accommodate unrestricted operations involving the Fokker F27, and limited use involving the Boeing 737. However, it was not possible to completely expand the runway and airside facilities without creating high noise levels in the city. At the time, the Government sought to expand the airport to accommodate the Boeing 707. This year, Gaberones Airport was renamed to Gaborone Airport following the city's name change. In 1970, the Kalahari Flying Club was established and based at Gaborone Airport, flying Piper PA-28 Cherokee aircraft. Helene Robertson served as club secretary by 1975. By 1971, it had a terminal building with customs facilities for passengers and baggage, and a designated loading and unloading area on the apron directly opposite the terminal on the west side of the runway. In August 1972, Air Botswana commenced operations and began providing international and domestic routes from the airport. During financial year 1973/74, 37,000 passengers passed through Gaborone Airport. It was capable of handling Hawker Siddeley HS 748 and Douglas DC-3 aircraft, hosting international scheduled services to South Africa and Zambia.

In 1976, a new terminal was built, aimed at improving facilities and replacing the existing one. New fire and rescue facilities were also built under the same programme. It was completed in time for the Tenth Independence Anniversary Celebrations, held in late September of that year and coordinated by Gobe Matenge. At the height of the Rhodesian Bush War, the Botswana Defence Force (BDF) began equipping itself with an aerial component to help support nationalist forces. In 1977, the BDF established an air wing, along with the acquisition of three Britten-Norman Defender aircraft. The aircraft were based at the airport, and one was lost during operations in 1978. The aircraft had provision for Sura rockets, Skyshout and extra fuel tankage. By 1977, the runway was noted to have become distorted, and required replacement or major repairs.

Subsequently improvements were done to the airport over the course of multiple years. In 1978, the apron was extended and a taxiway was constructed along with associated roads and parking areas. Along with the construction was a 694 square metres (7,470 ft^{2}) aircraft hangar and a 147 square metres (1,580 ft^{2}) attached single-storey office block. The structures utilised concrete foundation and floor slabs, and a steel-framed hangar structure with cladding. Tenders for the project were called in January 1978. Additionally, the capital expenditure for the airport was P180,000 in 1979/80, P61,000 in 1980/81, and P56,000 in 1982/83. Based in the airport's fire and rescue facilities, a medium aircraft crash tender, rapid intervention vehicle, and ambulance was acquired in 1979. The continuous upgrades aimed to keep Gaborone Airport operational until its replacement could be organised and built. By 2 January 1984, Air Botswana had maintained 22 total connecting flights per week through Gaborone Airport, utilising the Fokker F27 and Cessna aircraft. It provided a northbound and southbound service to Johannesburg in South Africa, Harare in Zimbabwe, Francistown, Muan, and Selebi Phikwe in Botswana.

=== Closure ===
By the early 1980s, Gaborone Airport could not handle newer and larger aircraft, and the construction of its replacement began in 1982. Afterwards, the legislation included the New Gaborone Airport (Controlled Area) Order, 1982, located 15 kilometers north of central Gaborone. In February 1982, the new airport's main civil works contract was awarded to Sir Alfred McAlpine & Son (Botswana), and a 3,000 by 45 meter concrete runway was built. On 10 December 1984, New Gaborone Airport, later known as Sir Seretse Khama Airport, was opened to traffic and commercial operations at Gaborone Airport ceased.

=== Notwane Air Base ===
Following closure, ownership of Gaborone Airport was transferred to the Botswana Defence Force. Avoiding confusion with the new airport, it was renamed to Notwane Airport. Progressively, units were phased out of Notwane Air Base to Francistown and Molepole. In March 1991, the Botswana Government tendered the reconstruction of a hangar built on the existing concrete slab, and also the renovation of the single-storey office block. In the mid-1990s, Squadrons Z1 and Z2 were disbanded at the airbase, while Squadron Z3 was relocated to Francistown and Squadrons Z23, Z21, and Z7 were relocated to Molepole. With the opening of Thebephatshwa Air Base in 1995, the BDF relocated to the new base and Notwane Air Base was closed shortly thereafter.

== Facilities ==
Gaborone Airport was located 7.5 km from Gaborone town centre at an elevation of 981 metres (3,219 ft) AMSL. It was equipped with a single paved runway measuring 1,524 metres (5,000 ft) long and 24 metres (79 ft) wide, headed as 4/22. It had a pavement Load Classification Number (LCN) of less than 20, and was prone to flooding. Due to the length, the largest aircraft that could use the runway was the Vickers Viscount 700, however the LCN was too low for the required strength of 20-24.

The airport terminal building had a dedicated departure hall and customs examination hall. The terminal also had retail and concession facilities including a restaurant managed by G. Tlhowe, liquor bar managed by K.D.B. Ogilvie, specialty bookstore operated by Botsalano Books (Pty) Ltd, and a duty free shop located in the departure hall operated by M.D. Segola.

== Accident & incidents ==
- During the 10th anniversary since independence, President Mobutu Sese Seko of DR Congo flew to Gaborone on a scheduled meetup with Presidents Seretse Khama of Botswana, Samora Machel of Mozambique, Julius Nyerere of Tanzania, and Kenneth Kaunda of Zambia. His aircraft arrived on 26 September 1976, which was experiencing an automatic-pilot problem at the time. It then overshot the runway and sank into the mud, requiring extraction by the South African Air Force. On 29 September 1976, Lockheed sent the necessary replacement parts and mechanics to the airport to service the aircraft.

== Bibliography ==
- Hewish, Mark; Sweetman, Bill; Wheeler, Barry C.; Gunston, Bill (1979). Air Forces of the World. Salamander Books Limited.
- Guttery, Ben R. (1998). Encyclopedia of African Airlines. Jefferson, North Carolina: McFarland & Company. ISBN 0-7864-0495-7.
- Rwomire, Apollo (2001). Social Problems in Africa. New York, United States: Praeger Publishers. ISBN 0-3130-0392-0.
