= Botswana National Airways =

Airline of Botswana

- Commenced operations: 1966
- Ceased operations: 1971
- Operating bases: Gaborones Airport
- Founder: Johnny Gibson

Botswana National Airways was an airline based in Gaborone, Botswana.

The airline took over services from Bechuanaland National Airways which ceased operations in late 1966. The airline was formed by Johnny Gibson under the leadership of D. Morgan.

After Botswana's independence, Bechuanaland National Airways was renamed Botswana National Airways. It began services on domestic and regional routes utilising Douglas DC-3 and DC-4 aircraft and later a Vickers Viscount and Fokker F-27, which saw flights being operated from Gaborone to Livingstone and Lusaka in Zambia, and Johannesburg in South Africa. Services to Bulawayo in Rhodesia were commenced in October 1966 in conjunction with South African Airways. Domestic flights were flown with a Britten-Norman Islander and a Beech Baron, with the F-27 sometimes being utilised on the Gaborone-Francistown route.

During 1967, the airline began to carry diesel fuel for the Roan Selection Trust Copper mines in Zambia and a Douglas DC-4, acquired from Philippine Airlines, was utilised in which the airline flew 32 tons of fuel daily between Francistown and Livingstone, from where it was carried by rail to the Copperbelt region.

Following the 1968 United Nations Security Council resolution banning air transportation to and from Rhodesia, Botswana National Airways was forced to cease operations to Bulawayo.

The airline suspended operations in late 1969, and was placed into receivership. The bankruptcy court deemed that it would be impossible for the airline to emerge from receivership and to recover its debts, which in July 1969 totalled some 453,600 rand.

The company was acquired by the Government of Botswana and Burton Construction in July 1969, and Botswana Airways Corporation was formed on 1 November 1969. The new company resumed some operations, before ceasing all operations by 1971.
