= Air Botswana =

State-owned flag carrier of Botswana

IATA	ICAO	Call sign
BP	BOT	BOTSWANA
- Founded: July 2, 1972; 54 years ago
- Commenced operations: August 1, 1972; 54 years ago
- Hubs: Sir Seretse Khama International Airport
- Frequent-flyer program: Teemane Club
- Subsidiaries: None
- Fleet size: 3
- Destinations: 8
- Parent company: Government of Botswana
- Headquarters: Sir Seretse Khama International Airport, Gaborone, Botswana
- Key people: Bao Mosinyi General Manager
- Website: airbotswana.co.bw

Air Botswana Corporation is Botswana's state-owned national flag carrier, with its headquarters located in Gaborone. It operates scheduled domestic and regional flights from its main base at Sir Seretse Khama International Airport. Air Botswana has been loss-making for several years, and various attempts to privatise the company, and frequent changes to its management and board, have so far failed to reduce the losses.

== History ==
=== Formative years (1972–1986) ===
Air Botswana (Pty.) Limited was founded on 2 July 1972 to succeed two failed former national airlines: Botswana National Airways (1966–1969) and Botswana Airways Corporation (1970–1971). Air Botswana Holdings was responsible for the ownership and leasing of aircraft, and served as the holding company for Air Botswana. During the early years, Air Botswana (Pty.) Limited acted as a contractor for numerous flight services, which were contracted to South African Protea Airways, via a local subsidiary, Air Services Botswana.

Flight operations began on 1 August 1972 utilising the only aircraft of the company: a Fokker F-27 Friendship. Throughout the 1970s, Air Botswana operated a round-trip route from Gaborone-Manzini-Johannesburg-Harare-Gaborone, in addition to domestic services to Francistown, Maun and Selebi-Phikwe. By the late 1970s, Air Botswana operated one HS 748, one Douglas DC-3 and one Vickers Viscount 754, the latter on lease from Protea Airways.

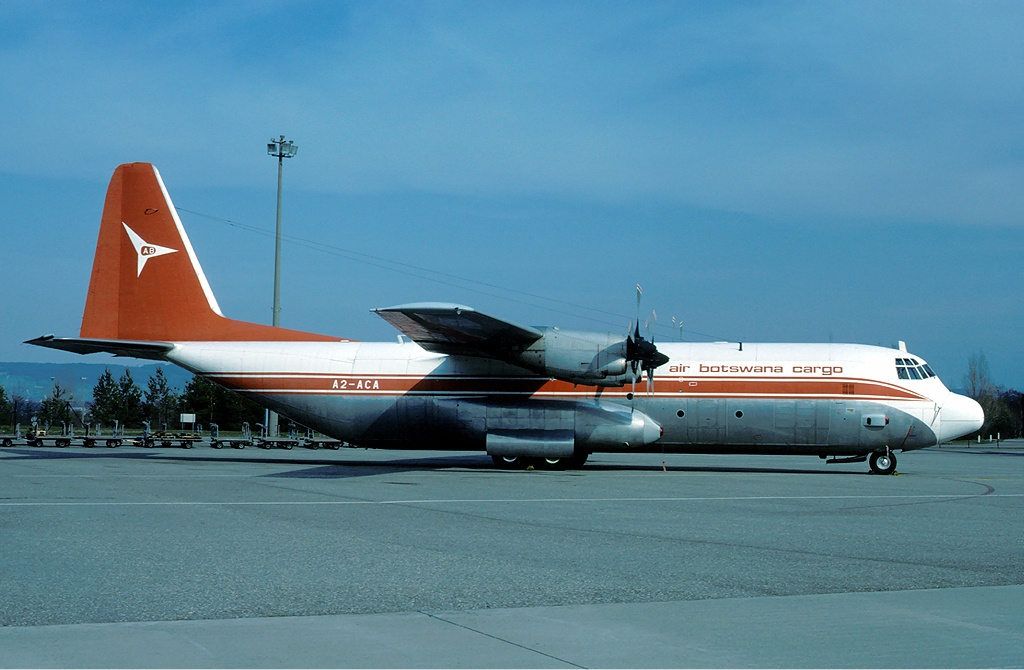
L-100-30 at Basel in 1984

The contract with Air Services Botswana for operation of the airline was not renewed, and in 1981 British Airways was awarded a contract for the operation of the airline for a six-year period. Also in 1981, Botswana Development Corporation was formed as a part of Air Botswana Holdings, with the corporation being tasked to acquire an aircraft for the airline to lease. The Fokker F27 was again chosen, and because of a lack of their own trained crews, the airline seconded crews from Comair and contracted maintenance out to Safair Freighters. In 1983 a Lockheed L-100-30 Hercules was leased and Air Botswana Cargo was formed to operate cargo charters, and when South African Airways ended services to Lesotho and Swaziland, a second F27 was acquired and services to Maseru and Manzini were inaugurated. A sixteen-seat Dornier 228-200 was leased in December 1984 from Kalahari Air Service, with the latter flying and maintaining the aircraft for Air Botswana. The 57 million pula Sir Seretse Khama International Airport opened on 10 December 1984, seeing Air Botswana operating from the airport. By the end of 1986, the route network included Gaborone, Francistown, Johannesburg, Harare, Lusaka, Manzini, Maseru, Maun, Selebi-Phikwe and Victoria Falls.

=== Government corporation ===
On 1 April 1988, Air Botswana was absorbed by the Botswana government as a parastatal corporation under the Ministry of Works, Transport and Communications as a result of the Air Botswana Act (1988), and became the nation's flag carrier. Also in April 1988, Air Botswana became the first airline from the Southern African Development Coordination Conference (SADCC) to establish air links with Namibia. Air Botswana operations are regulated by the Botswana Department of Civil Aviation, under the Civil Aviation Act (1977).

Two ATR 42–230 arrived in 1988, leading to the sale of the Fokkers, and the first BAe 146 arrived in November 1989. The BAe 146 entered service on 12 November on the Gaborone-Harare route, operated five times per week in conjunction with Air Zimbabwe, along with other destinations of the network of the airline in southern Africa. The airline also entered into block-seat arrangements with international airlines, including an agreement with British Caledonian which provided seats on the Lusaka-Gaborone sector of the London-Lusaka-Gaborone service.

In December 1992, the government enacted the Control of Smoking Act (1992), and Air Botswana became the first company in Botswana to respond to the act by banning smoking on all domestic flights in 1993, which was extended to all flights in the Southern African Development Community region in 1995. Whilst the years 1988 to 1993 saw Air Botswana incurring financial losses, in 1994 the government wrote off P74 million of the airline's losses and converted them into equity.

=== Destruction of fleet (1999) ===
On 11 October 1999, the airline was crippled when one of its pilots, Chris Phatswe, crashed an empty ATR 42 aircraft into Sir Seretse Khama International Airport, destroying the aircraft and two more Air Botswana ATR 42s. Phatswe had stolen the aircraft in the early morning, and once in the air had informed the air traffic control tower that he intended to kill himself. He requested by radio to speak to several people, including President Festus Mogae and the airline's general manager. As Mogae was out of the country, arrangements were made for him to speak to Vice President Seretse Ian Khama, who expressed his willingness to speak to Phatswe.

After the aircraft circled Gaborone for two hours, Phatswe crashed it at a speed of 200 knots (370 km/h) into the airline's two other ATR 42s, which were parked on the apron, destroying all three aircraft. The incident left the company with only a single BAe 146, which had been inoperable for a year because of technical problems, forcing the airline to lease an aircraft to operate scheduled flights. It was revealed that Phatswe had initially been grounded for medical reasons, was refused reinstatement, and was re-grounded until February 2000.

=== Privatisation attempts ===
Because the airline had been regularly posting financial losses, in part due to overstaffing, the operation of an ageing, fuel-inefficient fleet, increasing operational costs, inadequate management expertise and an inability to retain and attract qualified pilots, the government earmarked Air Botswana to be the first of the parastatals to be privatised. The costs which the airline incurs, in conjunction with low quality of service, poor marketing, high insurance premiums and a slow uptake on new technology, has restricted growth potential for the airline. However, in the five years to 2003, the government had not had to subsidise Air Botswana, and in the previous six years it had made a profit.

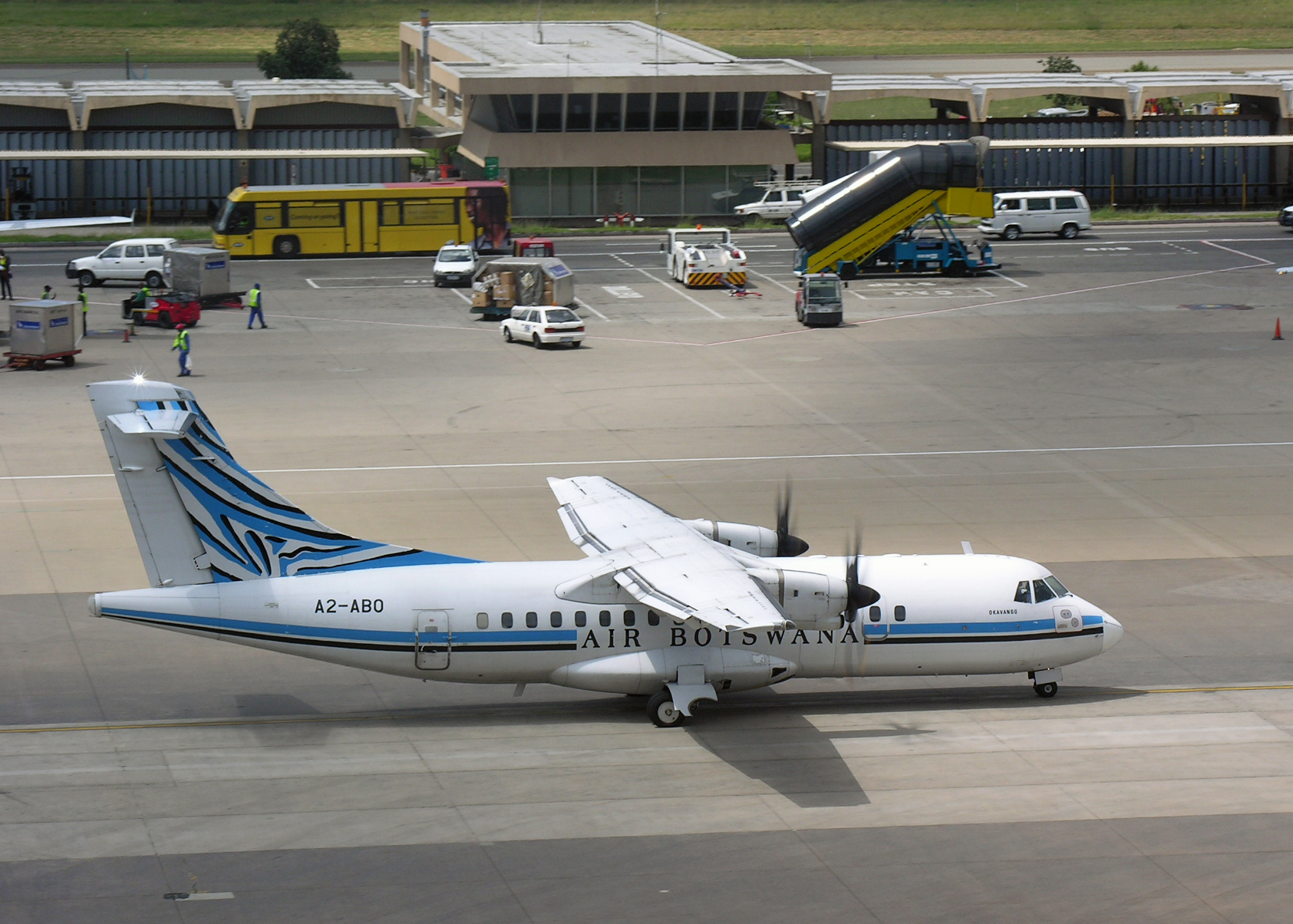
Air Botswana ATR 42–500 at OR Tambo International Airport, Johannesburg in 2005

The privatisation process began on 19 April 2000, when the government signed a consultancy agreement with World Bank-affiliated International Finance Corporation, which saw IFC being appointed as the government's main adviser in the privatisation process.

In 2003, the government attempted to privatise the airline, with Air Mauritius and Comair put forward as strategic partners. The process would have seen the winning bidder receiving a 45 percent stake in Air Botswana, with the government holding a further 45 percent, and employees holding the remaining 10 percent. It was planned that once the airline has firmed its position under new ownership, it would be listed on the Botswana Stock Exchange. Air Mauritius withdrew from the process in September 2003, citing the downturn in global air travel markets since the 11 September 2001 terrorist attacks in New York City. Comair withdrew in December 2003, due in part to increased competition by low-cost airlines in the South African market. The government suspended the search for a strategic partner in February 2004.

Following a P300 million loss in the first quarter of 2006, the Sunday Standard reported that the government hurriedly began efforts to privatise the airline before it became insolvent. The newspaper also revealed that the airline defaulted on its US$42,000 – 45,000 payments for the lease of the BAe 146 from April — July 2006, and that the arrears were paid once the airline's secretary and corporate counsel warned that non-compliance with the contracts could lead to the termination of the lease of the aircraft and expose the corporation to claims for damages, which would affect its image during the privatisation process. In September 2006 it was announced that three potential investors had placed bids for the tender to take over the airline: Airlink of South Africa, African World Airways Ltd, and Lobtrans (Ltd), a local truck fuel transporter. Shortlisted companies which did not submit bids included Ethiopian Airlines, Comair, Tourism Empowerment Group, ExecuJet, and Interair South Africa. In November 2006, the Public Enterprises Evaluation and Privatisation Agency announced that Airlink has been put forward by the Ministry of Works and Transport as the preferred bidder for Air Botswana.

It was revealed by the press that Nico Czypionka, the man responsible for leading negotiations between the government and Airlink, had convinced the government as early as April 2006 to go into partnership with the South African airline. It was alleged that the deal with Airlink was a foregone conclusion from the beginning of the process, and that other airlines had been invited to submit bids to create an illusion of fair and equitable processes. The Sunday Standard also revealed that the blueprint for the privatisation of the airline was written by Airlink CEO Roger Foster, and was used by Botswana in its negotiations with the airline, in contravention of the Botswana Privatisation Policy of 2003.

As part of the proposed deal with Airlink, it announced that Air Botswana would be wound up, and a new airline to be known as Botswana Airlink would be formed, with the government holding a controlling 50.1 percent share and the South African airline holding the remaining 49.9 percent. The new airline would have disposed of the 46-seat ATR 42s, and would instead operate 29-seat BAe Jetstream 41s, which are more suited to low traffic domestic routes. The deal would also have seen the retrenchment of all 300 employees of Air Botswana, with approximately 180 being rehired by the new airline.

The Government ceased negotiations with Airlink in October 2007, when the Cabinet reached a decision that the deal was no longer viable. A major sticking point, according to Mmegi, was that Airlink was adamant in replacing the national colours of blue, black and white, with those of South Africa. The Cabinet also believed the proposal didn't meet requirements for air transport for the country, and didn't address government objectives for the further development of transport and tourism sectors in Botswana, although the tourism industry regards Air Botswana's monopoly of air transport in Botswana, and the resultant high fares and limited schedules, to be a major constraint for the development of tourism in Botswana.

The government then began the search for a management company to operate the company for a three-year period, and also announced that the government would recapitalise the airline by injecting P100 million to improve performance and to make it more attractive for privatisation. The government entered into negotiations with Comair, but following disagreements over terms, negotiations continued with reserve bidder International Development Ireland, in conjunction with Aer Arann.

According to press reports in August 2008, Alexander Lebedev, a Russian oligarch, expressed interest in investing in the airline, and the Ministry of Works and Transport confirmed that Lebedev was invited to travel to Gaborone to present his bid to the government. Part of the bid reportedly included extending Air Botswana's route network to Düsseldorf Airport; the base of Blue Wings which is 48 percent owned by Lebedev's National Reserve Corporation. At the end of 2008, it was reported that Lebedev had abandoned plans for investment in Air Botswana.

=== Recent history ===
In December 2008, Air Botswana signed a deal with ATR for two 68-seat ATR 72–500 regional airliners worth US$37 million. The aircraft were delivered in March 2009, and it was announced that routes linking Kasane and Francistown with Johannesburg would be restarted. The aircraft were delivered at the time of Air Botswana facing increased competition from South African Airways which had re-entered the Johannesburg-Gaborone market. In July 2009, Air Botswana signed a codeshare agreement with Kenya Airways, which began flights to Gaborone on 6 September with three flights per week.

The airline left the International Air Transport Association because of its inability to meet the December 2008 deadline of the IATA Operational Safety Audit, but has since been re-admitted as a full member in 2012, under the leadership of the general manager, Sakhile Nyoni-Reiling.

In December 2012, Nyoni-Reiling resigned, and press reports in May 2013 indicated internal conflicts and that two directors had been suspended for gross mismanagement pending investigations.

In late 2015, Tshenolo Mabeo, the minister responsible for transport, sacked the then general manager Ben Dahwa together with his entire board of directors, following allegations of corruption. General Tebogo Carter Masire, former Botswana Defence Force (BDF) Commander, was appointed in February 2016 to lead Air Botswana as board chairman, replacing Nigel Dixon-Warren.

In November 2019, the EastAfrican newspaper reported that Air Botswana was in the process of cutting its staff numbers from 450 to 210 people. The airline has been running at a loss for more than a decade, reportedly due to high maintenance costs for its planes. The plans also include outsourcing ground handling services to a new company, yet to be formed. It is expected that the majority of the retrenched workers will be hired by the new ground handling outfit.

In December 2023, Lulu Rasebotsa was hired to replace Agnes Khunwana who relocated to CEIBA Intercontinental. During the first six months of her tenure, Rasebotsa oversaw the expansion of the company fleet with the introduction of new aircraft and the expansion of the destinations network. The Botswana government pumped in new money to expand the enterprise.

== Corporate affairs ==
=== Ownership ===
Despite various initiatives to privatise the airline, in whole or in part, Air Botswana remains 100 percent owned by the Government of Botswana.

=== Business trends ===
Air Botswana has been consistently loss-making for many years. Although the airline is government owned, full annual reports do not appear to be published. Financial results (for years ending 31 March) are published by the auditor general, and other data in AFRAA reports, as below:

	2008	2009	2010	2011	2012	2013	2014	2015	2016	2017	2018
Turnover (P Million)	202.6	232.5	219.6	246.2	278.6	389.1	406.2*			417.4*	338.8*
*Includes a government grant (amount shown if known)(P Million)							63.4				
Net profit (P Million)	17.5	−87.0	−45.1	−54.2	−47.1	−75.8	−100.0	−165.0	−86.1	−12.4	−42.1
Number of employees	250							567	522	385	414
Number of passengers (000s)						265			254	224	253
Passenger load factor (%)									59	62	69
Number of aircraft (at year end)					9		7	6	6	4	6
Notes/sources											

== Destinations ==
As of March 2026, Air Botswana operated scheduled passenger flights to the following destinations:

Country	City	Airport	Notes	Refs
Botswana	Francistown	Phillip Gaonwe Matante International Airport		
Botswana	Gaborone	Sir Seretse Khama International Airport	Hub	
Botswana	Kasane	Kasane Airport		
Botswana	Maun	Maun Airport		
South Africa	Cape Town	Cape Town International Airport		
South Africa	Johannesburg	O. R. Tambo International Airport		
Zambia	Lusaka	Kenneth Kaunda International Airport		
Zimbabwe	Harare	Robert Gabriel Mugabe International Airport		

=== Codeshare agreement ===
Air Botswana has codeshares with the following airlines:

- Air Seychelles
- Qatar Airways

=== Interline agreements ===
Air Botswana also has Interline agreements with Emirates.

== Fleet ==
=== Current fleet ===
As of March 2026, the Air Botswana fleet consists of the following aircraft:

Air Botswana fleet
Aircraft	In service	Orders	Passengers			Notes
Aircraft	In service	Orders	C	Y	Total	Notes
ATR 72-600	2	—	—	70	70	
Embraer 175	1	—	—	70	70	
Total	3	—				

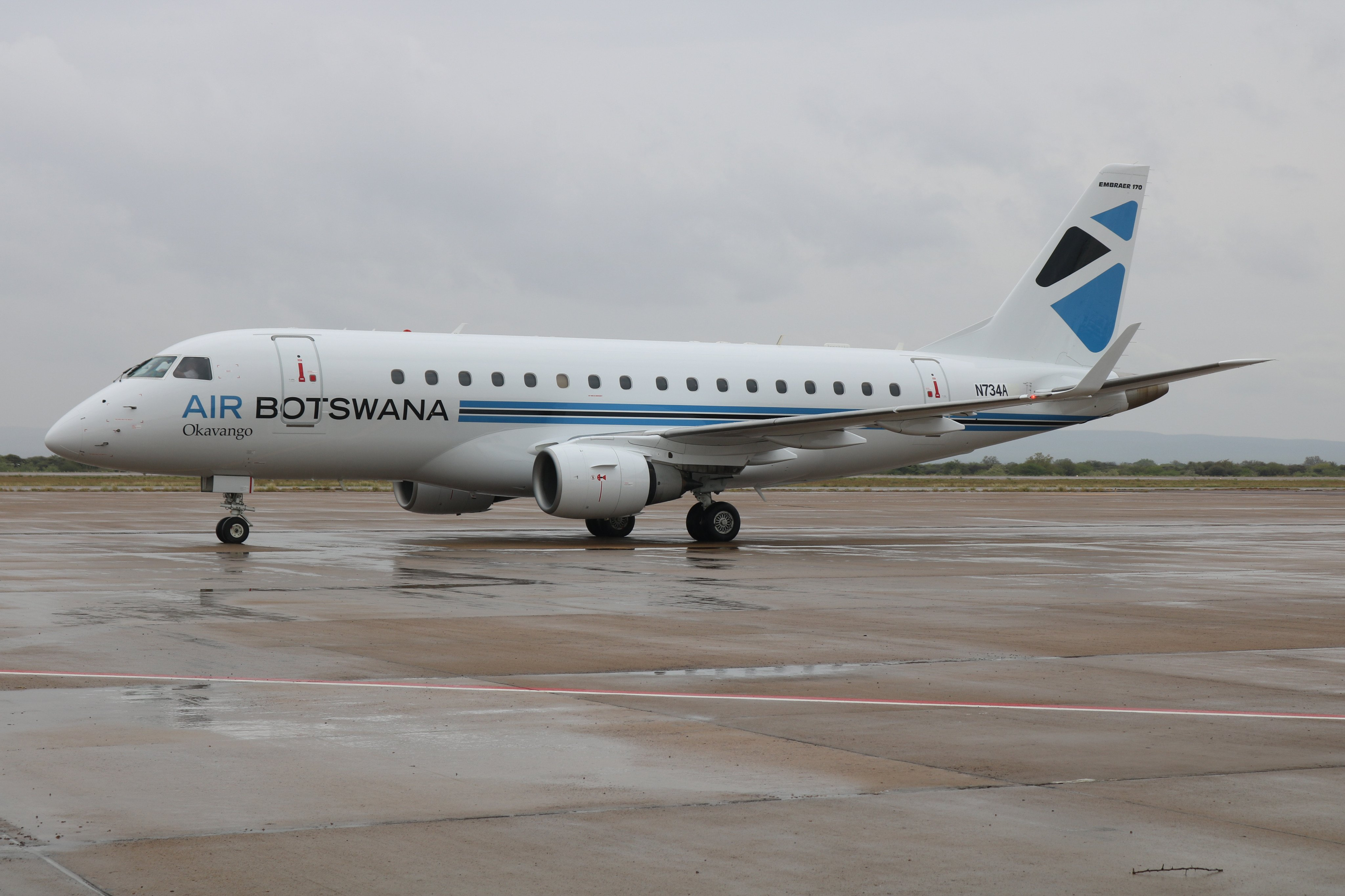
Air Botswana Embraer 175.

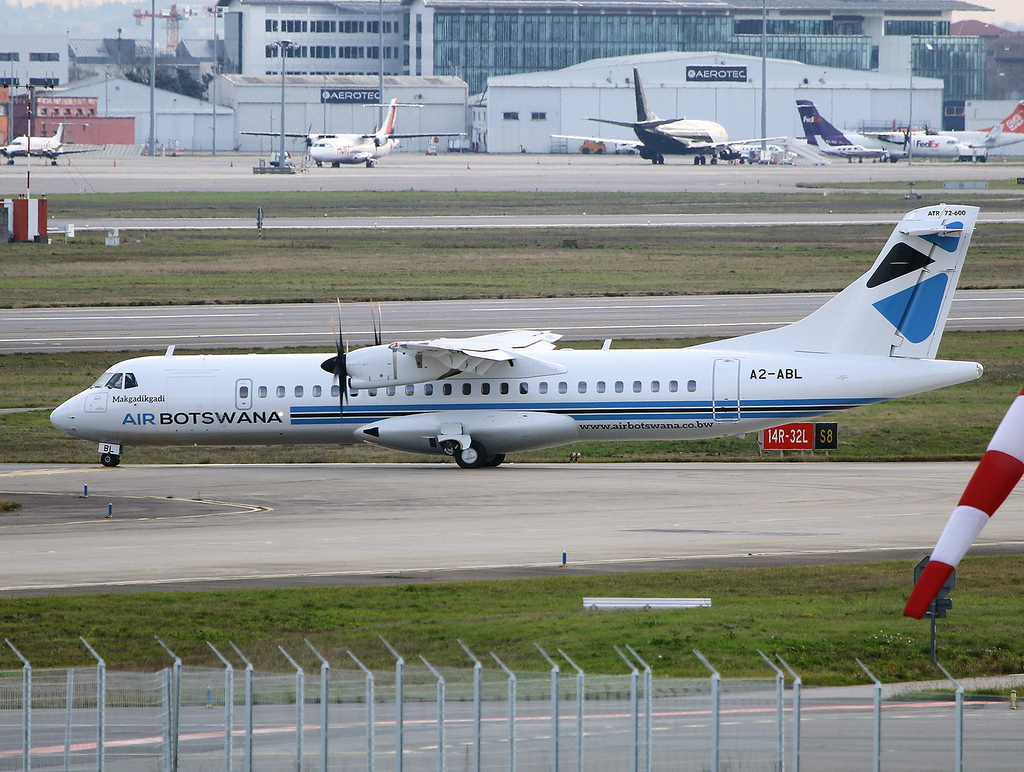
Air Botswana ATR 72.

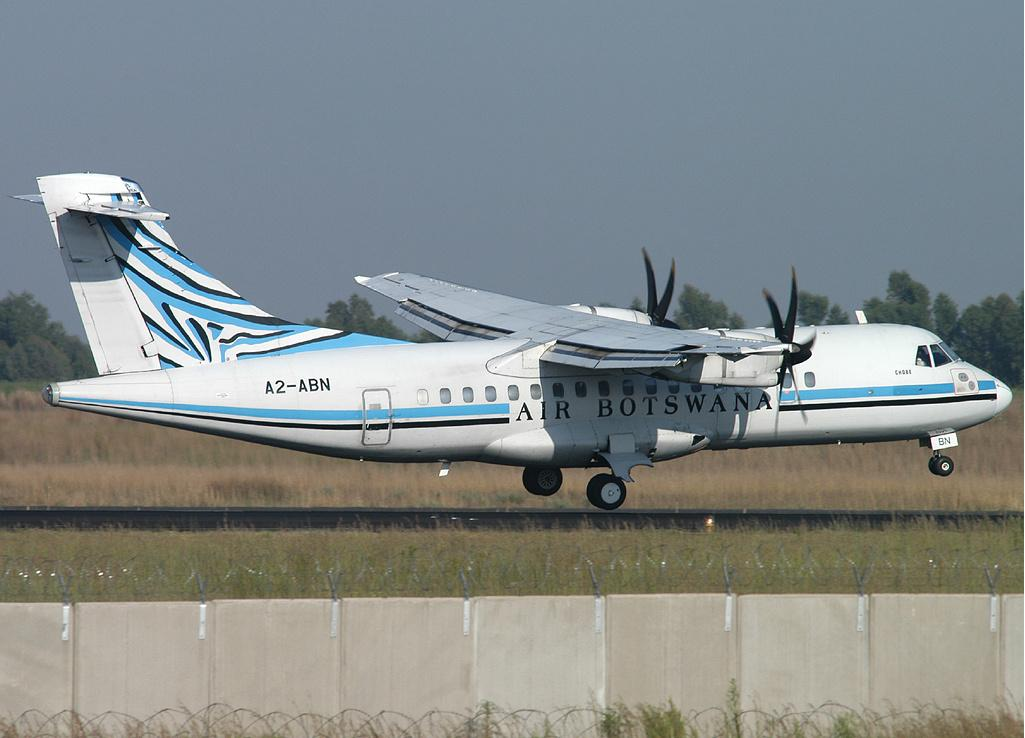
Air Botswana ATR 42.

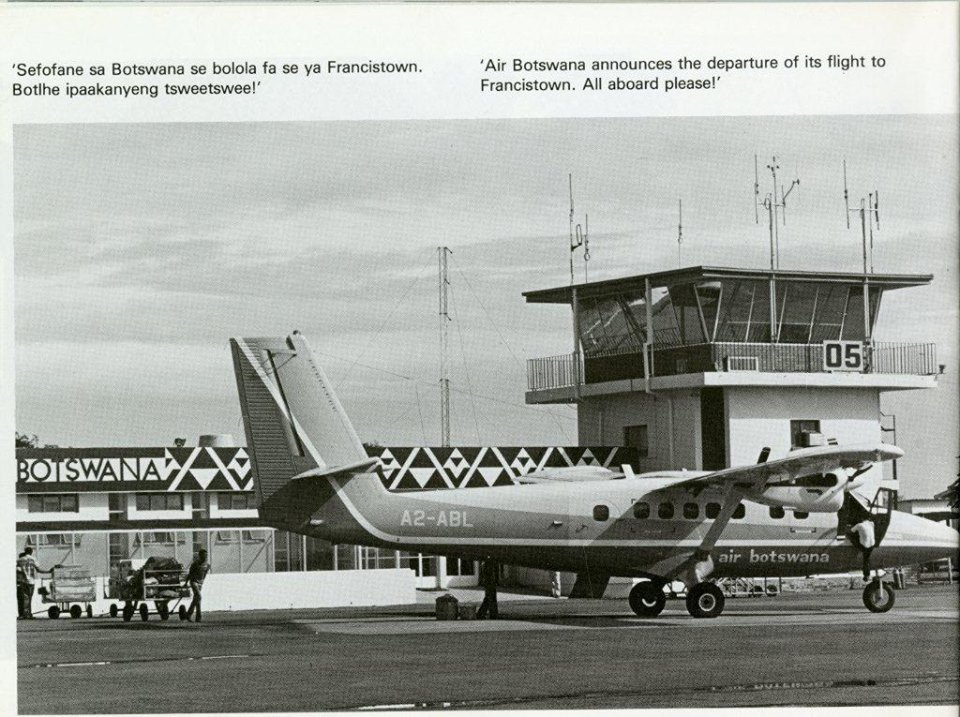
Air Botswana BNB 6382, pictured in 1981

== See also ==
- Airlink
- Air Botswana Employees' Union
