= John Gibson (RAF officer) =

New Zealand RAF officer (1916–2000)

John Albert Axel Gibson
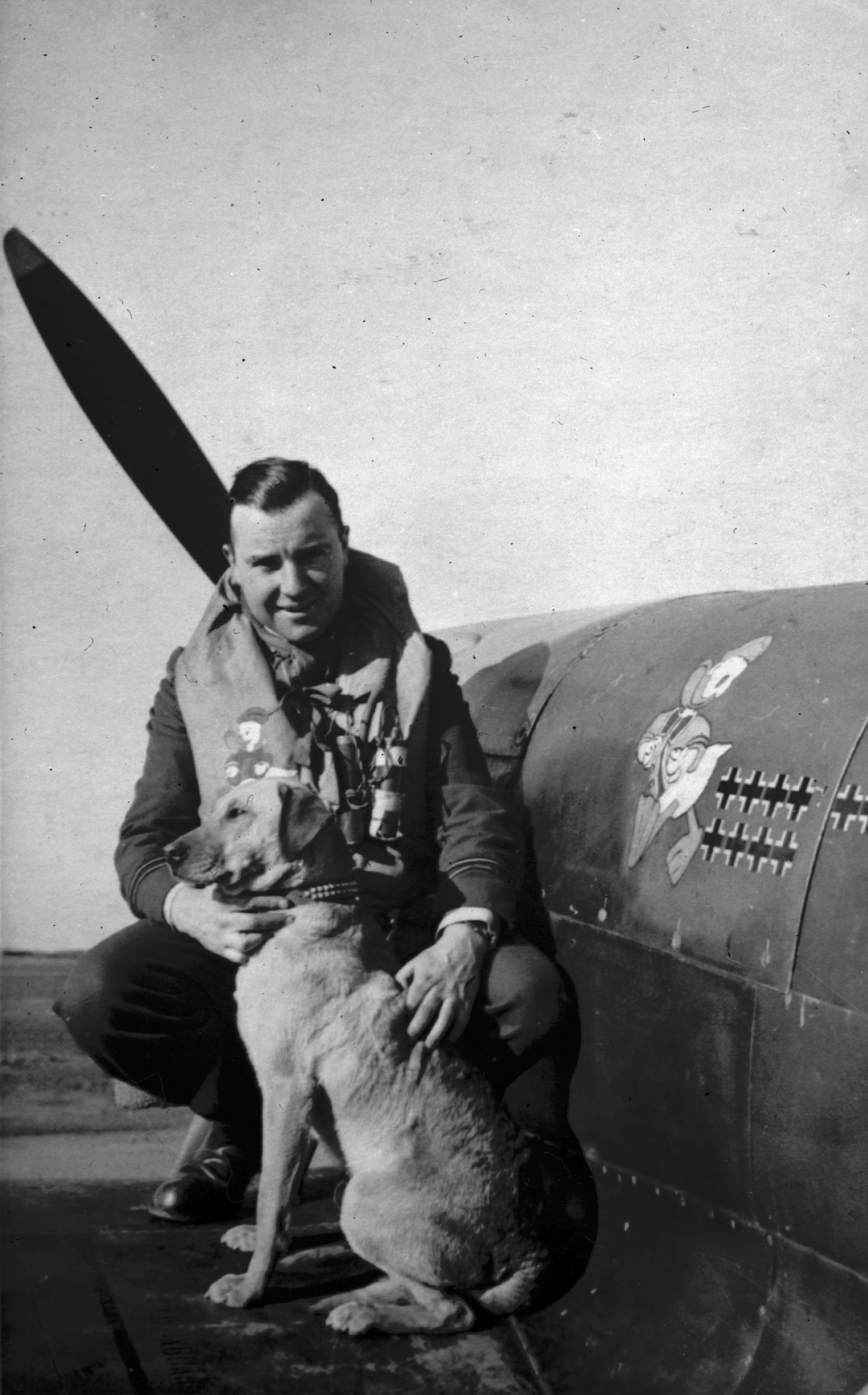
- Flight Lieutenant John Gibson, on the wing of his Spitfire, early 1942
- Born: Axel John Albert von Wichmann; 24 August 1916; Brighton, England
- Died: 1 July 2000 (aged 83); Nottingham, England
- Military career
- Allegiance: United Kingdom
- Branch: Royal Air Force
- Rank: Squadron Leader
- Commands: No. 15 Squadron RNZAF
- Conflicts: Second World War; Battle of France; Battle of Britain; Bougainville campaign
- Awards: Distinguished Service Order; Distinguished Flying Cross
- Other work: Airline pilot and executive

John Albert Axel Gibson, DSO, DFC (24 August 1916 – 1 July 2000) was a British Royal Air Force (RAF) officer and a flying ace of the Second World War. He was credited with the destruction of at least 13 enemy aircraft.

Born in Brighton, Gibson moved to New Zealand in 1920 with his mother after his parents divorced. In 1938, he went to England having been accepted for service with the RAF. He flew with No. 501 (County of Gloucester) Squadron during the Battle of France and the subsequent Battle of Britain. Awarded the Distinguished Flying Cross in late August 1940, he spent much of 1941 as an instructor before briefly serving with No. 457 Squadron. In mid-1942, he was loaned to the Royal New Zealand Air Force (RNZAF) and served with its No. 15 Squadron, including a period as its commander, during the Solomon Islands campaign in the Pacific. He was later awarded the Distinguished Service Order for his service with the squadron. He returned to Europe in 1945, serving with No. 80 Squadron. After the war, he transferred to the RNZAF but then rejoined the RAF. He retired from the military in late 1954. In his later years, he was involved in civil aviation in South Africa and Rhodesia, and also flew during the Biafran War and the Rhodesian Bush War. He retired to England, where he died aged 83.

== Early life ==
John Gibson was born Axel John Albert von Wichmann in Brighton, in the United Kingdom, on 24 August 1916, the only child of Violet Lilian née Wells and Axel Charles von Wichmann. Gibson's parents divorced and he went to New Zealand with his mother and her family in 1920. His mother married James Gibson while his father, still in England, later anglicised his family name to Wickman and started the Coventry machine tool manufacturer A.C. Wickman, of Brighton and Hove. Gibson was educated at various schools in Auckland, including Auckland Grammar School, before going on to attend New Plymouth Boys' High School. A good sportsman, he was the school champion in rifle shooting.

== Royal Air Force ==
In 1937, Gibson applied to the Royal Air Force (RAF) for a short-service commission. When he was provisionally accepted, he went to the United Kingdom, departing New Zealand on 7 April 1938 aboard the RMS Rangitata. Just before he left the country, he changed his name by deed poll to John Albert Axel Gibson. He commenced an elementary flying course at Brough Aerodrome, learning to fly on Blackburn B-2 trainer aircraft. Passing the course, he was commissioned as an acting pilot officer on probation on 9 July and went to Uxbridge for formal induction into the RAF.

Gibson proceeded onto No. 3 Flight Training School at South Cerney, flying Hawker Harts and Audaxes trainers and gaining his wings in November. His commission confirmed on 16 August 1939, he became an army cooperation pilot, flying from Farnborough.

== Second World War ==
In May 1940, as France was invaded by Nazi Germany, Gibson was posted to No. 501 (County of Gloucester) Squadron. His squadron was dispatched from RAF Tangmere across the English Channel to Bétheniville, as reinforcements for the Advanced Air Striking Force. At the time he joined the squadron, it flew Hawker Hurricane fighters, a type which Gibson had not flown before. He was quick to adapt and was involved in a number of actions as the squadron operated in support of the Allied forces as they retreated before the advancing Germans. On 27 May, the squadron encountered 30 Heinkel He 111 medium bombers; Gibson destroyed one and shared in the destruction of another. He himself was then shot down, and crash landed close to Rouen. Unhurt, he was soon back in action. In the following days, he shot down another He 111 and was credited with the probable destruction of two more bombers, plus damaging another three. He was again shot down on 10 June over Le Mans, but not before destroying a Messerschmitt Bf 109 fighter. A week later his squadron withdrew to Jersey, from where it covered the evacuation of the British Expeditionary Force from Cherbourg.

=== Battle of Britain ===
Having claimed 45 German aircraft destroyed during its service in France, No. 501 Squadron regrouped at Croydon Airport on 21 June, where it received replacement pilots. From 4 July, it performed convoy patrols off the Isle of Portland, flying from Warmwell. He damaged a He 111 on 9 July, flying over Portland, and a few days later destroyed a Dornier Do 17 medium bomber; the identification of the bomber was suspect, and it may have been a Messerschmitt Bf 110 heavy fighter.

Later in the month, Gibson's squadron moved to Gravesend in Kent, carrying out patrols and intercepting incoming German raids. He shot down a Junkers Ju 87 divebomber over Dover on 29 July, one of a group of Ju 87s being escorted by Bf 109s. He also damaged another Ju 87 in the encounter. During a raid on a convoy near Deal on 12 August, Gibson claimed a Ju 87 as destroyed, observing its pilot bailing out after his attack. He was also credited with the destruction of an escorting Bf 109. Returning to his airfield, he crashed his Hurricane on landing, running it into a crater resulting from a bombing raid. Three days later, leading a section of three Hurricanes that encountered 20 Ju 87s, he destroyed one of the divebombers, seeing it crash into the sea. In the meantime, the airfield at Hawkinge, from which the squadron was operating at the time, was being attacked by more Ju 87s. Gibson and his section returned to deal with the attack, and he damaged one of the Ju 87s. His own aircraft was damaged and set on fire in the encounter; being over the populated area of Folkestone, he stayed with the Hurricane until it was clear of the town before he bailed out.

In another bombing raid mounted by the Luftwaffe, on 24 August over 50 Junkers Ju 88 bombers were intercepted by No. 501 Squadron over Ramsgate. Gibson destroyed one of the Ju 88s, seeing it crash into the sea off Margate. He was promoted to acting flight lieutenant the next day. In the evening of 29 August, he shot down a Bf 109 but was then shot down himself. He parachuted into the English Channel and was rescued by a launch. The next day he was awarded the Distinguished Flying Cross for his exploits of 15 August. The published citation read:

In August, whilst on an offensive patrol over Dover this officer engaged and destroyed a Junkers 87 and was afterwards shot down himself. Although his aircraft was in flames he steered it away from the town of Folkestone and did not abandon the aircraft until it had descended to 1,000 feet. Pilot Officer Gibson has destroyed eight enemy aircraft, and has displayed great courage and presence of mind.

— London Gazette, No. 34935, 30 August 1940

Gibson's flying officer rank was made substantive in early September and a few days later, on 7 September, the Luftwaffe mounted its first large scale bombing attack on London. Ten RAF squadrons, No. 501 among them, were scrambled to intercept. Over 100 enemy aircraft were engaged by the RAF; Gibson claimed a probable. Later in the month, and now operating from Kenley, he claimed a Bf 109 and a Do 17 as damaged. He himself was wounded in one encounter and hospitalised. Over the next few months, Luftwaffe activity gradually decreased and in December, No. 501 Squadron returned to Filton.

For the first few months of 1941, the squadron converted to Supermarine Spitfire fighters and began preparing for offensive operations. However, in late May, Gibson, needing a rest, was posted to No. 53 Operational Training Unit, at Heston as an instructor. Later in the year, his acting rank of flight lieutenant was made substantive. In late 1941, he returned to operational flying as a flight commander with No. 457 Squadron, an Australian Spitfire squadron based on the Isle of Man. Until March 1942, the squadron was engaged in convoy patrols over the Irish Sea until it switched to offensive operations, flying sweeps from Redhill to occupied France. At the end of May, the squadron was taken off operations in anticipation of a move to Australia.

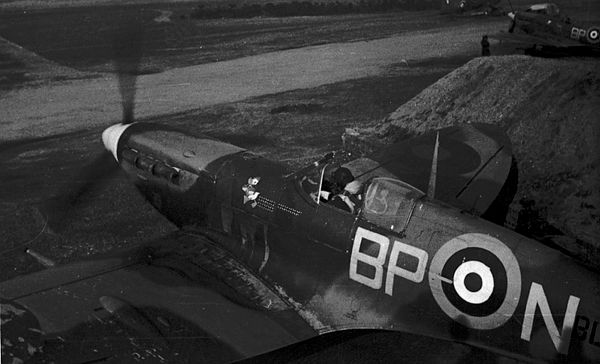
John Gibson sitting in the cockpit of his Spitfire while in its revetment, early 1942

=== Service in the Pacific ===
In June, Gibson was sent to New Zealand to serve with the Royal New Zealand Air Force (RNZAF) on loan. He joined the newly formed No. 15 Squadron, which was at the time based at Whenuapai, as a flight commander. The squadron lacked aircraft, its intended P-40 Kittyhawk fighters having been sent to Allied units in the Middle East, which took priority for the equipment. Despite its lack of aircraft, the squadron went to Tonga at the end of October, taking over the Kittyhawks of the American 68th Pursuit Squadron. In addition to its aircrew undergoing operational training, the initial duties of the squadron was responsibility for the defence of Tonga. There were no engagements with the enemy before Gibson returned to New Zealand at the end of the year to take up a staff position at Air Headquarters, Control Group.

In May 1943, Gibson, just promoted to acting squadron leader, attended a course at the Army Staff College at Linton Military Camp before resuming staff duties. In December, he rejoined No. 15 Squadron, at the time based on New Georgia in the Solomon Islands. He took over as its commander from Squadron Leader Michael Herrick. At the start of 1944, the squadron covered the landings at Bougainville, before commencing operations from the island itself. He destroyed a Zeke, a variant of the Mitsubishi A6M Zero fighter, on 23 January during a mission escorting Grumman TBF Avenger dive bombers over Rabaul. The next month, the squadron went to New Zealand for a rest. It returned to the South Pacific for another operational tour, flying first from Guadalcanal and then Bougainville. In August, Gibson's secondment to the RNZAF ended and he returned to Europe soon afterwards. His rank of squadron leader had been confirmed the previous month.

=== Return to Europe ===
On arrival back in the United Kingdom, Gibson was posted to No. 80 Squadron, which operated the Hawker Tempest fighter. At the time, the squadron was part of the 2nd Tactical Air Force and was based at Volkel, in the Netherlands. It flew operations attacking ground targets of opportunity; transport, bridges and trains. On 16 March 1945 he was awarded the Distinguished Service Order in recognition of his "gallantry and devotion to duty in the execution of air operations in the South-West Pacific area". By this time, he had flown 382 sorties and accumulated over 660 hours of flying on operations.

During Operation Varsity, which took place on 24 March, No. 80 Squadron flew in support of the gliders carrying airborne forces as part of the 21st Army Group's crossing of Rhine. Leading a group of Tempests targeting German transport, Gibson's aircraft was damaged by flak and he had to make a forced landing. Injured in the landing, he had to receive medical treatment in England, ending his active service in the war.

Gibson was credited with twelve enemy aircraft destroyed, one shared destroyed, two unconfirmed destroyed, one probably destroyed and eleven damaged.

== Postwar period ==
His short service commission completed, Gibson relinquished his rank of acting squadron leader and formally transferred to the RNZAF on 1 December 1945. However, in late 1946 he returned to the RAF, reverting to his substantive rank of flight lieutenant, with his commission extended for four years. He served as Field Marshal Bernard Montgomery's pilot and then from late 1947, was aide and pilot to Marshal of the Royal Air Force Arthur Tedder for an 18-month period. He gained a permanent commission in the RAF in 1951, again in the rank of flight lieutenant. He was promoted to squadron leader again on 1 January 1953. He finally retired from the RAF on 31 December 1954.

== Later life ==
Gibson settled in South Africa with his wife Isobel née Sharpe; she was his second wife. A wartime marriage, to Ethel Formby, the sister of George Formby, had been dissolved. There was a son from that relationship. He flew commercial aircraft for the Chamber of Mines, based in Johannesburg. In 1965, Gibson formed Bechuanaland National Airways, which operated the Douglas DC-3 and Douglas DC-4. During the Biafran War of 1969–70, Gibson flew for the Rhodesian Air Services airline, which was run by his friend Jack Malloch. Operating from an airstrip that was in fact a widened road, and with his son Michael as co-pilot, he flew in supplies and helped to evacuate refugee children. All the flights were made at night, often with few navigation aids.

He later formed a charter airline Jagair, based at Kariba Dam in Rhodesia. The company, a portmanteau based on Gibson's initials, operated a Cessna 310. He ended his involvement with his airline venture in 1974, but then flew with the Rhodesian Air Force until the end of the Rhodesian Bush War in 1979. He lived in Salisbury, Zimbabwe, working as the operations manager for the Department of Civil Aviation until 1987, when he retired and returned to the United Kingdom. He settled in Nottingham. He died on 1 July 2000 at the age of 83.
