= Kasane Airport =

Airport in Chobe District, Botswana

Kasane International Airport
- New Kasane Airport, opened July 2019
- IATA: BBK; ICAO: FBKE

Summary
- Airport type: Public
- Operator: Civil Aviation Authority of Botswana
- Serves: Kasane, Botswana
- Elevation AMSL: 3,290 ft (1,000 m)
- Coordinates: 17°49′55″S 25°9′50″E

Map
- Location of the airport in Botswana

Runways
Direction	Length		Surface
Direction	m	ft	Surface
08/26	3,000	9,843	Asphalt

Kasane International Airport (IATA: BBK, ICAO: FBKE) is an airport serving Kasane, a town in the Chobe District of Botswana. The airport is located along the A33 road, 4 kilometres (2.5 mi) south of the town and 4 kilometres (2.5 mi) south of the border with Namibia.

Air Botswana provides scheduled service between Kasane and Gaborone on Tuesdays, Fridays, and Sundays. Numerous charter flight operators offer flights to other destinations in the vicinity.

Because it is near Chobe National Park, the airport is mainly used for tourism. Most lodges in the Kasane area provide shuttles from and to the airport. A bus shuttle is available for travel to Victoria Falls in Zambia and Zimbabwe.

== History ==
Since the 1960s, the Chobe region was served by an earlier airport, Kasane Airfield. In 1989, constructing for its replacement had commenced, and it was completed in 1990. Seven houses outside the airport were built to accommodate airport staff, and 65 houses were built in the new plateau area by Botswana Housing Corporation to house staff for customs, immigration, and police. Kasane International Airport opened afterwards, and the old airport was closed and redeveloped into a golf course. On 1 August 1991, Kasane Airport and Ngoma Border Post was formally designated as a point of entry. The airport comprised two operational phases, the first of which covering a period of five to ten years. The first phase aimed at keeping the airport suitable to accommodation present aircraft of Air Botswana, such as the ATR 42 turboprop. During the Eighth National Development Plan in 1991-2003, the runway was extended from 2,000 metres to 3,000 to accommodate Boeing 737 aircraft.

The present 7,800-square-metre (84,000 sq ft) terminal was opened on 22 February 2018. It replaced the original 1,300-square-metre (14,000 sq ft) terminal building which opened in 1991.

The Kasane VOR station and ADF system are situated at the airport.

== Airlines and destinations ==
Airlines	Destinations
Air Botswana	Cape Town, Gaborone, Johannesburg–O. R. Tambo, Maun, Mbombela, Windhoek–Hosea Kutako
Airlink	Johannesburg–O. R. Tambo

== Charter operators ==
- Wilderness Air – Windhoek to Kasane
- Moremi Air Services
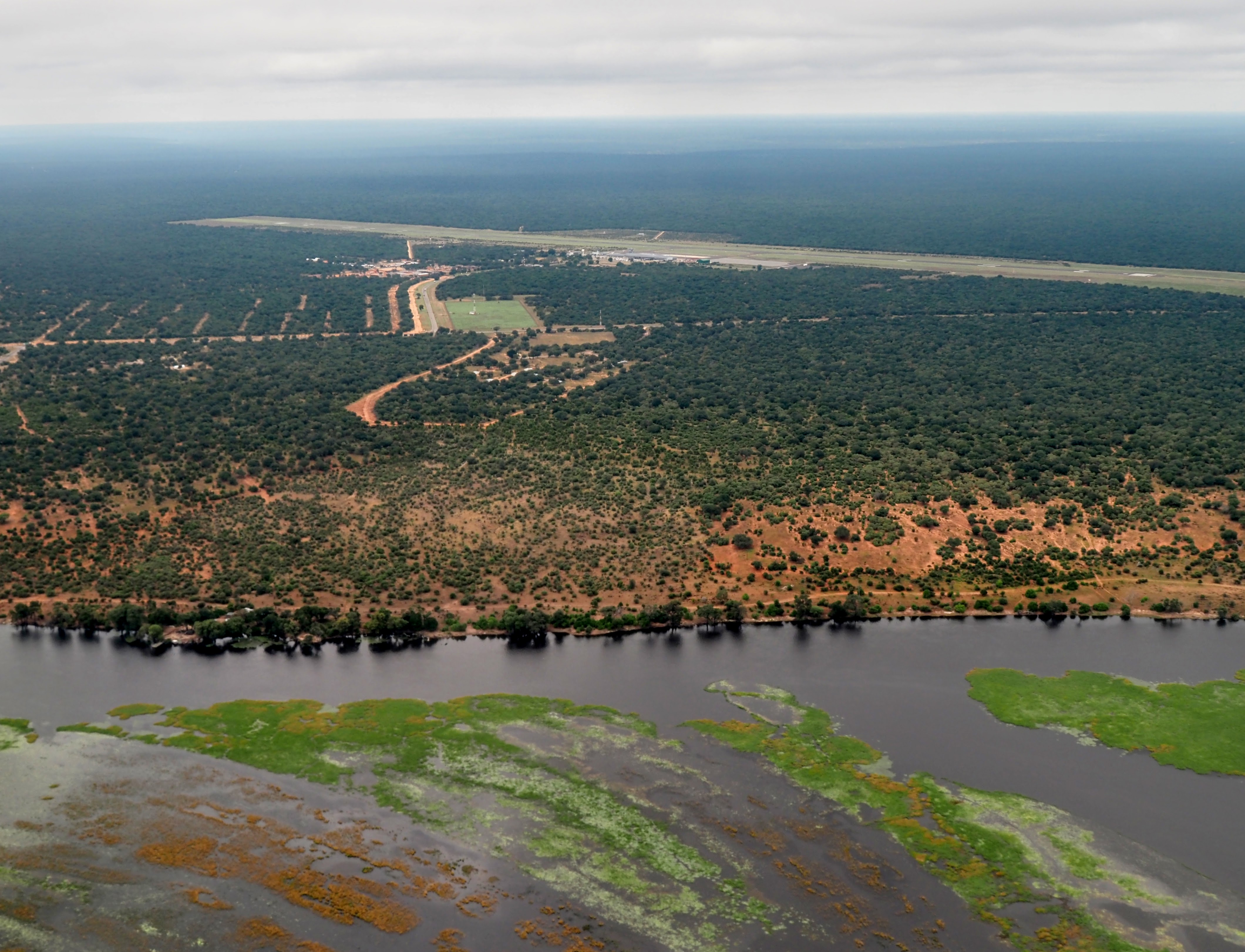
Aerial view on flight in from Livingstone, Zambia, with Chobe River

Apron and terminal building

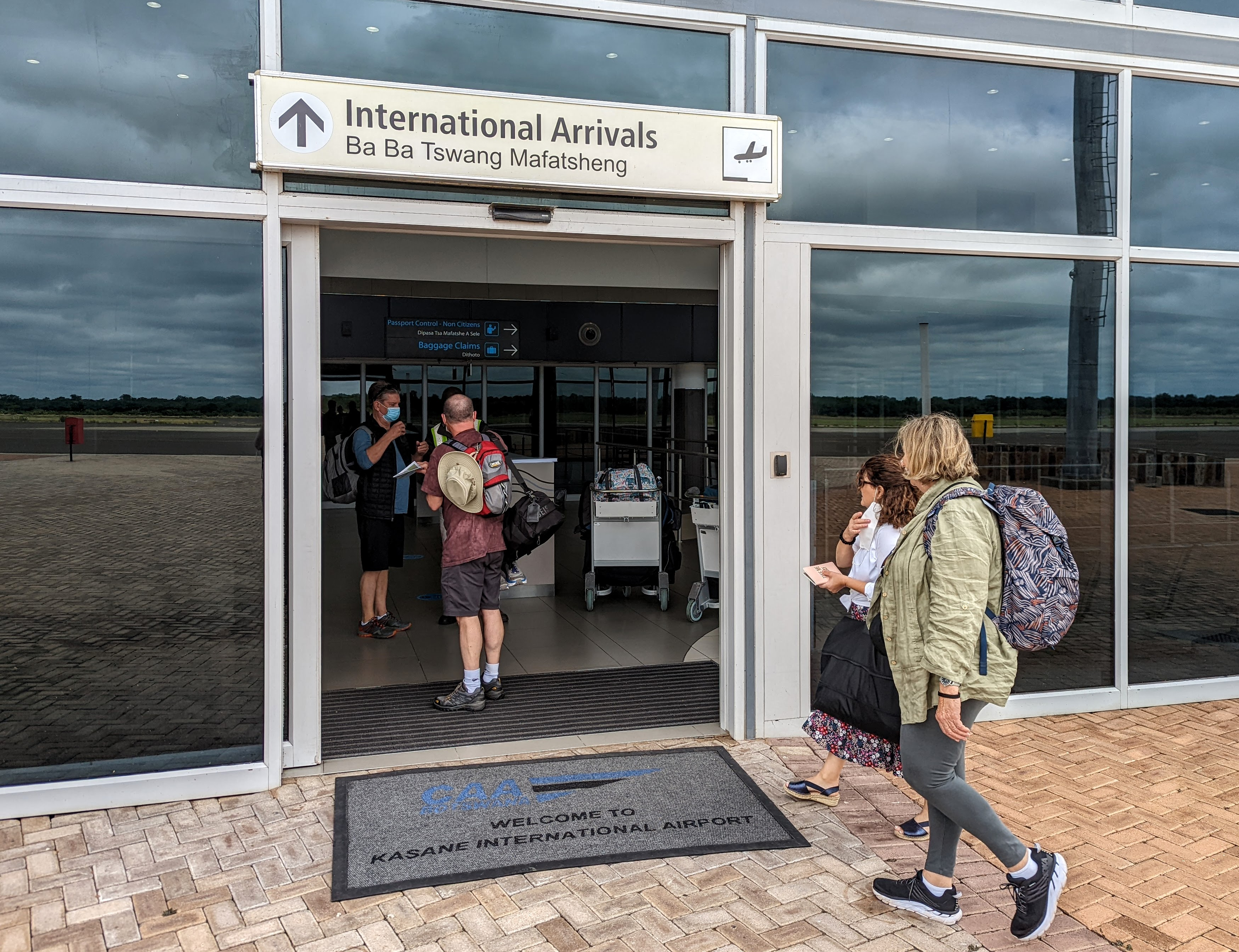
International passengers arriving at terminal

== See also ==
- Transport in Botswana
- List of airports in Botswana
