= Kasane Airfield =

Former airport in Kasane, Botswana

- IATA: none; ICAO: ~~FBKE~~

Summary
- Airport type: Defunct
- Location: Kasane, Botswana
- Closed: 1990
- Coordinates: 17°47′19″S 25°09′39″E

Map
- Location in Botswana

Runways
| Direction | Length | | Surface |
| Direction | ft | m | Surface |
|---|---|---|---|
| 5/23 | 3,280 | 1,000 | Gravelled |

Kasane Airfield (ICAO: ~~FBKE~~) was an airport that served Kasane in the Chobe District of Botswana. It was established sometime in the late 1950s to 1961, and served as an intermediate stop for clandestine anti-apartheid operations. In the late 1960s, the airport began supporting the district's increasing tourism industry. Being restricted and lacking a paved runway, it closed in 1990 following the completion of its replacement, Kasane Airport.

== History ==
Throughout the 1950s, the only landing ground in the Chobe District were at Chobe Concession and Pandamatenga. Radio communication at Kasane at the time, was still under consideration. In 1961, the newly established Bechuanaland Air Safaris commenced a service at Kasane Airfield as a connecting flight, connecting it to Mbeya and Dar es Salaam in Tanzania. The route, beginning at Lobatse and ending at Dar es Salaam was used to support clandestine movements of anti-apartheid activists through Bechuanaland. In the route, the airfield primarily served as an intermediate stop for refuelling aircraft. After arriving overnight, fuel would be obtained in Victoria Falls, South Rhodesia (now Zimbabwe). Notably, Nelson Mandela and his companions flew via Kasane before continuing southwards.

=== Tourism ===
Tourism in Chobe only began to rise in the late 1960s. In Air Navigation (Airfield Charges) Order, 1973, Kasane Airfield was officially designated as a Class C airfield. This year, a customs control post was established at the northwest end of the runway. The airport did not contain a conventional terminal, and the post only managed arriving and departing passengers, and the examination of passengers and baggage. It did not have a closing and opening time.

Throughout the 1970s and 1980s, Kasane Airfield was increasingly tied to the tourism industry in Chobe. Tourists travelled around the region by private charter from the airfield, though all flights had to be security checked and registered prior to arriving. Visitors would also travel from Victoria Falls to Kasane, where they transferred into light aircraft for flights to remote safari airstrips. It also supported the local village as all supplies would come from Victoria Falls by air, as there was no main road to Francistown other than Bushman Pits Road—a three-day trip using four-wheel drive. There was only a ground-to-air radio for contacting incoming aircraft. Beginning in 1983 Kasane Enterprise—a local office agency owned by Carr-Hartley—held meet and greets at the airfield for travellers and managed the refuelling of aircraft. Fuel was provided by the filling station at the Safari Lodge, which was serviced by Francistown-based BGI Agencies, owned by Peter Becker.

To mitigate the risk of an unserviceable runway caused by rain, the runway was gravelled in 1977, and a layer of bitumen was also added. In 1981, further improvements for Kasane Airfield were assigned at low priority, and that the possibility of carrying out runway work had been postponed. By 1984, there were 1,300 aircraft movements per year. Landing at Kasane Airfield involved arriving steeply over the river on final approach, avoiding a power line and then touching down quickly to use the full runway length. If an aircraft overran the runway, it was possible for it to run into the Chobe River's rapids.

=== Closure ===
By the late 1980s, Chobe district became more economically viable as it attracted more tourists worldwide. By then, the current airport was under-equipped, constrained in a small area, and lacked permanent facilities like a terminal. Additionally, the short runway would often get unusable following rain, and multiple recent accidents prompted the development of a replacement airport. In 1989, construction of the new Kasane Airport commenced. The new airport was opened in 1990, and Kasane Airfield closed thereafter. Following closure, Kasane Enterprise was no longer tasked with having to refuel aircraft. The land made available by demolishing the former airfield was able to produce high and medium cost housing. However, it instead became the Mowana Lodge Golf Course.

== Facilities ==
Kasane Airfield was equipped with one gravelled runway, measuring 3,280 feet (1,000 metres) long and designated 5/23. The runway surface was reported to be of good quality. Perimeter fencing was added to the airfield by the late 1980s. The airstrip had no permanent facilities, and the area west of it was undeveloped.

== Accidents & incidents ==
- 1980s - A Cessna approached Kasane Airfield too high, landing on the runway late. With a possibility that the aircraft was going to overrun the runway and career into the rapids, the pilot turned to the side into the bush. The Cessna was totalled and the pilot survived, reportedly quitting after the incident.
- 1989 - A Piper Cherokee crashed at the airfield, killing all six occupants, including the pilot. This was the first accident in which the Investigator-in-Charge was a Botswana national.
