= Bechuanaland National Airways =

Southern African airline

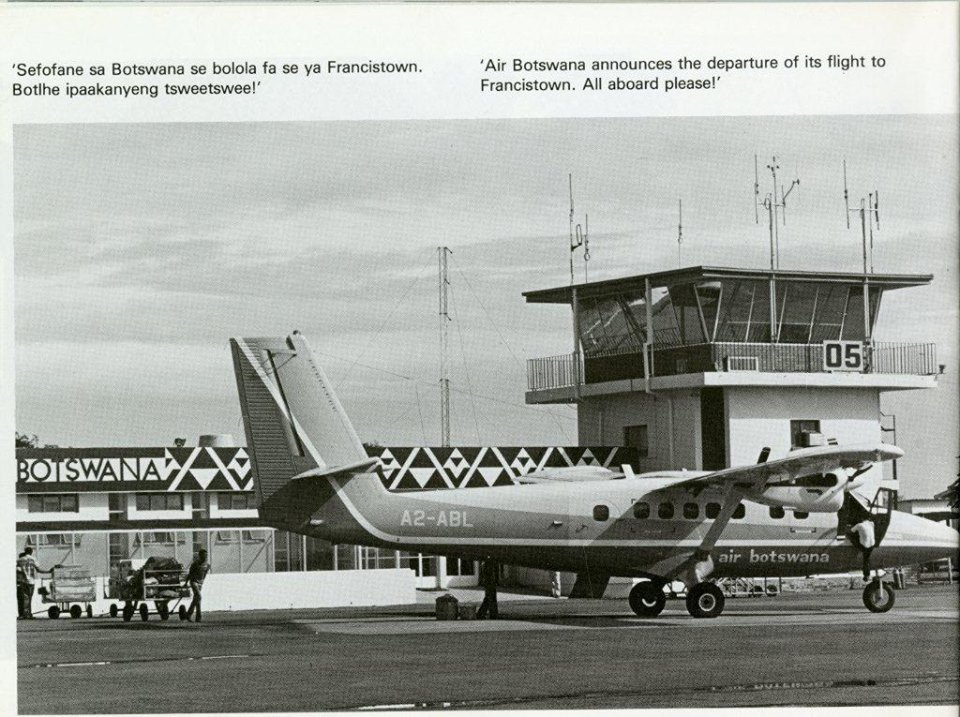
IATA	ICAO	Call sign
FRW	FBFT	—
- Founded: October 1, 1965; 60 years ago
- Commenced operations: November 15, 1965; 60 years ago
- Ceased operations: 1966; 60 years ago
- Operating bases: Francistown Airport
- Key people: Johnny Gibson, Founder

Bechuanaland National Airways was a short-lived national airline of the Bechuanaland Protectorate and was based in Francistown.

== History ==
The airline was formed on 1 October 1965 by Johnny Gibson with a government grant, and took over the route network of privately owned Bechuanaland Safaris. Assistance from British airline Autair International Airways was given, seeing Autair providing Bechuanaland National Airways with its first two aircraft, Douglas DC-3s. The airline was also technically supported by Air Trans Africa.

Operations of the airline commenced on 15 November 1965, and the airline immediately began the development of a large domestic air network from Francistown to seven cities. Internationally, the airline operated on routes linking Francistown to Bulawayo in Rhodesia and Livingstone in Zambia, and Lobatse to Johannesburg.

The airline's route network saw it flying Bulawayo–Francistown–Serowe–Gaborone–Johannesburg–Gaborone–Lobatse–Ghanzi on Mondays; Ghanzi–Lobatse–Gaborone–Serowe–Francistown on Tuesdays; Francistown–Maun–Serondellas–Livingstone–Serondellas–Maun–Francistown on Wednesdays; Francistown–Maun–Ghanzi–Maun–Francistown on Thursdays; Francistown–Serowe–Gaborone–Lobatse–Johannesburg–Lobatse–Gaborone–Serowe–Francistown on Fridays; and Francistown to Bulawayo on Saturdays.

Francistown–Johannesburg and Francistown–Johannesburg–Francistown flights were commenced in early 1966 on Mondays and Fridays respectively. The airline ceased operations late in 1966 and entered receivership. Operations of Bechuanaland National Airways were taken over by Botswana National Airways at the end of 1966, which Gibson was also involved in setting up.
