= 1999 Air Botswana ATR 42 crash =

1999 aviation incident in Botswana

1999 Air Botswana accident
Occurrence
- Date: 11 October 1999
- Summary: Aircraft theft and suicide by pilot
- Site: Sir Seretse Khama International Airport, Gaborone, Botswana; 24.557°S 25.922°E

First aircraft
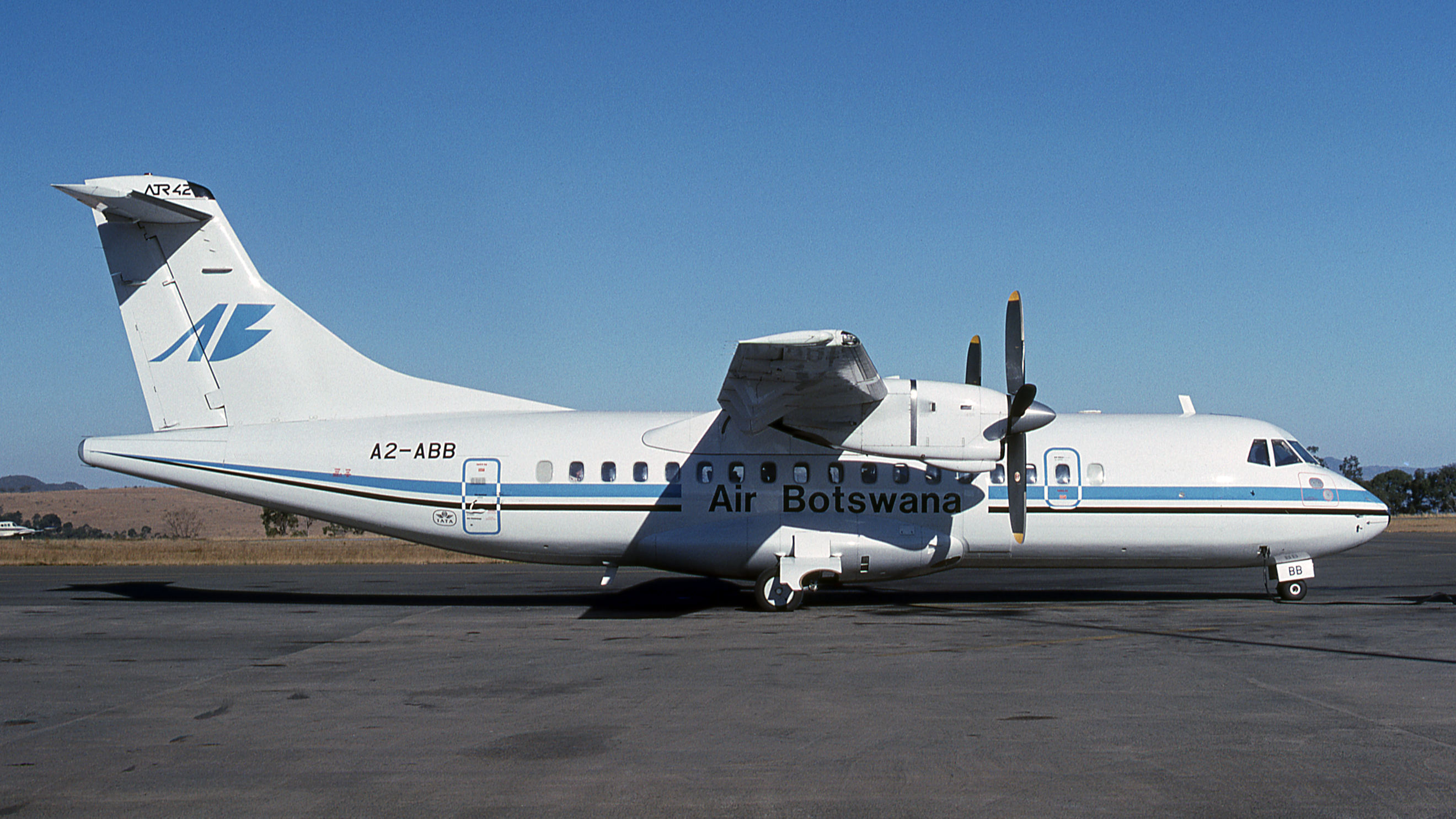
- A2-ABB, the first ATR 42 involved in the accident, photographed in 1989
- Type: ATR 42-320
- Operator: Air Botswana
- Registration: A2-ABB
- Flight origin: Sir Seretse Khama International Airport, Gaborone, Botswana
- Destination: Sir Seretse Khama International Airport, Gaborone, Botswana
- Crew: 1
- Fatalities: 1
- Survivors: 0

Second aircraft
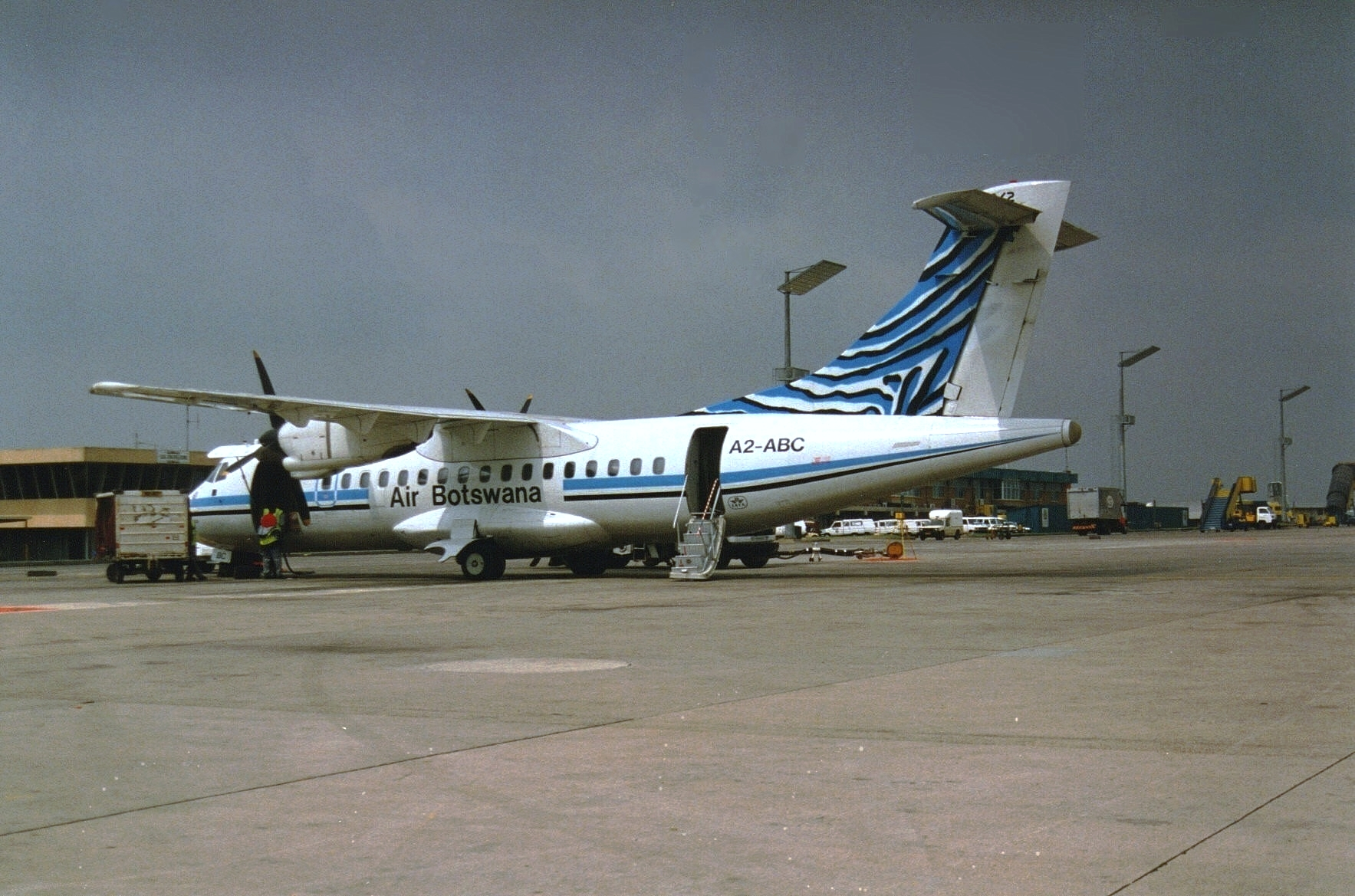
- A2-ABC, the second ATR 42 involved in the accident, photographed in March 1999
- Type: ATR 42-320
- Operator: Air Botswana
- Registration: A2-ABC
- Occupants: 0

Third aircraft
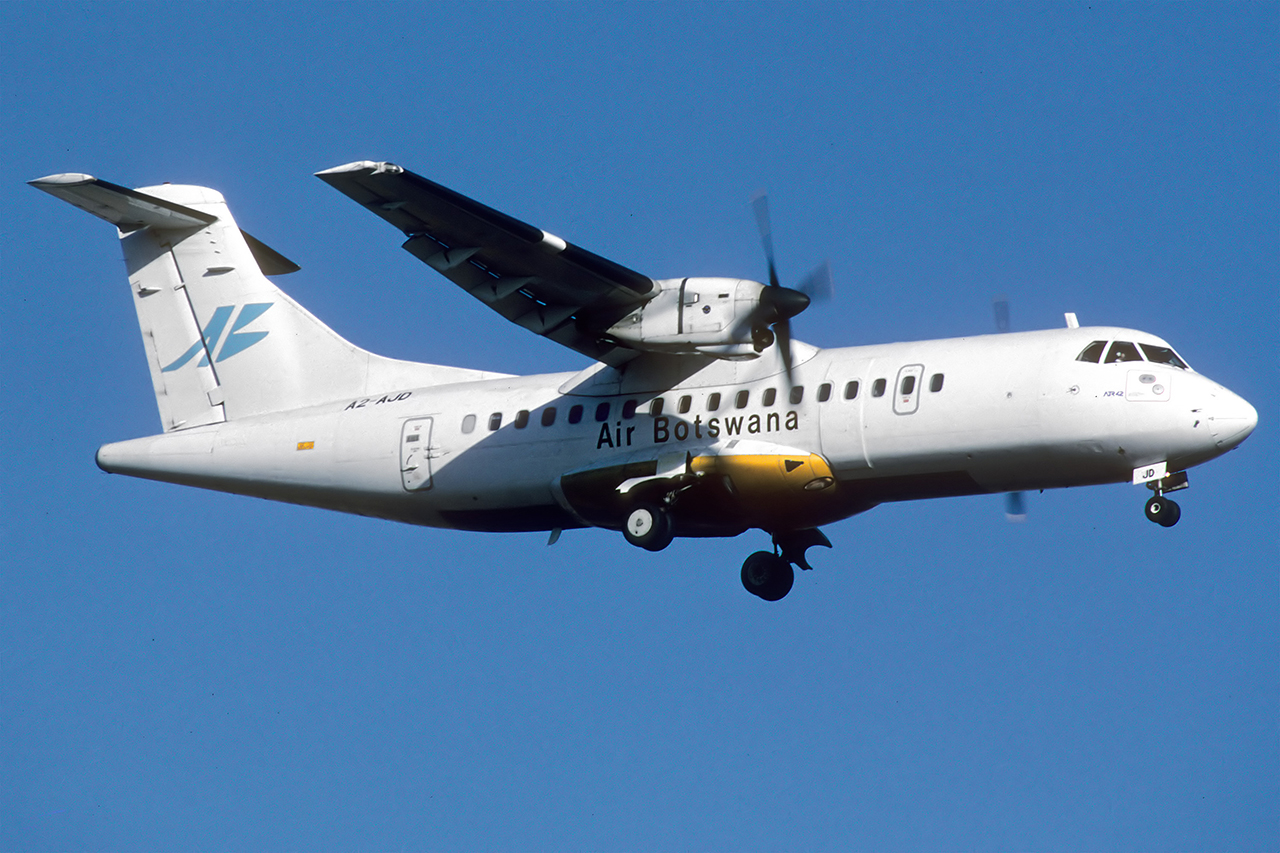
- A2-AJD, the third ATR 42 involved in the accident, photographed in 1998
- Type: ATR 42-320
- Operator: Air Botswana
- Registration: A2-AJD
- Occupants: 0

On 11 October 1999, Air Botswana pilot Chris Phatswe intentionally crashed an ATR 42 into a group of parked aircraft of the same airline at Sir Seretse Khama International Airport in Gaborone, Botswana. He was the only casualty. His actions effectively crippled operations for Air Botswana.

== Aircraft ==
The aircraft involved, manufactured in 1988, was an ATR 42-320 registered as A2-ABB with serial number 101. It was equipped with two Pratt & Whitney Canada PW121 engines.

== Incident ==
On 11 October 1999, Phatswe commandeered an ATR 42-320 from the Air Botswana section of the terminal at Sir Seretse Khama International Airport and took off. For two hours he circled the airport, radioing the control tower and announcing his intention to kill himself. The airport was evacuated as a precaution; passengers later reported a good deal of panic in the terminal. Officials in the tower attempted to convince him to land; efforts were led by General Tebogo Masire, then deputy commander of the Botswana Defence Force. Phatswe threatened to crash it into an Air Botswana building, saying he had a grudge against the airline's management. He demanded to speak to Ian Khama, Botswana's then vice-president, but when officials in the control tower told Phatswe that there were people in the Air Botswana building, he changed his mind. Shortly after being put through to Khama, the ATR-42 began to run out of fuel, so Phatswe carried out a successful landing, but instead of surrendering to airport security, he proceeded to taxi towards the apron at high speed, slamming the stolen plane into two other ATR-42s on the ramp. All three planes were destroyed in a fiery crash, and Phatswe was killed. He was the only casualty.

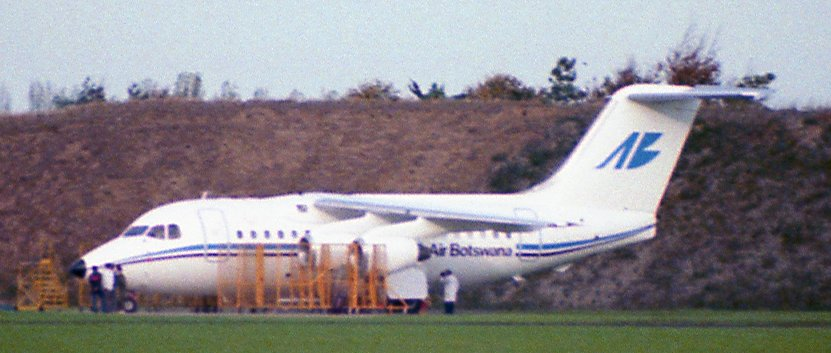
A2-ABD, the only aircraft left after this incident

The three planes were the only operational craft then in the Air Botswana fleet; a fourth plane, a BAe-146, was grounded with technical trouble at the time. Consequently, Phatswe's actions effectively crippled operations for the flag carrier.

== Motives ==
Phatswe had repeatedly threatened airport authorities, telling them that he would kill himself, but never gave a reason. At the time of the incident he was on medical leave from the airline, having failed a physical examination two months previously and been declared unfit to fly; consequently, he was not authorized to take the plane. Airport security was reported to be lax, and it was said to be quite easy for somebody to steal an aircraft.

== See also ==
- 1977 Connellan air disaster - suicide attack by a disgruntled former airline employee using a stolen aircraft
- 2018 Horizon Air Bombardier Q400 incident - Aircraft theft and suicide crash by a ground employee of Horizon Air
- Accidents and incidents involving the ATR 42 family
- List of accidents and incidents involving airliners by location § Botswana
- List of accidents and incidents involving commercial aircraft
