= Sir Seretse Khama International Airport =

- IATA: GBE; ICAO: FBSK

Summary
- Airport type: Public
- Operator: Civil Aviation Authority of Botswana
- Serves: Gaborone
- Location: Gaborone, Botswana
- Opened: 1984
- Hub for: Air Botswana
- Elevation AMSL: 3,299 ft (1,006 m)
- Coordinates: 24°33′19″S 025°55′06″E
- Website: www.caab.co.bw

Maps
- Interactive Map
- Location within Botswana

Runways
Direction	Length		Surface
Direction	m	ft	Surface
08/26	4,000	13,123	Concrete

Statistics (2024)
- Passengers: 407,813
- Aircraft Movements: 10,755
- Source: CAAB, Aircraft and Passenger Statistics

Sir Seretse Khama International Airport (IATA: GBE, ICAO: FBSK), located 15 kilometres (9 mi) north of downtown Gaborone, is the main international airport of the capital city of Botswana. It is the busiest airport in the country. In 2017 the airport got its first special economic zone which would house in the following departments: CAAB, Botswana Innovation Hub, ITPA and diamond hub for diamond sector.

== History ==
Prior to the airport, the city of Gaborone was served by Gaborones Airport. By the 1980s, its inadequate infrastructure prompted the construction of a new replacement airport in 1982. The airport was opened in 1984, and was dedicated to Seretse Khama, the first president of Botswana, who led the country to independence in 1966.

The new airport was built on a greenfield site, having a 3,000 metre long runway capable of handling the Boeing 747 and Douglas DC-10. However, the terminal was only built to process 100 passengers per hour, creating a stark mismatch with the runway's wide-body capabilities.

British Airways started flying to the airport in 1987 from London Heathrow via Johannesburg, but the route was discontinued in April 1999.

In 2008, the airport started a major expansion. The old terminal could handle only 225 people at a time. The terminal size increased from 3,140 m^{2} to 17,000 m^{2}. New baggage and screening equipment were installed. The existing runway was rehabilitated and 4,000 m parallel taxiway was built.

View of Sir Seretse Khama International Airport from tarmac

== Airlines and destinations ==
Airlines	Destinations
Air Botswana	Cape Town, Durban, Francistown, Harare, Johannesburg–O. R. Tambo, Kasane, Lusaka, Maun, Windhoek–Hosea Kutako
Airlink	Cape Town, Johannesburg–O. R. Tambo
Ethiopian Airlines	Addis Ababa
South African Airways	Johannesburg–O. R. Tambo

Destination Map
Destinations from GBE.

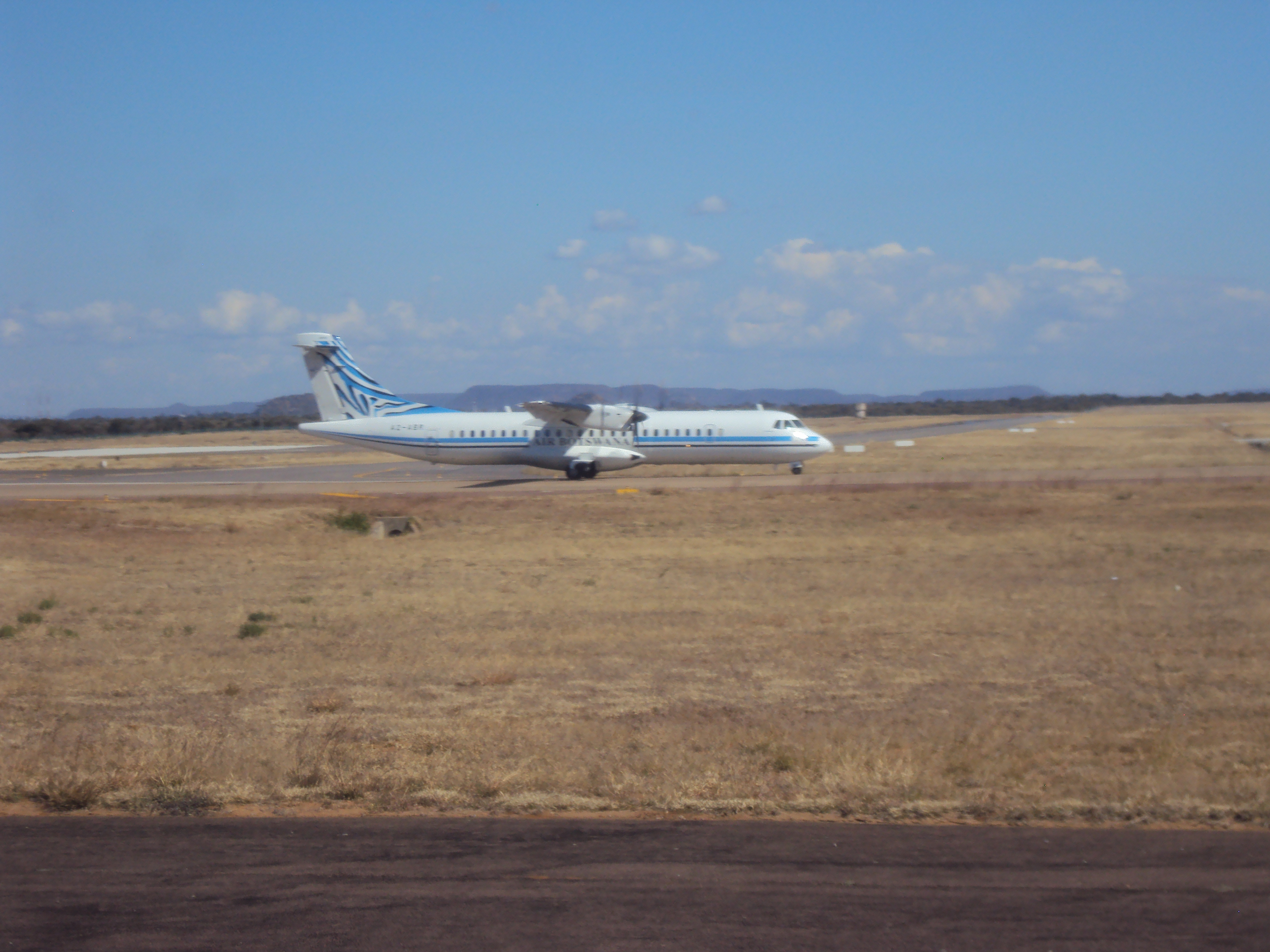
Air Botswana ATR 72-500 at Khama Airport in 2011.

== Statistics ==
Aircraft and Passenger Movements
Year	Aircraft Movements			Passenger Movements		
Year	International	Domestic	Total	International	Domestic	Total
2012	10,477	5,673	16,150	306,360	100,616	406,976
2013	10,552	5,794	16,346	296,538	104,562	401,100
2014	11,718	4,830	16,548	293,125	91,251	384,376
2015	12,442	5,121	17,563	298,717	83,563	382,280
2016	12,585	4,854	17,439	316,874	85,991	402,865
2017	11,497	4,483	15,980	345,975	78,665	424,640
2018	11,381	4,754	16,135	362,914	81,55	444,473
2019	11,969	4,331	16,299	392,106	78,866	470,972
2020	3,719	2,199	5,918	86,137	31,090	117,227
2021	5,076	2,776	7,852	108,238	37,924	146,162
2022	6,937	2,946	9,883	246,286	57,414	303,700
2023	7,499	2,964	10,463	291,739	61,626	353,365
2024	7,806	2,949	10,755	343,767	64,046	407,813

== Botswana Defence Force Air Wing ==
Botswana Defence Force Air Wing VIP Flight Wing is based at the airport.

== Accidents and incidents ==
On 11 October 1999, an Air Botswana pilot, Captain Chris Phatswe, commandeered a parked Aérospatiale ATR 42 aircraft A2-ABB without authorization in the early morning and took off. Once in the air, he asked by radio to speak to the president, Air Botswana's general manager, the station commander, central police station and his girlfriend, among others. Because the president was out of the country, he was allowed to speak to the vice president. In spite of all attempts to persuade him to land and discuss his grievances, he stated he was going to crash into some aircraft on the apron. After a total flying time of about 2 hours, he did two loops and then crashed at 200 knots (370 km/h; 230 mph) into Air Botswana's two other ATR 42s parked on the apron. The captain was killed but there were no other casualties.

Airline sources say the pilot had been grounded on medical reasons, refused reinstatement and regrounded until February 2000. Air Botswana operations were crippled, as the airline temporarily only had one aircraft left – a BAe 146 that was grounded with technical problems.
