= Phillip Gaonwe Matante International Airport =

Airport in Botswana

Phillip Gaonwe Matante International Airport Francistown International Airport
- IATA: FRW; ICAO: FBPM

Summary
- Airport type: Public / military
- Owner: Government of Botswana
- Operator: Civil Government (international airport); Botswana Defence Force (air base)
- Serves: Francistown, Botswana
- Elevation AMSL: 3,312 ft (1,009 m)
- Coordinates: 21°09′35″S 27°28′30″E
- Website: caab.co.bw

Map
- Location of the airport in Botswana

Runways
Direction	Length		Surface
Direction	m	ft	Surface
11/29	2,230	7,316	Asphalt
13/31	3,000	9,843	Asphalt
- Sources: GCM

Phillip Gaonwe Matante International Airport (IATA: FRW, ICAO: FBPM), also known as Francistown International Airport, serves Francistown, Botswana. The public airport, which caters to both commercial and national military's aircraft, is on the western edge of the city. The airport was named after Philip Matante.

== Facilities ==
The new terminal building opened in 2011 and the old terminal at the eastern end of the airport was transferred to the Botswana Defence Force. There are no jet bridges, thus passengers must walk from the terminal to designated parking areas on the tarmac in front of the terminal. A new control tower was built next to the new terminal.

The passenger terminal has an arrival and departure hall. A small retail area hosts car rental companies, an ATM and a post office.

Other tenants include Customs and Excise, Immigration, Meteorological Service Office, Air BP Fuels, and Air Botswana Offices.

== Airline and destinations ==
Francistown handles domestic and regional (within Africa) flights.

Airlines	Destinations
Air Botswana	Gaborone, Johannesburg–OR Tambo

== Botswana Defence Force Air Wing ==
Francistown is home to one of three Botswana Defence Force Air Wing air bases and home to the Z3 Transport (Liaison) Squadron and the Z12 Transport Squadron.

The air base is located in the old terminal building at the east end of the airport with the large steel hangar.

== See also ==
- Transport in Botswana
- List of airports in Botswana
