= List of companies of Namibia =

Location of Namibia

Namibia is a country in southern Africa whose western border is the Atlantic Ocean. It shares land borders with Zambia and Angola to the north, Botswana to the east and South Africa to the south and east. Although it does not border Zimbabwe, a part of less than 200 metres of the Zambezi River (essentially a small bulge in Botswana to achieve a Botswana/Zambia micro-border) separates the two countries. Namibia gained independence from South Africa on 21 March 1990, following the Namibian War of Independence. Its capital and largest city is Windhoek, and it is a member state of the United Nations (UN), the Southern African Development Community (SADC), the African Union (AU), and the Commonwealth of Nations.

Agriculture, herding, tourism and the mining industry – including mining for gem diamonds, uranium, gold, silver, and base metals – form the basis of its economy.

For further information on the types of business entities in this country and their abbreviations, see "Business entities in Namibia".

== Notable firms ==
This list includes notable companies with primary headquarters located in the country. The industry and sector follow the Industry Classification Benchmark taxonomy. Organizations which have ceased operations are included and noted as defunct.

Notable companies Status: P=Private, S=State; A=Active, D=Defunct
Name	Industry	Sector	Headquarters	Founded	Notes	Status	
Air Namibia	Consumer services	Airlines	Windhoek	1946	Airline	P	D
Bank of Namibia	Financials	Banks	Windhoek	1990	Central bank	S	A
Bank Windhoek	Financials	Banks	Windhoek	1982	Bank	P	A
Bidvest Namibia	Consumer goods	Farming & fishing	Windhoek	1989	Fishing	P	A
Development Bank of Namibia	Financials	Banks	Windhoek	2004	State bank	S	A
FIDES Bank Namibia	Financials	Banks	Ongwediva	2010	Commercial bank	P	A
Gazza Music Productions	Consumer services	Broadcasting & entertainment	Windhoek	2004	Music label	P	A
Kalahari Express Airlines	Consumer services	Airlines	Windhoek	1997	Airline, defunct 2000	P	D
Mshasho Productions	Consumer services	Broadcasting & entertainment	Windhoek	2003	Record label	P	A
MTC Namibia	Telecommunications	Mobile telecommunications	Windhoek	1994	Mobile network	P	A
Namib Mills	Consumer goods	Farming & fishing	Windhoek	1982	Grain processing	P	A
Namibia Breweries Limited	Consumer goods	Brewers	Windhoek	1920	Brewery	P	A
The Namibian	Consumer services	Publishing	Windhoek	1985	Newspaper	P	A
Namibian Broadcasting Corporation	Consumer services	Broadcasting & entertainment	Windhoek	1990	State television	S	A
Namibian Port Authority	Industrials	Transportation services	Walvis Bay	1994	Port authority	S	A
NamPost	Industrials	Delivery services	Windhoek	1814	Postal services	P	A
NamPower	Utilities	Conventional electricity	Windhoek	1964	Power utility	S	A
NamWater	Utilities	Water	Windhoek	1997	Water utility	S	A
Ohorongo Cement	Industrials	Building materials & fixtures	Windhoek	2007	Cement	P	A
Omutumwa	Consumer services	Publishing	Windhoek	2010	Newspaper	P	A
Telecom Namibia	Telecommunications	Fixed line telecommunications	Windhoek	1992	State telecom	S	A
TN Mobile	Telecommunications	Mobile telecommunications	Windhoek	2007	Cell network	P	A
TransNamib	Industrials	Railroads	Windhoek	1895	Railroads	S	A
Windhoek Country Club Resort	Consumer services	Hotels	Windhoek	1995	Resort	P	A
Yaziza Entertainment	Consumer services	Broadcasting & entertainment	Windhoek	2006	Record label	P	A

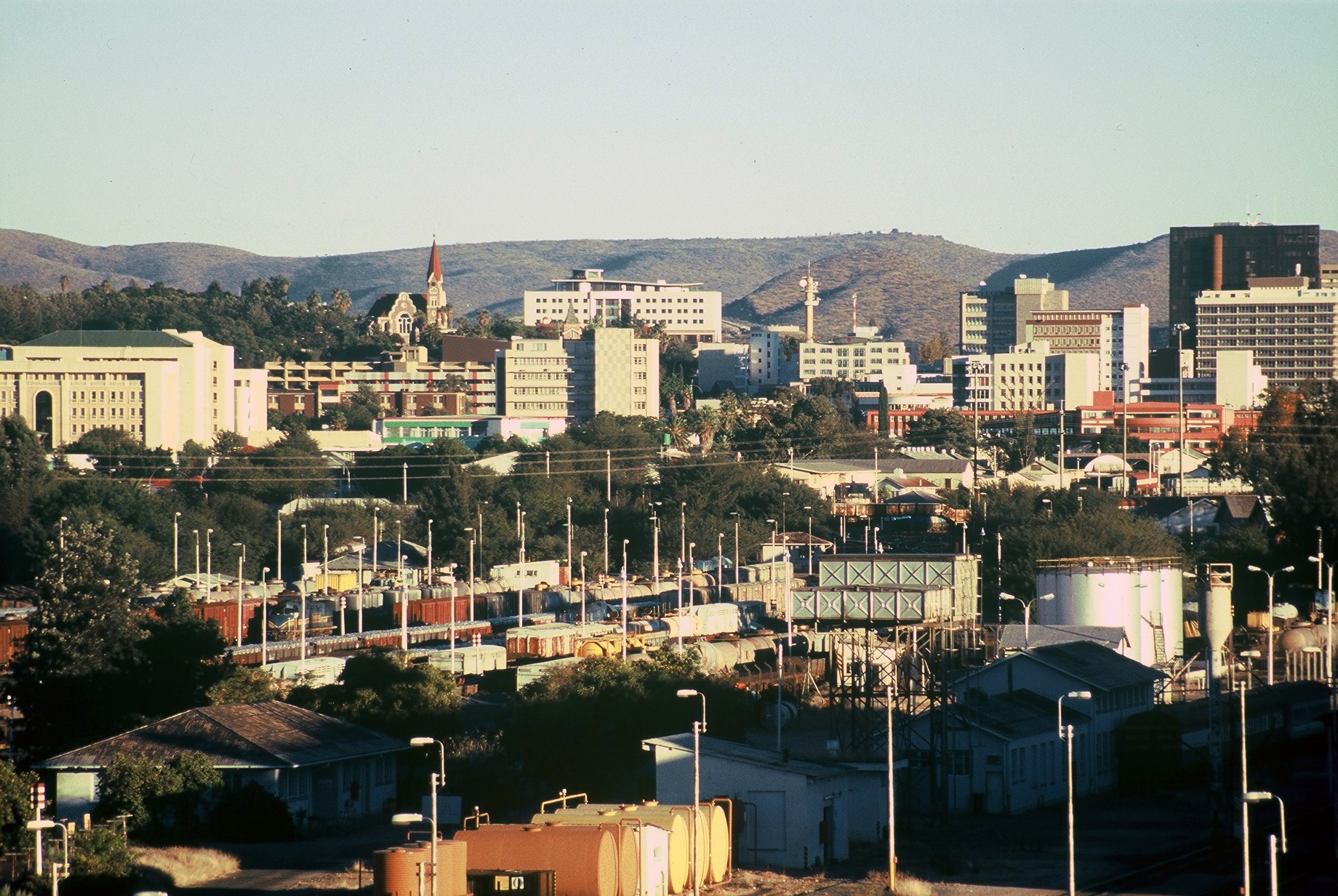
Downtown Windhoek

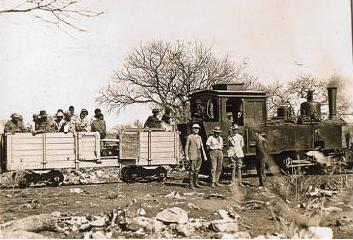
Otavi Mining and Railway Company

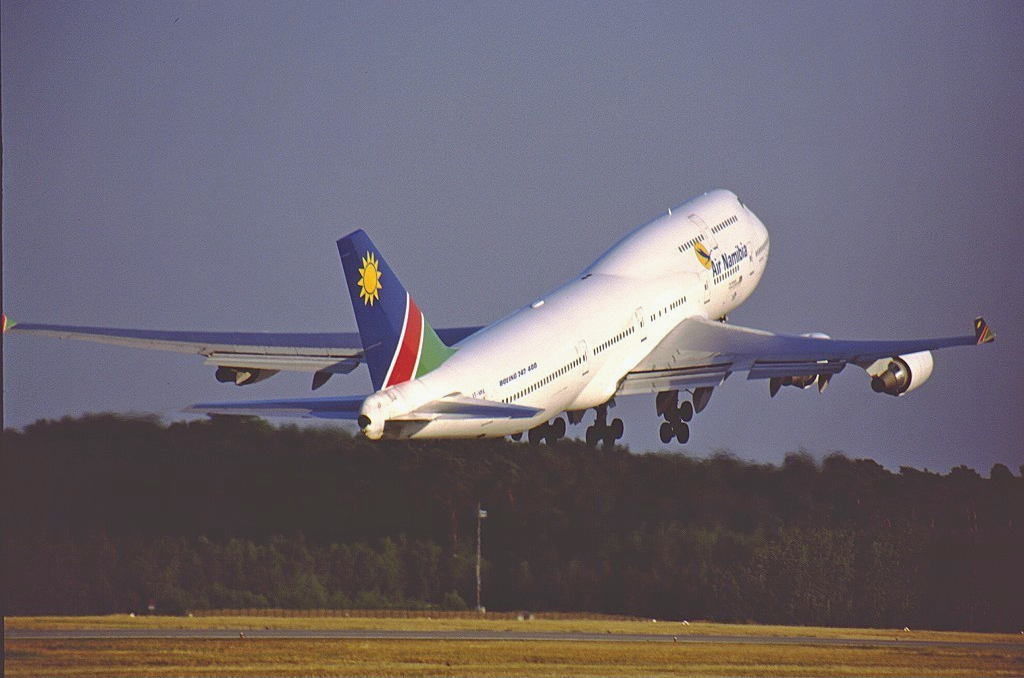
An Air Namibia Boeing 747-400

== See also ==
- List of airlines of Namibia
- List of banks in Namibia
- List of state-owned enterprises in Namibia
