= Air Namibia =

Flag carrier of Namibia, 1946–2021

IATA	ICAO	Call sign
SW	NMB	NAMIBIA
- Founded: November 1946; 80 years ago (as South West Air Transport)
- Ceased operations: February 11, 2021
- Hubs: Hosea Kutako International Airport
- Secondary hubs: Eros Airport
- Frequent-flyer program: Reward$
- Fleet size: 10
- Destinations: 18
- Parent company: Government of Namibia (fully owned)
- Headquarters: Windhoek, Namibia
- Key people: Theo Mberirua (interim CEO)
- Employees: 600 (February 2021)

Air Namibia (Pty) Limited, which traded as Air Namibia, was the national airline of Namibia, headquartered in the country's capital, Windhoek. It operated scheduled domestic, regional, and international passenger and cargo services, having its international hub in Windhoek Hosea Kutako International Airport and a domestic hub at the smaller Windhoek Eros Airport. As of December 2013, the carrier was wholly owned by the Namibian government. Air Namibia was a member of both the International Air Transport Association and the African Airlines Association. As of early 2026, the Namibian government is in the process of establishing a new airline, Namibia Air, to succeed Air Namibia which ceased operations on February 11, 2021.

== History ==
=== Early years ===
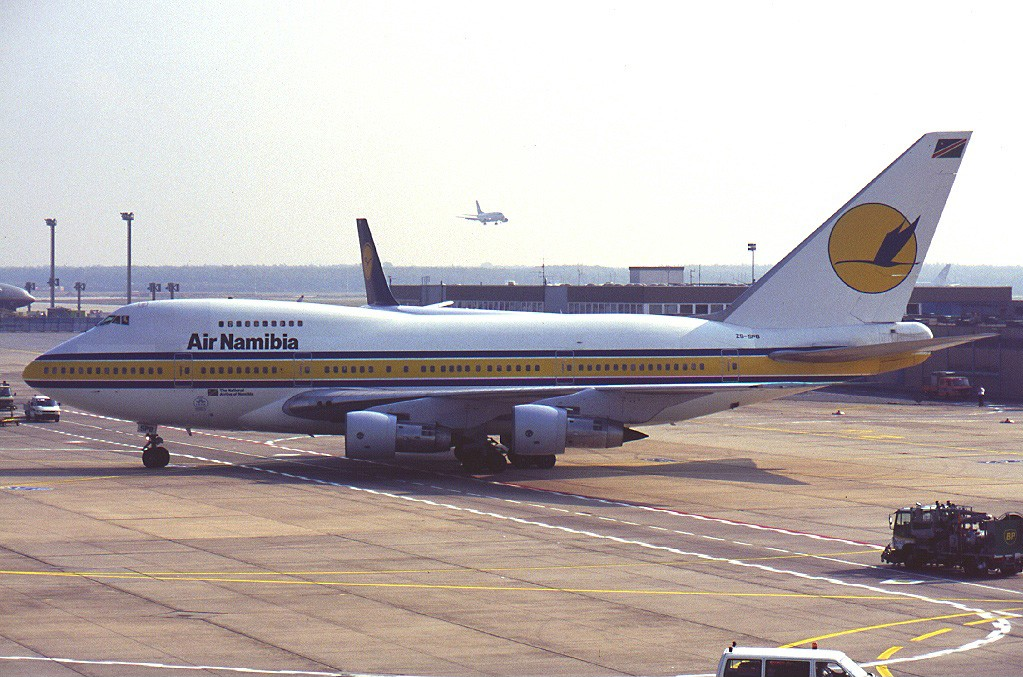
An Air Namibia Boeing 747SP at Frankfurt Airport in 1996.

The origins of the airline trace back to November 1946, when South West Air Transport (SWAT) was established. Using Ryan Navion aircraft, this carrier started operations in 1949 linking Windhoek with Grootfontein. (Note: Also reported to having started operations in 1948.) Charter and cargo flights were also undertaken. In 1950, the company started feeder services for South African Airways. By 1958, a fleet of seven Ryan Navions and one de Havilland Dragon Rapide served a route network that included Grootfontein, Tsumeb, Otjiwarongo, Outjo, Swakopmund, Walvis Bay and Windhoek. On 26 March 1959, SWAT merged with Oryx Aviation — a small passenger airline established three years earlier— to form South West Airways (Afrikaans: Suidwes Lugdiens). IATA membership was gained later that year.

Two Cessna 205s were purchased, entering the fleet in December 1962 and eventually replacing the Navions. Namibair, set up as a charter airline in 1963, became a subsidiary company of Suidwes Lugdiens in 1966. In 1969, Safmarine acquired a 50% stake in Suidwes, eventually boosting its participation to 85%. At February 1970, the Suidwes fleet comprised four Piper Aztecs, one de Havilland Canada DHC-2 Beaver, two Piper PA-28 Cherokees, one Cessna 182, one Cessna 205, one Cessna 206, one Cessna 402, three Douglas DC-3s and five Piper PA-30 Twin Comanches; at this time the carrier had 45 employees. A Fairchild-Hiller FH-227 was acquired in 1974, and a Convair 580 was later incorporated into the fleet to perform charter flights carrying miners to their jobs in Grootfontein and Tsumeb.

Suidwes merged into Namib Air on 1 December 1978. The South West African government became the major shareholder in 1982. Following the creation of the South West Africa National Transport Corporation in 1986, Namib Air took over all air transport operations in the country. The airline was designated as the country's flag carrier in 1987. That year, two 19-seater Beech 1900s were bought. In 1988, the company was incorporated into the Namibian state-owned holding company Transnamib. On 6 August 1989, a Boeing 737-200 leased from South African Airways that flew the Windhoek–Johannesburg route inaugurated the carrier's jet era. In October the same year, a third Beech 1900 was incorporated into the fleet.

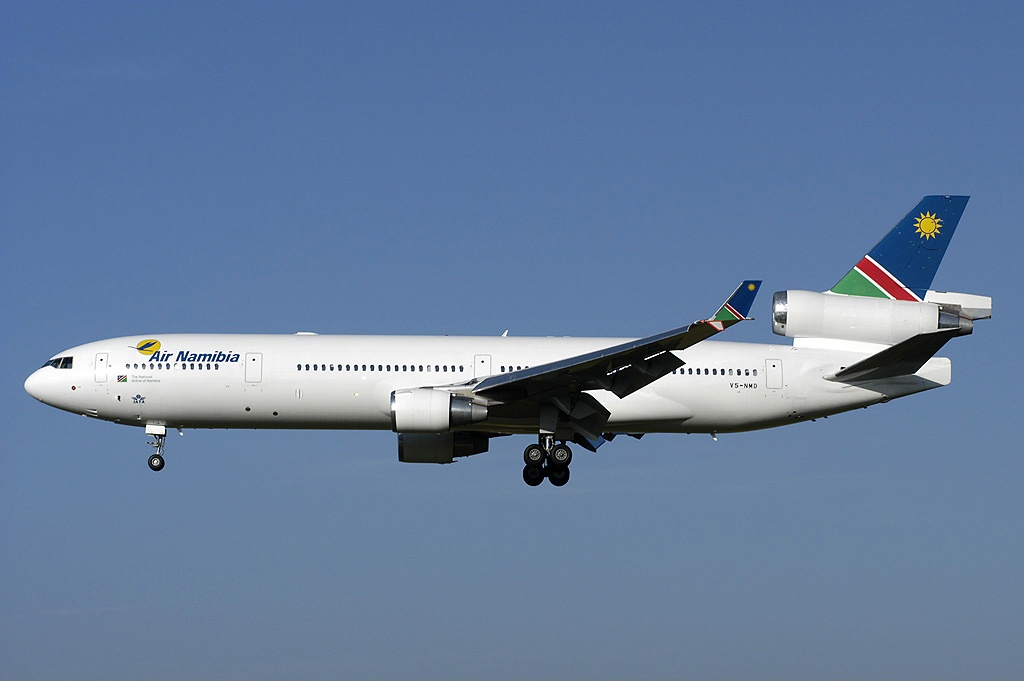
An Air Namibia McDonnell Douglas MD-11 at Zurich Airport in 2005.

Services to Lusaka and Luanda were launched in 1990 and 1991, respectively. Following the independence of the country, the company was re-christened again, adopting the current name of Air Namibia in October 1991. The early 1990s also saw the launch of long-haul services to Europe: the Windhoek–Frankfurt route started being flown in 1991 twice a week using a Boeing 747SP, and London was included into the route network in 1992, with a non-stop flight. In 1993, services to Frankfurt, which were served twice-weekly, were also extended to London. Air Namibia was re-absorbed into the Namibian government after an injection of US$3,700,000 (equivalent to $7,308,595 in 2025) in 1998, following the precarious cash position it was led into by TransNamib. LTU, Germany's second largest airline at the time, entered into a codeshare agreement with Air Namibia in February 1998. Air Namibia acquired a new Boeing 747-400 Combi in April 1999 with financial aid from the U.S. Export Import Bank. Named Welwitschia, the aircraft was handed over by the manufacturer in October that year. The new machine came to replace the carrier's Boeing 747SP, and was retired in 2004. That year, the carrier started flying the McDonnell Douglas MD-11.

=== Developments since the 2000s ===
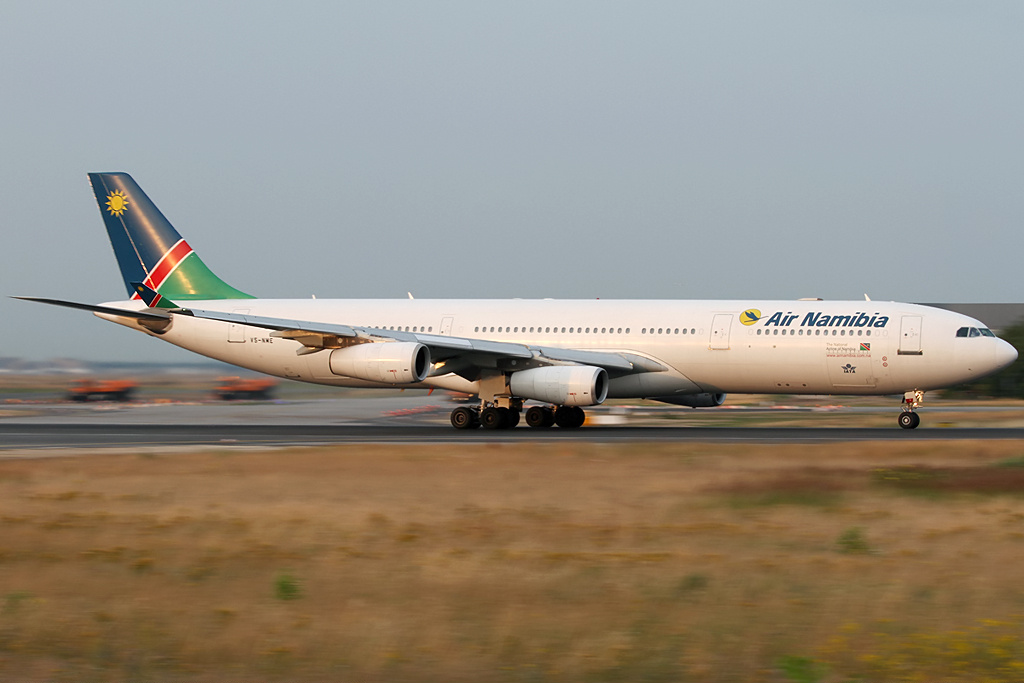
An Air Namibia Airbus A340-300 at Frankfurt Airport in 2013.

By April 2000, the airline's employees numbered 418. At this time, Air Namibia operated a Boeing 727-100, two Boeing 737-200 Advanced, one Boeing 747-400 Combi and three Raytheon Beech 1900Cs that served Cape Town, Frankfurt, Johannesburg, London, Luanda, Luderitz, Lusaka, Maun, Mokuti Lodge, Mpacha, Ondangwa, Oranjemund, Swakopmund, Victoria Falls, Walvis Bay and Windhoek. That year, the airline joined the African Airlines Association.

The first of three Embraer ERJ 135s the airline leased from Régional, intended to replace the Beechcraft 1900 fleet, was received in February 2011; likewise, the first of two leased Airbus A319-100s entered the fleet in October the same year. Intended as a replacement for the Boeing 737 fleet, the company ordered another two Airbus A319s in February 2012, in a deal worth US$90 million; in July the same year, the carrier signed an agreement for the lease of two Airbus A330-200s, aimed at replacing the Airbus A340-300s. Of the last two A319s ordered, the first one was incorporated into the fleet in early January 2013. In September 2013, Air Namibia took delivery of its first Airbus A330-200.

In April 2017, the airline was granted permission to fly to the United States by the US Department of Transportation. In March the airline completed a re-certification application by the International Civil Aviation Organisation (an audit process which was initiated in 2013), enabling the airline to fly to any EU member state.

=== Decline and shutdown ===
Air Namibia had been making losses since Namibian independence. In 2020, its assets stood at below 1 billion N$, while its liabilities amounted to 3 billion N$. Around 11 billion N$ had been provided by government over the previous 20 years. The airline was essentially "on death row".

On 8 July 2020 the Transportation Commission of Namibia suspended the carrier's Scheduled Air Services Licence, citing financial and safety concerns. In October 2020 the airline was given notice by Belgian lawyer Anicet Baum, of the company Challengair, claiming that Air Namibia was insolvent and unable to repay its debts to Challengeair (an amount of 18,s million Euro), which was settled to be repaid in instalments until September 2021.

On 11 February 2021, the Namibian government announced the immediate shutdown and liquidation of Air Namibia due to overwhelming debt and years of financial dependence from the state. At the time of closure, the airline operated nine aircraft and employed approximately 600 staff. The cost of shutting down the airline was estimated at US$453,000,000 (equivalent to $538,226,084 in 2025).

In late October 2021, a South African aviation company offered 3.2 billion Namibian dollars to purchase the airline.

=== Relaunch as Namibia Air ===
Following the liquidation of Air Namibia, the Namibian government announced plans to establish a new flag carrier to replace it, and ruled out re-establishing Air Namibia or continuing to use its name. In 2024, the name "Namibia Air" was approved. Namibia Air is anticipated to begin operations "between June and December" in 2026.

== Destinations ==
Following is a list of destinations Air Namibia flew to as part of its scheduled services prior to its shutdown, as of February 2021.

Country	City	Airport	Refs
Angola	Luanda	Quatro de Fevereiro Airport	
Angola	Ondjiva	Ondjiva Pereira Airport	
Botswana	Gaborone	Sir Seretse Khama International Airport	
Botswana	Maun	Maun Airport	
Germany	Frankfurt	Frankfurt Airport	
Germany	Munich	Munich Airport	
Ghana	Accra	Accra International Airport	
Namibia	Grootfontein	Grootfontein Airport	
Namibia	Halali	Halali Airport	
Namibia	Katima Mulilo	Mpacha Airport	
Namibia	Keetmanshoop	Keetmanshoop Airport	
Namibia	Lüderitz	Lüderitz Airport	
Namibia	Mokuti Lodge	Mokuti Lodge Airport	
Namibia	Okaukuejo	Okaukuejo Airport	
Namibia	Ondangwa	Ondangwa Airport	
Namibia	Oranjemund	Oranjemund Airport	
Namibia	Oshakati	Oshakati Airport	
Namibia	Rundu	Rundu Airport	
Namibia	Swakopmund	Swakopmund Airport	
Namibia	Tsumeb	Tsumeb Airport	
Namibia	Walvis Bay	Walvis Bay Airport	
Namibia	Windhoek	Hosea Kutako International Airport (Note: International hub)	
Namibia	Windhoek	Windhoek Eros Airport (Note: Domestic hub)	
Nigeria	Lagos	Murtala Mohammed International Airport	
South Africa	Alexander Bay	Alexander Bay Airport	
South Africa	Cape Town	Cape Town International Airport	
South Africa	Durban	King Shaka International Airport	
South Africa	Johannesburg	O. R. Tambo International Airport	
South Africa	Upington	Upington Airport	
United Kingdom	London	Gatwick Airport	
United Kingdom	London	Heathrow Airport	
Zambia	Livingstone	Livingstone Airport	
Zambia	Lusaka	Lusaka International Airport	
Zimbabwe	Harare	Robert Mugabe International Airport	
Zimbabwe	Victoria Falls	Victoria Falls Airport	

=== Codeshare agreements ===
Air Namibia codeshared with the following airlines, as of September 2017:

- Condor
- Ethiopian Airlines
- Kenya Airways
- Turkish Airlines

== Fleet ==
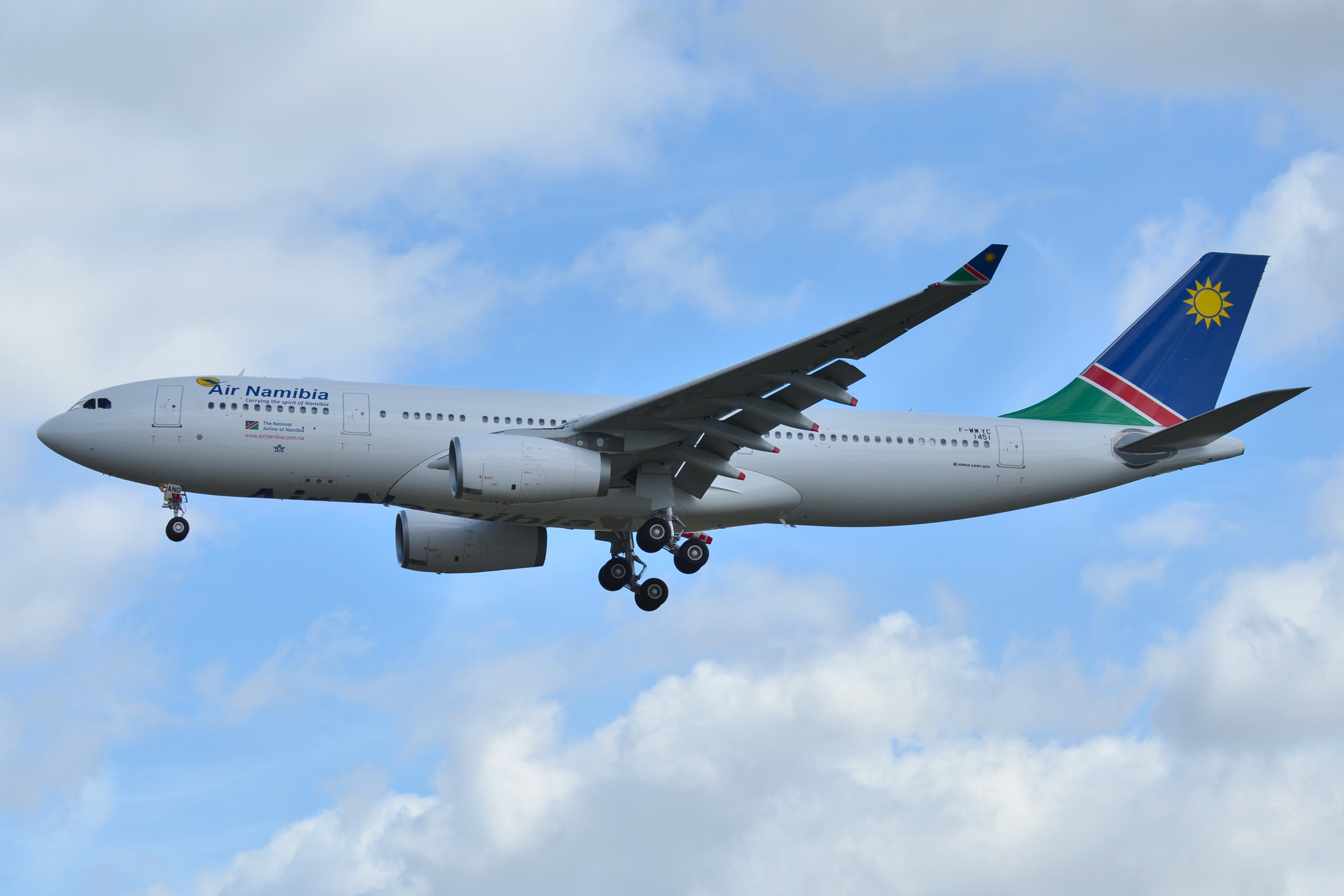
Air Namibia Airbus A330-200

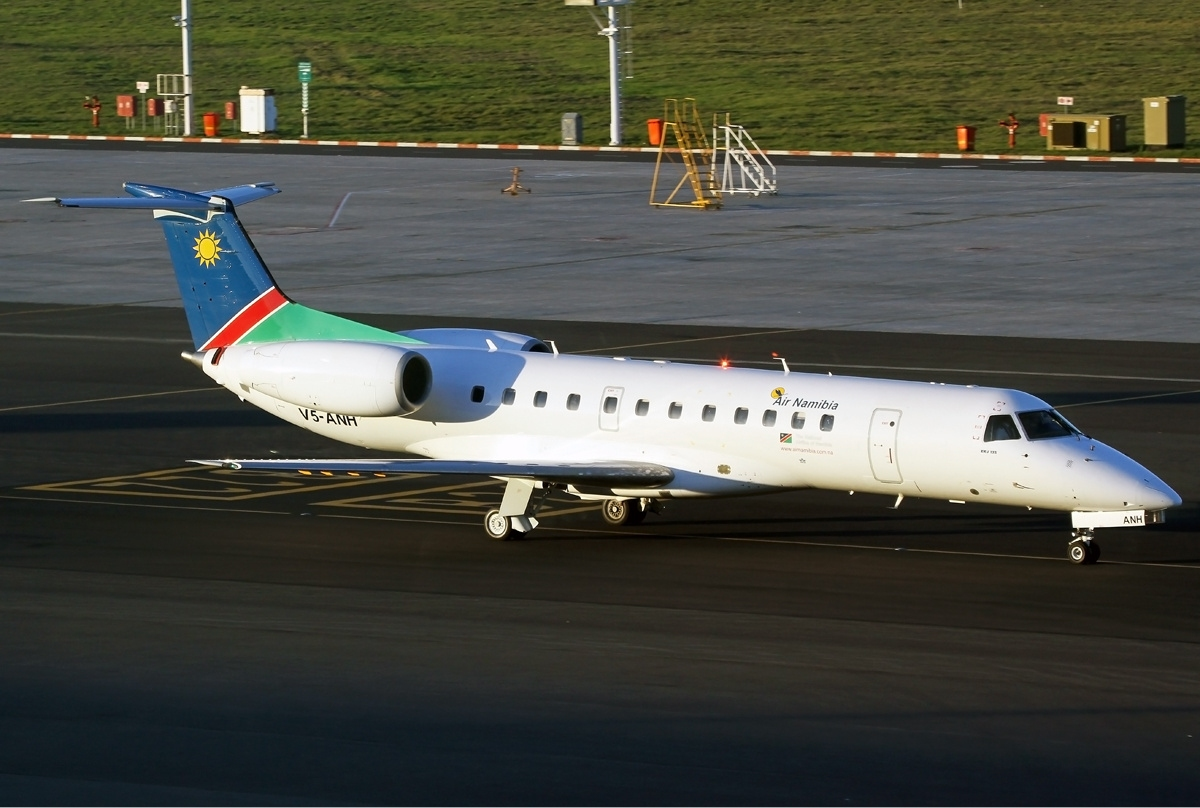
Air Namibia Embraer ERJ 135ER

=== Final fleet ===
The Air Namibia fleet consisted of the following aircraft (as of August 2019):

Air Namibia fleet
Aircraft	In service	Orders	Passengers			Notes
Aircraft	In service	Orders	C	Y	Total	Notes
Airbus A319-100	4	—	16	96	112	
Airbus A330-200	2	—	30	214	244	
Embraer ERJ 135ER	4	2	—	37	37	
Embraer ERJ 145ER	—	4	—	50	50	
Total	10	6				

=== Fleet development ===
In recent developments regarding the Embraer ERJ-135-fleet, Westair Aviation, a 100% Namibian-owned company, acquired the four aircraft from the previous owner, Air France. According to the new owners, Westair would've enabled the upgrade and renewal of the domestic and regional fleet. In August 2017 the airline confirmed that it was committed to purchasing 2 new Embraer ERJ-135 and 4 new Embraer ERJ-145 jets, for delivery 2018 However, none of those were ever delivered prior to the airline's demise.

=== Former fleet ===
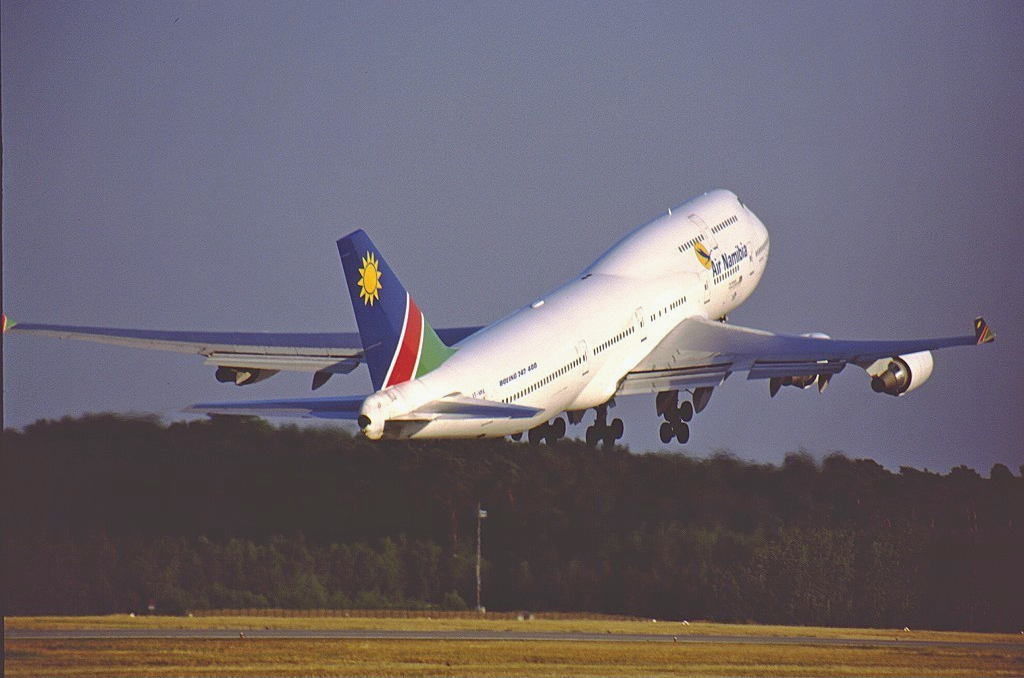
An Air Namibia Boeing 747-400 departs Frankfurt Airport in 2001.

The company previously operated the following aircraft:

- Airbus A340-300
- ATR 42
- Beechcraft 1900D
- Boeing 727
- Boeing 737-200
- Boeing 737-200C
- Boeing 737-500
- Boeing 737-800
- Boeing 747SP
- Boeing 747-400
- Boeing 747-400 Combi
- Boeing 767-300ER
- Cessna 182
- Cessna 210
- Cessna 310
- Cessna 402
- Cessna 404
- Cessna 414
- Convair 580
- Douglas C-47A
- Douglas C-47B
- Douglas C-54A
- Douglas C-54B
- DHC-8-300
- Douglas DC-4
- Douglas DC-6B
- Fairchild Hiller FH-227
- Fokker F-28-3000
- Fokker F-28-4000
- HS 748 Series 2A
- Indonesian Aerospace CN-235
- McDonnell Douglas MD-11
- Piper PA-31 Navajo
- Piper PA-34 Seneca

== See also ==
- List of airlines of Namibia
- List of defunct airlines of Namibia
- Transport in Namibia

== Bibliography ==
- Guttery, Ben R. (1998). Encyclopedia of African Airlines. Jefferson, NC: McFarland & Company. ISBN 0-7864-0495-7.
- Gaskell, K. (2001). South African skies. Shrewsbury: Airlife Publishing Ltd.
