= Kalahari (disambiguation) =

The Kalahari Desert is a large semi-arid savannah in southern Africa.

Kalahari may also refer to:

== Animals ==
- Kalahari Red, a breed of goat originating from South Africa
- Kalahari scrub robin, a species of bird in the Muscicapidae family

== Companies and organizations ==
- Kalahari Resorts, a water park resort chain
- Kalahari Express Airlines, a former airline based in Windhoek, Namibia
- First People of the Kalahari, a local Bushman advocacy organization in Botswana
- Kalahari Tea, an company that sells and distributes speciality tea

== Places ==
- Kalahari Craton, a craton that that occupies a large portion of South Africa
- Kalahari Basin, a large lowland area covering most of Botswana
- Kalahari Deposits, a Mesozoic geologic formation
- Central Kalahari Game Reserve, a national park in the Kalahari desert of Botswana
- Trans-Kalahari Corridor, a paved highway corridor in Africa
- Trans-Kalahari Railway, a planned railway set to run between Namibia and Botswana.
- Kalahari acacia–baikiaea woodlands, an ecoregion located in Botswana, northern Namibia, South Africa and Zimbabwe
- Kalahari Gemsbok National Park, a section of Kgalagadi Transfrontier Park
- Tswalu Kalahari Reserve, a private game reserve in South Africa

== Miscellaneous ==
- Kalahari Constituency, an electoral constituency in Omaheke Region, Namibia
- 1702 Kalahari, a main-belt asteroid
- Kalahari melon, an unofficial name for the citron melon
