= Air Siam =

Airline of Thailand (1965–1976)

IATA	ICAO	Call sign
VG	—	AIR SIAM
- Founded: 15 September 1965
- Commenced operations: 1970
- Ceased operations: 1976
- Hubs: Don Mueang International Airport
- Key people: Prince Varanand (founder)

Air Siam was an airline based in Thailand which operated from 1965 until 1976.

== History ==
The airline was established as Varan Air-Siam on 15 September 1965 by Prince Varanand, who was the major shareholder at the time. To establish the airline's operations, Prince Varanand partnered with Scottish aviation veteran Captain William "Bill" / "Mac" McIntosh (formerly of the Royal Air Force and SAS), who served as Executive Vice President and Chief Pilot, alongside North American Vice President Albert "Al" Trop. Operations started in 1970 using Douglas DC-4 equipment, initially flying the Bangkok−Hong Kong route as a freighter service. Following an agreement with Overseas National Airways for the wet-lease of a Douglas DC-8-63 and operational assistance from Trans World Airlines, scheduled passenger services started in March 1971 serving Bangkok, Honolulu, Tokyo and Los Angeles. All these services were suspended in January 1972; the Bangkok–Hong Kong sector was reactivated in May the same year with a leased BAC One-Eleven and extended to Tokyo seven months later, in December 1972, operated with a Boeing 707.

In April 1974, the carrier placed an order for two Airbus A300s, one A300B2 and one A300B4, taking an option for one more of the longer-range variant. After taking delivery of the first of these aircraft on a lease basis from Airbus in October 1974, Air Siam became the second operator worldwide in deploying the type on scheduled services, after Air France. Also in 1974, the company placed an order for a McDonnell Douglas DC-10-30, to be used on the Bangkok–Los Angeles route. Rights for the routes the airline intended to deploy the A300s on were never granted, and the A300B2 was returned to the lessor just a year after it was incorporated into the fleet.

Before Air Siam started flying long-haul services, Thailand's flag carrier Thai International was the country's single long-haul operator. Already in 1974, the airline had accused both Thai International and the Thai Civil Aeronautics Board for obstructing their expansion plans. Despite various different Thai governments considering the possibility of a merger, this never materialised. A new government taking office in 1976 had a different vision and decided that Thailand should have just one long-haul carrier.

== Destinations ==
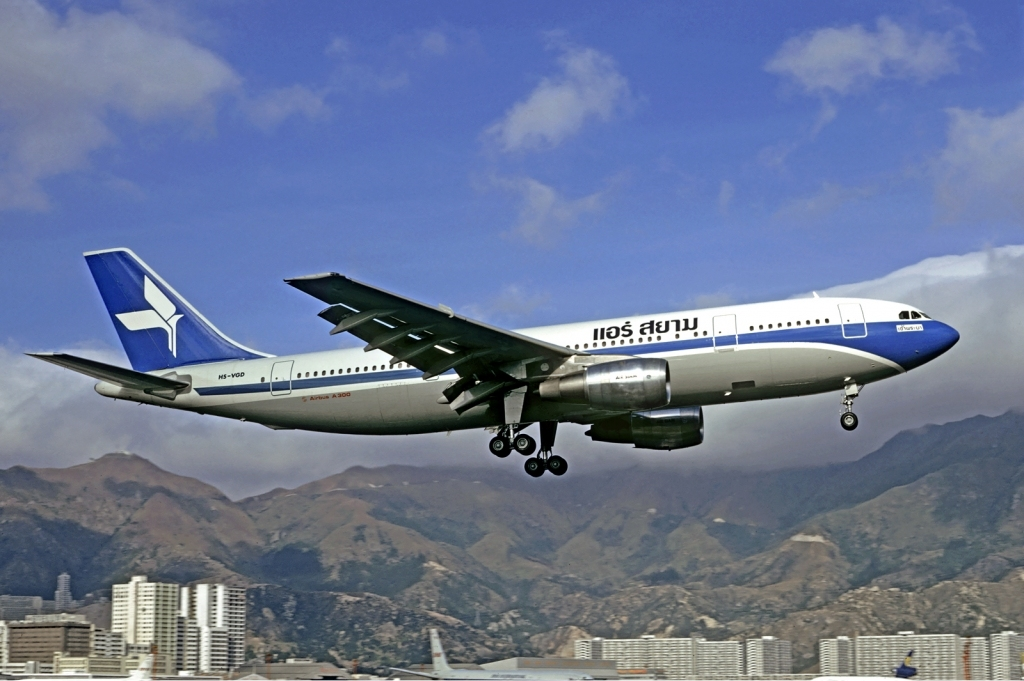
An Airbus A300 in Air Siam livery on short final to Kai Tak Airport in 1974.

Throughout its history, the airline served the following destinations:

- Hong Kong
  - Hong Kong – Kai Tak Airport
- Japan
  - Tokyo – Haneda Airport
- Thailand
  - Bangkok – Don Mueang International Airport (Hub)
- United States
  - Honolulu – Daniel K. Inouye International Airport

== Fleet ==
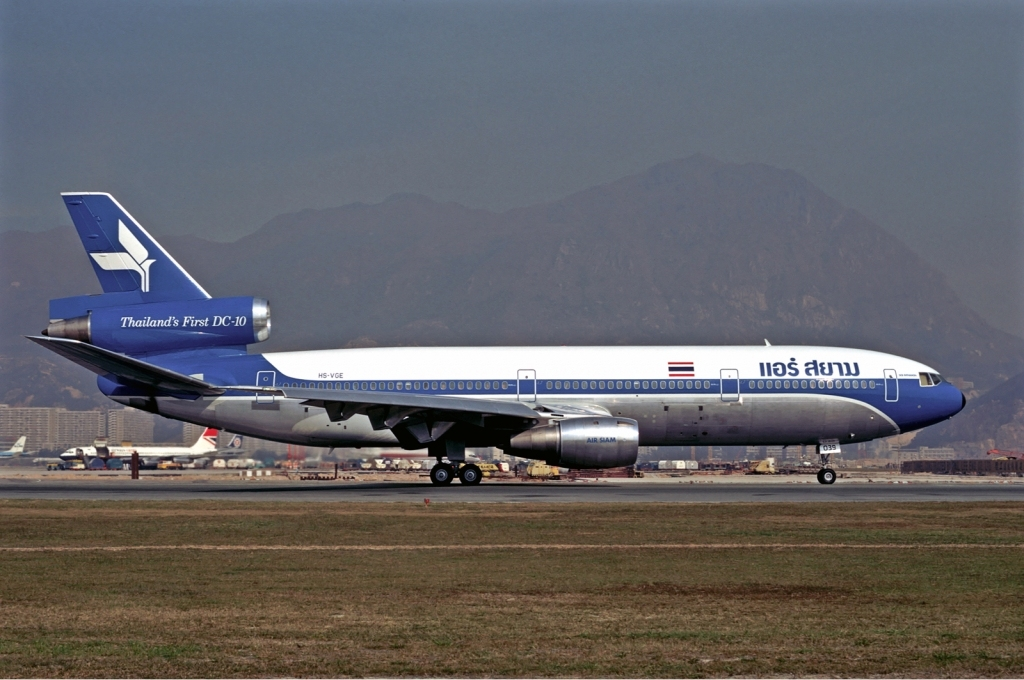
Air Siam's only McDonnell Douglas DC-10 at Kai Tak Airport in 1974. This aircraft was later involved in an accident in 1989.

Following is a list of aircraft operated by Air Siam all through its history:

- Airbus A300B2
- Airbus A300B4
- BAC One-Eleven 400
- Boeing 707-120
- Boeing 747-100
- Boeing 747-200B
- Douglas C-54A
- Douglas C-54B
- Douglas DC-4
- Douglas DC-8-60
- McDonnell Douglas DC-10-30

== See also ==
- List of airlines of Thailand

== Bibliography ==
- Davies, R.E.G. (1987). Rebels and reformers of the airways. Airlife Publishing Ltd. & Smithsonian Institution Press.
