= Allister Miller =

South African aviation pioneer

Allister Mackintosh Miller, DSO, OBE
- Born: September 10, 1892; Swaziland Protectorate
- Died: 1951 (aged 58–59)
- Military career
- Allegiance: United Kingdom; South Africa
- Branch: Royal Air Force; South African Air Force
- Rank: Lieutenant-Colonel
- Conflicts: World War I World War II
- Awards: Order of the British Empire; Distinguished Service Order

Lieutenant-Colonel Allister Miller (10 September 1892–1951) was a South African aviation pioneer, who contributed significantly to both military and civil aviation in South Africa during the first half of the twentieth century.

He originally qualified as an electrical engineer. On the outbreak of World War I in 1914, he joined the British Army, from which he transferred to the Royal Flying Corps as a pilot, in 1915. He fought in the skies over the Western Front in France and Belgium, and during 1916–17 he returned to South Africa on recruiting tours for the RFC. He recruited more than 8,000 volunteers, of whom 2,000 were accepted, most of them as pilots. They were known collectively as "Miller's Boys".

On the second recruitment drive, Miller took along two Royal Aircraft Factory B.E.2 aircraft and mechanics to assemble the aircraft in Cape Town. The aircraft were serial numbers A3109 and A3110 built by Wolseley Motors Limited. They were nicknamed Rio de Janeiro Britons Nos. 1 & 2 in honour of the fact that they were purchased with money raised by the British community in Rio de Janeiro. On 8 November 1917, one of these aircraft became the first to complete a long distance flight in South Africa by completing a Cape Town to Port Elizabeth flight in under six hours.

After the war, Miller pursued a career in civil aviation. His first two ventures were unsuccessful and short-lived: the South African Aerial Navigation Company, which became South African Aerial Transports Ltd (1919–1920), and Rhodesian Aerial Tours (1922).

In 1924, Miller was elected as a Member of Parliament. In this capacity, he successfully lobbied for government support for civil aviation. He gave flying demonstrations, toured the country to popularise flying, and encouraged the formation of flying clubs.

In 1929, Miller founded Union Airways, as the country's first commercial mail and passenger carrier. It amalgamated with South West African Airways in 1932, and was nationalised in 1934 and renamed South African Airways.

In 1936, Miller took part in the Portsmouth-to-Johannesburg Air Race, held to mark Johannesburg's Golden Jubilee.

During World War II, Miller served in the South African Air Force, where he commanded several flying schools. After the war, he worked as chief publicity officer for South African Airways.

The main road leading to the airport in his home town, Port Elizabeth, is named after him.
