= List of airlines of Namibia =

This is a list of airlines currently operating in Namibia.

== Active ==
Airline	Image	IATA	ICAO	Callsign	Commenced operations	Notes
Bay Air Aviation		N6	NMD	NOMAD AIR	1989	
FlyNamibia		WV	WAA		2021	
Scenic Air Namibia			ENR		2001	
Westair Aviation		WV	WAA	WESTAIR WINGS	1967	
Wilderness Air			WLD	WILDERNESS	1991	
Wings over Africa					1998	

== Defunct ==
Airline	Image	IATA	ICAO	Callsign	Commenced operations	Ceased operations	Notes
Aerolift					2003	2006	Passenger and cargo charters
Air Namibia		SW	NMB	NAMIBIA	1946	2021	
Caprivi Airways					1978	1982	Subsidiary of the Chantenis Group. Operated Douglas DC-3
Comav Aviation				SPEEDSTER	2003	2006	Operated Beech 1900, CASA 235, Reims-Cessna F406 Caravan II
FlyWestair		WV	WAA		2019	2021	Rebranded FlyNamibia. Operated Embraer ERJ-135
Hire & Fly					1977	1992	Founded by Chris Schutte. Rebranded Namibia Commercial Aviation. Operated Cessna 210, Cessna 310, Douglas DC-6
Kalahari Express Airlines		XY	KEA		1997	2000	
Namib Air		SW	NBM		1978	1991	Merged into Air Namibia
Namibia Commercial Aviation			MRE	MED RESCUE	1977	2010	
Namibia flyafrica					2015	2015	
Quickjet Aviation			QJA	QUICKJET	1999	2000	Operated BAe 146
Sefofane Air Charters					1991	2012	Renamed to Wilderness Air
South West African Airways					1930	1935	
Suidwes Lugdiens					1959	1989	Merged into Namib Air

== See also ==
- List of airlines
