= OKF =

OKF may refer to:

- OKF, the IATA code for Okaukuejo Airport, Namibia
- Open Knowledge Foundation, a global, non-profit network that promotes and shares information at no charge
- Open Knowledge Format, OKF, currently in version 0.1, a proposed standard by Google for the LLM-wiki pattern (markdown in a folder to document knowledge about concepts)
- OKF Corporation, a South Korean beverage company
