= Ohi =

Ohi or OHI may refer to:

- Elizabeth K. Ohi (1911–1976), Japanese-American lawyer
- Ohi Day, Greek celebration
- Ohi Racecourse, in Tokyo
- Ohi-Rail Corporation
- Ōi Nuclear Power Plant
- OHI, IATA Airport Code for Oshakati Airport
- Ruth Ohi, Japanese-Canadian picture book writer and illustrator, and winner of a 2009 Marilyn Baillie Picture Book Award
- typographical error of Ohio
