= Ruacana Airport =

Airport in Namibia

- IATA: none; ICAO: FYRC

Summary
- Airport type: Public
- Serves: Ruacana
- Elevation AMSL: 3,765 ft / 1,148 m
- Coordinates: 17°25′20″S 14°22′30″E

Map
- Location of the airport in Namibia

Runways
Direction	Length		Surface
Direction	m	ft	Surface
11/29	2,200	7,218	Asphalt
16/34	1,465	4,806	Gravel
- Source: GCM Google Maps

Ruacana Airport (ICAO: FYRC) is an airport serving Ruacana and the Ruacana hydroelectric power station in the Omusati Region of Namibia.

The Ruacana non-directional beacon (Ident: RC) is on the field.

== See also ==
- List of airports in Namibia
- Transport in Namibia
