= List of airports in Namibia =

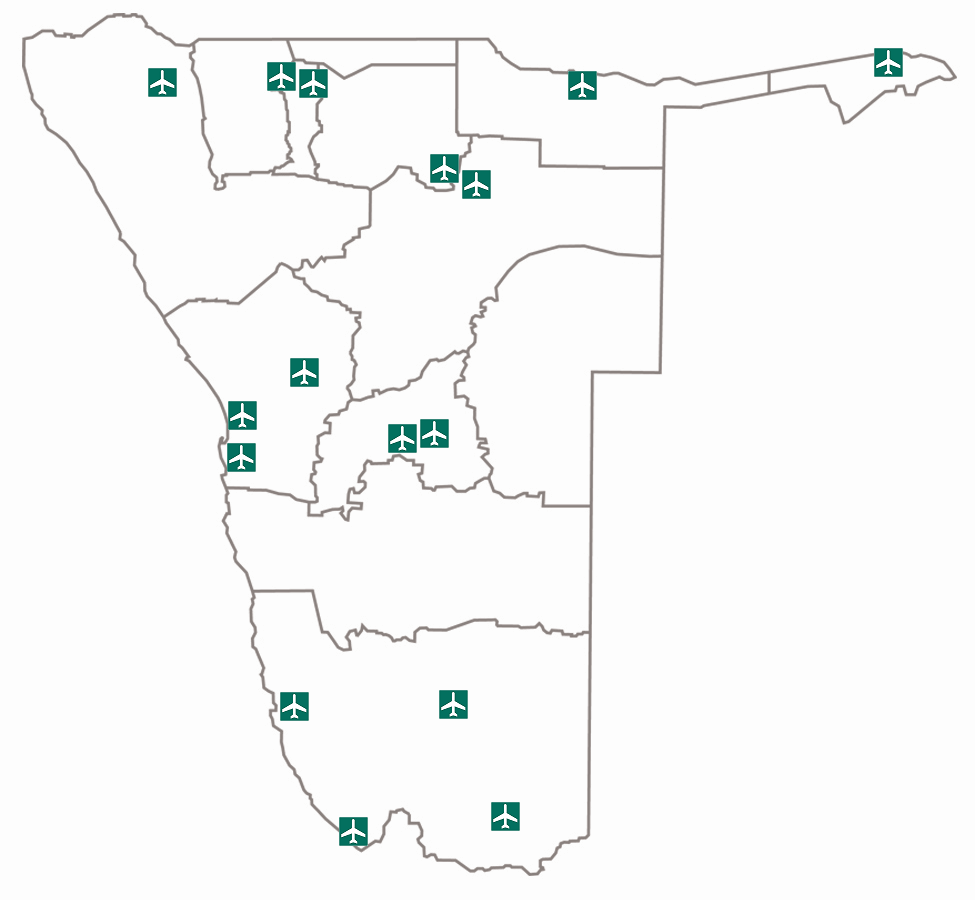
Map of airports in Namibia

This is a list of airports in Namibia, sorted by location.

== List of airports ==
Airport names shown in bold indicate the airport has scheduled service on commercial airlines.

Location	ICAO	IATA	Airport name
Arandis	FYAR	ADI	Arandis Airport
Bethanien	FYBC		Bethanien Airport
Cheetah Conservation Fund	FYHC		CCF Airstrip and Cheetahdrome Hangar
Eenhana	FYEN		Eenhana Airport
Gobabis	FYGB	GOG	Gobabis Airport
Grootfontein	FYGF	GFY	Grootfontein Air Force Base
Halali	FYHI	HAL	Halali Airport
Kamanjab	FYKJ		Kamanjab Airport
Karibib	FYKA		Karibib Air Force Base
Karasburg	FYKB	KAS	Karasburg Airport
Katima Mulilo	FYKM	MPA	**Katima Mulilo Airport**
Keetmanshoop	FYKT	KMP	Keetmanshoop Airport
Lüderitz	FYLZ	LUD	**Lüderitz Airport**
Mariental	FYML		Mariental Airport
Mokuti Lodge	FYMO	OKU	Mokuti Lodge Airport
Mount Etjo	FYME	MJO	Mount Etjo Airport
Namutoni	FYNA	NNI	Namutoni Airport
Okaukuejo	FYOO	OKF	Okaukuejo Airport
Omega	FYOE	OMG	Omega Airport
Ondangwa	FYOA	OND	**Andimba Toivo ya Toivo Airport**
Opuwo	FYOP	OPW	Opuwo Airport
Oranjemund	FYOG	OMD	**Oranjemund Airport**
Oshakati	FYOS	OHI	Oshakati Airport
Otjiwarongo	FYOW	OTJ	Otjiwarongo Airport
Outjo	FYOJ		Outjo Airport
Ruacana	FYRC		Ruacana Airport
Rundu	FYRU	NDU	**Rundu Airport**
Swakopmund	FYSM	SWP	Swakopmund Airport
Tsumeb	FYTM	TSB	Tsumeb Airport
Tsumkwe	FYTK		Tsumkwe Airport
Walvis Bay	FYWB	WVB	**Walvis Bay Airport**
Windhoek	FYWE	ERS	**Eros Airport**
Windhoek	FYWH	WDH	**Windhoek Hosea Kutako International Airport**

== See also ==
- Transport in Namibia
- List of airports by ICAO code: F#FY – Namibia
- Wikipedia: WikiProject Aviation/Airline destination lists: Africa#Namibia
