= Karasburg Airport =

Airport in Namibia

- IATA: KAS; ICAO: FYKB

Summary
- Airport type: Public
- Serves: Karasburg
- Elevation AMSL: 3,265 ft / 995 m
- Coordinates: 28°02′00″S 18°44′00″E

Map
- Location of the airport in Namibia

Runways
| Direction | Length | | Surface |
| Direction | m | ft | Surface |
|---|---|---|---|
| 05/23 | 1,500 | 4,921 | Unpaved |
| 17/35 | 838 | 2,749 | Unpaved |
- Source: Google Maps GCM

Karasburg Airport (IATA: KAS, ICAO: FYKB) is an airport serving the town of Karasburg in ǁKaras Region, Namibia. The runways are 1 kilometre (0.62 mi) southwest of the town.

== See also ==
- List of airports in Namibia
- Transport in Namibia
