= Bethanien Airport =

Airport in Namibia

- IATA: none; ICAO: FYBC

Summary
- Airport type: Public
- Serves: Bethanien
- Elevation AMSL: 3,500 ft / 1,067 m
- Coordinates: 26°32′45″S 17°10′55″E

Map
- Location of the airport in Namibia

Runways
Direction	Length		Surface
Direction	m	ft	Surface
18/36	1,272	4,173	Unpaved
- Sources: Google Maps GCM

Bethanien Airport (ICAO: FYBC) is an airport serving the town of Bethanien, Namibia. The runway is 5 kilometres (3.1 mi) southeast of the town, paralleling the C14 road.

== See also ==
- List of airports in Namibia
- Transport in Namibia
