= Mariental Airport =

Airport in Namibia

- IATA: none; ICAO: FYML

Summary
- Airport type: Public
- Serves: Mariental
- Elevation AMSL: 3,650 ft / 1,113 m
- Coordinates: 24°36′20″S 17°55′30″E

Map
- Location of the airport in Namibia

Runways
Direction	Length		Surface
Direction	m	ft	Surface
19/01	2,000	6,562	Asphalt
30/12	1,405	4,610	Gravel
- Source: Google Maps

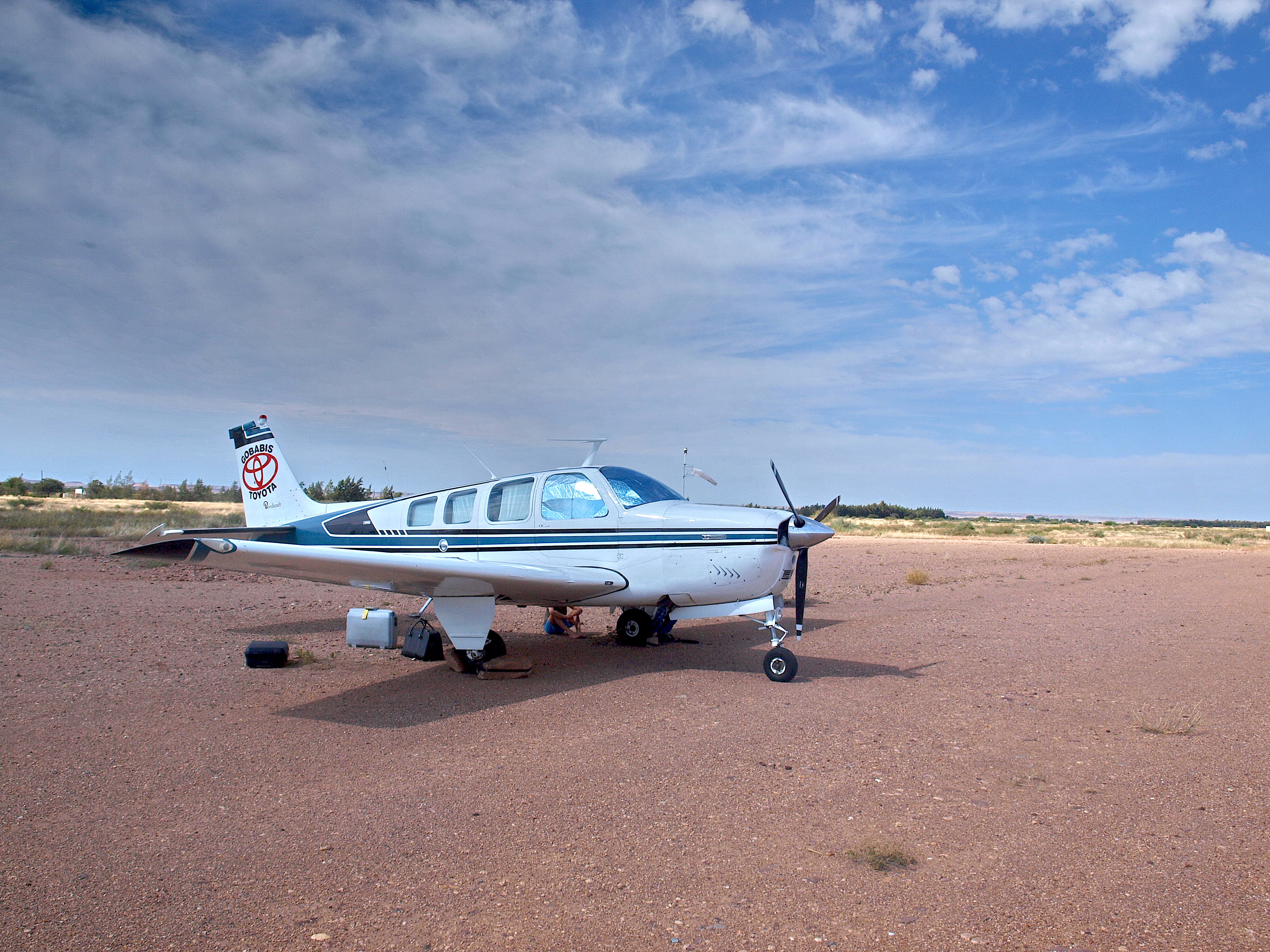
Mariental aerodrome with windsock

Mariental Airport (ICAO: FYML) is an airport serving the town of Mariental, in the Hardap Region of Namibia.

== See also ==
- List of airports in Namibia
- Transport in Namibia
