= Eenhana Airport =

Airport in Ohangwena, Namibia

- IATA: none; ICAO: FYEN

Summary
- Serves: Eenhana, Namibia
- Elevation AMSL: 3,660 ft / 1,116 m
- Coordinates: 17°28′59″S 16°19′19″E

Map

Runways
Direction	Length		Surface
Direction	m	ft	Surface
09/27	1,748	5,735	Asphalt
- Sources: World Aero Data Google Maps GCM

Eenhana Airport (ICAO: FYEN) is an airport serving Eenhana, in the Ohangwena Region of Namibia.

== See also ==
- List of airports in Namibia
- Transport in Namibia
