= Gobabis Airport =

Airport in Namibia

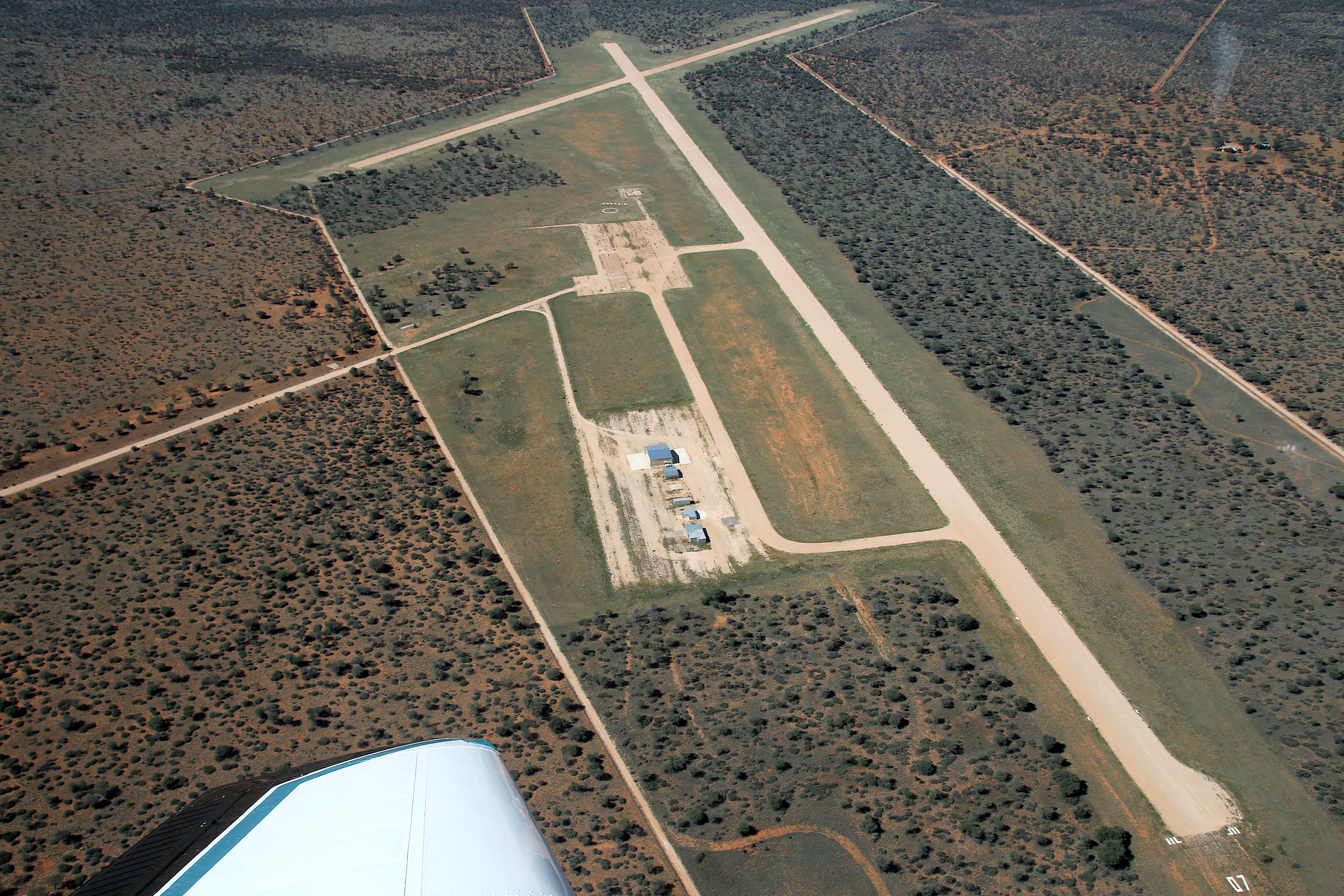
- IATA: GOG; ICAO: FYGB

Summary
- Airport type: Public
- Serves: Gobabis Namibia
- Elevation AMSL: 4,729 ft / 1,441 m
- Coordinates: 22°30′20″S 018°58′30″E

Map
- Location of the airport in Namibia

Runways
Direction	Length		Surface
Direction	m	ft	Surface
07/25	2,265	7,431	Gravel
11/29	1,605	5,266	Gravel
- Sources: Google Maps GCM

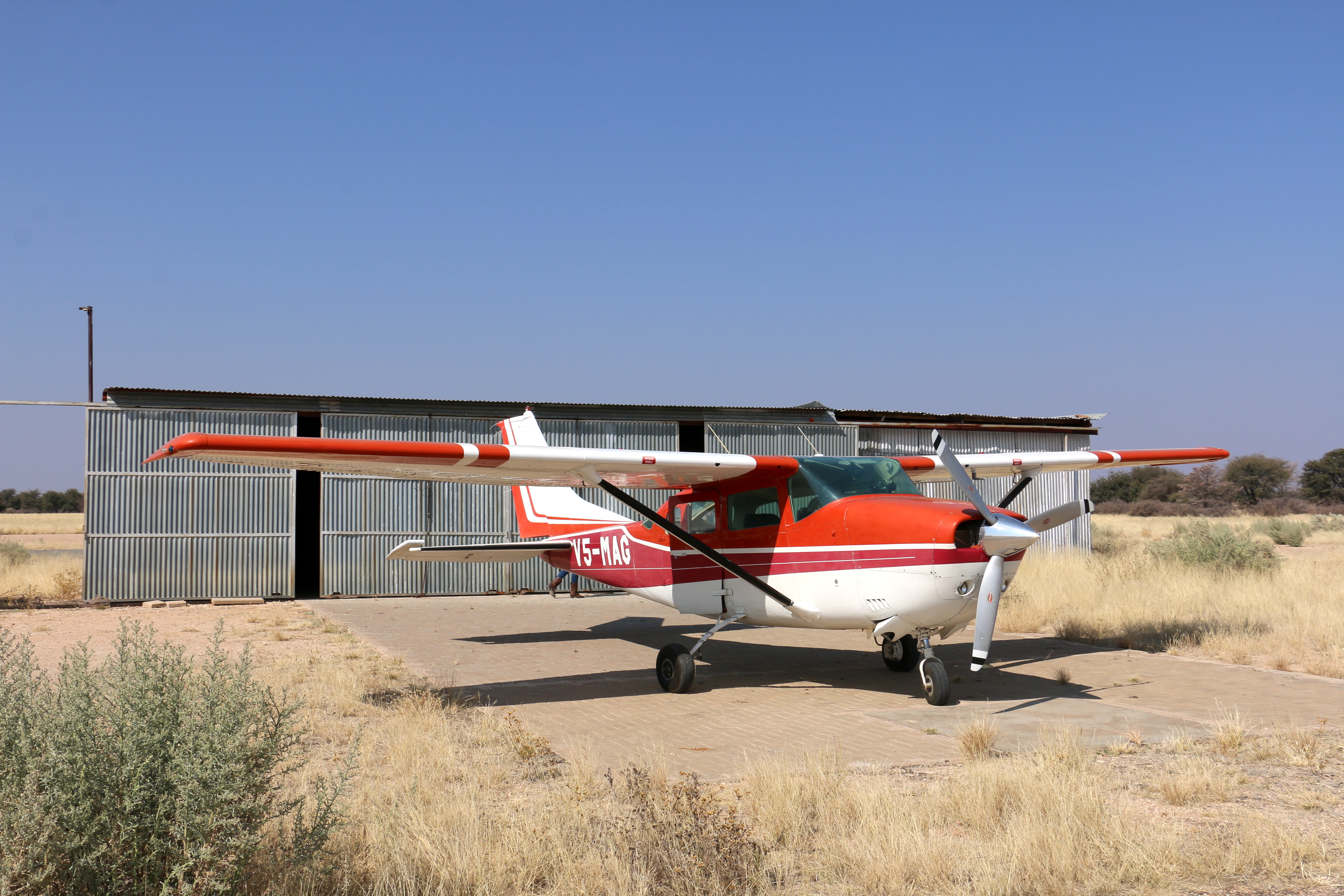
A Cessna 206 at Gobabis Airport

Gobabis Airport (IATA: GOG, ICAO: FYGB) is an airport serving the town of Gobabis, Namibia. The airport's elevation is 4,729 feet (1,441 m) a.m.s.l..

The length of runway 07/25 is 2,265 metres (7,431 ft) and runway 11/29 measures 1,605 metres (5,266 ft). Both are gravel runways. Customs and Immigration are available on request.

The airport is among the designated ports of entry into the country for holders of a valid Namibian e-visa.

== See also ==
- List of airports in Namibia
- Transport in Namibia
