= Union Airways =

- Union Airways PTY LTD
- Founded: 24 July 1929
- Commenced operations: 26 August 1929
- Ceased operations: 31 January 1934 (Rebranded Into South African Airways)
- Hubs: Cape Town
- Fleet size: 8 (maximum)
- Headquarters: Port Elizabeth; Durban
- Employees: 40

Union Airways of South Africa was the first South African commercial airline. It operated as an independent company for five years, from 1929 to 1934, before being taken over by the government as South African Airways.

== History ==
Union Airways were founded by Major Allister Miller, a World War I flying ace, who had recruited some 2000 South Africans for service in the Royal Air Force. The word "Union" referred to the official name of the country at that time: the Union of South Africa.

The company was financed by the Atlantic Refining Company, and supported by a small government subsidy. Its headquarters were initially at Fairview in Port Elizabeth, but they later moved to Stamford Hill in Durban. The corporate colours were red and yellow, and the logo was a shield depicting a stylised aircraft.

Union Airways was primarily a mail carrier, but from September 1929 it also transported passengers.

The fleet originally consisted of five DH60 Gipsy Moths. A Fokker Super Universal and two DH Puss Moths were added in 1930, but all three crashed during 1931, two of the crashes being fatal.

To replace them, Union Airways acquired some Junkers from South West African Airways, which was owned by the Junkers corporation in Germany. In 1932, UA and SWAA amalgamated, although they continued to operate under their individual names. Later that year, Irish playwright George Bernard Shaw celebrated his seventy-fifth birthday with a flight in one of the Junkers. In 1933, Union Airways placed a Junkers at the disposal of deputy prime minister General Jan Smuts for an election tour.

The South African government bought Union Airways in 1934, and renamed it South African Airways.

=== Routes ===
The operation began as an airmail delivery service, with a government contract to fly airmail between Cape Town and the major centres in South Africa. Mail was collected from the Union Castle steamships from Britain that docked at Cape Town harbour on Monday mornings and flown to Port Elizabeth by a single Gypsy Moth. At Port Elizabeth two more Gipsy Moths were waiting to continue the service, one to fly mail to Bloemfontein and Johannesburg and the other to East London and Durban. On 29 August the first return service was operated, reaching Cape Town in time for the departing UK-bound steamship.

Union Airways carried its first passenger from Cape Town to East London on 3 September 1929. The airline also undertook the carriage of sick persons on mercy flights (unscheduled; route and schedule as required).

As both mail and passenger traffic increased Miller bought a Fokker Super Universal single engine aircraft that could carry six passengers; this aircraft entered service on 29 May 1930. The next aircraft type to enter service with Union Airways were two de Havilland DH 80A Puss Moths. These aircraft could carry two passengers in an enclosed cabin and replaced some of the Gypsy Moths that had been sold or written off.

One Puss Moth crashed near Sir Lowry's Pass, with the pilot and two passengers killed. The Fokker Super Universal crashed at Kayser's Beach near East London on 31 December 1931 (no injuries).

Imperial Airways began operating a scheduled service from England to South Africa on 20 February 1932. At first only airmail was carried, passengers were later carried and the trip took 11 days.

=== Later developments ===
Union Airways was not profitable during its operations. Junkers South Africa Pty (Ltd) who owned and operated South West African Airways, bought a substantial share in Union Airways. An all-metal Junkers F13 was chartered from SWA Airways and was soon operating in place of the wrecked Fokker. More Junkers aircraft followed in the form of F13 and W34 aircraft and later a Junkers A50 also joined the fleet. Imperial's airmail service from Britain to Cape Town was routed via Rand Airport and Kimberley and this made the Union Airways airmail service from Cape Town to Johannesburg unnecessary. The carriage of airmail from Durban to Johannesburg and Durban to Cape Town was contracted to Union Airways. Passenger growth on the Durban – Johannesburg service grew steadily culminating in a daily flight. This compelled the airline to move their base from Port Elizabeth to Durban. Major Miller also placed an order for 3 Junkers Ju 52/3m aircraft; an all-metal airliner with three engines which could carry up to 18 passengers.

When one of the Junkers W34 aircraft crashed in bad weather near the town of Eshowe in late 1933, two crew and three passengers were killed (one passenger survived). This was a major blow to the airline and forced Miller to approach the South African government to take over the operation.

The South African government took over the assets and liabilities of Union Airways on 1 February 1934. This included 40 staff members and three Junkers F13s, one DH60 Gypsy Moth, one DH80A Puss Moth and a leased Junkers F13 and Junkers A50. The airline was named South African Airways and fell under the control of the South African Railways and Harbours administration. SAA honoured the order for the three Junkers Ju 52/3m aircraft.
