= Kamanjab Airport =

Airport in Kunene, Namibia

- IATA: none; ICAO: FYKJ

Summary
- Airport type: Public
- Serves: Kamanjab
- Elevation AMSL: 4,270 ft (1,300 m)
- Coordinates: 19°31′15″S 14°49′25″E

Map
- Location of the airport in Namibia

Runways
Direction	Length		Surface
Direction	m	ft	Surface
09/27	1,832	6,010	Unpaved
18/36	1,375	4,511	Unpaved
- Source: Google Maps GCM

Kamanjab Airport (ICAO: FYKJ) is an airport serving the village of Kamanjab in the Kunene Region of Namibia. The runways are 11 kilometres (6.8 mi) north of the settlement.

== See also ==
- List of airports in Namibia
- Transport in Namibia
