= Omega Airport =

Airport in Namibia

- IATA: OMG; ICAO: FYOE

Summary
- Serves: Omega
- Elevation AMSL: 3,350 ft / 1,021 m
- Coordinates: 18°01′45″S 22°11′20″E

Map
- Location of the airport in Namibia

Runways
Direction	Length		Surface
Direction	m	ft	Surface
07/25	1,694	5,558	Asphalt
- Source: Google Maps GCM

Omega Airport (IATA: OMG, ICAO: FYOE) is a former military airport serving the village of Omega in the Kavango East Region of Namibia.

== See also ==
- List of airports in Namibia
- Transport in Namibia
