= Tsumkwe Airport =

Airport in Namibia

- IATA: none; ICAO: FYTK

Summary
- Airport type: Public
- Serves: Tsumkwe
- Elevation AMSL: 3,780 ft / 1,152 m
- Coordinates: 19°35′00″S 20°27′00″E

Map
- Location of the airport in Namibia

Runways
Direction	Length		Surface
Direction	m	ft	Surface
09/27	1,800	5,905	Gravel
18/36	1,358	4,455	Gravel
- Source: Google Maps GCM

Tsumkwe Airport (ICAO: FYTK) is a public airport serving the village of Tsumkwe in Otjozondjupa Region, in northeastern Namibia.

== See also ==
- List of airports in Namibia
- Transport in Namibia
