= Namibia Air =

Proposed airline of Namibia

- Parent company: Government of Namibia

Namibia Air (Pty) Ltd, trading as Namibia Air, is the proposed flag carrier of Namibia, currently being established by the Government of Namibia. It is intended to serve as the nation's new state-owned airline, replacing the former flag carrier, Air Namibia, which ceased operations and was liquidated in 2021.

== History ==
The decision to form a new national airline follows the voluntary liquidation of Air Namibia (Pty) Ltd in February 2021. Air Namibia was shut down after decades of operating at a loss and was deemed a significant financial burden on the state, having accumulated liabilities of nearly N$5.4 billion and receiving state bailouts totaling approximately N$8 billion (US$453 million) over its operating history. The government cited "serious mismanagement" and "a lack of accountability" as the primary reasons for the failure of the previous carrier.

In late 2024, the Namibian Cabinet officially approved the name Namibia Air (Pty) Ltd for the new national carrier. The government's decision explicitly rules out the revival of the old Air Namibia brand, emphasizing that the new entity must be built from the ground up on sound commercial principles and robust corporate governance to prevent past mistakes.
