= Mount Etjo Airport =

Airport in Otjozondjupa, Namibia

- IATA: MJO; ICAO: FYME

Summary
- Airport type: Public
- Serves: Mount Etjo Safari Lodge
- Elevation AMSL: 5,000 ft / 1,542 m
- Coordinates: 21°01′23″S 16°27′10″E

Map
- Location of the airport in Namibia

Runways
Direction	Length		Surface
Direction	ft	m	Surface
08/26	4,490	1,368	Unpaved
- Source: Google Maps

Mount Etjo Airport (IATA: MJO, ICAO: FYME) is an airport serving Mount Etjo Safari Lodge and the Okonjati Game Reserve in Namibia.

== See also ==
- List of airports in Namibia
- Transport in Namibia
