= Korean Air Flight 803 =

1989 aviation accident

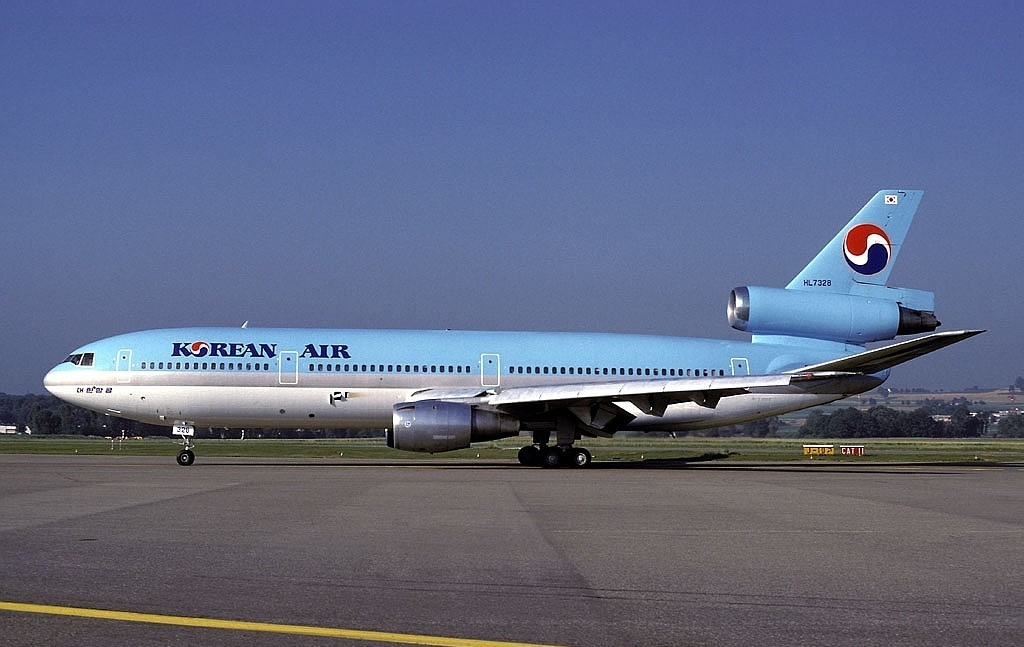
- HL7328, the aircraft involved in the accident, pictured in 1986

Accident
- Date: 27 July 1989
- Summary: Pilot error in low visibility leading to controlled flight into terrain
- Site: Near Tripoli International Airport, Tripoli, Libya; 32°39′53″N 13°11′36″E
- Total fatalities: 80
- Total injuries: 139

Aircraft
- Aircraft type: McDonnell Douglas DC-10-30
- Operator: Korean Air
- IATA flight No.: KE803
- ICAO flight No.: KAL803
- Call sign: KOREAN AIR 803
- Registration: HL7328
- Flight origin: Gimpo International Airport, Seoul, South Korea
- 1st stopover: Don Mueang International Airport, Bangkok, Thailand
- Last stopover: King Abdulaziz International Airport, Jeddah, Saudi Arabia
- Destination: Tripoli International Airport, Tripoli, Libya
- Occupants: 199
- Passengers: 181
- Crew: 18
- Fatalities: 74
- Injuries: 125
- Survivors: 125

Ground casualties
- Ground fatalities: 6
- Ground injuries: 14

Korean Air Flight 803 was a scheduled international passenger flight operated by Korean Air from Seoul to Tripoli via Bangkok and Jeddah. On 27 July 1989, the McDonnell Douglas DC-10 operating the flight crashed while attempting to land in Tripoli, Libya. Out of the 199 passengers and crew onboard, 74 people were killed, and an additional six people on the ground were also killed. The accident was the deadliest aviation disaster to occur in Libya at the time. It remains the third-deadliest accident in Libya, after Libyan Arab Airlines Flight 1103 in 1992 with 159 fatalities, and Afriqiyah Airways Flight 771 in 2009 with 103 fatalities.

== Background ==
=== Aircraft ===
The aircraft involved was a McDonnell Douglas DC-10-30 (serial number 47887 and line number 125). It was built in 1973 and first flew on 17 September. During the test period, the aircraft was registered as N54634. The aircraft was powered by three General Electric CF6-50C2 turbofan engines. In 1974, the aircraft was sold to Air Siam, and it was registered in Thailand as HS-VGE on 25 November. In 1977, the airliner was sold to Korean Air (known at the time as Korean Air Lines), and received the Korean registration HL7328 on 25 February 1977. The aircraft had 49,025 flight hours and 11,440 take-off and landing cycles.

=== Crew ===
The captain was Kim Ho-jung (54), the first officer was Choi Jae-hong (57), and the flight engineer was Hyun Gyu-hwan (53).

== Accident ==
Flight 803 was a scheduled international passenger service from Seoul, South Korea to Tripoli, Libya with intermediate stops in Bangkok, Thailand and Jeddah, Saudi Arabia. There were a total of 18 crew members and 181 passengers, mostly South Korean workers, who were returning to Libya for construction work after their home leave. The weather at the time of the accident consisted of heavy fog and visibility was between 100 and 800 feet (30 and 244 m). Despite the circumstances, the flight crew decided to continue the approach. At 07:05, while on approach to runway 27, the DC-10 dropped below the glide path, struck two buildings, broke into three sections, and burst into flames. 90% of the on-board fatalities were attributed to the fire, with the remaining 10% attributed to impact shock The accident site was in an orchard 1.5 miles (2.4 km; 1.3 nmi) short of runway 27. 80 people were killed in the accident: 74 occupants of the aircraft (70 passengers and four crew members) and six people on the ground.

There were 189 South Koreans, seven Libyans, and three Japanese nationals on board Flight 803. Two South Korean companies, Daewoo and Donga Construction Co, had multiple South Korean employees on board.

Nationality	Passengers	Crew	Total
South Korea	171	18	189
Libya	7	0	7
Japan	3	0	3
Total	181	18	199

== Aftermath ==
After the accident, Flight 803's captain Kim Ho-jung was quoted as saying - "The airport was shrouded in dense fog and visibility was poor when I approached. I lost contact with the control tower for 15 minutes before the crash." Libya's official news agency, JANA, reported that one hour earlier, a Soviet aircraft had diverted to Malta rather than land in the fog. Additionally, the instrument landing system at Tripoli International Airport was inoperable at the time of the accident.

A Libyan court found the captain, first officer and flight engineer guilty of neglect in December 1990. They were given prison sentences of two years, eighteen months, and one year respectively. In the case of the first officer the sentence was suspended.

== Investigation ==
At the direction of the Libyan authorities, French specialists were invited to investigate the causes of the accident. The flight recorders were sent to France. American representatives, including the aircraft manufacturer, were not allowed into Libya at the time.

=== Cause ===
The cause of the accident was determined to be a combination of multiple factors. Due to a lack of proper sleep, much of the crew failed to recognize safety hazards and follow Captain instructions. The First-Officer and Flight-Engineer both failed to notice and alert the Captain to the ground level and descent speed. Additionally, the Ground Proximity Warning System (GPWS) failed to maintain warnings during the descent. The failure of GPWS was further compounded by a lack of proper crew training on the equipped system. These factors combined led to a rapid descent below decision height without runway environment light visible, and an eventual ground collision.
