= Outjo Airport =

Airport in Namibia

- IATA: none; ICAO: FYOJ

Summary
- Airport type: Public
- Serves: Outjo
- Elevation AMSL: 4,344 ft / 1,324 m
- Coordinates: 20°04′40″S 16°07′30″E

Map
- Location of the airport in Namibia

Runways
Direction	Length		Surface
Direction	m	ft	Surface
15/33	1,788	5,866	Gravel
06/24	1,244	4,081	Gravel
- Source: Google Maps GCM

Outjo Airport (ICAO: FYOJ) is an airport serving Outjo, in the Kunene Region of Namibia.

== See also ==
- List of airports in Namibia
- Transport in Namibia
