= Keetmanshoop Airport =

Airport in Namibia

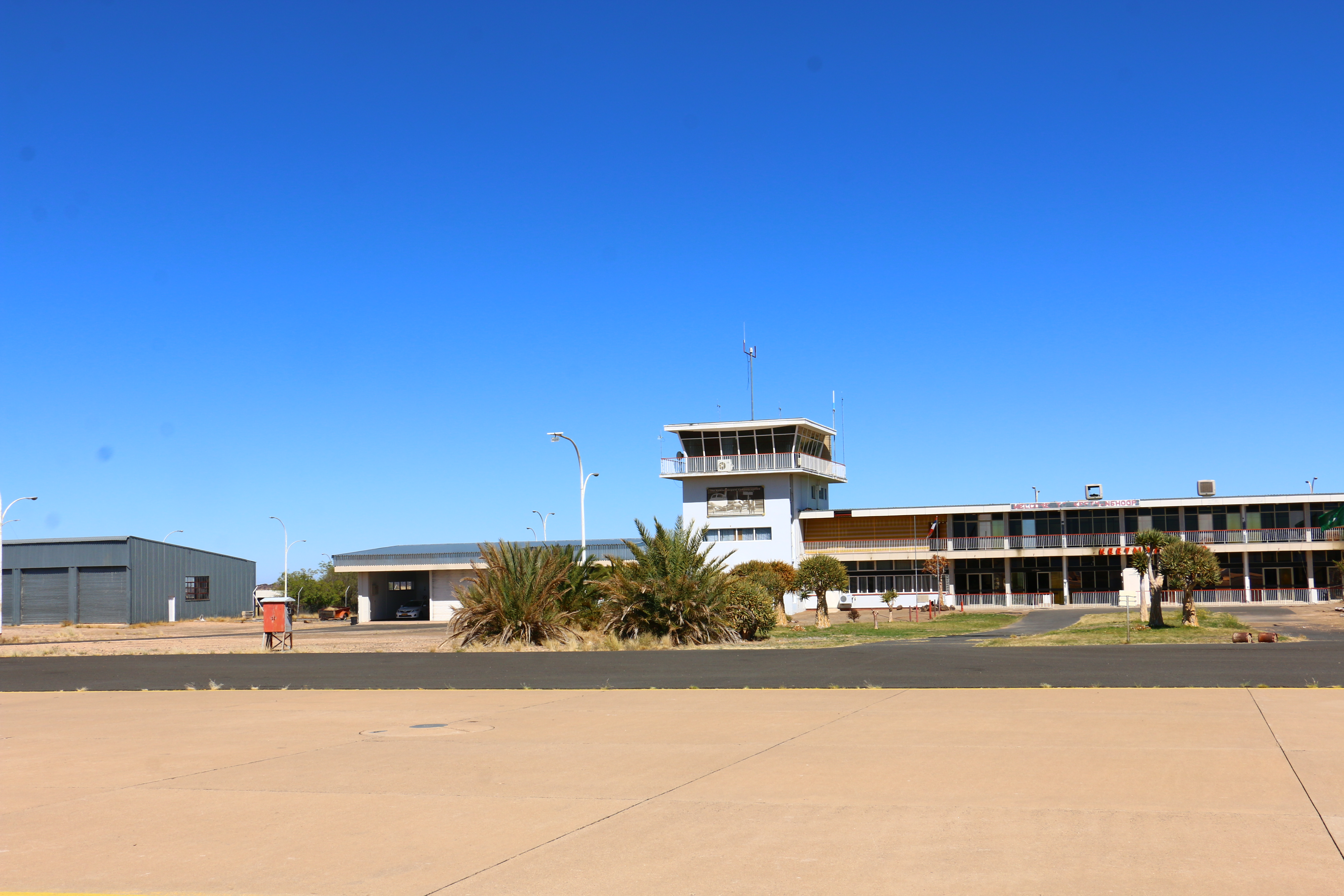
- IATA: KMP; ICAO: FYKT

Summary
- Airport type: Public
- Owner/Operator: Namibia Airports Co.
- Serves: Keetmanshoop, Namibia
- Elevation AMSL: 3,506 ft (1,069 m)
- Coordinates: 26°32′15″S 18°06′40″E

Map
- Location of the airport in Namibia

Runways
Direction	Length		Surface
Direction	m	ft	Surface
04/22	2,316	7,598	Asphalt
18/36	1,434	4,705	Gravel
- Sources: Namibia Airports Co. WAD GCM

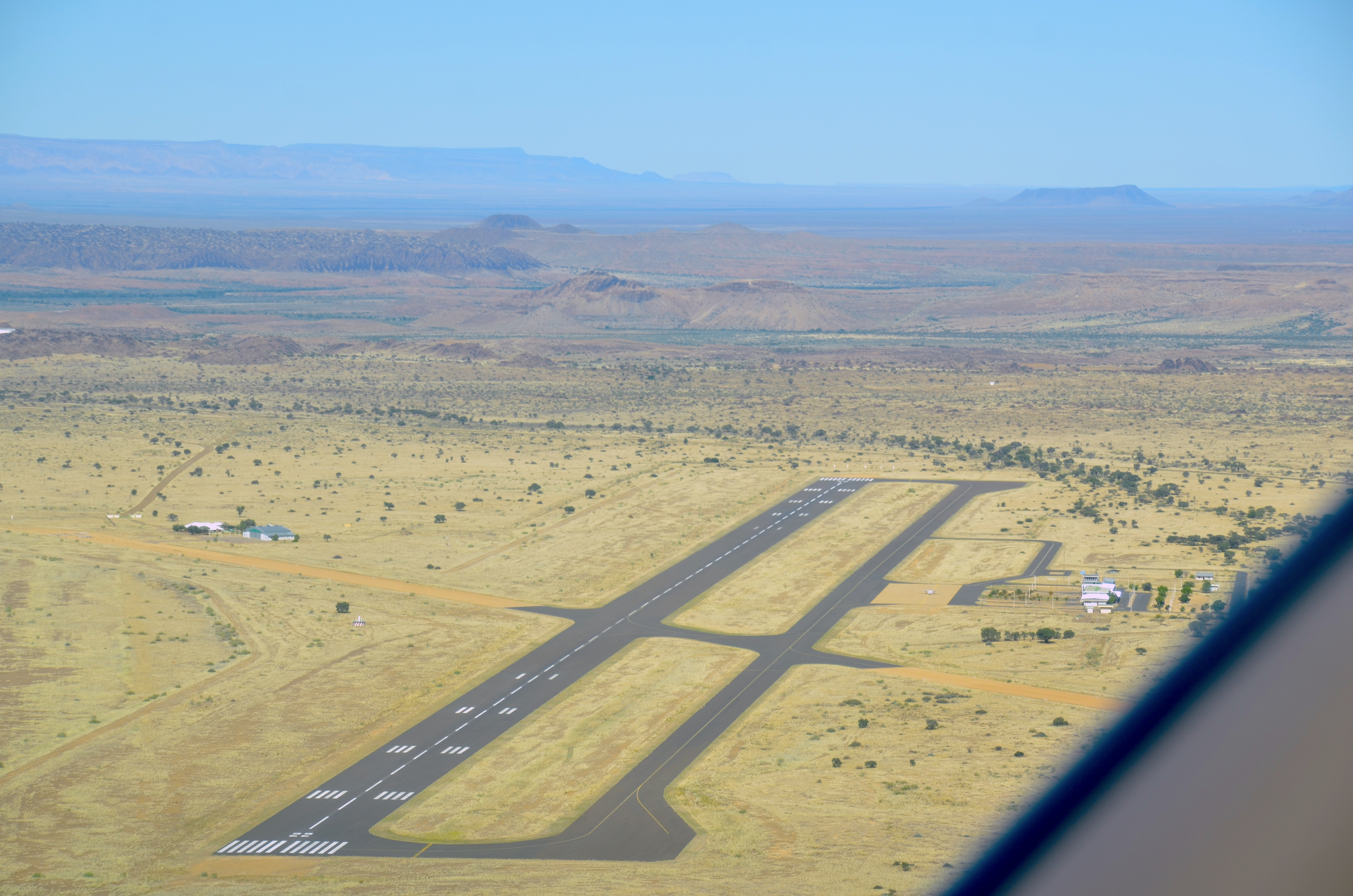
Aerial view of Runways 04/22 and 18/36

Keetmanshoop Airport (IATA: KMP, ICAO: FYKT) is an airport serving Keetmanshoop, a town in the ǁKaras Region to the south of Namibia. The airport is located about 5 km (3 mi) northwest of the town. It has customs and immigration services and is home to the Namibia Aviation Training Academy (NATA).

Keetmanshoop Airport handled 541 passengers in 2025. As all other regional airports in Namibia, it operates at a loss.

== See also ==
- List of airports in Namibia
- Transport in Namibia
