= Kalahari Tea =

Tea company

- Company type: Private
- Industry: Beverage
- Founded: 1999
- Headquarters: Atlanta, Georgia
- Products: Tea

Kalahari Tea imports, distributes, and sells a variety of specialty teas via its web site. Founded by Ned Fitch and David Abrahams, the company focused in particular on South African Rooibos or red tea, which it sold in Giant Eagle and GNC stores. Additional lines included its ChocoLatte green tea, citrus-flavored oolong teas, all of which were carried in Publix grocery stores.
