= Omutumwa =

Omutumwa (Oshiwambo: "messenger") is a bi-weekly Ovambo-language newspaper based in Windhoek, Namibia. The paper ran its first edition on 29 September 2010 and has a print run of 5,000. The newspaper is published by Victor Angula Franciscus, who formerly worked at Katutura Community Radio.
