= Bidvest Namibia =

Bidvest Namibia is a business group based in Windhoek, Namibia. In 1989 under the name Crown National Namibia (Proprietary) Limited Established since 2009 is a fully independent company. The initial public offering took place on 26 Namibia October 2009. Originally it was part of the South African Bidvest Group.

It is a broadly held volume of 600 million Namibian dollars, the third largest company on Namibian Stock Exchange.

Bidvest Namibia is divided into 2 sectors. BidCom and BidFish. BidCom covers the commercial side of Bidvest in Namibia, while BidFish covers all the fishing and fish processing, namely Namsov Namibia and United Fishing Enterprises.
