= Tsumeb Airport =

Airport in Tsumeb, Oshikoto, Namibia

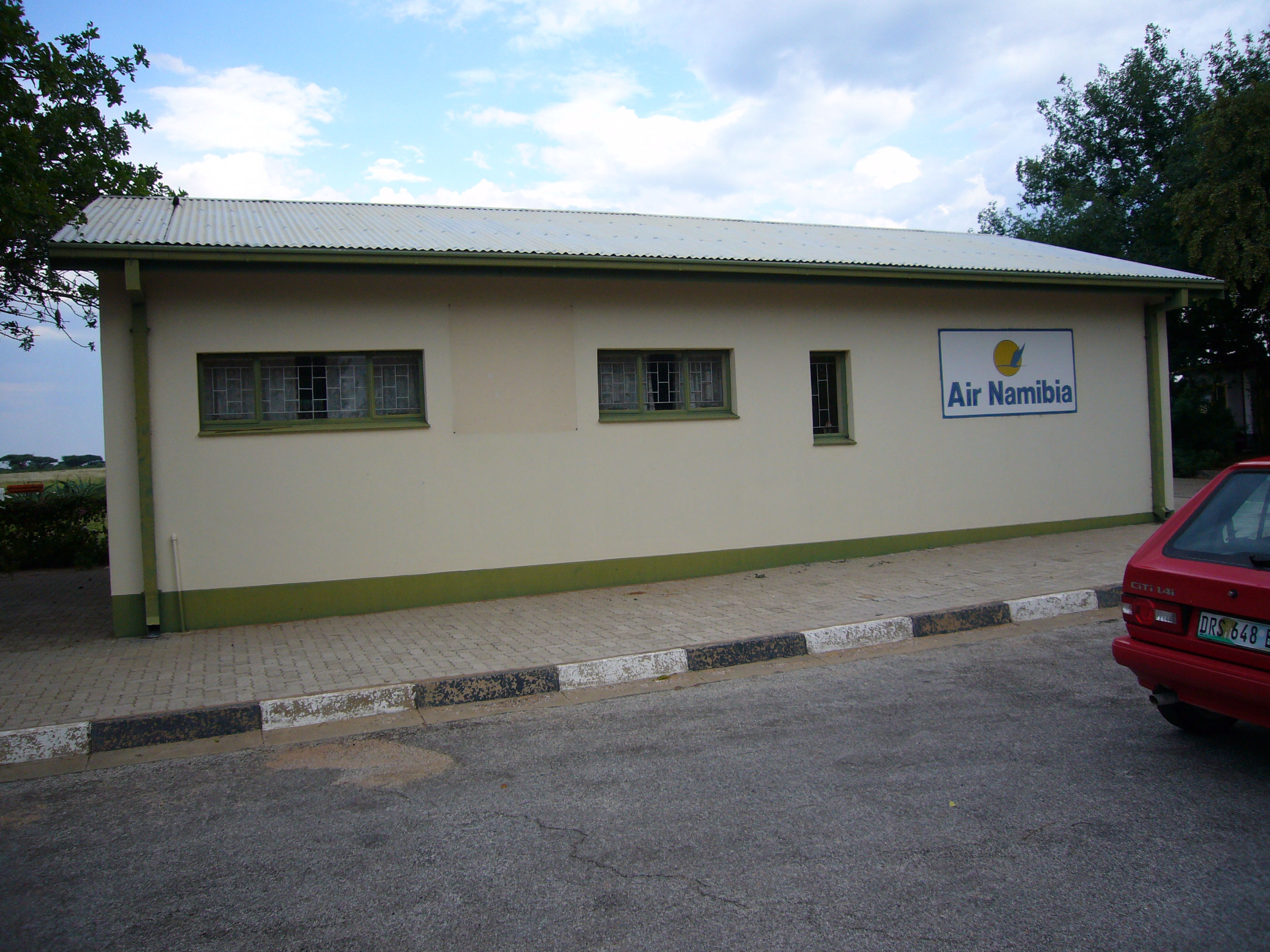
- IATA: TSB; ICAO: FYTM

Summary
- Airport type: Public
- Location: Tsumeb, Namibia
- Elevation AMSL: 4,353 ft (1,327 m)
- Coordinates: 19°15′40″S 17°43′50″E

Map
- Location of airport in Namibia

Runways
Direction	Length		Surface
Direction	m	ft	Surface
12/30	1,550	5,085	Asphalt
- Source: DAFIF GCM Google Earth

Tsumeb Airport (IATA: TSB, ICAO: FYTM) is a public airport serving Tsumeb, a town in the Oshikoto Region of northern Namibia. The airport is just east of the town. Tsumeb is the location of a former mining operation and is the closest town to the Etosha National Park.

The Tsumeb non-directional beacon (Ident: TM) is located on the field.

== See also ==
- List of airports in Namibia
- Transport in Namibia
