= Halali Airport =

Airport in Namibia

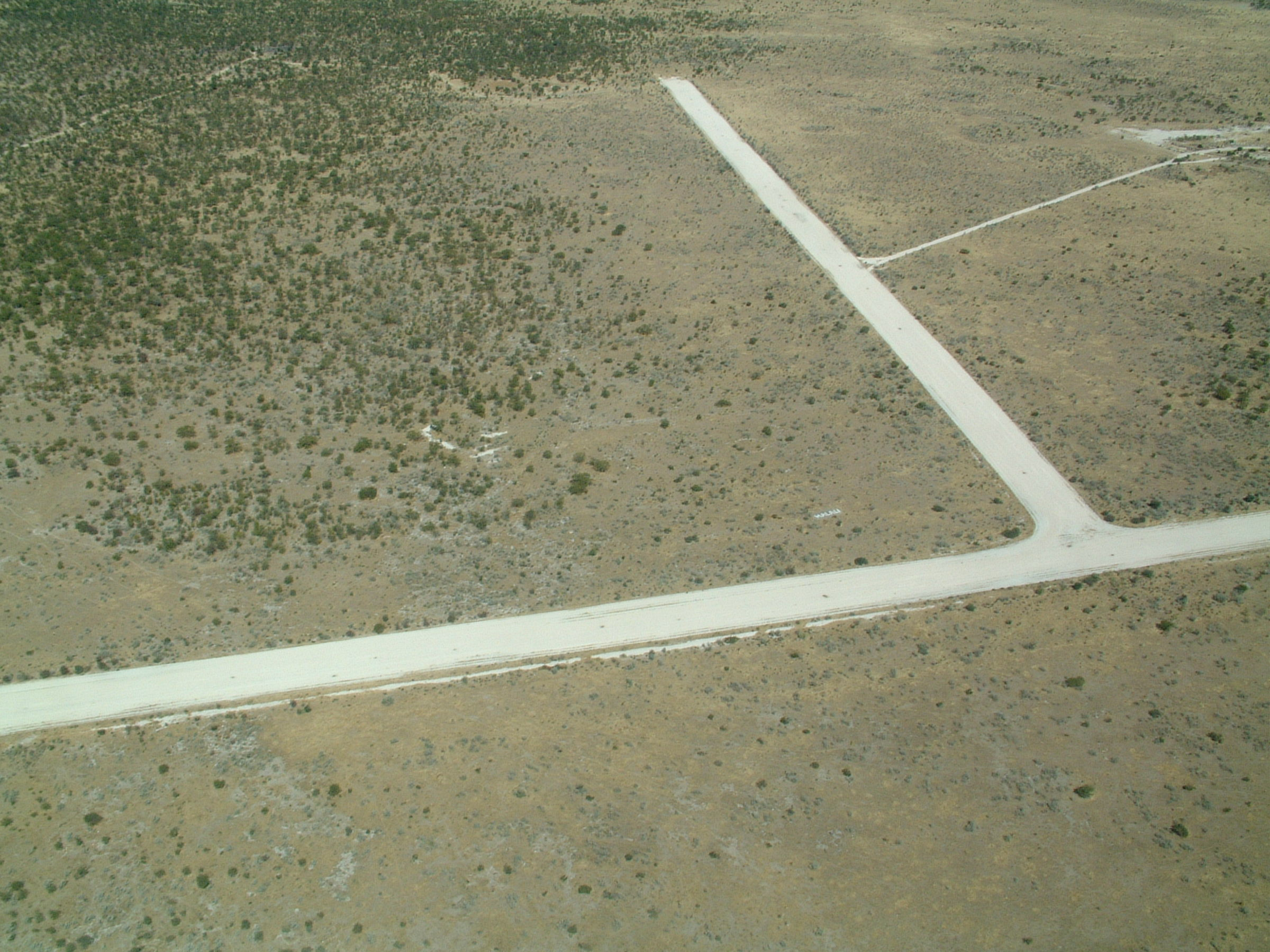
- Aerial view of Halali Airport in 2002
- IATA: HAL; ICAO: FYHI

Summary
- Airport type: Public
- Serves: Halali
- Elevation AMSL: 3,640 ft / 1,109 m
- Coordinates: 19°01′50″S 16°27′30″E

Map
- Location of the airport in Namibia

Runways
Direction	Length		Surface
Direction	m	ft	Surface
05/23	1,120	3,675	Gravel
13/31	1,160	3,806	Gravel
- Source: Google Maps GCM

Halali Airport (IATA: HAL, ICAO: FYHI) is a small airport in the Oshikoto Region of Namibia.

It serves the resort of Halali, which is in the Etosha National Park, and has elevated viewing platforms for observing native wildlife like elephants, rhinoceros, and leopards.

== See also ==
- List of airports in Namibia
- Transport in Namibia
