= Kalahari Express Airlines =

Namibian airline, 1997–2000

IATA	ICAO	Call sign
—	KEA	Kalahari
- Founded: 1998
- Commenced operations: 1999
- Ceased operations: 2001
- Operating bases: Eros Airport
- Fleet size: 2 Fokker F28 Fellowship
- Headquarters: Windhoek, Namibia

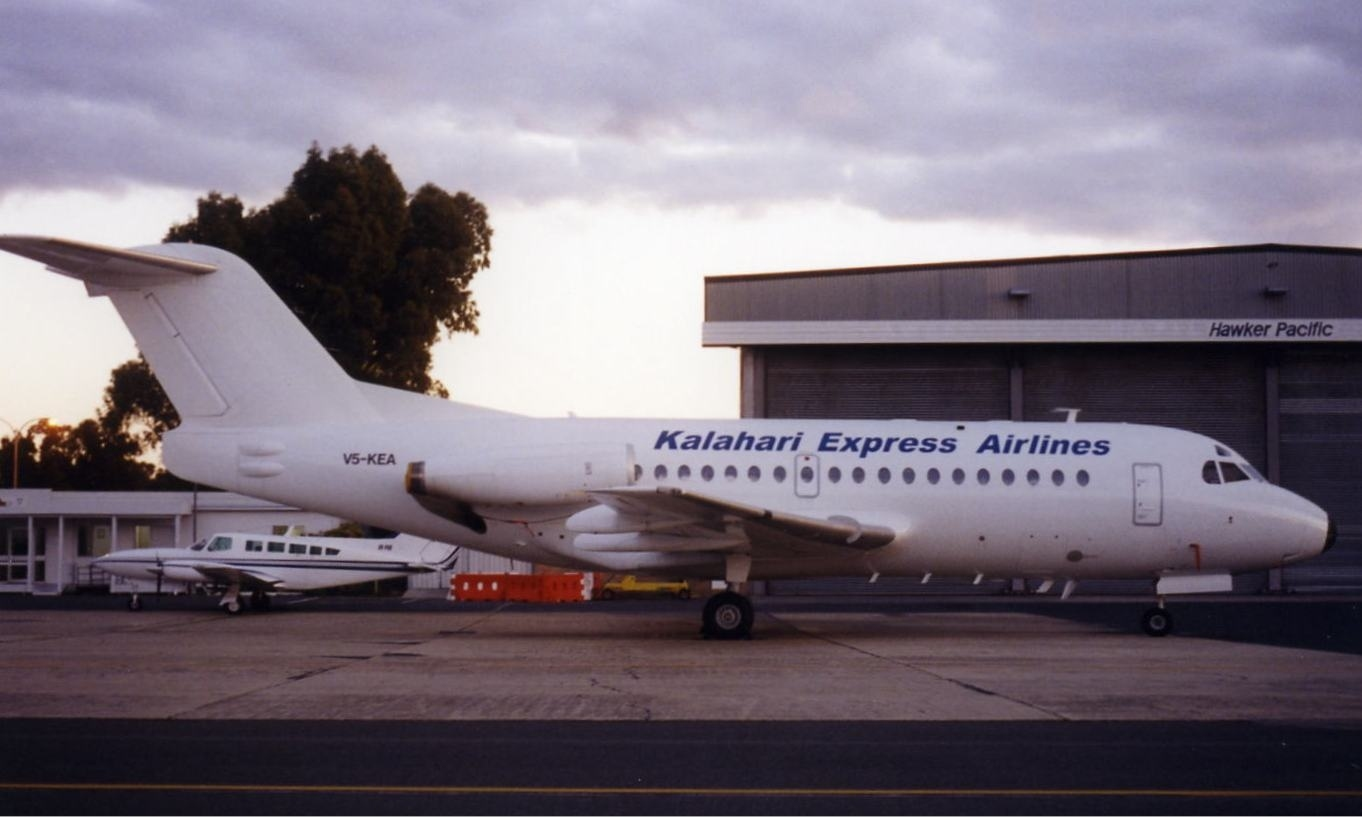
Kalahari Express Fokker F28 at Perth Airport (late 1990s)

Kalahari Express Airlines (KEA) was an airline based in Windhoek, Namibia. It was formed in 1998, operating from Eros Airport. KEA merged with Air Namibia in 2001.

== Code data ==
- ICAO Code: KEA (not current)
- Callsign: KALAHARI (not current)

== History ==
The airline was set to start service in 1997, though as of 1998, service had not yet started. The airline had difficulty in obtaining loans to purchase two Fokker F28-Mark 3000 from Australia. Destinations to be served from Windhoek were Johannesburg and Cape Town.
