= Okaukuejo Airport =

Airport in Namibia

- IATA: OKF; ICAO: FYOO

Summary
- Airport type: Public
- Serves: Okaukuejo
- Elevation AMSL: 3,620 ft / 1,103 m
- Coordinates: 19°09′00″S 15°55′00″E

Map
- Location of the airport in Namibia

Runways
Direction	Length		Surface
Direction	m	ft	Surface
04/22	1,305	4,281	Dirt
08/26	1,400	4,593	Dirt
- Source: GCM Google Maps

Okaukuejo Airport (IATA: OKF, ICAO: FYOO) is an airport in the Oshana Region of Namibia, serving the Etosha National Park and its administrative center, Okaukuejo. The runways are 3 kilometres (1.9 mi) north of the village.

== See also ==
- List of airports in Namibia
- Transport in Namibia
