= South West African Airways =

Airline in South West Africa (now Namibia),1930–1935

IATA	ICAO	Call sign
-	-	-
- Commenced operations: 1930
- Ceased operations: 1935
- Parent company: Junkers Flugzeug und Motorenwerke AG
- Headquarters: Windhoek, South West Africa

South West African Airways (SWAA) was the first commercial air service in South West Africa (now Namibia). It operated from 1930 until 1935, when it was taken over by South African Airways.

== History ==
South African military forces occupied German South West Africa during World War I, and South Africa continued to administer the territory after the war, under a mandate from the League of Nations.

In 1930, the administration invited tenders for an air mail and passenger carrier service. The successful tenderer was the Junkers aircraft company in Germany, which then formed South West African Airways. Naturally, SWAA's fleet consisted of Junkers. The company was founded by F. Hoepfner, a German air ministry official. Regular flight services started in August 1931. The crew's chief pilot was the British aviator F.C.J. Fry.

The SWAA's red and white logo depicted three stylised aircraft within a circle.

SWAA flew passengers on routes in South West Africa, and into South Africa, and an air-mail service from Windhoek and Kimberley.

In 1932, SWAA amalgamated with Union Airways in South Africa, but continued to operate under its own name. In 1935, South African Airways, which had taken over Union Airways in 1934, bought out SWAA for 14,000 rands.

== Fleet ==
- 2 Junkers A50
- 1 Junkers F.13

== Bibliography ==
- Illsley, John W. (2003). In Southern Skies: A Pictorial History of Early Aviation in Southern Africa 1816-1940. Johannesburg, South Africa: Jonathan Ball Publishers. ISBN 978-1868421688.
- Larsson, Bjōrn; Kusrow, Daniel (September 22, 2014). "South West African Airways baggage label". airline timetable images.
