= Oshakati Airport =

Airport in Oshana, Namibia

- IATA: OHI; ICAO: FYOS

Summary
- Airport type: Public
- Serves: Oshakati
- Elevation AMSL: 3,600 ft / 1,097 m
- Coordinates: 17°47′50″S 15°42′00″E

Map
- Location of the airport in Namibia

Runways
Direction	Length		Surface
Direction	m	ft	Surface
16/34	1,620	5,315	Asphalt
- Source: GCM Google Maps

Oshakati Airport (IATA: OHI, ICAO: FYOS) was an airport serving Oshakati in the Oshana Region of Namibia.

== See also ==
- Transport in Namibia
- List of airports in Namibia
