= List of Douglas DC-4 variants =

DC-4
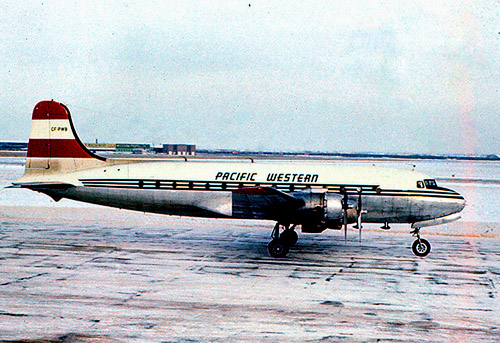
- Douglas DC-4 of Pacific Western Airlines in 1959

This is a list of civil and military variants of the Douglas DC-4:

== Civil variants ==
DC-4
Initial prototype. One built.
DC-4-1009
Postwar passenger model. This civil model could carry up to 88 passengers.
DC-4-1037
Postwar freight model.
DC-4A
Civilian model designation for the C-54 Skymaster.
DC-4M-1X North Star
The initial prototype that was later part of the TCA order.
DC-4M-2/3 North Star
Four-engined civil transport aircraft for Trans Canada Airlines, powered by four Rolls-Royce Merlin 622 piston engines. A total of 20 built for Trans-Canada Airlines. Also known as the North Star M2-3.

DC-4M-2/4 North Star
Four-engined civil transport aircraft for Trans Canada Airlines, powered by four Rolls-Royce Merlin 624 piston engines. Also known as the North Star M2-4.

DC-4M-2/4C North Star
DC-4M-2/4 North Star cargo conversions done between 1954-1961. Also known as the North Star M2-4C.

DC-4M-1 North Star Mk M1
Six aircraft operated by Trans Canada Airlines, on loan from the RCAF.
C-4 Argonaut
A total of 22 built for use by BOAC.

North Star C-4-1
Four aircraft identical to BOAC's Argonauts built to Canadian Pacific Airlines specifications. Also known as the Canadair Four
North Star C-4-1C
North Star C-4-1s converted into freight or cargo aircraft.

C-5 North Star
One RCAF VIP transport version powered by four Pratt & Whitney R-2800 radial piston engines.
CL-2
Canadair model number for the DC-4M-1X, DC-4M-2/3, DC-4M-2/4 and C-54GM North Star.
CL-4
Canadair model number for the C-4 Argonaut and C-4-1 Canadair Four.
CL-5
Canadair model number for the sole C-5 North Star.
Aviation Traders Carvair
Starting in 1959, 21 DC-4s and C-54s found new life as ATL-98 Carvairs. The Carvair was designed to carry 22 passengers and five automobiles. This was accomplished by extending the fuselage, moving the cockpit above the fuselage, adding a side-opening nose, and enlarging the vertical stabilizer to offset the larger forward fuselage. These aircraft served as flying ferries well into the 1970s, and two are still airworthy as of March 2008 - one each in Texas and South Africa.
DC-4 Swingtail
A C-54B (c/n 10452) converted to a swing tail by Sabena for Air Congo. It flew for Air Congo and later Air Zaire from 1966 to 1976 and then sold to Zaire Air Service in 1976 and flew until 1984. Sold to Kinair Cargo and flew until it crashed in 1988.

== Military variants ==
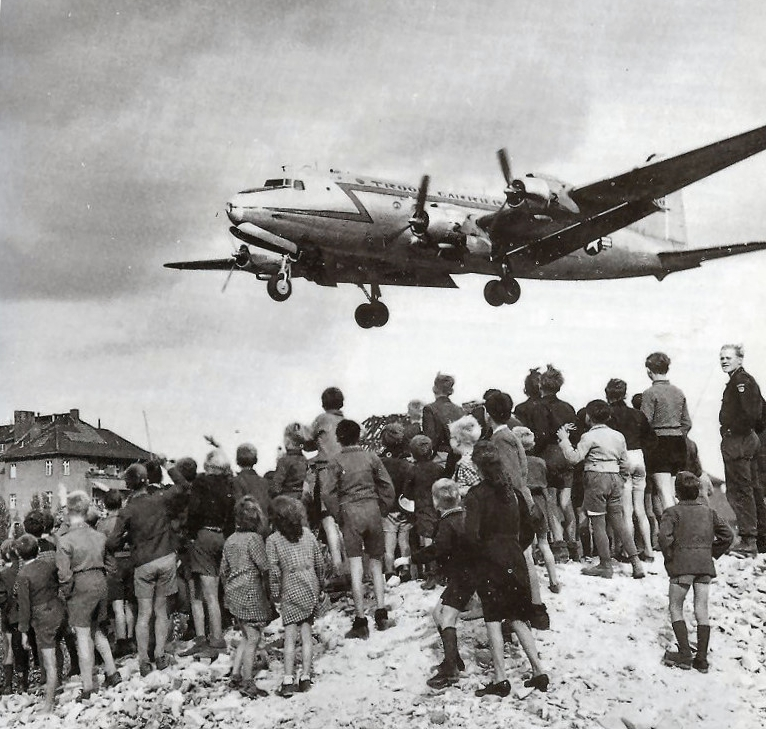
Berliners watching a C-54 land at Tempelhof Airport (1948).

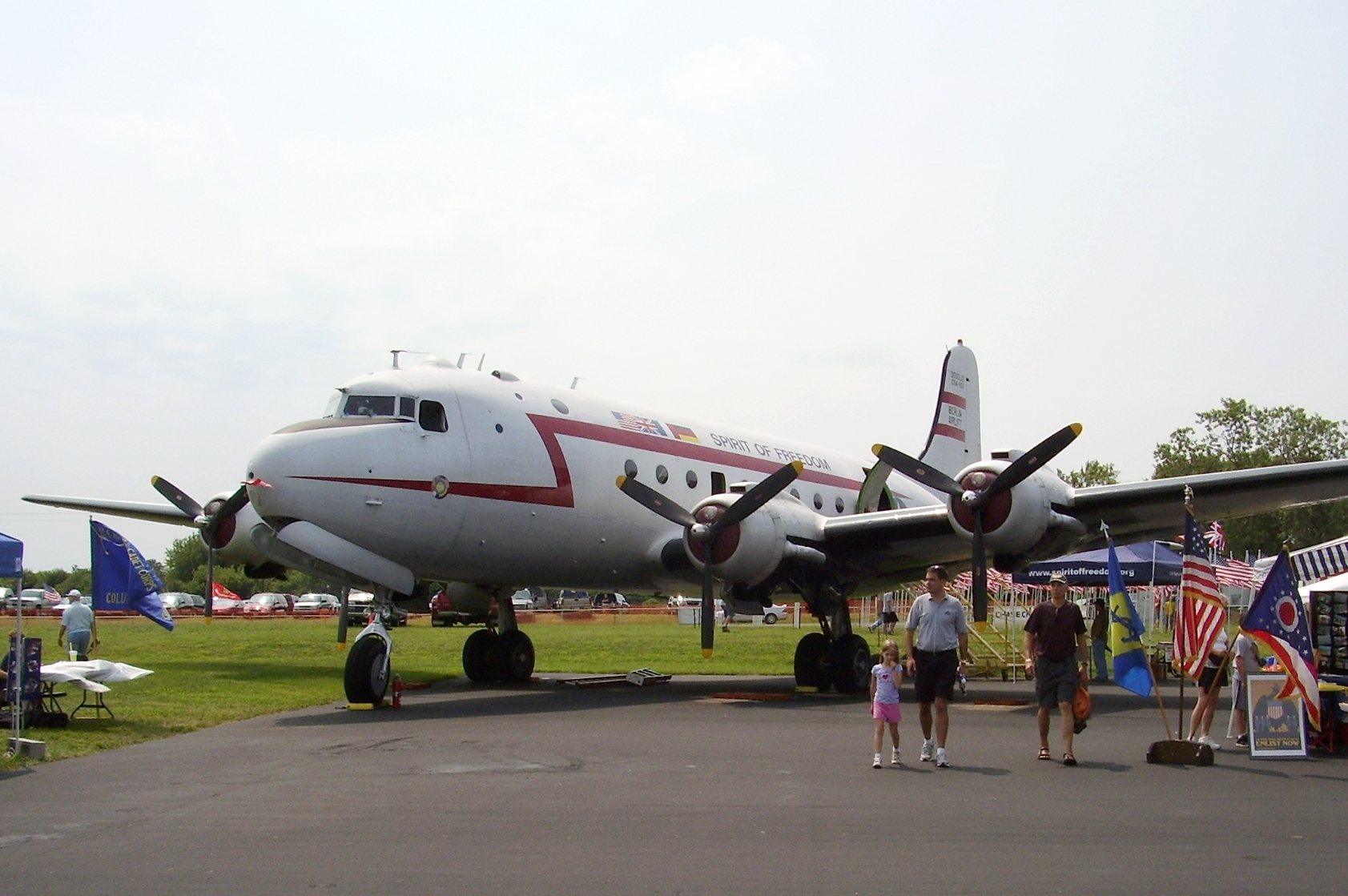
A Douglas C-54 Skymaster, called Spirit of Freedom, currently operated as a flying museum regarding the Berlin Airlift.

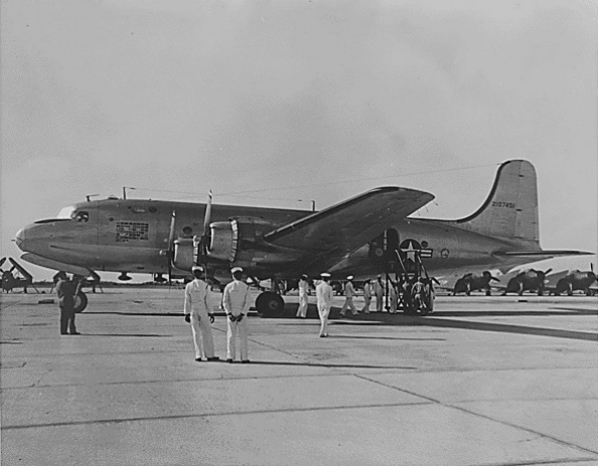
VC-54C, the first aircraft used in the role of Air Force One (by President Franklin D. Roosevelt).

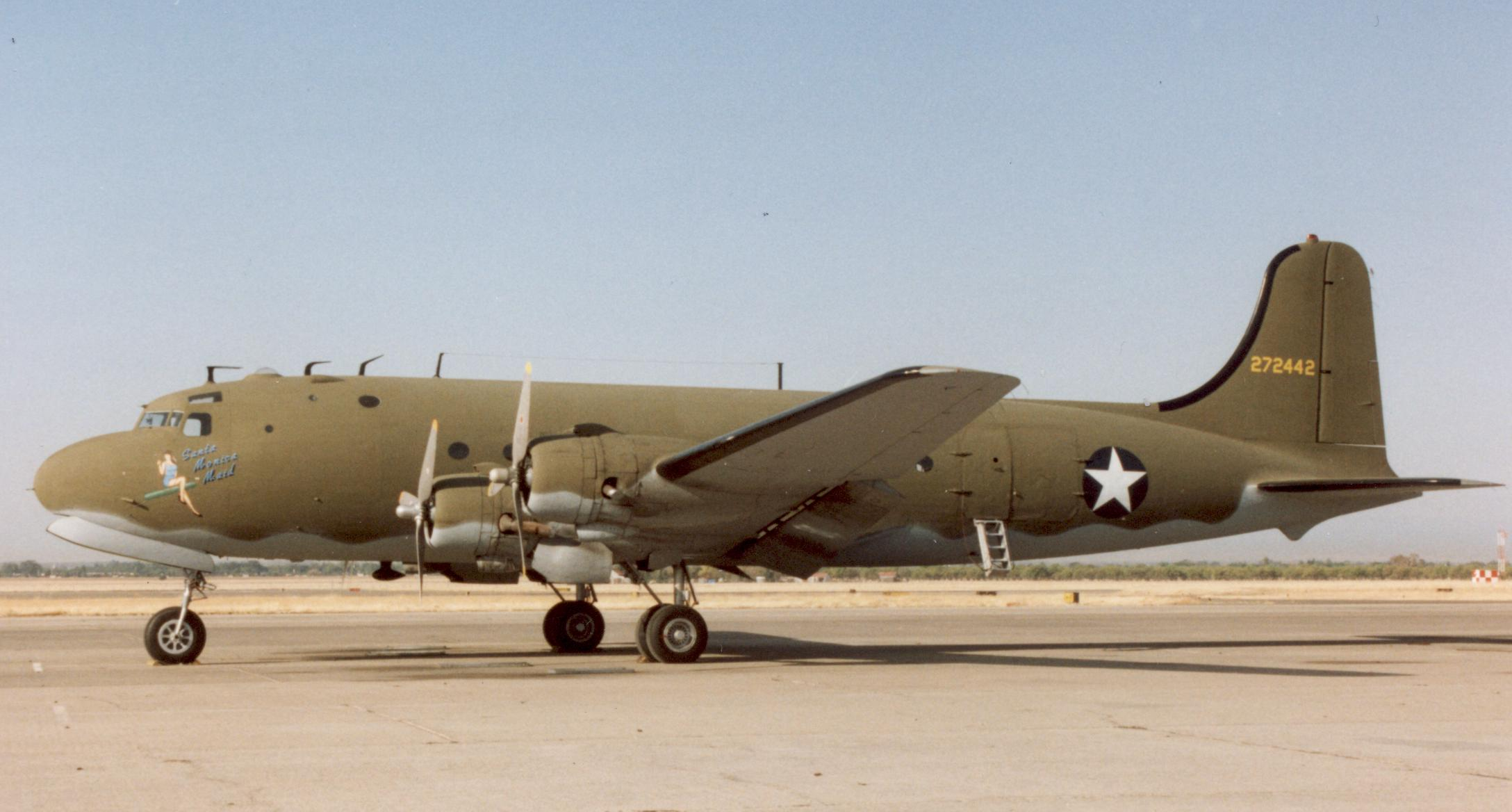
C-54D repainted in USAAF wartime markings. Chico, California, October 1992

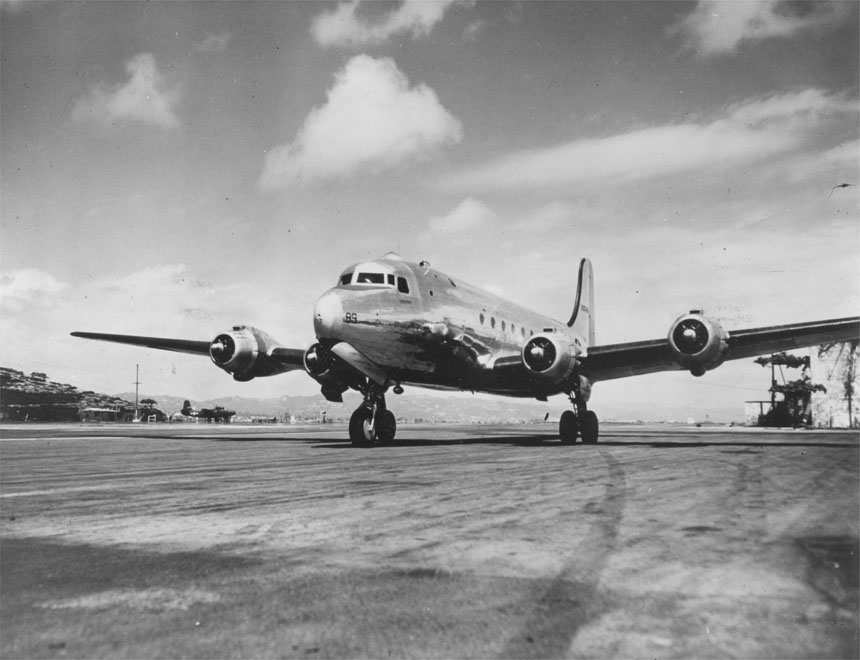
C-54E.

C-54
First production variant adapted from DC-4, 24 built.
C-54A
First military version with strengthened airframe, increased fuel capacity, provision for passengers or cargo, Navy equivalent R5D-1, 252 built.
MC-54A
Optional designation for C-54As used for medical evacuation.
ZC-54A
Redesignation for "obsolete" C-54As.
ZJC-54A
One ZC-54A converted for flight testing.
C-54B
Increased fuel capacity in the wing, One was used by Winston Churchill, 220 built.
VC-54C
One C-54A converted as presidential transport version (Sacred Cow colloq.) delivered to Air Transport Command in June 1944 for Franklin D. Roosevelt and used by Harry Truman (officially retired July 1961, transferred to "National Air Museum of the Smithsonian Institution" on December 4, 1961)
C-54D
Same as C-54B but with R-2000-11 engines, 380 built.
AC-54D
Small number of aircraft modified with special electronic calibration and communications equipment. The aircraft were redesignated EC-54D.
EC-54D
Redesignation of the AC-54D.
HC-54D Rescuemaster
Redesignation of the SC-54D.
JC-54D
Nine C-54Ds temporary converted for missile tracking and nose-cone recovery.
SC-54D
38 aircraft converted by Convair, as search and rescue aircraft. Later redesignated HC-54D.
TC-54D
C-54Ds converted into multi-engine training aircraft.
VC-54D
C-54Ds converted into VIP transport aircraft.
WC-54D
C-54Ds converted for weather reconnaissance.
C-54E
Further revision to fuel tanks and provision for rapid conversion from passenger to cargo, 125 built.
AC-54E
C-54Es converted for airways calibration, redesignated EC-54E in 1962.
EC-54E
AC-54E redesignated in 1962.
HC-54E
SC-54E redesignated in 1962.
SC-54E
C-54E converted for air-sea rescue, redesignated HC-54E in 1962.
VC-54E
C-54Es converted as a staff transport.
XC-54F
Proposed experimental paratroop version, not built.
C-54G

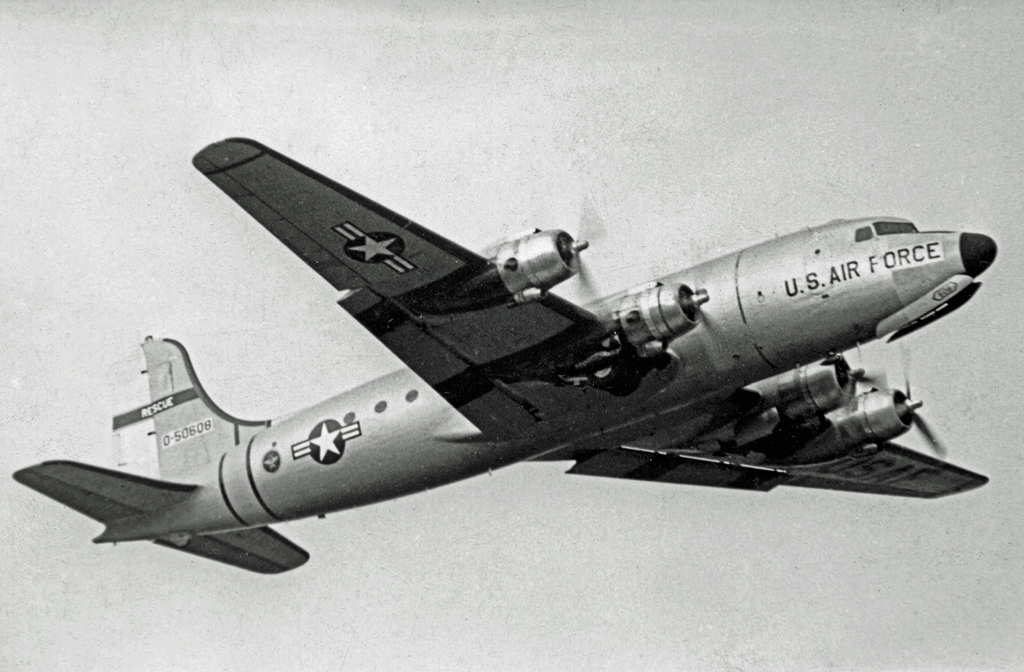
USAF MATS HC-54G search and rescue conversion taking off in 1963

Same as C-54E but with different version of the R2000 engine. 400 ordered of which 162 were completed, remainder cancelled.
HC-54G
SC-54G redesignated in 1962.
JC-54G
C-54Gs used for temporary testing.
SC-54G
C-54Gs converted for air-sea rescue, redesignated HC-54G in 1962.
VC-54G
C-54Gs converted into VIP/staff transport aircraft.

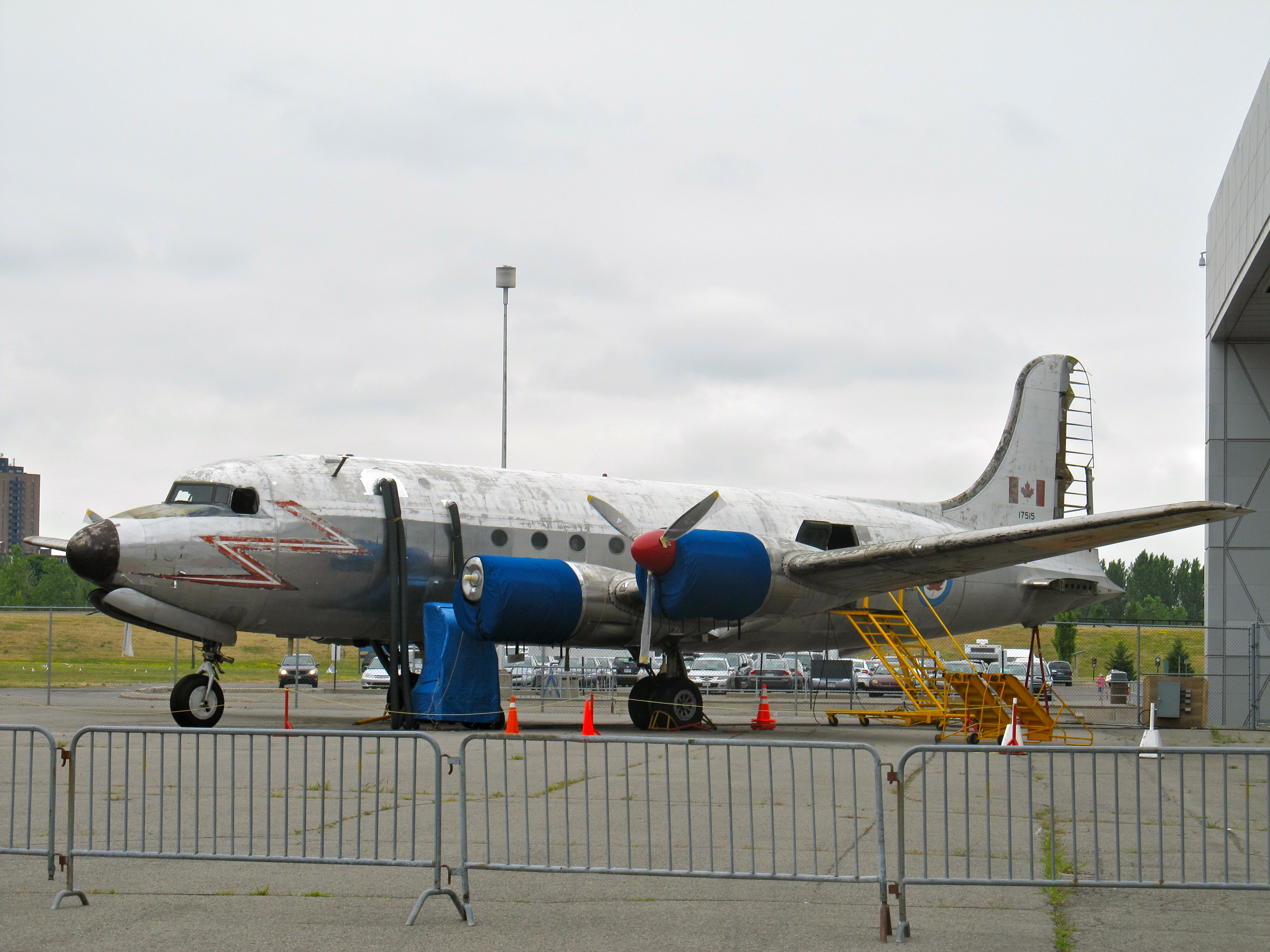
Canadair C-54GM North Star Mk 1 under restoration.

C-54GM North Star Mk 1
Four-engined military transport aircraft for the RCAF, powered by four Rolls-Royce Merlin 620 piston engines. A total of 24 built for RCAF transport use, (the first six actually modified DC-4s).

C-54GM North Star Mk M1 ST
North Star Mk M1s converted into passenger transport aircraft.

C-54H
Paratroop transport. None built.
C-54J
Staff transport project, none built. Navy designation R5D-6.
XC-54K
Long range version, one aircraft built with Wright R-1820 engines.
C-54L
One C-54A aircraft tested in 1947 with an experimental fuel system.
C-54M
Specialized modification of C-54 to carry coal during the Berlin Airlift, 38 conversions.
MC-54M
Specialized modification of C-54E for medical evacuation, 30 conversions.
VC-54M
Single MC-54M converted to a VIP transport.
VC-54N
R5D-1Z redesignated in 1962.
C-54P
R5D-2 redesignated in 1962.
VC-54P
R5D-2Z redesignated in 1962.

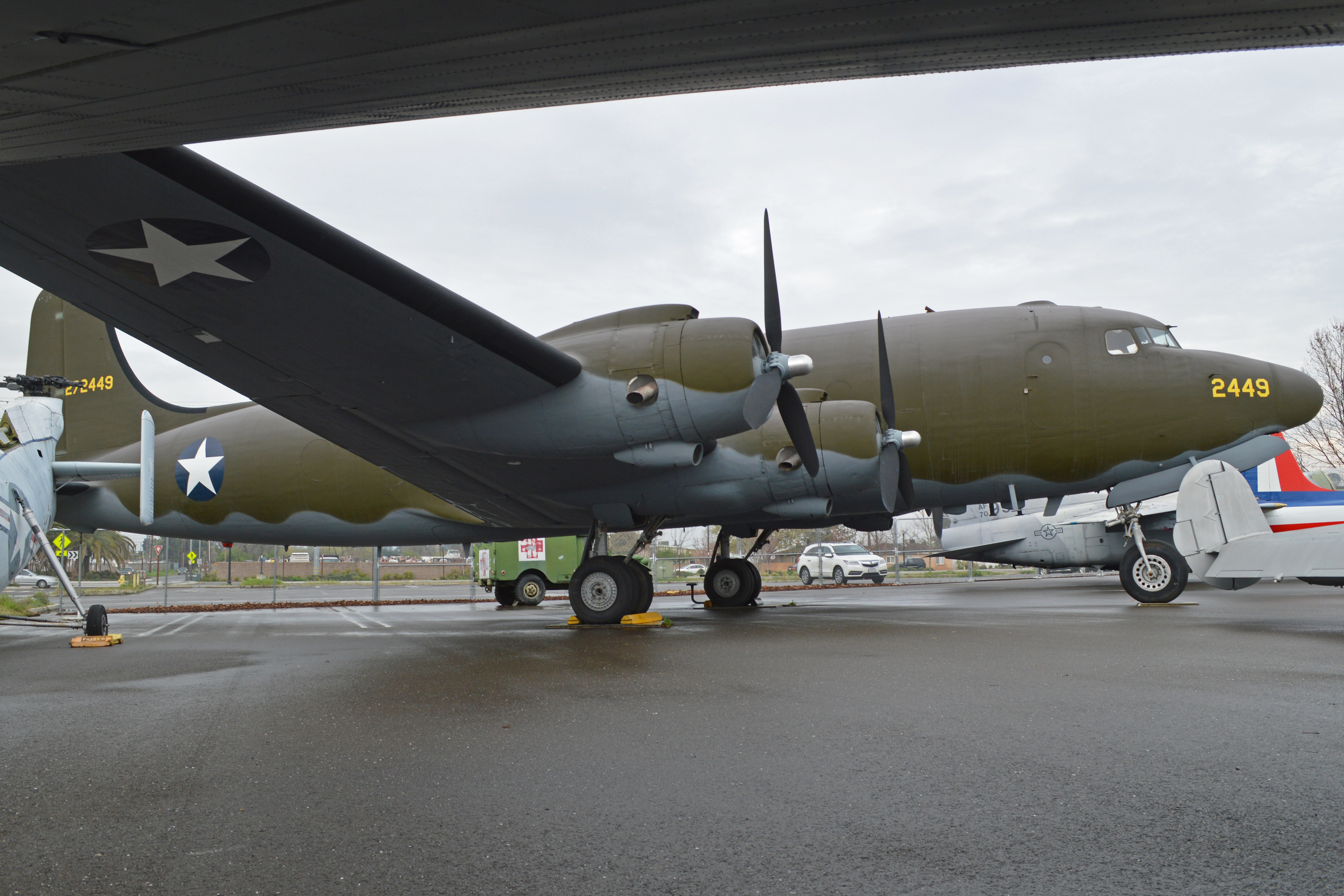
C-54Q on display at the Aerospace Museum of California at McClellan Airport

C-54Q
R5D-3 redesignated in 1962.
VC-54Q
R5D-3Z redesignated in 1962.
C-54R
R5D-4R redesignated in 1962.
C-54S
R5D-5 redesignated in 1962.
VC-54S
R5D-5Z redesignated in 1962.
C-54T
R5D-5R redesignated in 1962.
EC-54U
R5D-4 redesignated in 1962.
RC-54V
R5D-3P redesignated in 1962.
R5D-1
56 C-54As transferred to the United States Navy.
R5D-1C
R5D-1s modified in US Navy service, with a fuel system based on the one used in the C-54B.
R5D-1F
Naval staff transport conversions of the R5D-1, redesignated R5D-1Z then VC-54N.
R5D-1Z
Interim designation of the R5D-1F.
R5D-2
30 C-54Bs transferred to the United States Navy, redesignated C-54P in 1962.
R5D-2F
Naval staff transport conversion of the R5D-2, redesignated R5D-2Z then VC-54P in 1962.
R5D-2Z
Interim designation of the R5D-2F.
R5D-2-2
R5D-2 converted to a radar and radio testbed with a dorsal mast and wingtip pods.

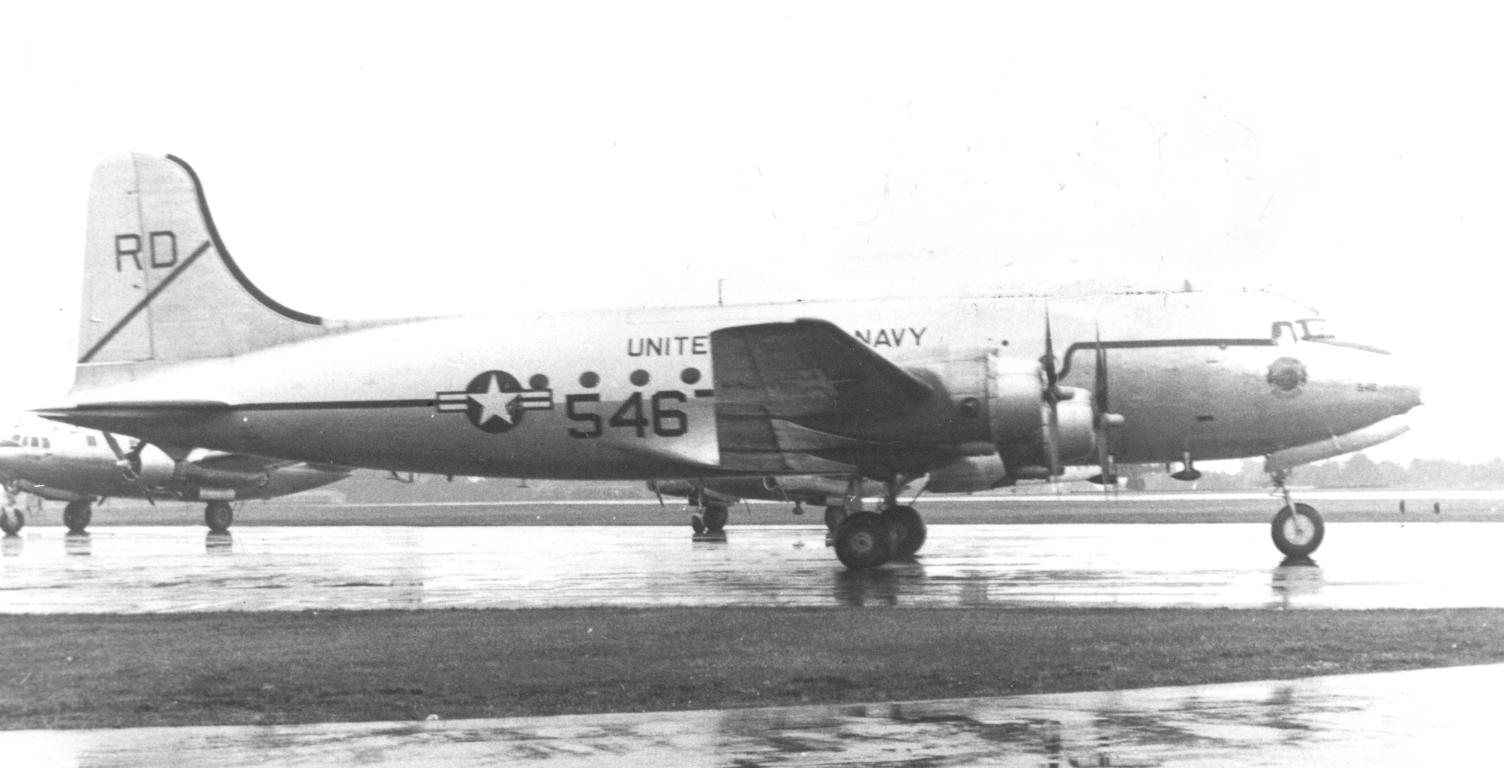
U.S.Navy R5D-3 Skymaster at Blackbushe, Hampshire, in 1954

R5D-3
95 C-54Ds transferred to the United States Navy, redesignated C-54Q in 1962.
R5D-3P
Photo survey conversions of the R5D-3, redesignated RC-54V in 1962.
R5D-3Z
Naval staff transport conversions of the R5D-3, redesignated VC-54Q in 1962.
R5D-4
20 C-54Es transferred to the United States Navy, redesignated EC-54U in 1962.
R5D-4R
Passenger only conversion of the R5D-4, redesignated C-54R in 1962.
R5D-5
R5D-2 and R5D-3s re-engined to approximate C-54G standards, redesignated C-54S in 1962.
R5D-5R
Passenger only conversion of the R5D-5, redesignated C-54T in 1962, 86 conversion.
R5D-5Z
Staff transport conversion of the R5D-5, redesignated VC-54S in 1962.
R5D-6
Proposed USN version of the C-54J with passenger interior, not built.
XC-112
Pressurized variant of the C-54B with Pratt & Whitney R-2800 engines. None built.
XC-112A
As XC-112. One built. Developed into DC-6 / C-118 family. Later redesignated YC-112A.
XC-114
Stretched C-54E powered by Allison V-1710 engines. One built.
XC-115
XC-114 with Packard V-1650 engines. None Built.
YC-116
XC-114 with thermal de-icing rather than rubber boots for testing, one built.
Skymaster I
Royal Air Force designation for 22 C-54Ds.
B.L.3
(Thai: บ.ล.๓) Royal Thai Armed Forces designation for the C-54.

== See also ==
Related development

- Aviation Traders Carvair
- Canadair North Star
- Douglas DC-4
- Douglas C-54 Skymaster
- Douglas DC-6
- Douglas DC-7

Aircraft of comparable role, configuration, and era

- Avro York
- Boeing 307 Stratoliner
- Lockheed Constellation
- Lockheed L-049 Constellation

Related lists

- List of airliners
- List of aircraft
