= Namibia Airports Company =

- Company type: State owned enterprise
- Industry: Aviation
- Founded: 1998
- Headquarters: Windhoek, Namibia
- Key people: Lot Haifidi (CEO)
- Products: Airports operations
- Website: airports.com.na

The Namibia Airports Company (NAC) is the national operator of eight of the largest airports in Namibia. It is a state owned enterprise, overseen by the Ministry of Public Works and Transport. The NAC is a member of major international airport organizations such as the Airports Council International (ACI).

Lot Haifidi was appointed acting CEO on 3 August 2018 following the resignation of Albertus Aochamub. Between 2010 and 2015, NAC wanted to invest more than 1.2 billion Namibian dollars in the expansion of its airports.

== Airports ==
The NAC operates the following airports in terms of infrastructure, maintenance, technology, flight handling, passenger handling, parking, rental of store and other space and employee development:

- Hosea Kutako International Airport at Windhoek
- Eros Airport in Windhoek
- Walvis Bay Airport in Walvis Bay
- Lüderitz Airport in Lüderitz
- Keetmanshoop Airport in Keetmanshoop
- Ondangwa Airport in Ondangwa
- Rundu Airport in Rundu
- Katima Mulilo Airport in Katima Mulilo
