= Ongava Airstrip =

Airstrip in Etosha National Park, Namibia

- IATA: OGV; ICAO: FYNG

Summary
- Airport type: Public
- Owner: Ongava Game Reserve
- Operator: Ongava Game Reserve (Pty) Ltd.
- Serves: Etosha National Park/Ongava Game Reserve
- Location: Etosha National Park, Kunene Region
- Time zone: CAT (UTC+02:00)
- Elevation AMSL: 1,150 m (3,770 ft)
- Coordinates: 19°19′44″S 15°54′05″E
- Website: Official website

Map
- Location in Namibia

Runways
Direction	Length		Surface
Direction	m	ft	Surface
07/25	1,700	5,577	Calcrete
- Source:Ongava Game Reserve

Ongava Airstrip (IATA: OGV, ICAO: FYNG), is a private airstrip serving Ongava Game Reserve and Etosha National Park in Namibia. The airport has scheduled flights to Windhoek, Twyfelfontein and Mokuti Lodge.

== Airlines and destinations ==
Airlines	Destinations
Wilderness Air	Windhoek-Hosea Kutako
FlyNamibia Safari	Twyfelfontein, Mokuti Lodge
