= Hosea Kutako International Airport =

International airport in Windhoek, Namibia

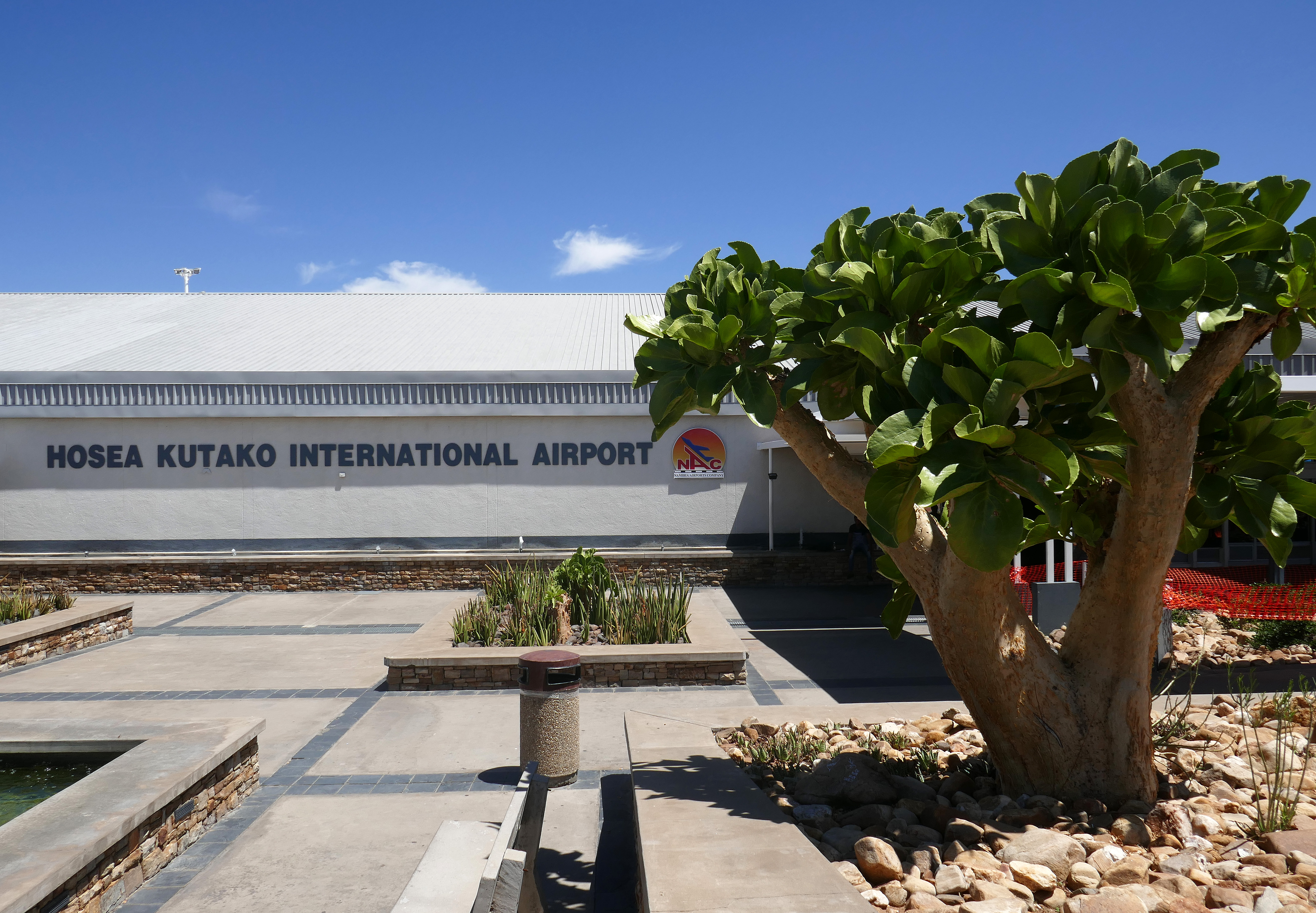
- IATA: WDH; ICAO: FYWH

Summary
- Airport type: Public
- Operator: Namibia Airports Company
- Hub for: FlyNamibia
- Elevation AMSL: 5,640 ft (1,720 m)
- Coordinates: 22°29′12″S 017°27′45″E
- Website: Official website

Map
- Location within Namibia

Runways
Direction	Length		Surface
Direction	m	ft	Surface
08/26	4,532	14,869	Asphalt
16/34	1,524	5,000	Asphalt

Statistics (2024)
- Passengers: ▲1,257,093

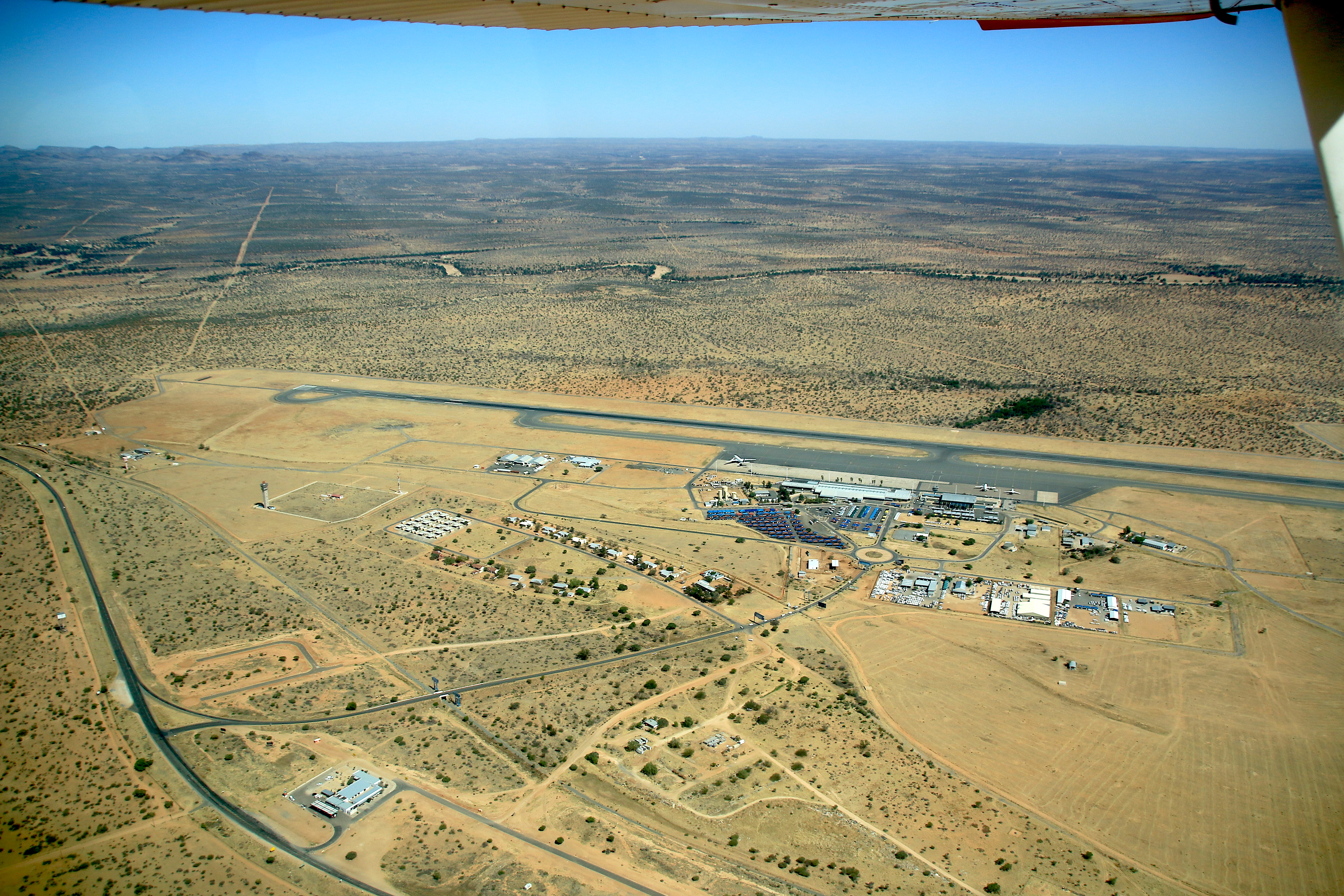
Aerial photograph of Hosea Kutako International Airport.

Hosea Kutako International Airport (also known as HKIA) (IATA: WDH, ICAO: FYWH) is the main international airport of Namibia, serving the capital city Windhoek. Located 45 km (28 mi) to the east of the city, it is Namibia's largest airport with international connections. From its founding in 1965 to the independence of Namibia in 1990, it was named J.G. Strijdom Airport. In 1990 the airport was renamed, in honour of Namibian national hero Hosea Kutako (1870–1970).

== History ==
The airport was opened in 1965 (61 years ago) during the era of South African administration, and was then named J.G. Strijdom Airport, after the Nationalist Prime Minister of South Africa. It was renamed Hosea Kutako International Airport following independence in 1990.

After Namibian Independence in March 1990, the French airline, UTA (Union de Transports Aériens) included operations from Paris–Charles de Gaulle to Windhoek via Johannesburg and Gaborone. Hosea Kutako International Airport was the main hub for Air Namibia. Until recently, the absence of limited, direct international flights to Windhoek has forced passengers to fly via Johannesburg's OR Tambo International Airport, or Cape Town International Airport, resulting in additional transit visa costs, visa processing time taken by respective embassies and longer travel time. There are around 46 direct flights weekly between Hosea Kutako International Airport and O. R. Tambo International Airport. Menzies Aviation, an international company registered in the UK, was awarded the ground handling service operations at Hosea Kutako International Airport in November 2013. However, they were evicted in August 2023 due to a long-standing legal battle with the Namibia Airports Company. Paragon commenced ground handling services in replacement shortly after. Condor Airlines introduced flights between Frankfurt and Windhoek since November 2014. Since 2016, Qatar Airways, KLM Royal Dutch Airlines and Ethiopian Airlines have started flying to Windhoek. Qatar Airways suspended operations to Windhoek in October, 2023.Eurowings, the low-cost subsidiary of Lufthansa, commenced a bi-weekly service from Cologne/Bonn in July 2017. However, in a bid to streamline its long haul operation for the 2019-season, the airline has decided to end both the Cologne/Bonn and Munich routes to Windhoek. In recent schedule updates however, Eurowings Discover introduced daily flights to the Namibian capital since July 2022, as well as daily doubles 3 times weekly including flights to and from Victoria Falls. As of October 2017, around 315 flights depart and land at HKIA weekly. In August 2017 Air Namibia was granted 5th freedom rights to operate cargo and traffic between Windhoek, Lagos, Nigeria and Accra, Ghana. These destinations were cancelled by the airline in May, 2019. Westair Aviation has commenced scheduled flights April 1, 2018 from Windhoek-Eros. In March 2018, Ethiopian Airlines introduced Africa's first Boeing 787-9 Dreamliner to Namibia. Due to flight performance and headwinds, Airlink in March 2019 has decided to re-direct its technical fuel-stop in Windhoek to Walvis Bay Airport, a move which would accommodate more passengers on the final leg to Saint Helena Airport. FlyWestair, a subsidiary of privately owned Westair Aviation introduced scheduled passenger flights between Windhoek and Cape Town from early March 2022.

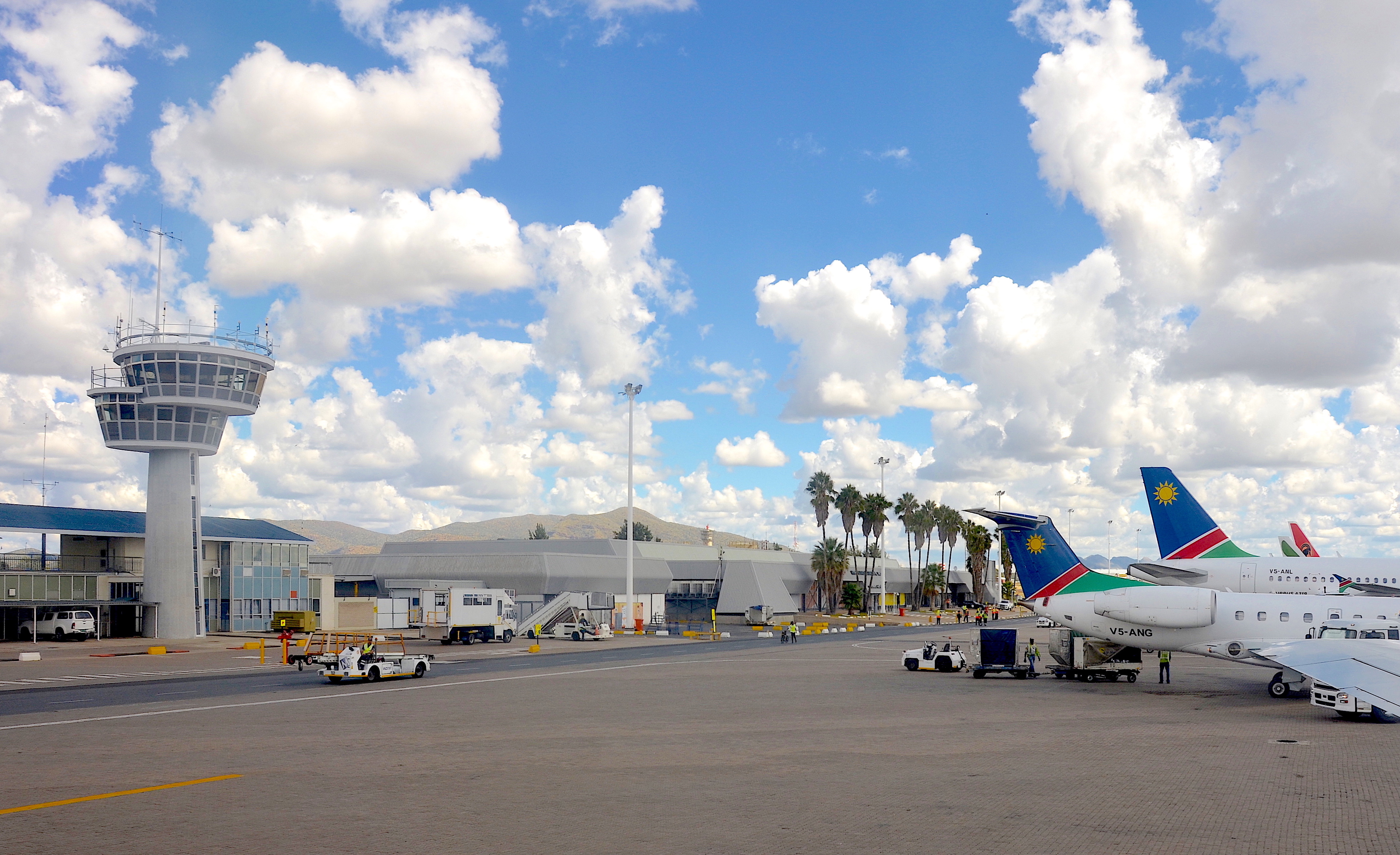
Apron view

In December 2017, Hosea Kutako International Airport (HKIA), Namibia's flagship airport, hosted officials from the Airport Council International (ACI) APEX partners from the Dublin Airport Authority, Airports Company South Africa, Office National des Aéroports of Morocco, Ghana Airports Company and Airports of Mauritius Company, aiming to confirm a declaration of ACI APEX Safety Peer-review Programme with the Namibia Airports Company (NAC).

On 10 January 2018, the Namibian Civil Aviation Authority launched the implementation of Africa's first centralised aeronautical database. This technology (Africa-Aeronautical Database or A-CAD), will allow flight planners the option of operating at the press of a button by using various mobile devices and follows the requirements of the International Civil Aviation Organization (ICAO). Kenya Airways in May 2021 signed an interline agreement with South African airline, Airlink, to connect passengers from Nairobi via Johannesburg and Cape Town to Windhoek.

The airport handled 1,681,336 passengers in 2019.

Although Hosea Kutako International Airport is the main airport for international flights to and from Namibia, few domestic flights originate at Hosea Kutako International Airport as those are predominantly handled at the smaller Windhoek Eros Airport, about 4,7 km (2,92 mi) south of Windhoek's central business district. In September 2019, UPS Airlines announced that the company is adding Namibia to its global air-cargo network.

The airport is operated by Namibia Airports Company.

On 11 February 2021, Air Namibia which maintained its home base and hub at the airport, ceased all operations.

In November 2021, Westair Namibia, the parent company of FlyWestair, rebranded to FlyNamibia.

In October 2023 Turkish Airlines added Windhoek to their list of future African destinations.South African Airways resumed its post-Covid operation between Johannesburg and Windhoek with daily doubles in December 2022. The airline plans to add thrice daily flights to increase capacity between Windhoek and Johannesburg as of October 2024. In late 2024 Air Botswana widens its regional capacity with flights to Windhoek from three of its main centres, Gaborone, Maun and Kasane. Zurich-based Edelweiss Air has established a direct route to Windhoek commencing June 2026. In December 2025 FlyNamibia signed an interline agreement with Fastjet Zimbabwe linking flights from Windhoek to Harare via Victoria Falls.

== Facilities ==
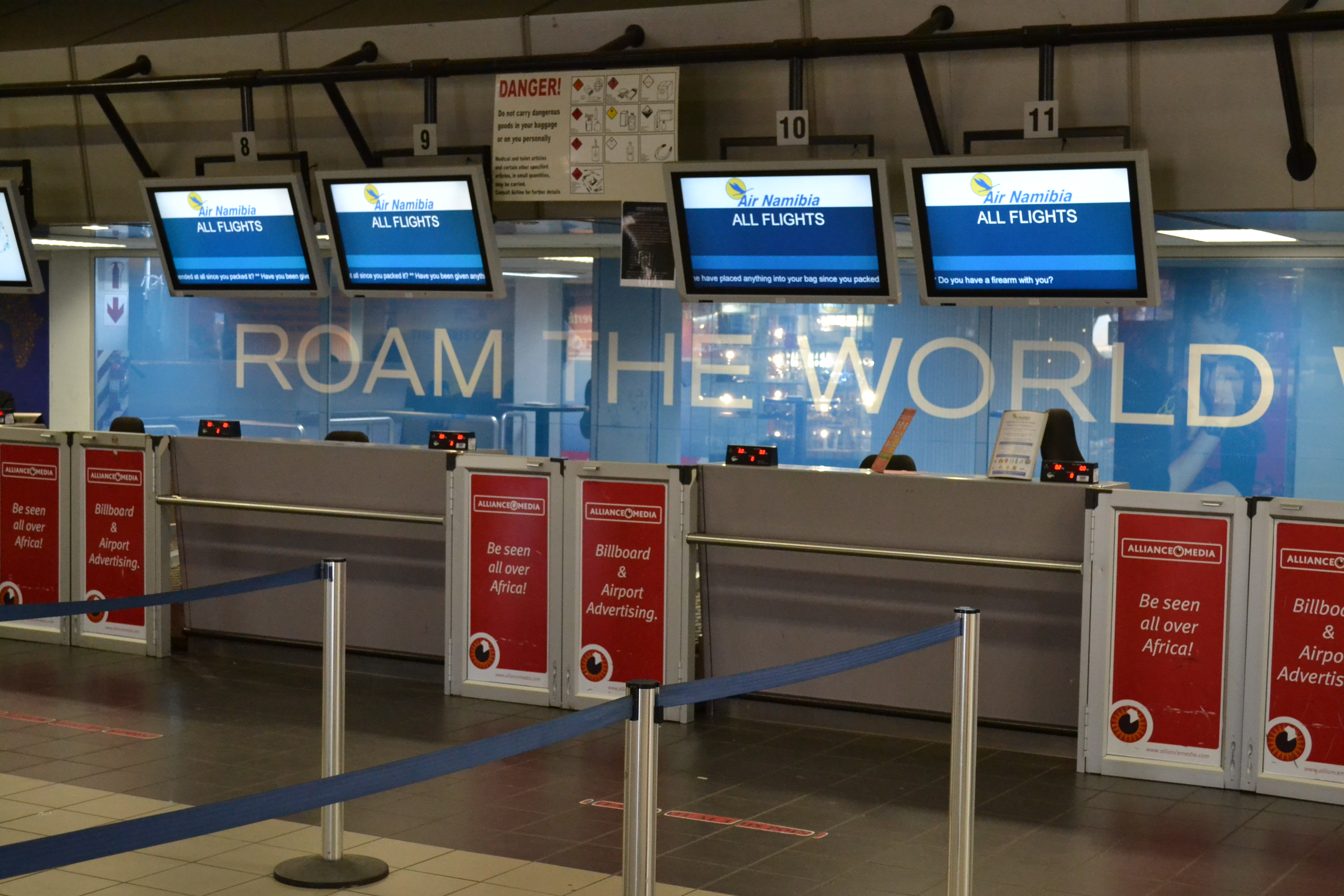
Check-in area

Though there are few services available near the field, the Sungate Namibia Business Park is being constructed just outside the airport, which will include car rental facilities, airline catering, a truck stop and bureau de change. Improvements to the terminal building have been the recently refurbished duty free restaurant, TAX refund facilities and public (short and long term) parking area. In February 2014, Namibia Airports Company acquired 11 Merce Rhino fire vehicles, of which 2 are assigned to Hosea Kutako Airport, (a Category 9 airport). This accruement exceed the requirements of the International Civil Aviation Organization's (ICAO) safety standards. Free WiFi is available at the duty free restaurant.

The 214 square metres "Amushe"-business lounge was opened in September 2016, comfortably accommodating 55 passengers at a time.

== Expansion ==
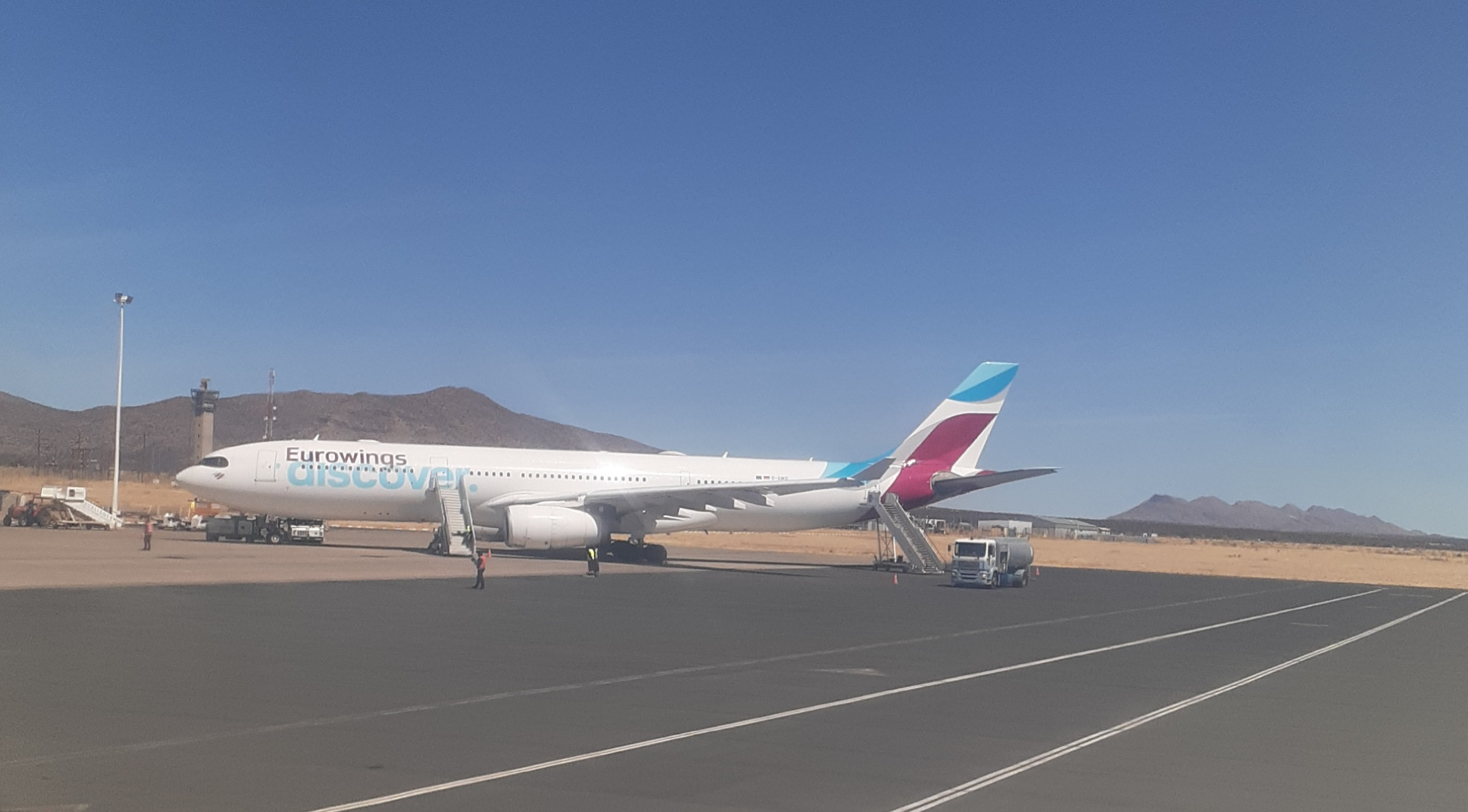
Apron view with a Eurowings Discover aircraft

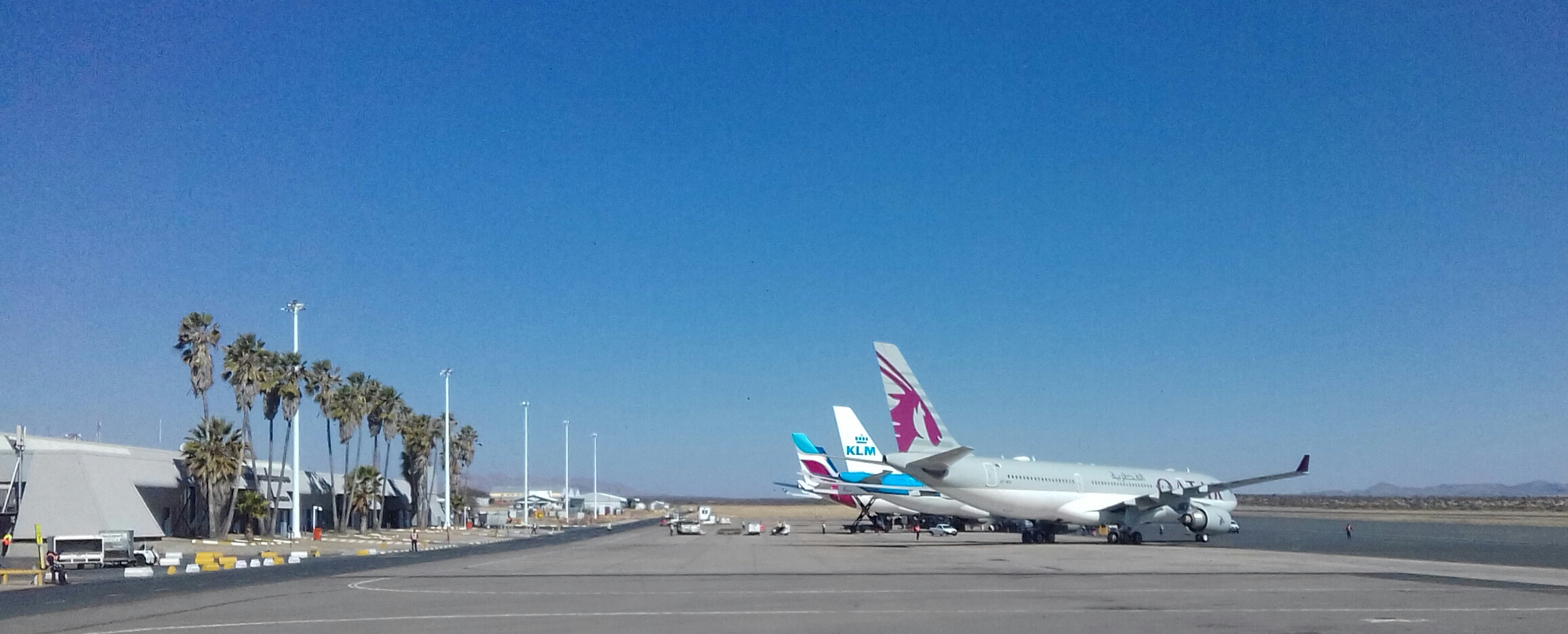
Hosea Kutako International Airport apron, August 2017

The Namibia Airports Company (NAC) is in the planning stages of constructing a new airport complete with aerodrome classification of category 4F (of the International Aviation Organization (ICAO) Aerodrome Reference Code in terms of Annex 14 of ICAO). This new development would render the airport to accommodate multiple wide-bodied code F aircraft. This project would require a new runway, including taxiways/ aprons. The NAC envisages a newly constructed terminal building that would include separate VIP check-in/ ancillary facilities. A new traffic control tower and fire station would complete the project. In November 2017, the Namibian Government and the Vice Minister of China, Qian Keming, signed an economic and technical cooperation agreement, which will see China offer around 30 million U.S. dollars for part of the N$900m/78 km dual carriageway between the airport and Windhoek. In May 2018 a spokesperson for Namibia Airports Company announced that the arrivals- and check-in hall, the luggage handling area, the security screening point will be temporarily improved. With airport traffic increasing, the need for a new terminal, runway and apron has been prioritised. In September 2019, a local building contractor, Nexus Building Contractor, initiated the Congestion Alleviation project. This N$250 million project targets to double the handling capacity to accommodate increased passenger numbers up until 2030. The project also includes the construction of a new arrival hall, expansion of the current departure hall, and increasing the security screening points. In August 2025 the Namibia Airports Company (NAC) revealed plans for the building of a third terminal to accommodate the rise in tourism to the country, which includes apron expansion and VIP facilities.

== Airlines and destinations ==
The following airlines operate regular scheduled services at the airport:

=== Passenger ===
Airlines	Destinations
Airlink	Cape Town, Johannesburg–O. R. Tambo
Condor	Frankfurt (resumes 24 June 2027)
Discover Airlines	Frankfurt, Munich
Edelweiss Air	Seasonal: Zurich
Ethiopian Airlines	Addis Ababa
Fly Angola	Benguela, Catumbela, Luanda, Lubango
FlyNamibia	Cape Town, Victoria Falls; Seasonal: Katima Mulilo, Maun
FlyNamibia Safari	Ongava/Etosha, Mokuti Lodge, Swakopmund, Sossusvlei, Twyfelfontein
FlySafair	Cape Town
Proflight Zambia	Livingstone, Lusaka, Ndola
South African Airways	Johannesburg–O. R. Tambo
TAAG Angola Airlines	Luanda–Agostinho Neto

=== Cargo ===
Airlines	Destinations
Airlink Cargo	Johannesburg–O. R. Tambo
BidAir Cargo	Johannesburg–O. R. Tambo
Ethiopian Cargo	Addis Ababa
Lufthansa Cargo	Frankfurt

== Ground transportation ==
The airport operates shuttle services into Windhoek.

== See also ==
- South African Airways Flight 228
