= Maun Airport =

Airport in Botswana

Maun International Airport
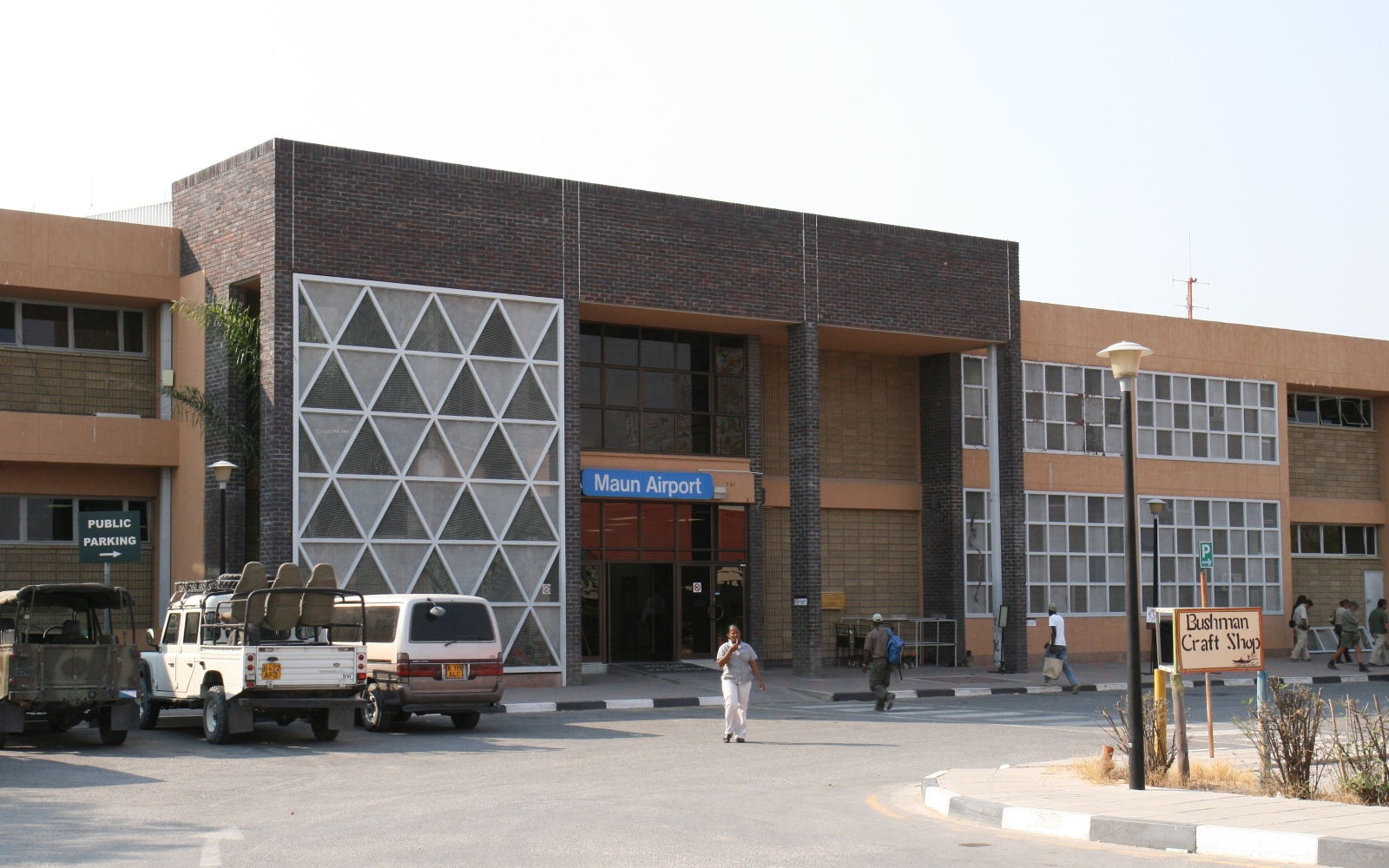
- IATA: MUB; ICAO: FBMN

Summary
- Airport type: Public
- Operator: Civil Aviation Authority of Botswana
- Serves: Maun, Botswana
- Hub for: Air Botswana; Mack Air
- Elevation AMSL: 3,093 ft (943 m)
- Coordinates: 19°58′21″S 23°25′50″E
- Website: caab.co.bw/maun-international-airport

Map
- Location of the airport in Botswana

Runways
| Direction | Length | | Surface |
| Direction | m | ft | Surface |
|---|---|---|---|
| 08/26 | 3,700 | 12,139 | Asphalt |
- Sources: GCM SkyVector

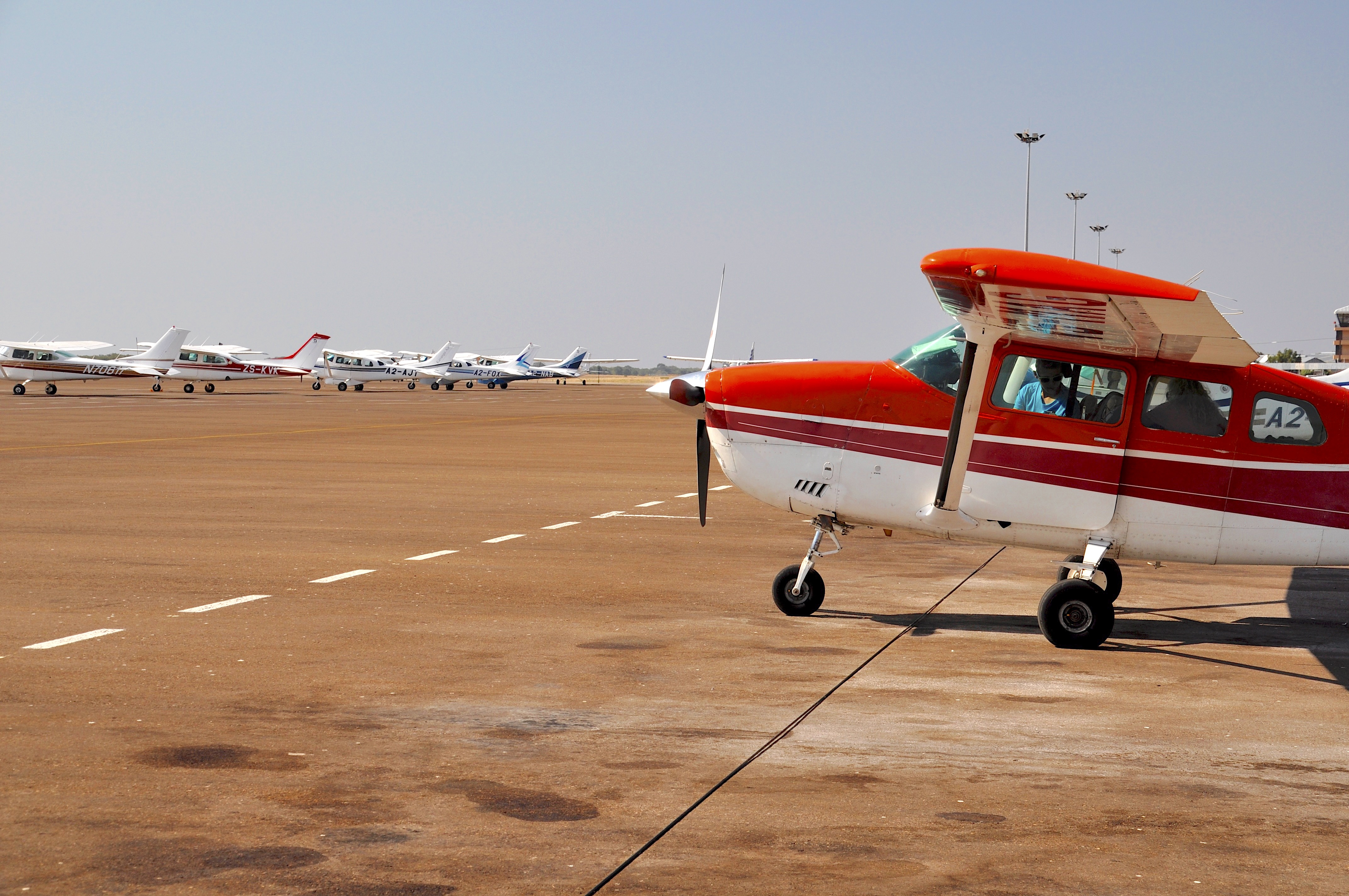
Apron Airport Maun (2015)

Maun Airport (IATA: MUB, ICAO: FBMN) is an international airport serving the town of Maun in the North-West District of Botswana. It is on the north side of the town and is accessible by shuttle bus or taxi.

Maun Airport serves as the main gateway to the Okavango Delta and the Moremi Game Reserve. Many tour operators offer chartered flights over the Delta and to Botswana destinations such as the Makgadikgadi Pans, one of the largest seasonal wetlands in Africa. Servicing the many lodges in the area is a major activity, including the transport of passengers and provisions, with short-distance flights taking a few minutes where the journey by 4x4 truck would take several hours. These operations, during their peak in the June to August high season, make the airport the second-busiest in Africa for aircraft movements.

There are also daily scheduled flights to destinations in Botswana and South Africa.

Wilderness Air operates regular charter flights from its Windhoek-Eros-hub, Namibia to Maun.

== Early history 1925-1939 ==
The aircraft were awaited as they brought news of the outside world, mail, medicines, foodstuffs, and above all, new people to a community hundreds of kilometres from the nearest big town. The first air service began in the 1930s, using a landing strip that today is Maun's main street. The strip was later moved away from the town centre to the present site of the airport.

The earliest known flights over the Okavango took place in July 1925, and were part of a survey of rivers in the region, using aircraft based in Livingstone. Two Airco D.H. 9 type, numbers 142 and 144 of the then Union Defense Force of South Africa, were used, piloted by Captain C.W. Meredith and Lieutenant L. Tasker. They routed to Livingstone from Johannesburg via Bulawayo.

Airlink commenced direct flights between Cape Town and Maun starting in March 2016. In October 2016, Air Namibia suspended scheduled flights to Maun Airport. In May 2018 government officials confirmed their commitment to refurbish and upgrade the existing airport building.

== Airlines and destinations ==
| Airlines | Destinations |
|---|---|
| Air Botswana | Cape Town, Gaborone, Johannesburg–O. R. Tambo, Kasane, Victoria Falls, Windhoek–Hosea Kutako |
| Airlink | Cape Town, Johannesburg–O. R. Tambo |
| CemAir | Johannesburg–O. R. Tambo |
| Ethiopian Airlines | Addis Ababa, Ndola |
| Fastjet Zimbabwe | Victoria Falls |
| FlyNamibia | Seasonal: Katima Mulilo, Windhoek–Hosea Kutako |

== Accidents ==
In March 2000 a Cessna 414 crashed on its way from Gaborone to Maun. The pilot and a passenger walked for over 200 kilometres (120 mi) to find help.

== See also ==
- Transport in Botswana
- List of airports in Botswana
