= List of airlines of Botswana =

This is a list of airlines that have an air operator's certificate issued by the Civil Aviation Authority of Botswana.

Airline	Image	IATA	ICAO	Callsign	Hub airport(s)	Commenced operations	Notes
Air Botswana		BP	BOT	BOTSWANA	Sir Seretse Khama International Airport	1972	Flag carrier of Botswana
Blue Sky Airways (Botswana)				Flying Mission Services	Sir Seretse Khama International Airport	1977	
Kalahari Air Services & Charter				Air Charter Botswana	Sir Seretse Khama International Airport	1968	
Mack Air			MKB	GREENTAIL		1994	
Moremi Air					Maun Airport	1997	
Northern Air (Botswana)							
Wilderness Air			WLD	WILDERNESS	Maun Airport	1991	
Debswana (Botswana)					Sir Seretse Khama International Airport	1978	
Kavango Air						2005	
Major Blue Air					Maun Airport	2010	

== See also ==
- List of airlines
- List of defunct airlines of Botswana
