= Oranjemund Airport =

Airport in Namibia

- IATA: OMD; ICAO: FYOG

Summary
- Airport type: Public
- Serves: Oranjemund, Namibia
- Elevation AMSL: 13 ft (4.0 m)
- Coordinates: 28°35′05″S 016°26′45″E

Map
- Location of airport in Namibia

Runways
Direction	Length		Surface
Direction	m	ft	Surface
02/20	1,600	5,249	Asphalt
- Source: DAFIF GCM

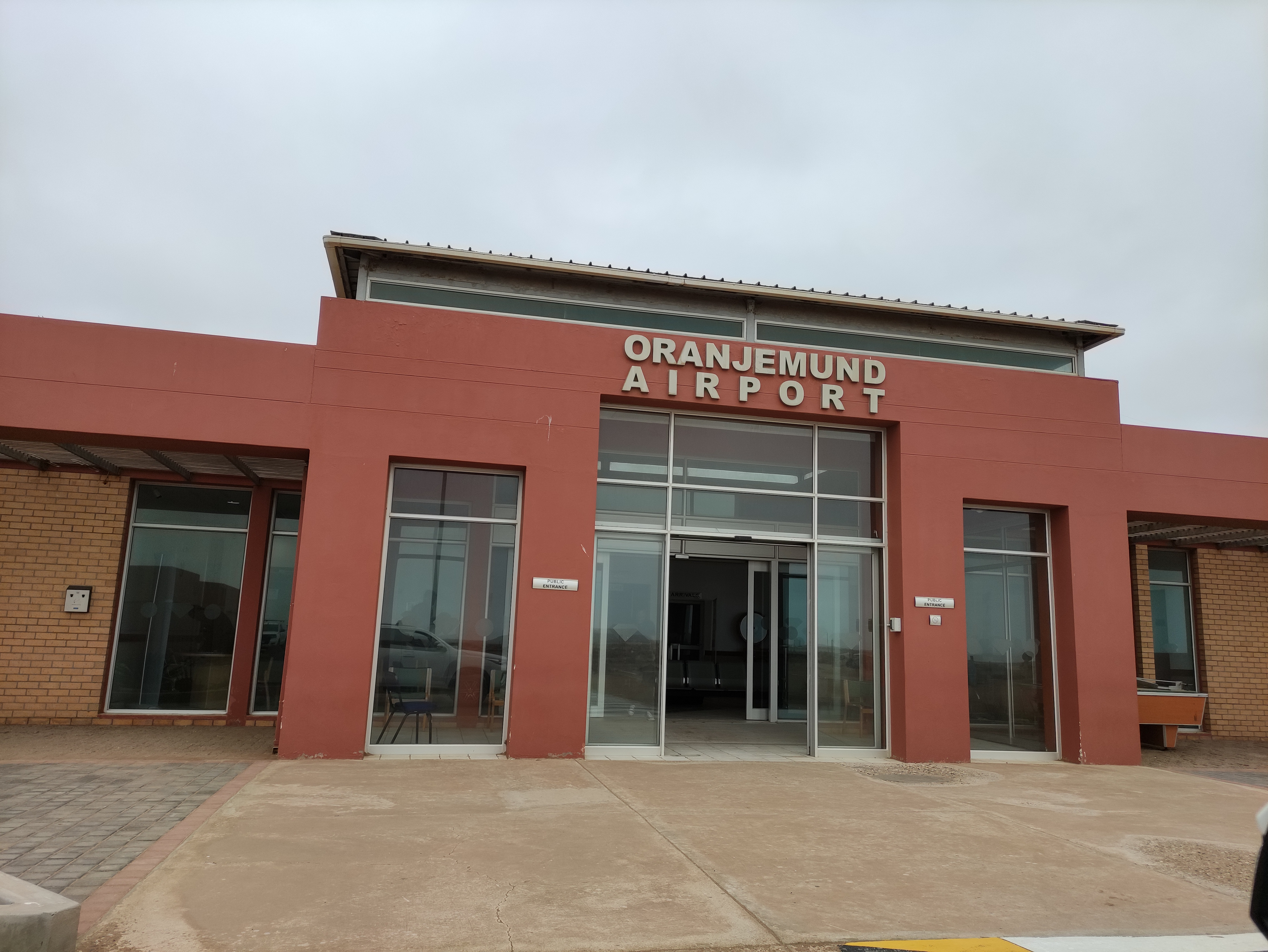
Oranjemund Airport

Oranjemund Airport (IATA: OMD, ICAO: FYOG) is an airport serving Oranjemund, a town in the ǁKaras Region of Namibia. The town and airport are located near the northern bank of the Orange River, which is the border between Namibia and South Africa.

== Airlines and destinations ==
Airlines	Destinations
FlyNamibia	Windhoek–Eros

== See also ==
- List of airports in Namibia
- Transport in Namibia
