= Mokuti Lodge Airport =

Airport in Namibia

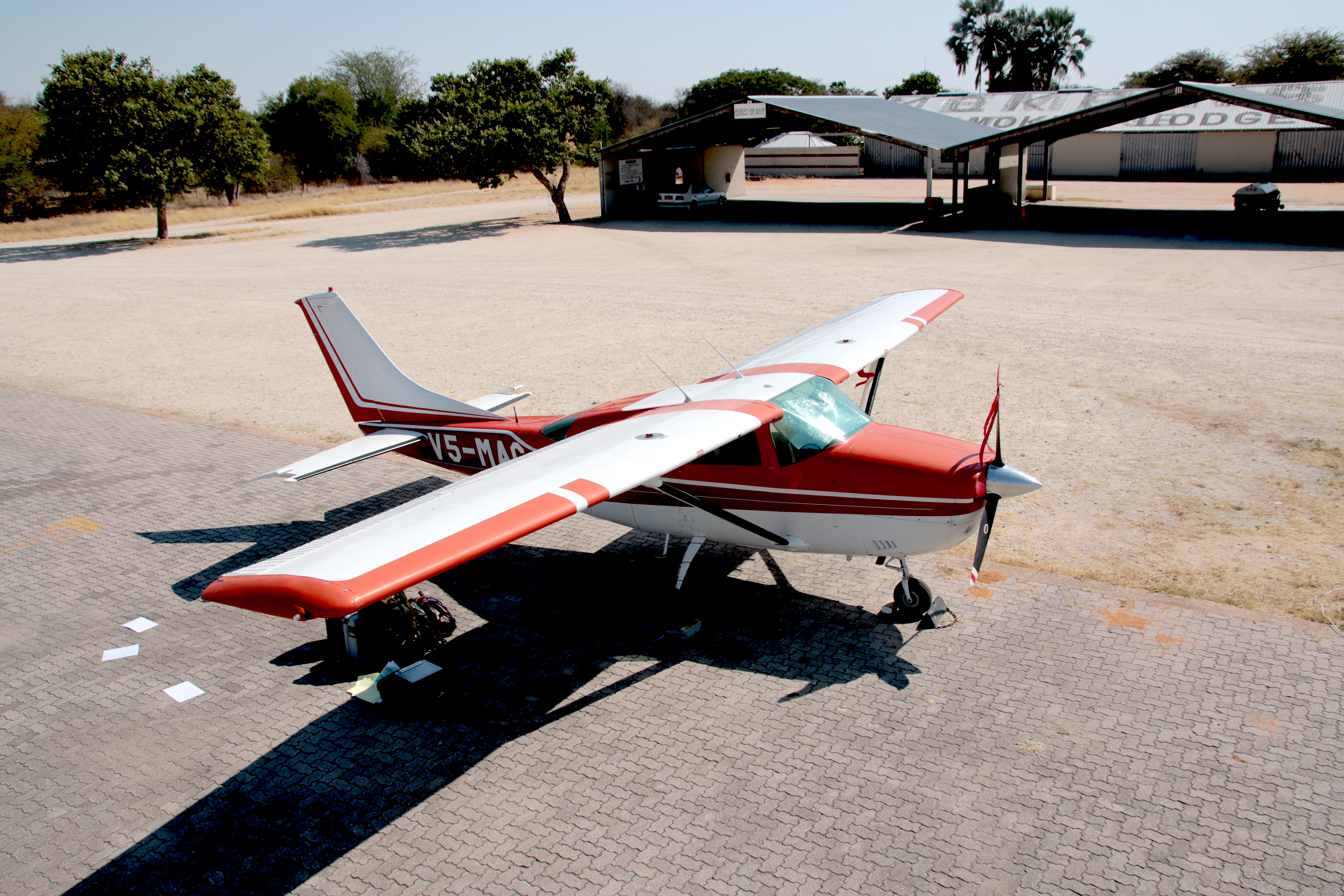
- A Cessna 206 on Mokuti Lodge aerodrome
- IATA: OKU; ICAO: FYMO

Summary
- Airport type: Public
- Serves: Mokuti Lodge
- Elevation AMSL: 3,650 ft (1,110 m)
- Coordinates: 18°48′30″S 17°03′00″E

Map
- Location of the airport in Namibia OKU (Africa)

Runways
Direction	Length		Surface
Direction	ft	m	Surface
08/26	6,970	2,200	Concrete/Gravel
- Source: Google Maps GCM

Mokuti Lodge Airport (IATA: OKU, ICAO: FYMO) is an airport serving Mokuti Lodge resort and the Etosha National Park in Namibia.

== Airlines and destinations ==
Airlines	Destinations
FlyNamibia Safari	Ongava, Windhoek—Hosea Kutako

== See also ==
- List of airports in Namibia
- Transport in Namibia
