= List of defunct airlines of Botswana =

This is a list of now defunct airlines from Botswana.

Airline	Image	IATA	ICAO	Callsign	Commenced operations	Ceased operations	Notes
Aer Kavango					1974	1984	Operated BN-2 Islander
Bechuanaland National Airways		FRW	FBFT		1965	1966	Merged into Botswana National Airways
Botswana Airways Corporation			BAC		1969	1972	Merged into Air Botswana
Botswana Desert Airways					1976	1978	Operated Convair 340
Botswana National Airways			BNA		1966	1969	Merged into Botswana Airways Corporation
Chobe Explorations					1985	1986	Operated Cessna 207
Desert Airways					1978	1984	Established as Esquire Airways
Desert & Delta Air					1982	1983	
NAC Executive Charter					2002	2006	
Northern Air					2004	2008	
Sefofane Air Charters					1991	2009	Renamed to Wilderness Air. Operated Cessna Grand Caravan, Cessna Stationair
Southern Links					1990	1993	
Swamp Air					1995	2004	
Wenela Air Services					1952	1978	Operated Douglas DC-3, Douglas DC-4

== See also ==
- List of airlines of Botswana
- List of airports in Botswana
