= Eros Airport =

Airport in Namibia

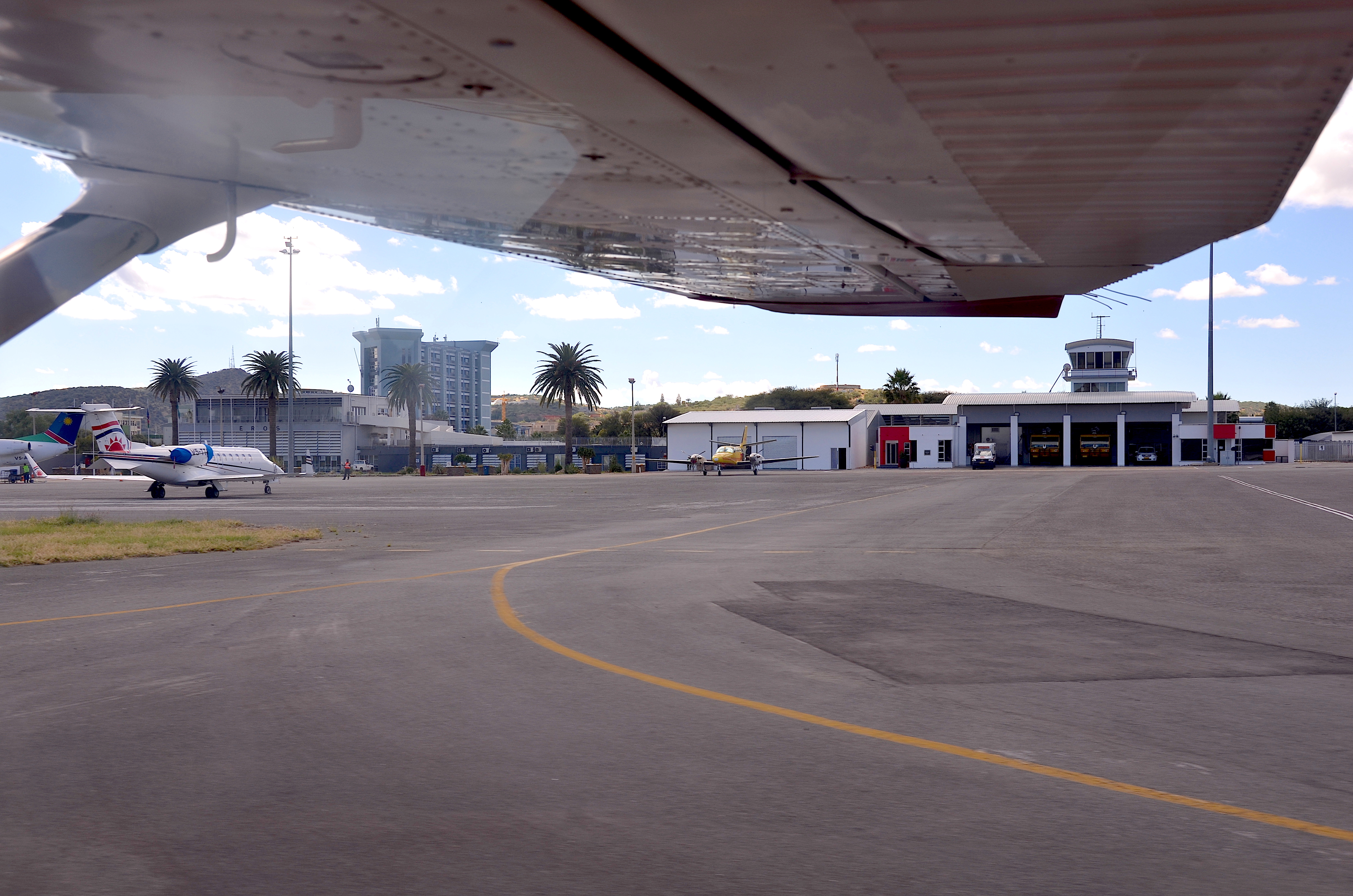
- IATA: ERS; ICAO: FYWE

Summary
- Airport type: Public
- Owner/Operator: Namibia Airports Co.
- Serves: Windhoek, Namibia
- Hub for: Bay Air; Desert Air; Scenic Air; Signa Aviation; Skycore Aviation; Westair Aviation; Wilderness Air; Namibian Aviation Training Academy
- Elevation AMSL: 5,757 ft (1,755 m)
- Coordinates: 22°36′44″S 017°04′50″E
- Website: airports.com.na

Map
- Location of airport in Namibia

Runways
Direction	Length		Surface
Direction	m	ft	Surface
01/19	2,229	7,313	Asphalt
09/27	1,005	3,297	Asphalt

Statistics (2016)
- Passengers: 74,356
- Aircraft movements: 17,620
- Sources: Namibia Airports Co., DAFIF

Eros Airport or Windhoek Eros Airport (IATA: ERS, ICAO: FYWE) is an airport serving Windhoek, the capital and largest city of Namibia. It is located in the Khomas Region, about 5 km (3 mi) south of Windhoek's central business district, and has been a secondary hub for Air Namibia.

== Operations ==
Eros is a busy hub of general aviation and some commercial aviation, which includes Wilderness Air, Bay Air, Westair Aviation, Scenic Air. The airport is the host to commercial, private, and scheduled traffic ranging from high performance jet aircraft to Cessna 152 trainers. The majority of traffic comes from the general aviation charter market, consisting mainly of the Cessna 210 aircraft, which is the most commonly used aircraft for charter and fly-in safaris in Namibia. Scenic-Air operates a regular charter service from Eros Airport, using Cessna Centurion equipment. The airport handles approximately 150 to 200 movements per day (around 50,000 per year). In 2016, the airport served 74,356 passengers. Wilderness Air offers regular transfers to Maun in Botswana, Livingstone and Lusaka in Zambia, and Victoria Falls in Zimbabwe. In April 2018, Westair Aviation scheduled passenger services to 6 new destinations in Namibia and South Africa. In late July 2019 Air Namibia, which ceased operations in February 2021, moved its Lüderitz and Oranjemund operations from Hosea Kutako International Airport to Eros. It is also home to the Gambian Government Air Transport Unit.

== Facilities ==
The airport resides at an elevation of 5,575 feet (1,699 m) above mean sea level. It has two asphalt paved runways: 01/19 is the primary runway measuring 2,229 by 30 metres (7,313 ft × 98 ft) and 09/27 is the secondary runway measuring 1,005 m × 30 m (3,297 ft × 98 ft). Other facilities on offer include car rentals, retail, food and beverages, advertising and aircraft hangars. The aerodrome reference code is 3C. The aerodrome Rescue and Fire Fighting has a Category 4 certification.

== Airlines and destinations ==
=== Passenger ===
The following airlines operate regular scheduled services at the airport:

Airlines	Destinations
FlyNamibia	Lüderitz, Ondangwa, Oranjemund, Rundu

Additionally, there are several minor charter operators based there.

=== Cargo ===
Airlines	Destinations
Bay Air Aviation	Johannesburg-O.R. Tambo

== Accidents and incidents ==
- In January 2008, a Cessna 210 crashed after takeoff killing the pilot and all 6 tourists on board. The accident was ruled to be caused by pilot error, according to the Directorate of Aircraft Accident Investigations.

== See also ==
- List of airports in Namibia
- Transport in Namibia
