= Cessna 210 Centurion =

Six seat retractable gear single-engine general aviation aircraft

Cessna 210
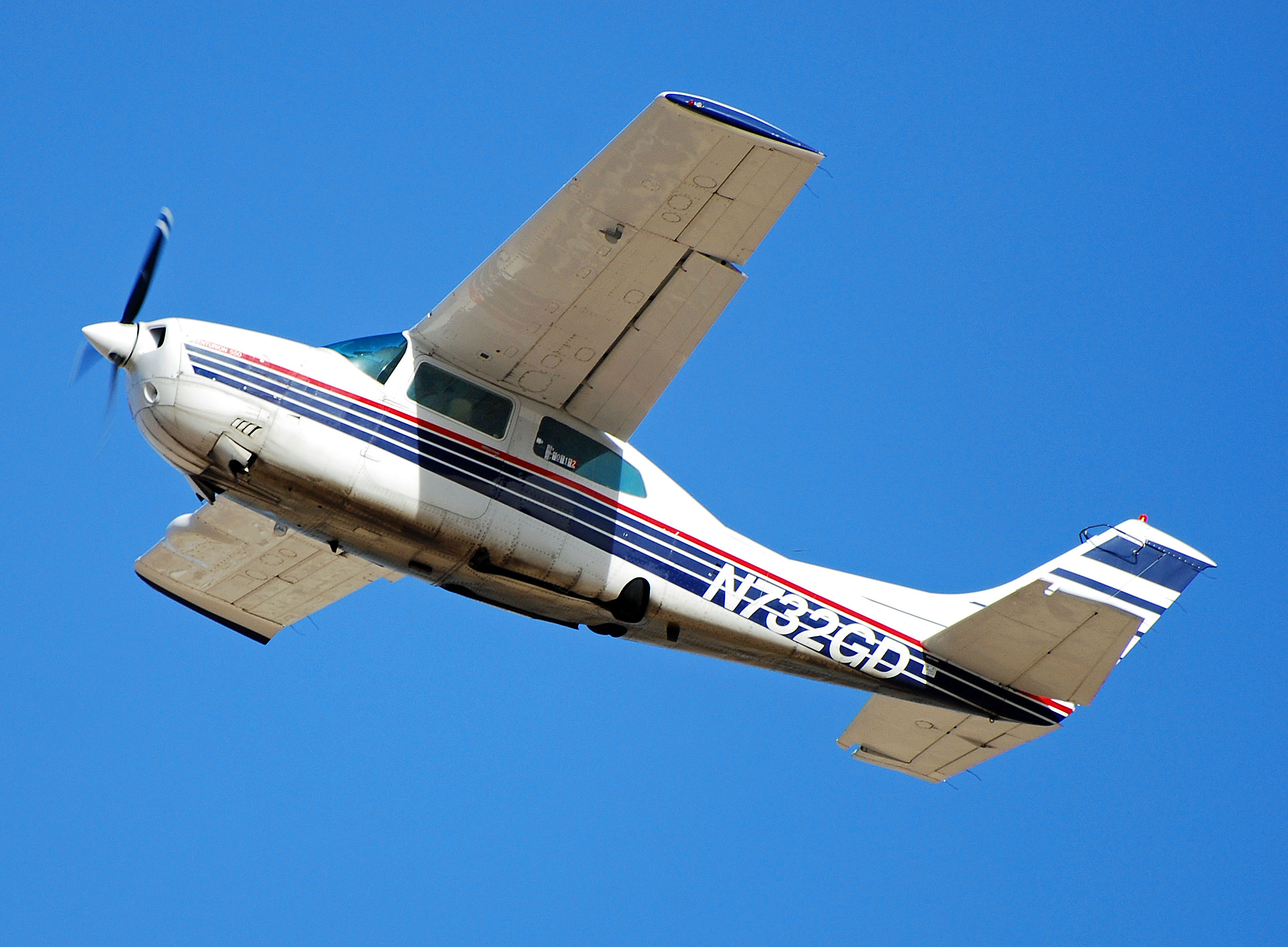
- The Cessna 210 is a high-wing, single engine aircraft with a retractable gear

General information
- Type: Light aircraft
- National origin: United States
- Manufacturer: Cessna
- Number built: 9,240

History
- Manufactured: 1957–1986
- Introduction date: 1957
- First flight: January 1957
- Developed from: Cessna 182 Skylane
- Developed into: Cessna 205/206/207

The Cessna 210 Centurion is a six-seat, high-performance, retractable-gear, single-engined, high-wing general-aviation light aircraft. First flown in January 1957, it was produced by Cessna until 1986.

== Development ==
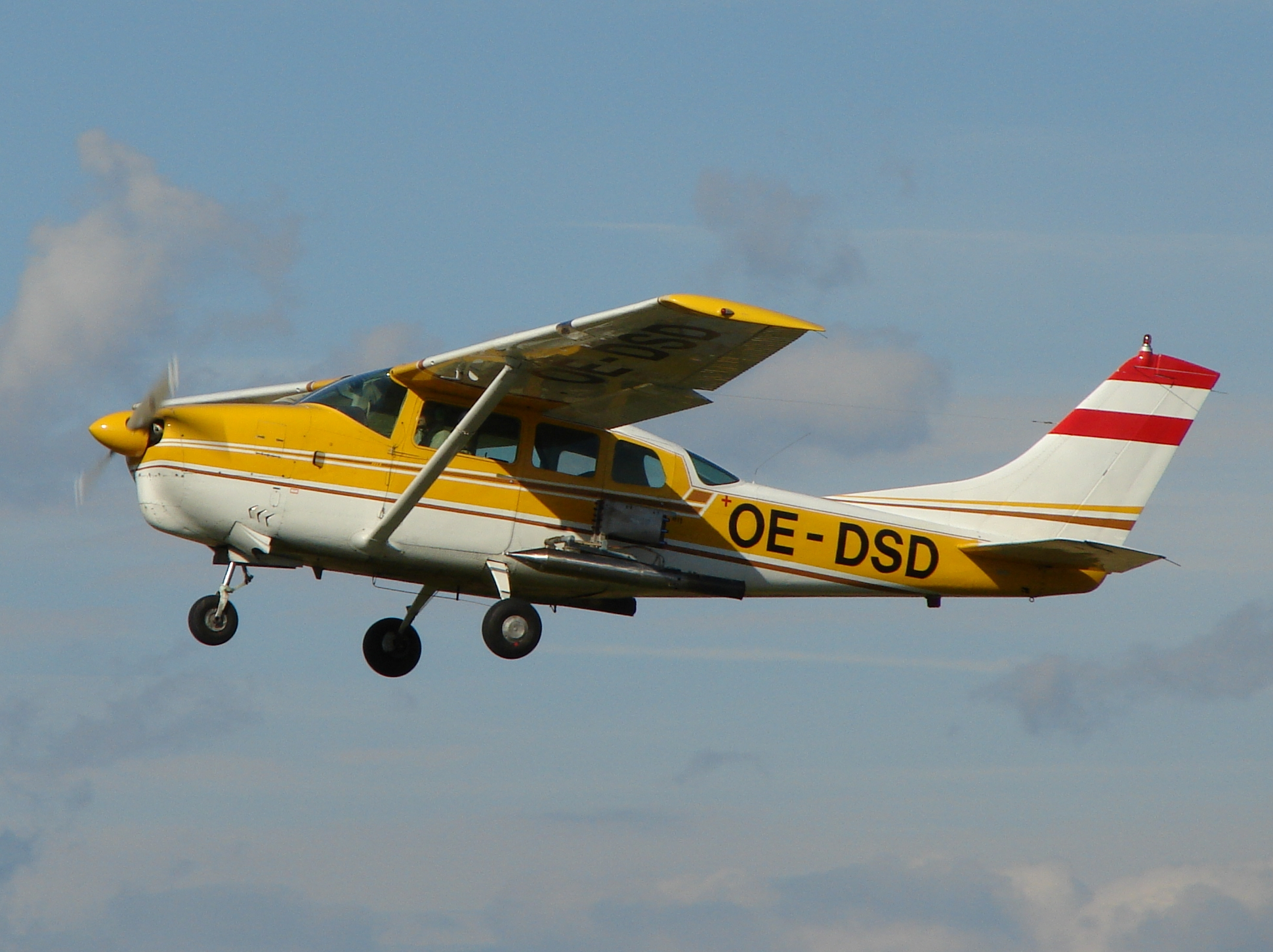
Early model with strut-braced wing and flat leaf springs undercarriage

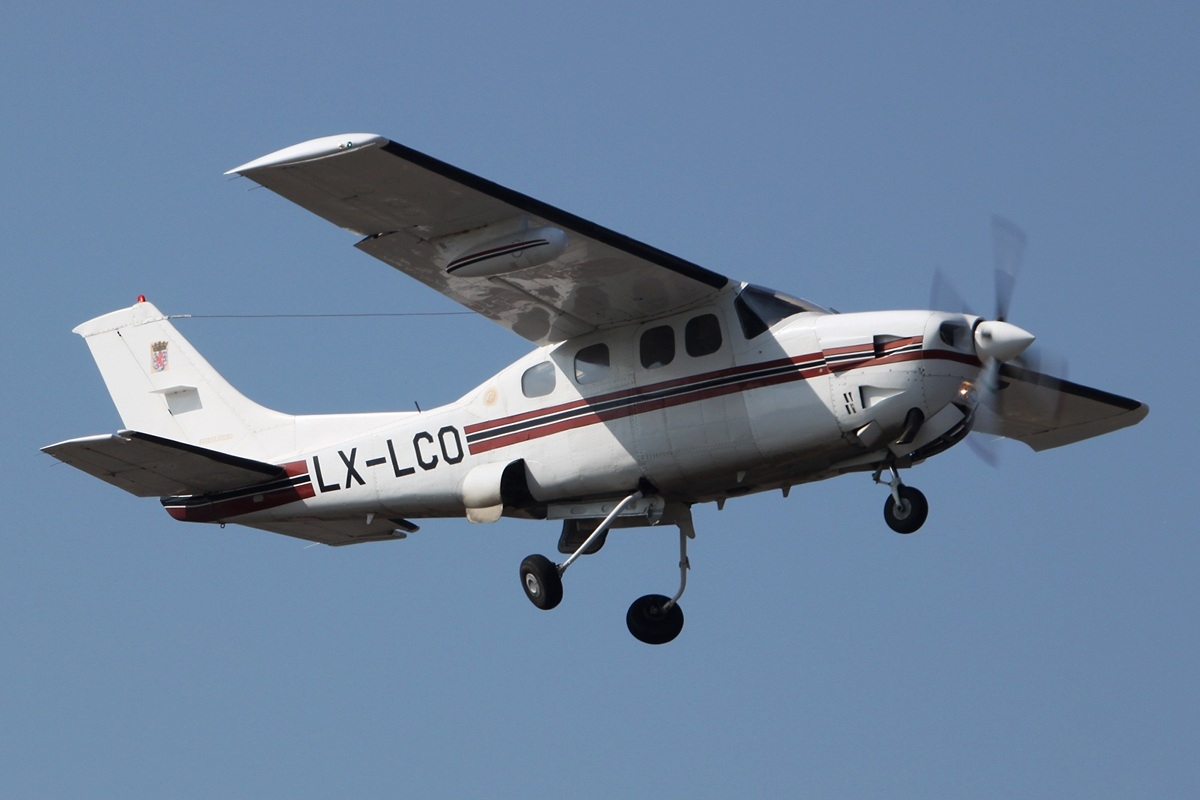
Later model with strutless cantilever wing, pressurized with distinctive small windows, and tubular steel struts undercarriage

The early Cessna 210 (210 and 210A) had four seats with a Continental IO-470 engine of 260 hp (190 kW). It was essentially a Cessna 182B to which was added a retractable landing gear, swept tail, and a new wing.

In 1961, the fuselage and wing were completely redesigned: the fuselage was made wider and deeper, and a third side window was added. The wing planform remained the same; constant 64-inch (1.6 m) chord from centerline to 100 inches (2.5 m) out, then straight taper to 44-inch (1.1 m) chord at 208 inches (5.3 m) from centerline, but the semi-Fowler flaps (slotted, rear-moving) were extended outboard, from wing station 100 to Wing station 122, which allowed a lower landing speed. FAA certification regulations state that a single-engined aircraft must have a flaps-down, power-off stall speed no greater than 70 miles per hour (110 km/h). To compensate for the reduced aileron span, the aileron profile was changed and its chord enlarged.

The 1964 model 210D introduced a 285 hp (213 kW) engine and two small child seats, set into the cavity that contained the mainwheels aft of the passengers.

In 1967, the model 210G introduced a cantilever wing replacing the strut-braced wing. Its planform changed to a constant taper from root chord to tip chord.

In 1970, the 210K became the first full six-seat model. This was achieved by replacing the flat leaf springs used for the retractable main landing gear struts (undercarriage) with tapered tubular steel struts of greater length. This allowed the tires to be nested farther to the rear of the fuselage, making room for the full-sized rear seats. The Centurion II was an option introduced in 1970 with improved avionics, and was available in both normally aspirated and turbocharged versions (Turbo Centurion II)

In 1979, the 210N model eliminated the folding doors, which previously covered the two retracted main wheels. The tubular spring struts retract into shallow channels along the bottom of the fuselage and the wheels fit snugly in closed depressions on the underside of the fuselage. Some models featured deicing boots as an option.

== Design ==
The aircraft was offered in a normally aspirated version, the model 210, as well as the turbocharged T210 and the pressurized P210 versions.

== Operational history ==
On May 21, 2012, the airworthiness authority responsible for the design, the US Federal Aviation Administration, issued an Emergency Airworthiness Directive requiring 3,665 of the cantilever-wing Cessna 210s to be inspected for cracks in the spar cap, wing spar, and wing. Aircraft with more than 10,000 hours of airframe time were grounded immediately pending a visual inspection.

On May 26, 2019, a Cessna Model T210M airplane suffered an in-flight separation of the right wing. Preliminary investigations found cracking of the wing-spar carry-through where fatigue began from a small corrosion pit on the lower surface of the carry-through. Textron published a mandatory service letter (SEL-57-06) on June 24, 2019, to provide instructions for a detailed visual inspection of the wing carry-through spar. Since it shared a common carry-through design, the Cessna 177 Cardinal also received a similar mandatory service letter (SELF-57-07) and an airworthiness concern from the FAA. The FAA issued an Airworthiness Directive on February 21, 2020 mandating eddy current inspections of the carry-through spar lower cap, corrective action if necessary, application of a protective coating and corrosion inhibiting compound, and reporting the inspection results to the FAA.

=== Modifications ===
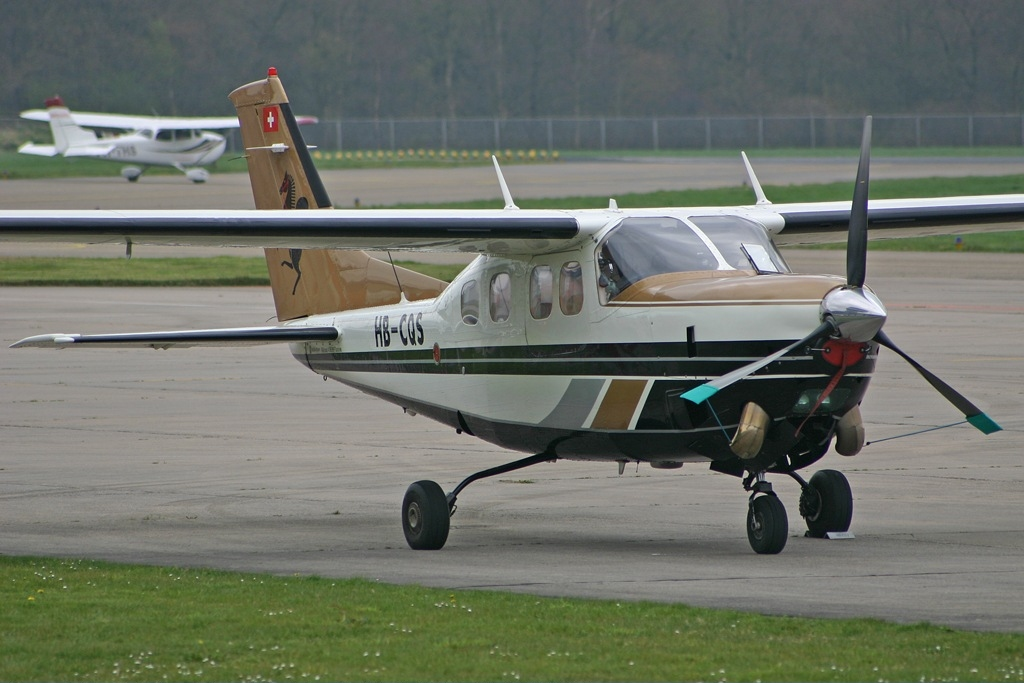
A turbine conversion with an Allison 250

A wide range of modifications are available for the Cessna 210, including:

- Aeronautical Engineers Australia has developed a life extension package for 210s suffering from wing-spar carry-through beam corrosion.
- Crownair Aviation developed a Centurion Edition T210, which is a remanufactured aircraft introduced in November 2008 that features a glass cockpit and new engine along with other minor refinements.
- Griggs Aircraft Refinishing offers a Rolls-Royce Model 250 turboprop conversion of the T210 and P210N known as the "Silver Eagle". This conversion was previously offered by O&N Aircraft
- Riley Rocket offers a restoration and addition of intercooler to Continental TSIO-520 models to boost power from 310 to 340 hp (230 to 250 kW).
- Vitatoe Aviation offers the TN550 conversion which uses a Continental IO-550P engine with an IO-520 turbocharger with dual intercoolers and a larger alternator.

== Variants ==
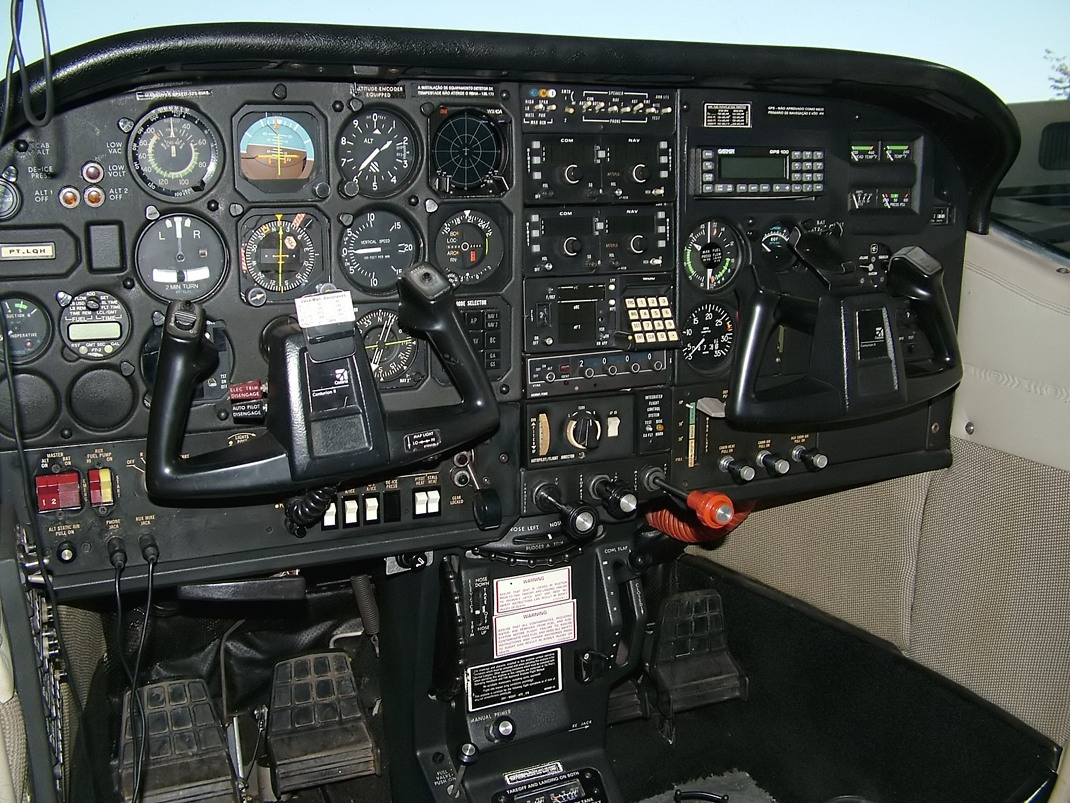
210N instrument panel

The Cessna 210 was manufactured in 26 model variants: C210, C210A-D, the Centurion C210E-H&J, Turbo Centurion T210F-H&J, the Centurion II C210K-N&R, the Turbo Centurion II T210K-N&R and the P210N&R. The 210N, T210N (turbocharged), and P210N (pressurized) versions were produced in the greatest quantity. The rarest and most expensive models were the T210R and P210R, which were produced only in small quantities in 1985-86. Several modifications and optional fittings are also available, including different engine installations, wingtip tanks, speed brakes, STOL kits, and gear door modifications.

The early strut-winged Cessna 210B was developed into a fixed-gear aircraft known as the Cessna 205. This spawned an entirely new family of Cessna aircraft, including the 206 and the eight-seat 207.

210
Four-seat production variant with a Continental IO-470-E engine, 40 degree hydraulic flaps, gear doors, introduced in 1960, first flown in 1957, 575 built.,
210A
A 210 with a third cabin window on each side, production year 1961, 265 built.
210B
A 210A with a cut-down rear fuselage, a rear-vision window and a Continental IO-470-S engine, production year 1962, 245 built.
210C
A 210B with some minor changes, production year 1963, 135 built.
210D Centurion
A 210C fitted with a 285 hp (213 kW) Continental IO-520-A engine and increased takeoff weight to 3,100 lb (1,406 kg), production year 1964, 290 built.
210E Centurion
A 210D with some minor changes, production year 1965, 205 built.
210F Centurion / Turbo Centurion
A 210E with some minor changes and with option to use 285 hp (213 kW) turbocharged Continental TSIO-520-C engine, production year 1966, 300 built.
210G Centurion / Turbo Centurion
A 210F with a strutless cantilever wing and modified rear window, increased takeoff weight to 3,400 lb (1,542 kg), production year 1967, 228 built.
210H Centurion / Turbo Centurion
A 210G with a new flap system and instrument panel, 210 built. Flap range decreased to 30 degrees, fuel capacity increased from 65 to 90 US gal (54 to 75 imp gal; 246 to 341 L). Production year 1968.
210J Centurion / Turbo Centurion
A 210H with reduced wing dihedral, different nose profile and a Continental IO-520-J (or TSIO-520H) engine, production year 1969, 200 built.
210K Centurion / Turbo Centurion
A 210J with rear changed to full seat to provide six seats, an IO-520-L engine, landing gear changed, enlarged cabin with a single rear side window, weight increased to 3,800 lb (1,724 kg), production years 1970-1971, 303 built.
210L Centurion / Turbo Centurion
A 210K with nose-mounted landing lights, the electrical system changed to 24 volt, the engine-driven hydraulic pump replaced with an electrical pump and a three-bladed prop fitted. Improved aerodynamics led to an increase in approximately 8 kn (9 mph; 15 km/h) in cruise speed. Production years 1972–1976, 2070 built.
210M Centurion / Turbo Centurion
A 210L with minor changes and option to use 310 hp (231 kW) TSIO-520-R engine, production year 1977-1978, 1381 built.
210N Centurion / Turbo Centurion
A 210M with open wheel wells for main landing gear and had a new gear system and minor changes. Although this change appeared only on the C210N, most early models have had gear doors removed due to extensive maintenance and handling problems, leaving them similar to the "N". Production years 1979-1985, 1943 built.
210R Centurion / Turbo Centurion
A 210N with longer-span stabilizers and minor changes, production year 1986, 112 built.
P210N Pressurized Centurion
A Turbo 210N with pressurized cabin, four windows each side, with a 310 hp (231 kW) Continental TSIO-520-AF engine, production years 1978–1985, 834 built.
P210R Pressurized Centurion
A P210N with longer-span stabilizers, increased takeoff weight and a 325 hp (242 kW) Continental TSIO-520-CE engine, production year 1986, 40 built.
Prop Jet Centurion 250
Cessna turboprop conversion of P210 powered by Allison 250-B17 engine. One converted, flying in 1984. No production.
Riley Turbine P-210
Conversion of pressurized Cessna 210P Centurion aircraft, fitted with a Pratt & Whitney Canada PT6A-112, flat rated at 500 shp (373 kW). No production.
Silver Eagle II
Turboprop conversion of 210L, T210L or P210N by O&N Aircraft and from 2016, Griggs Aircraft Refinishing. Powered by 450 shp (336 kW) Allison 250-B17 engine. Available from 1992. 114 conversions by 2023.

== Operators ==
side view

=== Civil ===
The Cessna 210 is widely used by flight training schools, private operators, air-taxi and commercial charter, and private companies.

=== Military ===
Bolivia

- Fuerza Aérea Boliviana - five as of 1986

Dominican Republic

- Dominican Air Force - two 210Ls in late 1980s.

El Salvador
Honduras

- Honduran Air Force

Jamaica

- Jamaica Defence Force - two 210Ms acquired, one in 1983 and one in 1989.

Mexico

- Mexican Air Force

Philippines

- Philippine Air Force - four as of 1986

Panama

- Panamanian Public Forces - one T210N in 1980s

Paraguay

- Paraguayan Air Force - two 210Ns
- Paraguayan Naval Aviation - two 210Ns

== Accidents and incidents ==
- On July 12, 1968, Leonard Bendicks hijacked a Cessna 210 from Key West, Florida to Cuba. He was deported to the US in September 1968. On March 4, 1971, he was sentenced to 10 years for kidnapping.
- On August 9, 1981, a Cessna 210M, VH-MDX crashed around the Barrington Tops National Park in New South Wales, killing all five on board. The Australian Transport Safety Bureau report mentions icing, violent weather, and instrument failure.
- On March 5, 1987, a Cessna 210M, N1230M, piloted by car dealer and race car driver Don Yenko, landed hard near Charleston, West Virginia, bounced, hit a dirt bank, and crashed into a ravine, killing all four people aboard.
- While flying N6579X, an early-model 210A, famed test pilot Scott Crossfield crashed and died in the woods of Ludville, Georgia, on April 19, 2006. The National Transportation Safety Board established the probable cause as "[t]he pilot's failure to obtain updated en route weather information, which resulted in his continued instrument flight into a widespread area of severe convective activity, and the air traffic controller's failure to provide adverse weather avoidance assistance, as required by Federal Aviation Administration directives, both of which led to the airplane's encounter with a severe thunderstorm and subsequent loss of control."
- Wilderness Air had a fatal Cessna 210 accident in April 2010. The aircraft apparently broke up in mid air during a flight from Damaraland to Swakopmund, Namibia. The pilot, the sole occupant of the aircraft, was killed.
- On May 26, 2019, about 25 km north‑east of Mount Isa Airport in Australia, the right wing separated from a Cessna T210M. The structural failure led to a rapid loss of control and a collision with terrain. Both crew members were killed, and the aircraft was destroyed. The Australian Transport Safety Bureau (ATSB) found that a pre-existing fatigue crack in the aircraft's wing spar carry-through structure propagated to a critical size resulting in an overstress fracture of the structure and separation of the right wing. The accident resulted in the issue of an airworthiness directive mandating visual and eddy current inspections of the carry-through spar lower cap and the application of a protective coating, plus a corrosion inhibiting compound. The ATSB stated that this accident would not have occurred if previously mandated inspections, due to past wing failures, had not been extended to be required only every three years. Following this crash a new service bulletin was issued and an FAA Airworthiness Directive, but inspections remained as every three years. The ATSB recommended more action to prevent future wing failures.

== Specifications (T210N Turbo Centurion II) ==
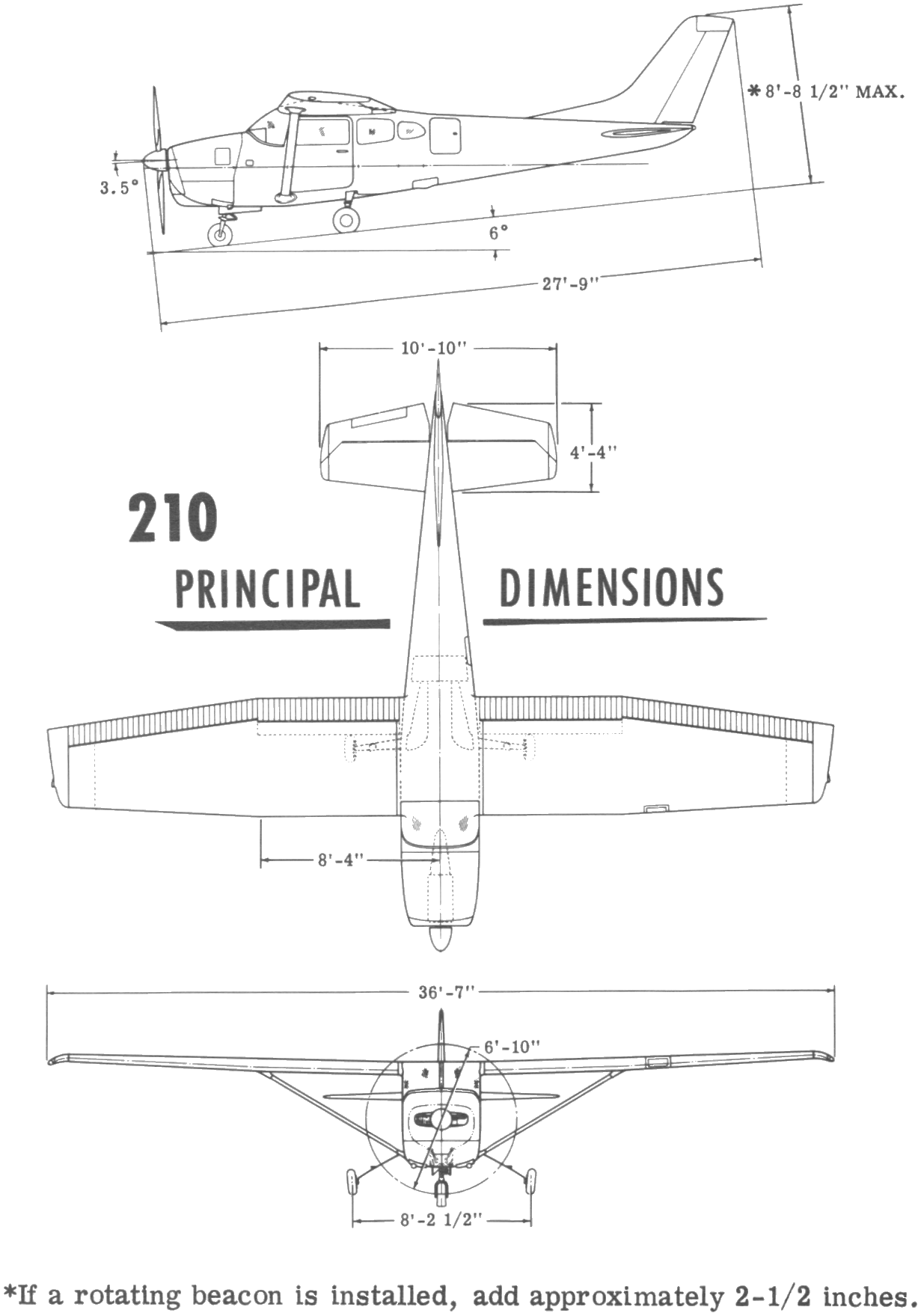
3-view line drawing of the Cessna 210A

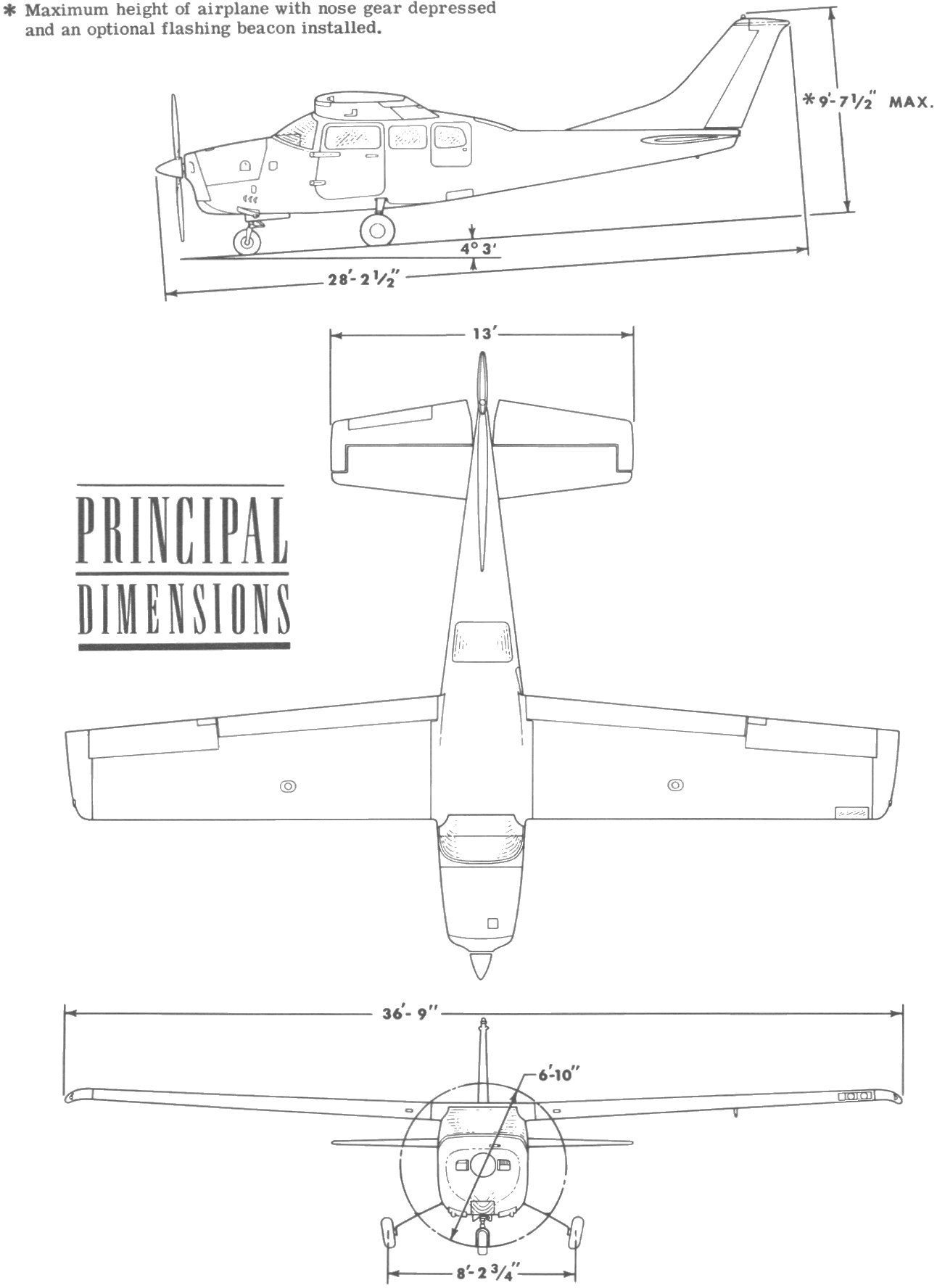
3-view line drawing of the Cessna 210H Centurion

Data from Janes' All The World's Aircraft 1982-83

General characteristics

- Crew: One
- Capacity: Five passengers
- Length: 28 ft 2 in (8.59 m)
- Wingspan: 36 ft 9 in (11.20 m)
- Height: 9 ft 8 in (2.95 m)
- Wing area: 175 sq ft (16.3 m^{2})
- Empty weight: 2,303 lb (1,045 kg)
- Gross weight: 4,000 lb (1,814 kg)
- Fuel capacity: 87 US gal (72 imp gal; 330 L) (usable capacity)
- Powerplant: 1 × Continental Motors TSIO-520-R air-cooled turbocharged flat-six, 310 hp (230 kW)
- Propellers: 3-bladed McCauley Type D3A34C402/90DFA-10 constant-speed propeller, 7 ft 6 in (2.29 m) diameter

Performance

- Maximum speed: 204 kn (235 mph, 378 km/h) at 17,000 ft (5,200 m)
- Cruise speed: 193 kn (222 mph, 357 km/h) at 20,000 ft (6,100 m) (80% power)
- Stall speed: 58 kn (67 mph, 107 km/h) (power off, flaps down) (CAS)
- Range: 900 nmi (1,000 mi, 1,700 km) at 10,000 ft (3,000 m) (econ cruise)
- Service ceiling: 27,000 ft (8,200 m)
- Rate of climb: 930 ft/min (4.7 m/s)
- Takeoff distance to 50 ft (15 m): 2,160 ft (660 m)
- Landing distance from 50 ft (15 m): 1,500 ft (460 m)

== See also ==
Related development

- Cessna 182
- Cessna 206

Aircraft of comparable role, configuration, and era

- Beechcraft Bonanza
- Piper Saratoga
- Piper Malibu
