= Rundu Airport =

Airport in Kavango, Namibia

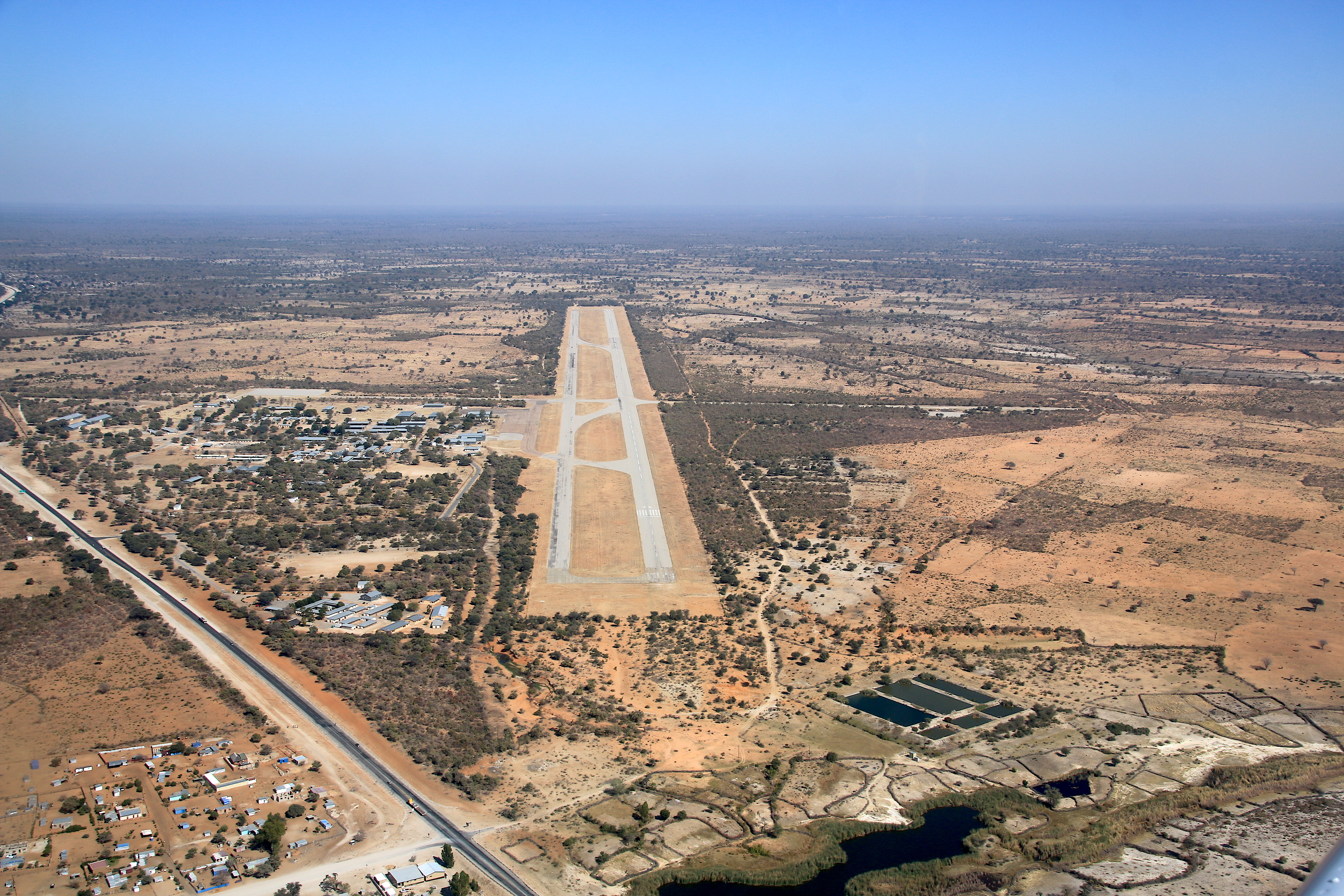
- IATA: NDU; ICAO: FYRU

Summary
- Airport type: Public
- Owner/Operator: Namibia Airports Co.
- Serves: Rundu, Namibia
- Elevation AMSL: 3,627 ft / 1,106 m
- Coordinates: 17°57′20″S 19°43′25″E

Map
- Location of airport in Namibia

Runways
| Direction | Length | | Surface |
| Direction | m | ft | Surface |
|---|---|---|---|
| 08/26 | 3,055 | 10,023 | Asphalt |
- Rwy 18/36 Closed Sources: Namibia Airports Co., Google Maps

Rundu Airport (IATA: NDU, ICAO: FYRU) is an airport serving Rundu, the capital of the Kavango Region in Namibia. The airport is 6 kilometres (3.7 mi) southwest of the center of Rundu.

Runway 26 has an additional 300 metres (980 ft) of displaced threshold available for takeoff. There are no IFR procedures or equipment, but navigation is supported by an NDB north of the airport, across the border in Angola.

== Airlines and destinations ==
The following airlines operate regular scheduled services at the airport:

| Airlines | Destinations |
|---|---|
| FlyNamibia | Windhoek–Eros |

== Statistics ==
Rundu Airport handled 843 passengers in 2025. As all other regional airports in Namibia, it operates at a loss.

== See also ==
- List of airports in Namibia
- Transport in Namibia
