= Andimba Toivo ya Toivo Airport =

Airport in Namibia

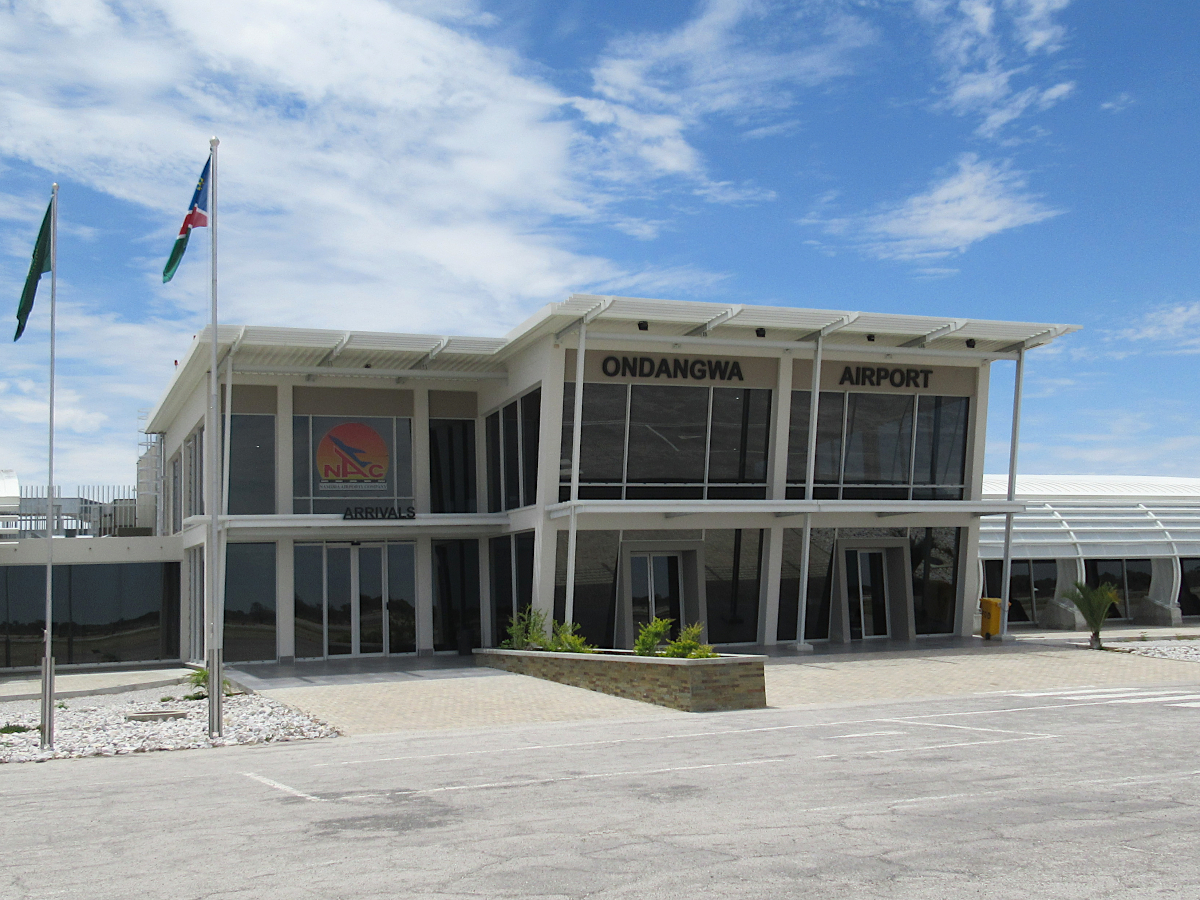
- IATA: OND; ICAO: FYOA

Summary
- Airport type: Public
- Owner/Operator: Namibia Airports Co.
- Serves: Ondangwa, Namibia
- Elevation AMSL: 3,599 ft / 1,097 m
- Coordinates: 17°52′41″S 15°57′09″E

Map
- Location of airport in Namibia

Runways
Direction	Length		Surface
Direction	m	ft	Surface
08/26	2,987	9,800	Asphalt
- Sources: Namibia Airports Co., DAFIF GCM

Andimba Toivo ya Toivo Airport, formerly known as Ondangwa Airport, (IATA: OND, ICAO: FYOA) is an airport serving Ondangwa, a town in the Oshana Region of Namibia. The airport is about 5 km (3 mi) northwest of the center of Ondangwa.

The Ondangwa non-directional beacon (Ident: OA) is located on the field.

== Airlines and destinations ==
The following airlines operate regular scheduled services at the airport:

Airlines	Destinations
FlyNamibia	Windhoek–Eros

== Statistics ==
Andimba Toivo ya Toivo is the busiest regional airport in Namibia. 23,960 passengers were handled here in 2025. However, as all other regional airports in Namibia, it operates at a loss.

== See also ==
- List of airports in Namibia
- Transport in Namibia
