= Lüderitz Airport =

Airport in Namibia

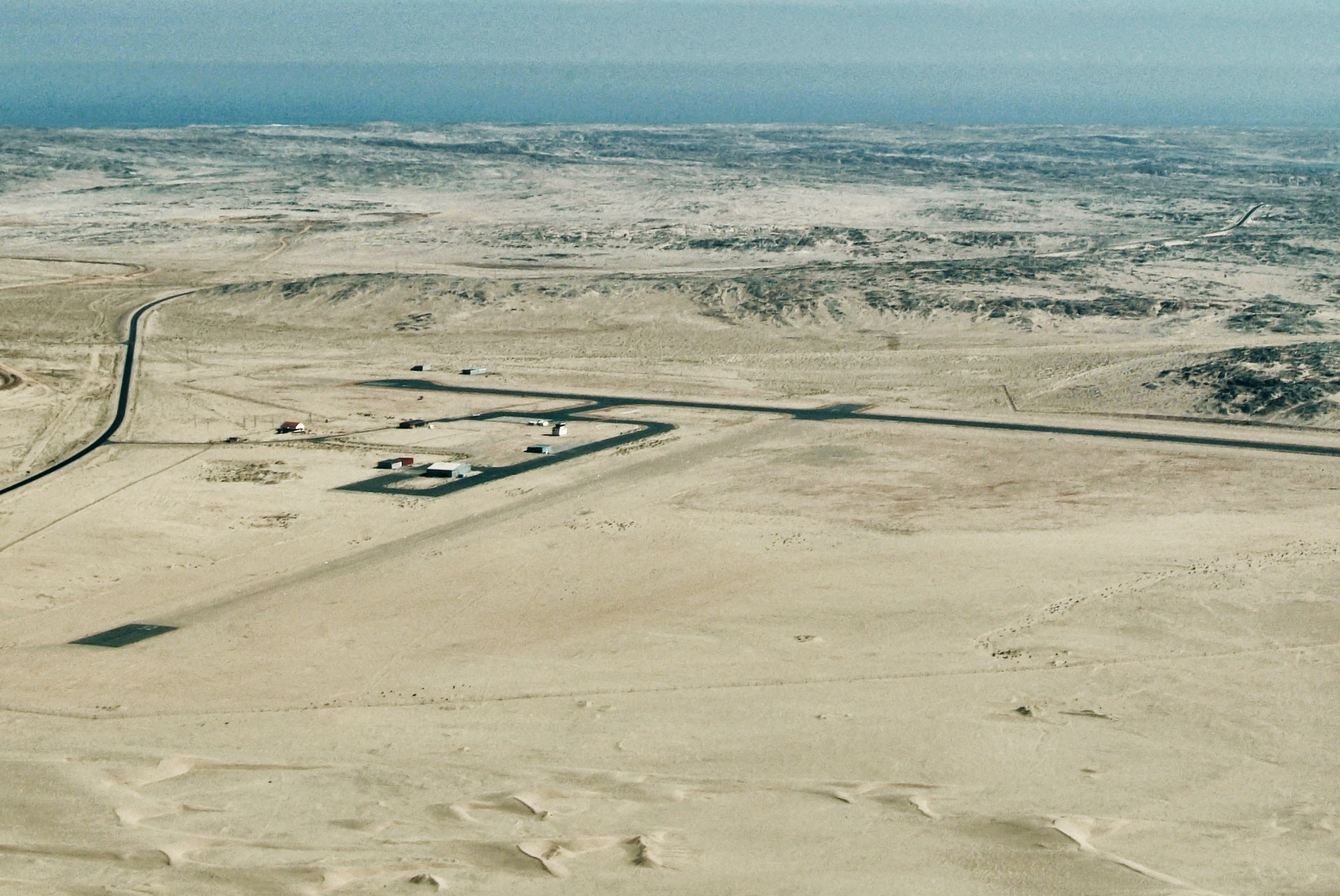
- IATA: LUD; ICAO: FYLZ

Summary
- Airport type: Public
- Owner/Operator: Namibia Airports Co.
- Serves: Lüderitz, Namibia
- Elevation AMSL: 457 ft (139 m)
- Coordinates: 26°41′15″S 15°14′35″E

Map
- Location in Namibia

Runways
| Direction | Length | | Surface |
| Direction | m | ft | Surface |
|---|---|---|---|
| 04/22 | 1,830 | 6,004 | Asphalt |
| 12/30 | 1,205 | 3,953 | Gravel |

Statistics (2006)
- Aircraft Movements: 3,804
- Passengers: 15,694
- Cargo: 12 ton
- Sources: Namibia Airports Co. WAD GCM

Lüderitz Airport (IATA: LUD, ICAO: FYLZ) is an airport serving Lüderitz, a town in the ǁKaras Region of Namibia. The airport is about 9 km (6 mi) southeast of the center of Lüderitz, on the B4 road.

In May 2025, the government reportedly sought N$28.8 million allocation for feasibility studies to upgrade infrastructure at several airports, including consideration of renovation and upgrade at Lüderitz airport.

== Airlines and destinations ==
| Airlines | Destinations |
|---|---|
| FlyNamibia | Windhoek–Eros |

== Statistics ==
Lüderitz Airport handled 16,060 passengers in 2025. However, as all other regional airports in Namibia, it operates at a loss.

== See also ==
- List of airports in Namibia
- Transport in Namibia
