= Katima Mulilo Airport =

Airport in Zambezi Region, Namibia

Katima Mulilo Airport Mpacha Airport
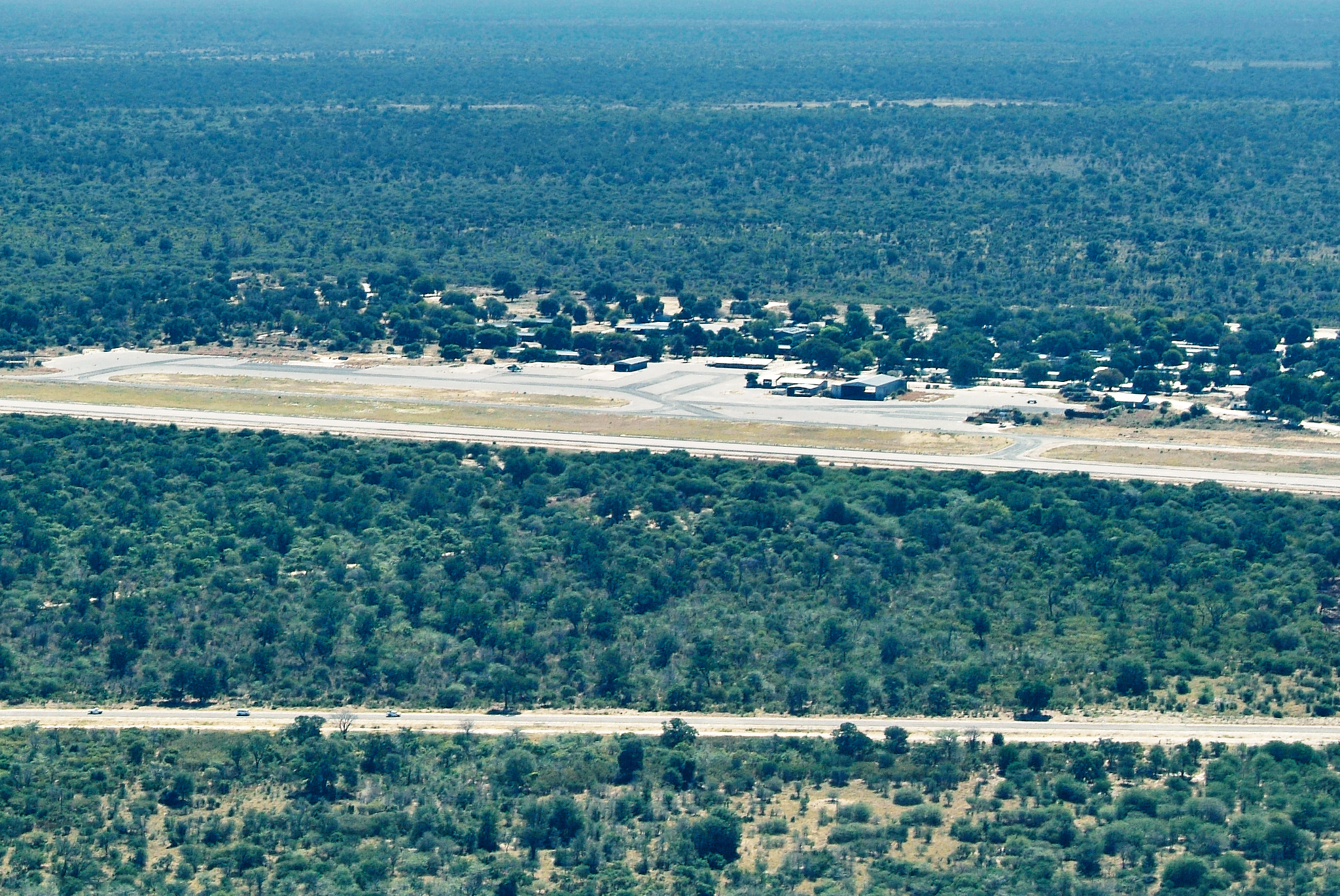
- IATA: MPA; ICAO: FYKM

Summary
- Airport type: Public
- Owner/Operator: Namibia Airports Co.
- Serves: Katima Mulilo, Namibia
- Elevation AMSL: 3,144 ft (958 m)
- Coordinates: 17°38′00″S 24°10′50″E

Map
- Location within Namibia

Runways
Direction	Length		Surface
Direction	m	ft	Surface
09/27	2,295	7,530	Asphalt
- Source: WAD GCM Google Maps

Katima Mulilo Airport (IATA: MPA, ICAO: FYKM, formerly FYMP), also known as Mpacha Airport, serves Katima Mulilo, the capital of the Zambezi Region in Namibia. The airport is on the B8 road, about 18 km (11 mi) southwest of the centre of Katima Mulilo. The Katima Mulilo non-directional beacon (Ident: KL) is located on the field.

== Airlines and destinations ==
Airlines	Destinations
FlyNamibia	Windhoek–Hosea Kutako; Seasonal: Maun

== Statistics ==
Katima Mulilo Airport handled 3,342 passengers in 2025. As all other regional airports in Namibia, it operates at a loss.

== See also ==
- List of airports in Namibia
- Transport in Namibia
