= Walvis Bay International Airport =

Airport serving Walvis Bay, Namibia

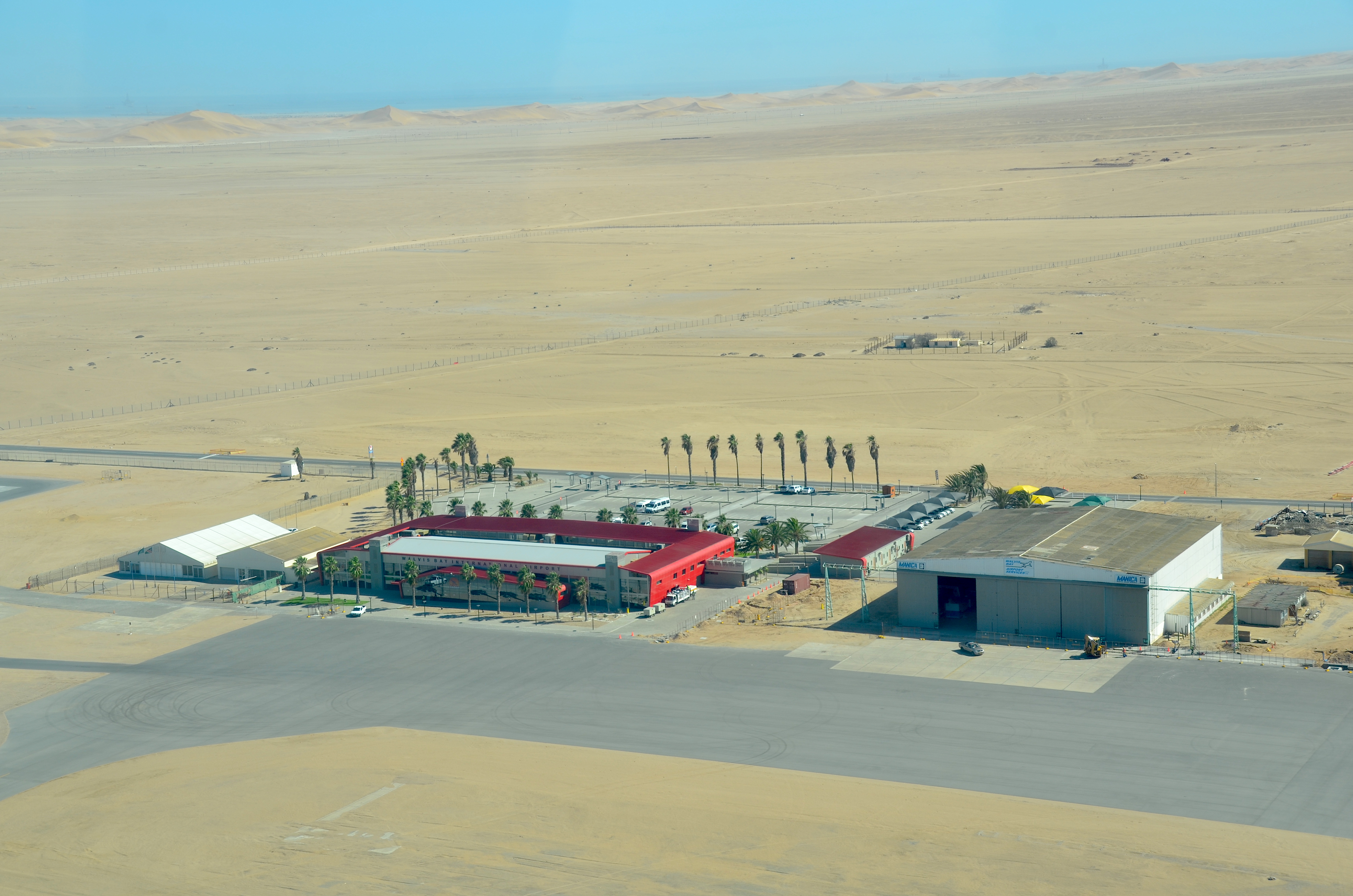
- IATA: WVB; ICAO: FYWB

Summary
- Airport type: Public
- Owner/Operator: Namibia Airports Co.
- Serves: Walvis Bay, Namibia
- Elevation AMSL: 299 ft (91 m)
- Coordinates: 22°58′47″S 14°38′43″E
- Website: airports.com.na

Map
- Location of the airport in Namibia

Runways
Direction	Length		Surface
Direction	m	ft	Surface
09/27	3,500	11,483	Asphalt

Statistics (2023)
- Passengers: ▲79,763
- Aircraft movements: 17,620
- Sources: Namibia Airports Co., DAFIF

Walvis Bay International Airport (IATA: WVB, ICAO: FYWB) is an airport serving Walvis Bay, a city in the Erongo Region of Namibia. The airport is about 15 km (9 mi) east of the city centre. Walvis Bay International Airport handled more than 98,178 passengers, and logged over 20 000 aircraft movements in 2015.

== History ==
The airport was established as AFB Rooikop, a South African Air Force station (and later as a base) that closed in 1994. It was home to several SAAF squadrons:

- 16 Squadron SAAF: 1939–1940
- 27 Squadron SAAF: 1940s

In April 2018, Westair Aviation operated scheduled services to six new destinations in Namibia and South Africa.

Due to flight performance and headwinds, Airlink in March 2019 decided to redirect its technical fuel-stop in Windhoek to Walvis Bay International Airport, a move which would accommodate more passengers on the final leg to Saint Helena Airport. The airline resumed its Johannesburg service to the island in late March 2022, again landing in Walvis Bay briefly for re-fueling purposes.

== Facilities ==
The airport resides at an elevation of 299 feet (91 m) above mean sea level. It has one runway designated 09/27 with an asphalt surface measuring 3,500 by 30 metres (11,483 ft × 98 ft). The facility complies with International Civil Aviation Organisation (ICAO) standards. Included with the rehabilitation of the airport was the construction of a polymer perimeter fence which protects the facility from coastal weather conditions. This addition was the first of its kind for the country.

== Upgrades ==
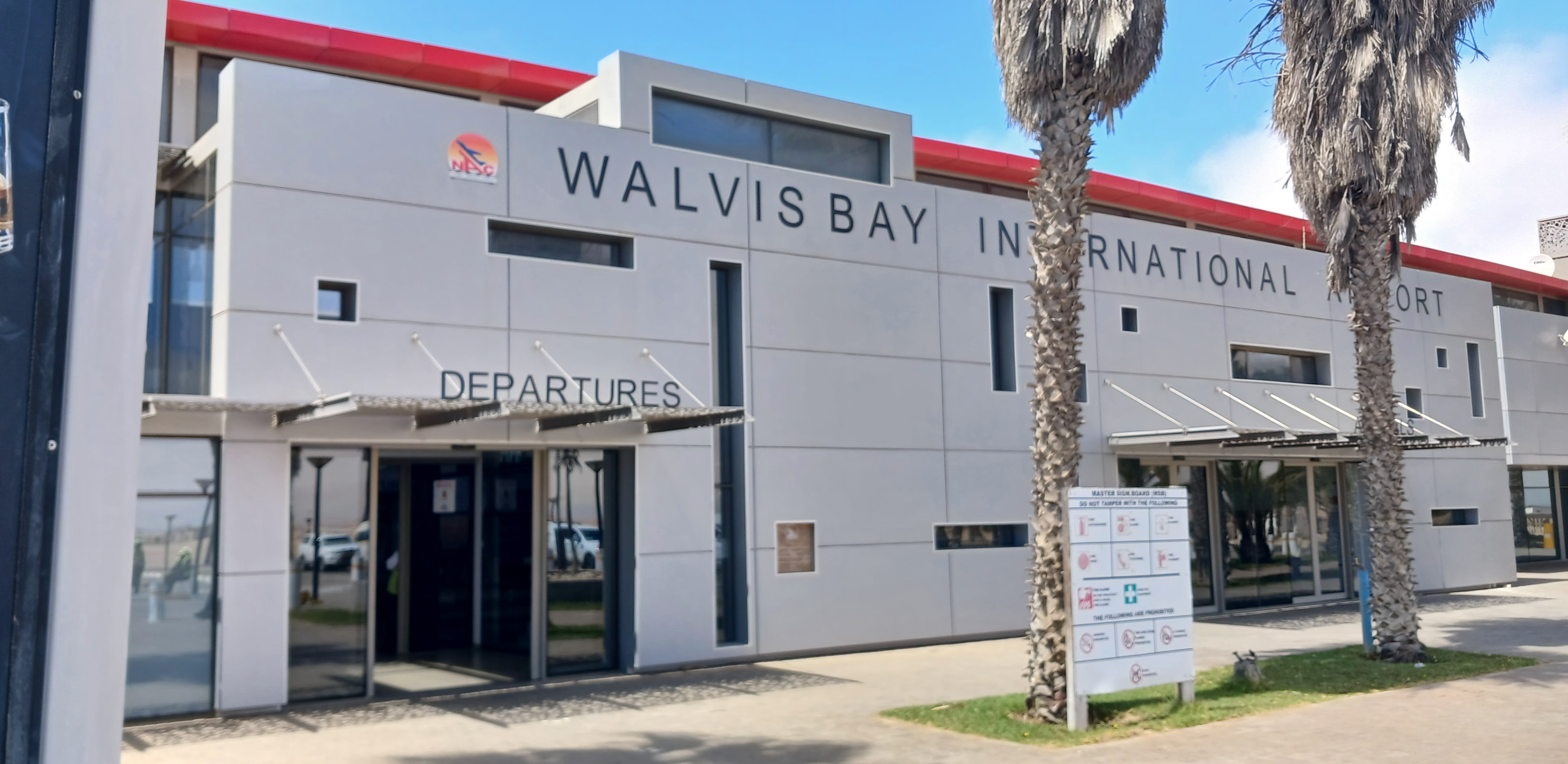
Walvis Bay Airport

Since 2007, the airport has received upgrades to its air traffic control equipment, instrument landing systems, and runway lighting, as well as a runway extension at both ends.

The Walvis Bay Airport hub was set to become the country's second international airport during 2016. The airport provides air freight services, bonded warehouses, cold storage warehouse, space storage depots, freight handling facilities and any service-related industries normally associated with airports.

The new airport features a Category 3C runway, and despite shortening the runway, it is still able to accommodate larger equipment such as the Boeing 737-200, and the larger Airbus A340, which landed at the airport in May 2024. The newly installed avionics (lighting) and landing system allows aircraft movements during poor weather conditions. This feature has placed Walvis Bay Airport at the forefront of airport technology in Southern Africa, especially where coastal, overcast conditions prevail. Namibia Airports Company (NAC) has upgraded the facility, which has the capacity to handle 200 passengers an hour and one million passengers a year. The new terminal, which has been inaugurated in July 2016, meets international standards in terms of operational safety/security and functional efficiency, as well as cargo processing.

== Airlines and destinations ==
The following airlines operate regular scheduled services at the airport:

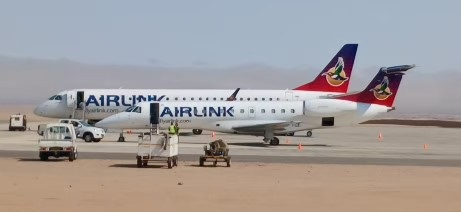
Aircraft on apron

Airlines	Destinations
Airlink	Cape Town, Johannesburg–O. R. Tambo
FlyNamibia	Cape Town

== See also ==
- List of airports in Namibia
- Transport in Namibia
