= Westair Aviation =

Namibian airline

Westair Aviation Limited
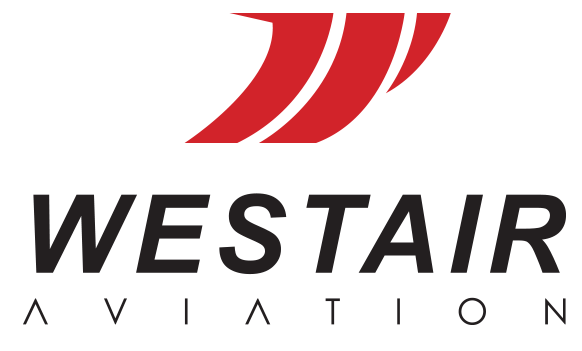
IATA	ICAO	Call sign
WV	WAA	WESTAIR WINGS
- Founded: 1967; 59 years ago Windhoek, Namibia
- Commenced operations: 1967
- Hubs: Windhoek-Eros
- Frequent-flyer program: Frequent Flyer
- Fleet size: 30
- Destinations: 10
- Headquarters: Windhoek, Namibia
- Key people: Henry van Schalkwyk (CEO)
- Employees: 280 (March 2020)
- Website: westair.com.na

Westair Aviation Limited is a Namibian aviation service provider and airline offering scheduled passenger services under the FlyNamibia brand as well as cargo and Aircraft, Crew, Maintenance and Insurance (ACMI) services based at Eros Airport in Windhoek.

== History ==
In 1967, Westair Aviation began as an aircraft maintenance facility and has since become a passenger and freight aviation company. The airline has become a provider of ad-hoc as well as air chartered services in Namibia, providing long-term lease and aircraft maintenance services. The airline also operates a variety of scheduled and unscheduled air cargo flights and has been offering a dedicated cargo service to DHL over the past 20 years.

In June 2005, Stimulus Investment Limited, a local Namibian investment company, acquired 29% of the total issued ordinary share of Westair Aviation, with the airline's management retaining 71% of the ordinary shares. Stimulus sold the shares back to Westair management in 2014 and is no longer a shareholder in Westair.

In November 2015, Westair Aviation acquired an Embraer ERJ-145 from LOT Polish Airlines. Named 'Tatekulu', this twinjet 50-seater was the first addition to the airlines' specialist fleet.

As of April 2018, the airline planned to expand its passenger route network to five scheduled destinations and six airports in two different countries in Southern Africa. In June 2019, the airline was granted designated carrier status by the Namibian Transport Commission. Scheduled local flights commenced on June 24, 2019, from its base at Eros Airport under the newly established brand name FlyWestair. FlyWestair rebranded as FlyNamibia on 2 November 2021. In September 2019, the airline revealed plans to commence its first international destination by starting flights from Eros Airport to Cape Town. In September 2022, Airlink a South African carrier based in Johannesburg, acquired a 40% equity share in FlyNamibia. The latter plans expansion to Ghana, Malawi, the DRC and Kenya after the demise of the Namibian flag-carrier Air Namibia in 2021. A franchise agreement between Airlink and FlyNamibia was announced in August 2023. Starting 28 August 2023, all FlyNamibia Embraer scheduled flights have operated under Airlink's 4Z code.

In 2020, Westair has invested in Senegalese Arc en Ciel Airlines.

In March 2023, Westair Aviation has created a joint venture with France based Avico Group to take a controlling equity interest in Italian helicopter operator Weststar NDD, renamed later as Westair Helicopters. This airline is flying 14 helicopters, Leonardo AW189, AW139, AW169.

In September 2023, FlyNamibia has joined the International Air Transport Association (IATA).

== Routes ==
As of 2021, Westair Aviation services the following international routes:

From	To	Country
Windhoek-Hosea Kutako	Maun	Botswana
Windhoek-Hosea Kutako	Walvis Bay	Namibia
Windhoek-Hosea Kutako	Cape Town International	South Africa
Windhoek-Hosea Kutako	Victoria Falls	Zimbabwe

As of 2022, FlyNamibia services the following domestic routes:

From	To
Windhoek-Eros	Katima Mulilo
Windhoek-Eros	Lüderitz
Windhoek-Eros	Ondangwa
Windhoek-Eros	Rundu
Windhoek-Eros	Oranjemund

=== Interline agreement ===
FlyNamibia interlines with the following airline/s:

- Fastjet Zimbabwe

== Fleet ==
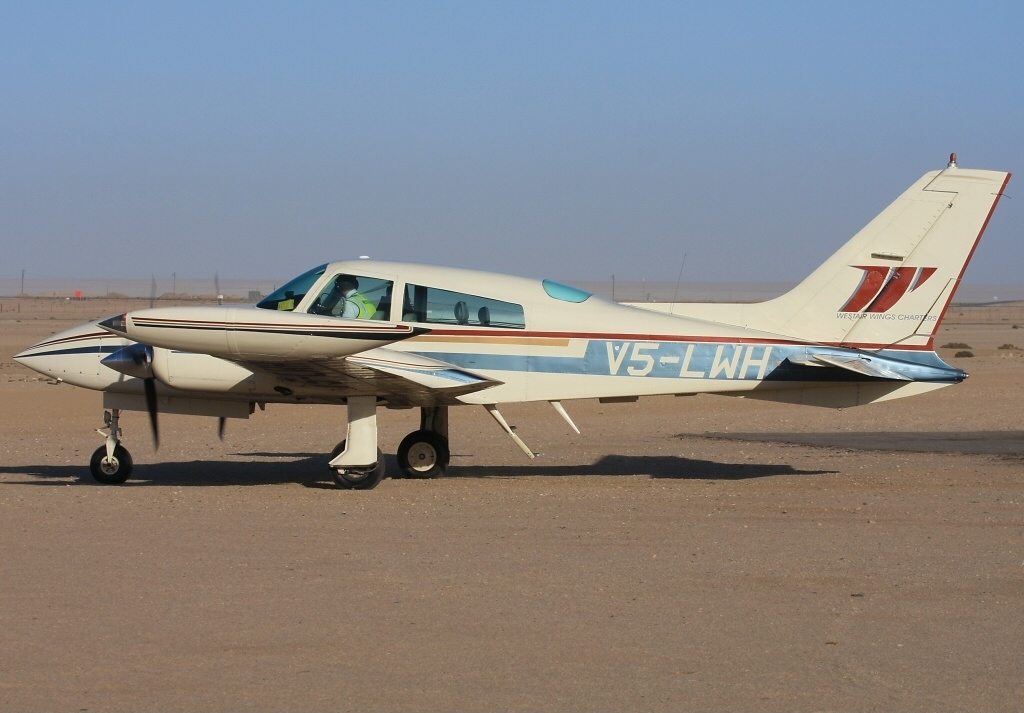
Westair Aviation Cessna 310

Westair Aviation's current fleet consist of over 30 aircraft. The aircraft suit relevant operations such as freight-transporting, crew rotations for mining operations and offering VIP charters to The Namibian government. Westair Aviation's fleet comprises Embraer, Beechcraft and Cessna aircraft with the Embraer ERJ-145 being their largest.

FlyNamibia Safari routes are serviced by a Reims-Cessna F406 Caravan II.
