= Wilderness Air =

Airline of Botswana

IATA	ICAO	Call sign
—	WLD	WILDERNESS
- Founded: 1991
- Operating bases: Maun, Botswana
- Hubs: Maun International Airport
- Fleet size: 22
- Headquarters: Maun, Botswana
- Key people: Kago Paul (General Manager)
- Founders: Neil Lumsden; Suzy Lumsden
- Website: www.wilderness-air.com

Wilderness Air, formerly known as Sefofane Air Charter, is an air charter company headquartered in Botswana, Africa. It operates regularly scheduled and sole-use charter flights, as well as limited cargo operations. It also owns and operates a charity called Children in the Wilderness which offers children in rural areas flights and educates them about their camps and local wildlife. It further operates the first flight simulator in Botswana, to train pilots on the Cessna 208B Grand Caravan.

== History ==
former logo

The company was founded in 1991 as Sefofane Air Charter by Neil and Suzy Lumsden operating one Cessna 206.

The company operates in Botswana, Namibia, South Africa, and Zimbabwe. The airline's main base of operations is in Maun, Botswana.

== Fleet ==
Wilderness operates the following aircraft:

- Cessna 208B Grand Caravan
- Cessna 210 Centurion

== Accidents and incidents ==
The company had a fatal Cessna 210 accident in April 2010. The aircraft apparently broke up in mid air during a flight from Damaraland to Swakopmund, Namibia. The pilot, the sole occupant of the aircraft, was killed.
