= List of defunct airlines of South Africa =

This is a list of defunct airlines of South Africa.

Airline	Image	IATA	ICAO	Callsign	Commenced operations	Ceased operations	Notes
1
1time		T6	RNX	NEXTTIME	2004	2012	Placed under provisional liquidation. Operated 11 McDonnell Douglas MD-80.
A
ACE Express					1996	1997	Merged into Express Air Services
ACORN Air					1990	1990	Operated BAe 146-200
Advanced Aviation Logistics					1990	1990	Rebranded as Aerios Global Aviation
Aero Air Charter					1995	2001	Eyethu Air Cargo merged in 1999
Aerolift					2002	2009	
Aerospace Express					1996	2004	Operated HS 748
Africa Cargo Air					1996	2001	Operated Douglas C-54
Africa Charter Airlines			FSK	AFRICAN SKY	1997	2000	
Africair					1946	1977	Formed by the merger of Anglo Vaal Air Services and Africair Servicing. Operated Douglas DC-3, Douglas DC-4
Africair Servicing					1946	1946	Merged with Anglo Vaal Air Services to form Africair. Operated Douglas DC-3
African Air Carriers					1983	1984	
African Airline Investments			LGE		2010	2010	
African Cargo Airlines					1997	1999	Operated Antonov An-32
African International Airways			AIN	FLY CARGO	1985	2008	
African Star Airways		4M	ASG	AFRICAN STAR	1998	2000	Operated Boeing 747
Africargo Airlines					1998	1998	Established as Transoceanic Airways
Afro Cargo					1986	1987	Operated Sud Aviation Caravelle
Air Cape					1963	1988	Acquired by Safair
Air Lowveld		LE			1971	1978	Merged with Avna Airlines and Mafeking Aviation Services to form Magnum Airlines
Air Midlands					1971	1978	Merged into Airlink Airlines. Operated Cessna 402
Aircraft Operating Company of Africa					1962	1980	Operated Lockheed Lodestar, Douglas DC-3
Airlink Airline		5T	LNK		1992	1994	Renamed to Airlink
AirQuarius Air Charter			AQU	QUARIUS	2001	2007	Established as AirQuarius Aviation. Renamed to Branson Air
AirQuarius Aviation			AQU; SSN	QUARIUS	1999	2001	Renamed to AirQuarius Air Charter
AirWorld					1996	2003	Operated Boeing 727, Douglas DC-3
Alliance Air		Y2	AFJ	JAMBO	1995	2000	Ran at a loss, last flight October 8, 2000. Joint venture between South African Airways, Tanzania and Uganda.
Alpha Airways					1947	1947	
Alpine Aviation			LPC		1996	2010	Operated Bell 206, Bell 407, AS350, Robinson R22, Robinson R44
Anglo Vaal Air Services					1946	1946	Became Africair after merging with Africair Servicing. Operated Douglas DC-3
ATAIR Executive Jet Charters					1980	1998	Operated Beech Super King Air, Cessna Citation V
Avia Air					1994	1995	Went bankrupt. Operated Boeing 747SP, Douglas DC-3, Douglas DC-6
Avia Airlines		GW	AGW	AVIAN	1995	1996	
Avna Airlines		WU			1976	1978	Merged with Air Lowveld and Mafeking Aviation Services to form Magnum Airlines
Avna Airways					1965	1968	Renamed to Avna
B
Bazaruto Air Charter					1990	1992	Operated Douglas C-47
Bop Air		BV	MAW		1979	1994	Rebranded as Sun Air. Operatede Embraer Bandeirante, Embraer Brasilia
Border Air					1966	1980	To Link Airways. Operated Beech Baron, Cessna 402
Branson Air			AQU		2007	2012	Established as AirQuarius Aviation in 1999.
C
Cape Atlantic Air			CAO		1995	1996	
Caprivi Airways					1968	1981	Renamed to African Air Carriers
Care Airlines		CE			1992	1996	Air ambulance services. Renamed to Nationwide Airlines. Operated Hawker Siddeley 748
Carpenter's Charter					1995	2000	
Charlan Air Charter		S8	CAH	CHARLAN	2000	2006	Operated Swearingen Merlin IV, Embraer Brasilia
CHC Air					2002	2008	Operated Convair 580
Ciskei International Airways		CC			1988	1989	Operated Convair 880, Convair 990
Citi Air					1985	1987	To Link Airways. Operated Cessna 310, Cessna 402, Piper Chieftain, Piper Cherokee Six
Civair Airways			CIW	CIVFLIGHT	2004	2004	Operated Boeing 747
Collondale Air Service					1959	1968	Founded by Kenneth Brown. Operated Cessna 175, Cessna 206, Piper Colt, Piper Cherokee Six
Comair (South Africa)		MN	CAW	COMMERCIAL	1943	2022	Was placed under liquidation. Operated 12 Boeing 737.
Comair Charters (Natal)					1989	1993	Rebranded Federal Air
Command Airways		CT	CAH	COMMAND	1977; 1980	1979; 1981	Rebranded as Magnum Airlines Helicopters in 1979 and back Command Airways in 1980
Commercial Air Services					1946	1967	Rebranded Comair. Operated Douglas DC-3, Fairchild 24
Compion Aviation					2003	2014	Operated Beech 1900, Cessna Citation I
Court Air			CUT	COURT AIR	1990s	1990s	Operated Convair 580
D
Debon-Air					1992	2002	
Durban Flying Service					1940s	1940s	
E
Eastern Air		KV	TAK		1995	1997	Operated Let Turbolet
Eastern Air Services					1980	1982	Rebranded as Eastern Airlines. Operated BAC 1-11, Beech Baron, Beech King Air
Eastern Airlines					1982	1994	Established as Eastern Air Services. Operated Beech Baron
ELB Flying Services					1976	2000	Operated Aero Commander 695, Cessna 525
Emric Air Services		MC			1969	1979	Merged into Magnum Airlines. Operated BN-2 Islander
Exclusive Air					1986	1994	
Executive Aerospace			EAS	AEROSPACE	1984	2008	
Executive Turbine Air Charter			TEA		2001	2011	
Express Air Services			FLN		1996	2001	To BidAir Cargo
Eyethu Air Cargo					1997	1999	Acquired by Aero Air Charter. Operated Douglas DC-3, Douglas DC-4
F
Flitestar		GM	TKE		1991	1994	Operated Airbus A320, ATR 72
Fly Blue Crane		7B	FCO	BLUE CRANE	2015	2017	Entered business rescue on 3 February 2017
Fly Titan					2018	2019	Operated BAe Jetstream, Beech King Air, Beech 1900, Cessna Grand Caravan, Embraer Brasilia, Embraer Bandeirante, Pilatus PC-12
Forest Airlines			FOL	FORESTAIR	1993	1994	Operated Piper Seneca, Piper Chieftain, Cessna 401
Foster Webb Air Charter					1982	1998	Operated Piper Chieftain
G
Gauteng Air Cargo					1996	1998	Operated Boeing 707-320C
George Air					1965	1966	Founded by J. E. J. Coetzer & Pat McClure
Giyani Airways					1974	1994	Merged with Letaba Airways to form Phoenix Airways. Operated Fairchild Metro
Griekwalug					1960s	1960s	Charter operator based in Kimberley Airport
Grinair					1971	1976	Operated Douglas DC-3
H
Haller Aviation					1946	1947	Merged with Sharwoods Flying Services to form Southern Aviation. Operated Aeronca Sedan
Hawkair					1960s	1960s	Acquired by Interstate Air Services. Operated Beech Baron, Beech Bonanza, Beech Debonair, Auster Autocar
Hydro Air Cargo			HYC		2000	2003	Ceased operations after their only Boeing 747 was destroyed in a landing accident at Lagos
I
Impala Air Cargo		PH	IPL		1992	1995	
Imperial Air Cargo					2006	2014	Airline acquired by BidAir Cargo
Intensive Air		IM	XRA		1993	2002	Operated HS 748, Fokker F28
Inter Air Lines					1979	1994	Renamed to Interair South Africa
Interair South Africa		D6	ILN	INLINE	1993	2015	
Interlink Airlines		ID	ITK	INTERLINK	1997	2010	Went into liquidation on 2 March 2010
International Air					1960s	1960s	Operated Bristol Britannia
Interstate Air Services					1963	1979	Formed by the merger of Vaal Air Service and MS Air. Renamed to Interair. Operated Beech Bonanza, Cessna 402, de Havilland Dove
K
Kulula.com		MN	CAW	COMMERCIAL	2001	2022	Part of Comair. Operated 10 Boeing 737.
L
Ladysmith Air Charters					1960s	1960s	Renamed to Tugela Air Services
Letaba Airways		LK			1974	1979	Merged with Giyani Airways to form Phoenix Airways
Lima-Kilo (Edms)					1983	1985	Renamed to Metavia Airlines. Operated Aero Commander 690
Loex Air Cargo					1993	1995	Taken-over by Romoco Cargo. Operated Antonov An-12
Lowveld Aviation Services					1976	1980	Merged with Citi Air, Border Air, Magnum Airlines to form Link Airways (South Africa)
Luft Afrique					1997	2000	Established as Valitrade. Renamed to Luft Cargo
Luft Cargo			LUT	LUGO	2000	2002	Renamed from Luft Afrique. Operated Fokker F27
M
Madiba Air					1999	1999	Operated Grumman Gulfstream
Mafeking Aviation Services					1976	1978	Merged with Air Lowveld and Avna Airlines to form Magnum Airlines
Mafiking Air Services					1978	1979	Established by the government of Bophuthatswana. Renamed to Mmabatho Air Service. Operated Cessna aircraft
Magnum Airlines					1978	1979	Merged with Citi Air, Border Air, Lowveld Aviation Services to form Link Airways
Magnum Airlines					1978	1990	Formed by the merger of Air Lowveld, Avna Airlines, Mafeking Aviation Services. Operated Beech Baron, Beech Queen Air, BN-2 Islander, Trislander, Cessna 402, Piper Cherokee Six, Swearingen Metroliner
Magnum Airlines Helicopters					1979	1980	Established as Command Airways in 1977. Renamed to Command Airways
Majuba Aviation					2003	2012	Operated Pilatus PC-12
Malherbe and Kiesewetter					1940s	1940s	
Mallel Airline Services					1995	1995	Operated Lockheed L-188
Mango		JE	MNO	TULCA	2003	2021	Part of South African Airways. Operated 14 Boeing 737.
Margate Air Services		OJ			1978	1985	Renamed to Citi Air. Operated BN-2 Islander
Mercury Aviation Services					1946	1948	Operated Douglas DC-3
Metavia Airlines		OW	MNK	VIAMET	1985	1998	Established as Lima-Kilo (Edms). Acquired by SA Airlink. Operated Let Turbolet
Midlands Aviation		5T			1967	1995	Acquired by Airlink
Million Air Aviation					1986	1994	Renamed to Million Air Charter
Million Air Charter			ZSM		1994	2004	Rebranded as Egoli Air. Operated Antonov An-32, Boeing 727, Douglas DC-9, Learjet 23
Mmabatho Air Service					1979	1986	Established as Mafiking Air Services. Renamed to Bop Air
N
Namakwaland Lugdiens		NJ	NLD	NOVEMBER JULIETT	1961	1989	National Airlines merged in. Operated Beech Bonanza, Douglas DC-3, Piper Aztec
Natal (National Airlines)		NF			1946	1979	
Natal Aviation Company					1920	1924	
National Air Cargo					2005	2008	
National Air Charters					1946	1963	Renamed to National Airways Corporation
Nationwide Air Charter					1991	1995	Renamed to Nationwide Airlines
Nationwide Airlines		CE	NTW	NATIONWIDE	1991	2008	
Naturelink Aviation			NRK	NATURELINK	1997	2011	Merged into National Airways Corporation
Nelair Charters			NLC	NELAIR	1980	1986	Operated Douglas DC-3
NN Charters					1981	1998	Founded by J.A. Smith. Operated Piper Seneca, Piper Navajo
Noord Weste Lugdiens					1963	1965	Operated Cessna 172, Piper Super Cub
North Atlantic Airways			NAA		1998	1999	Operated Boeing 747-200
O
O.F.S. Air Services					1953	1969	Operated Tiger Moth, de Havilland Dragon Rapide
Oribi Air					1975	1975	To Avna Rennies Airlines
Oriole Express					1980	1996	Operated Douglas C-47
P
Pacair					1968	1970	To National. Operated Cessnas aircraft
Pan African Air Charter					1946	1953	Owned by the Keyser and Cowan families. Operated Douglas C-47
Pelican Air Services		7V	PDF		2002	2011	
Pesloed Flights					1989	1990	Operated Douglas C-47
Phalaborwa Air Services					1970s	1970s	To Comair (South Africa)
Phoenix Airlines					1950s	1950s	Operated Douglas DC-2
Phoenix Airways				PHOENIX	1994	1995	
Pretoria Air Services					1997	2000	Operated Douglas C-47, Pilatus PC-6
Progress Air Charter					2003	2009	Operated Swearingen Metroliner
Protea Airways					1961	1977	Established as Volkslugdiens. Operated Dornier Do 27, Dornier Do 28, Vickers VC.1 Viking
Q
Qwila Air			QWL		2002	2009	Operated Beech 1900
R
Rennies Air					1974	1975	Merged with Avna and Oribi Air to form Avna Rennies Airlines. Operated BN-2 Islander, Piper Navajo, Cessna 402
Romoco Cargo					1994	1997	Operated Ilyushin Il-76
Ross-Thompson Aircraft Company					1921	1924	Founded by C. G. Ross and C. R. Thompson. Operated Avro 504K
Rossair Executive Air Charter			RSS	ROSS CHARTER	1956	2005	
Rovos Air		6P	VOS	ROVOS	2001	2014	
Ryan Blake Air Charter					2000	2006	Operated Fairchild Metro III, Swearingen Metro II
S
SA Airlink		5T;4Z	LNK	Airlink AL	1994	1998	renamed/merged to South African Airlink
Skywise		C9	SWZ	SKYWISE	2013	2015	Operations halted November 10, 2015
South African Express		XZ	EXY	EXPRESSWAYS	1994	2020	
South African Historic Flight			SYY		1991	2007	Rebranded as Skyclass
Stars Away Aviation			STX		2005	2013	
Sun Air		BV	SNN	Southwestern Air Service	1994	1999	Absorbed by SAA and shut down
Sun Air		AQ	SJE		2001	2004	Rebranded as Millionair Aviation
T
Tramon Air			TMX	TRAMON	1995	2006	
Trek Airways		JW	TKE	TREKAIR	1953	1994	
U
Union Airways					1929	1934	
V
Valan International Cargo Charter			VLA		2002	2007	
Velvet Sky		VZ	VEL	VELVET	2010	2012	Went into liquidation May 7, 2012

== See also ==
- List of airlines of South Africa
- List of airports in South Africa
