= List of airlines of South Africa =

This is a list of airlines currently operating in South Africa.

== Commercial airlines ==
Airline	Image	IATA	ICAO	Callsign	Commenced operations
Airlink		4Z	LNK	LINK	1992
CemAir		5Z	KEM	CEMAIR	2002
FlySafair		FA	SFR	SAFAIR	2013
LIFT		GE	GBB	GLOBE	2020
South African Airways		SA	SAA	SPRINGBOK	1934

== Charter airlines ==
Airline	Image	IATA	ICAO	Callsign	Commenced operations
Aeronexus Corporation			ARN	AERONEX	2001
Africa Charter Airline			FSK	AFRICAN SKY	2007
Allegiance Air			ANJ	AIR ALLEGIANCE	2008
Angel Gabriel Aeronautics				ANGEL	
Avex Air Transport			AVE	AVEX AIR	1965
Civair		2I	CIW	CIVFLIGHT	1989
Cobra Aviation		0C	CBR	COBRA	2019
Comair Flight Services			GCM	GLOBECOM	2007
Federal Air		7V	FDR	FEDAIR	1989
Global Aviation		GE	GBB	GLOBE	2001
King Air Charter					1996
National Airways Corporation		NF	LFI	NATCHAIR	1946
Phoebus Apollo Aviation		PE	PHB	PHOEBUS	1979
Safair		FA	SFR	SAFAIR	1969
Solenta Aviation		SL	SET		2000

== Cargo airlines ==
Airline	Image	IATA	ICAO	Callsign	Commenced operations
Airlink Cargo		4Z	LNK	LINK	
BidAir Cargo			BRH	BRIGHTSTAR	2005
DHL Aviation			DHV	WORLDSTAR	1994
Star Air			BRH	BRIGHTSTAR	2007

== See also ==
- List of defunct airlines of South Africa
- List of airports in South Africa
