= Sun Air =

Sun Air may refer to:

- Sun Air (South Africa), a defunct South African airline
- Sun Air (Sudan), an airline based in Khartoum, Sudan
- Sun Air Express, an American commuter airline
- Sun-Air of Scandinavia, a British Airways franchisee
- Sunair, a New Zealand airline
- Sun Air, former name of Pacific Sun (airline), an airline based in Nadi, Fiji
