= Command Airways (South Africa) =

South African airline

IATA	ICAO	Call sign
CT	CAH	Command
- Founded: 1977
- Hubs: JNB-OR Tambo International Airport * HCS-Sandton City Heliport * HPR-Pretoria Central Heliport
- Focus cities: HBL-Babelegi Industrial Heliport * HIC-Iscor Heliport * HLA-Lanseria Airport
- Fleet size: 7
- Destinations: 6
- Parent company: Dynamic Technology
- Headquarters: Johannesburg, South Africa
- Key people: DL Van Dyke (founder & CEO), FG Baylis (founder)

Command Airways was an airline based in Johannesburg, South Africa, operating scheduled services from 6 September 1977 to 30 June 1980 and thereafter non-scheduled services only.

== History ==
Founded on 30 June 1977 and based at OR Tambo International Airport (then known as Jan Smuts Airport) (JNB), Johannesburg, Command Airways was the first scheduled helicopter airline in South Africa and on the African continent. Services between Pretoria Central Heliport (HPR) and Johannesburg began on 6 September 1977. Within a short period, the route system expanded to include Babelegi Industrial Park Heliport (HBL), Iscor Heliport (HIC) and Lanseria Airport (HLA).

Services linking Sandton City Heliport (HCS) and Johannesburg (JNB) were inaugurated on 19 February 1978. Passenger demand rose quickly and authority to increase flight frequency to Sandton City Heliport was given on 9 April 1979.

From 1 September 1979, the carrier allied with Magnum Airlines Ltd and rebranded as Magnum Airlines Helicopters. Sandton City Heliport became an active hub for the airline's scheduled services as well as for other charter and industrial aid operators. The noise of intensified operations was a major public concern and a high-profile media focus. Despite joint attempts by helicopter operators to mitigate their environmental impact, the city council ordered Sandton City Heliport closed effective from 30 June 1980.

The airline again operated as Command Airways, ceased scheduled operations and refocussed on developing its helicopter charter market. Although no longer part of the Magnum Airlines alliance, it maintained other cooperative agreements.

== Incidents and accidents ==
- 4 August 1978: Command Flight 9501, using a Bell 206B JetRanger II, experienced an engine failure en route to the filming site of the movie Zulu Dawn in Natal Province with the pilot, the Executive Producer, the Executive Producer's wife and son, and an assistant on board. A successful autorotation was performed to a dry riverbed. There were no injuries and damage was limited to the alighting gear. The flameout was later determined to have been caused by a sheared idler gear in the accessory gearbox.
- 20 May 1980: Command Flight 9611, using a Bell 206B-3 JetRanger III, crashed while performing a low-level filming sequence in a railway shunting yard near Germiston, Johannesburg. One passenger, a television producer, was killed and four persons were injured including the pilot, one actor and one cameraman aboard the helicopter and one actor on the ground.

== Fleet ==
Command Airways' Bell 222 ZS-HJK

The Command Airways fleet comprised the following aircraft:

- 1 Bell 206B JetRanger II (ZS-PAW)
- 2 Bell 206B JetRanger III (ZS-HHD, ZS-HHE)
- 1 Bell 206L LongRanger (ZS-HGG)
- 2 Bell 206L-1 LongRanger II (ZS-HJN, ZS-HJR)
- 1 Bell 222 (ZS-HJK)
