= Interair South Africa =

Airline based in Johannesburg, South Africa

| IATA | ICAO | Call sign |
|---|---|---|
| D6 | ILN | INLINE |
- Founded: 1993
- Commenced operations: 1994
- Ceased operations: August 2015
- Hubs: O. R. Tambo International Airport
- Headquarters: Johannesburg, South Africa
- Website: www.interair.co.za

Inter Aviation Services (Pty) Ltd, which traded as Interair South Africa, was a privately owned airline based in Johannesburg, South Africa. It operated scheduled passenger services from Johannesburg to regional destinations in Africa. Its main base was O. R. Tambo International Airport, Johannesburg.

== History ==
The airline was established, by Aeronautical Investments, as Inter Air Lines at Lanseria in 1979; it was renamed to Interair in 1993 and started operations in 1994. It initially operated domestic services, but these later ceased. Regional services were started in April 1995, and the airline ceased operations altogether in late August 2015, following the death of Executive Chairman David Tokoph on 18 August 2015.

Interair South Africa was a member of the International Air Transport Association (IATA/IOSA certified), and the African Airlines Association (AFRAA).

== Corporate affairs ==
=== Ownership ===
The airline was owned by the late David P. Tokoph (who was also Chairman & Chief Executive Officer consecutively), J Attala, M Attala, P Attala (Executive Director), and had 191 employees (as at March 2012).

=== Business trends ===
Because it was a private company, annual reports were not published. In the absence of these, little information on trends is available, as shown below:

| | 2009 | 2010 | 2011 | 2012 |
|---|---|---|---|---|
| Turnover (€m) | n/a | n/a | n/a | n/a |
| Profits (€m) | n/a | n/a | n/a | n/a |
| Number of employees | | | 240 | |
| Number of passengers (m) | n/a | n/a | n/a | n/a |
| Passenger load factor (%) | n/a | n/a | n/a | n/a |
| Number of aircraft (at year end) | 3 | 4 | 4 | 4 |
| Notes/sources | | | | |

== Destinations ==
Interair South Africa appeared to operate services to the following international scheduled destinations (according to the company website), as of August 2015:

| Hub |
| Terminated route |

| City | Country | IATA | ICAO | Airport | Refs |
|---|---|---|---|---|---|
| Brazzaville | Republic of the Congo | BZV | FCBB | Maya-Maya Airport | |
| Cotonou | Benin | COO | DBBB | Cadjehoun Airport | |
| Dar es Salaam | Tanzania | DAR | HTDA | Julius Nyerere International Airport | |
| Johannesburg | South Africa | JNB | FAOR | O. R. Tambo International Airport | |
| Ndola | Zambia | NLA | FLSK | Simon Mwansa Kapwepwe International Airport | |
| Pointe Noire | Republic of the Congo | PNR | FCPP | Pointe Noire Airport | |

=== Codeshare agreements ===
As of June 2014, the airline had codeshare agreements with the following airlines:

- Air Tanzania (Dar es Salaam–Johannesburg)

== Fleet ==
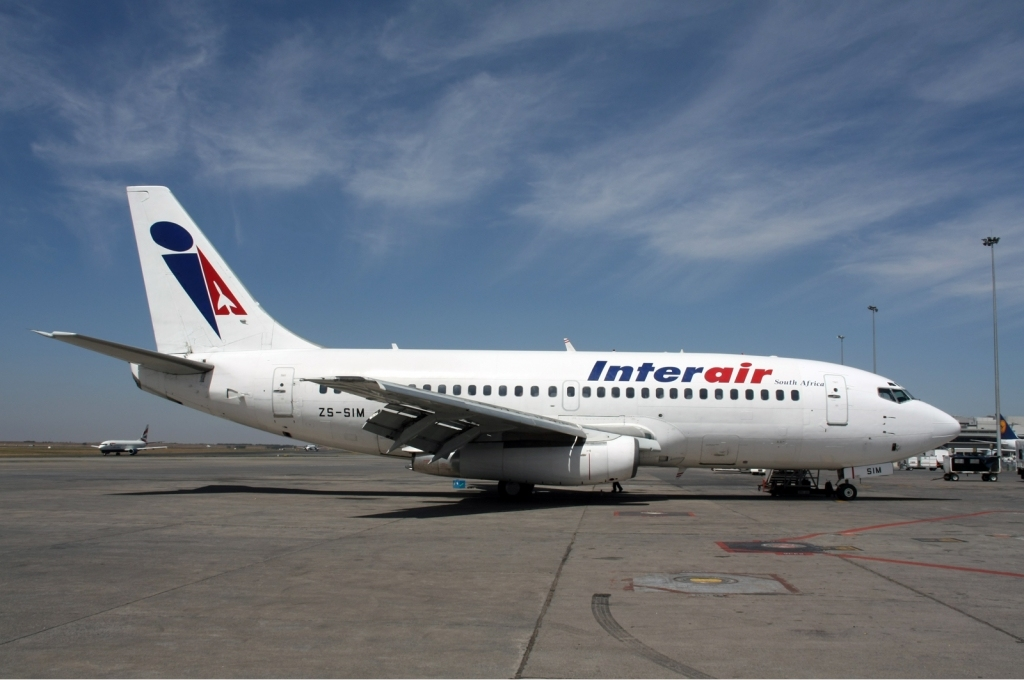
Interair Boeing 737-200 ZS-SIM at O. R. Tambo International Airport

The Interair South Africa fleet comprised the following aircraft (as of August 2017):

Interair South Africa fleet
| Aircraft | In fleet | Order | Passengers | | | Notes |
| Aircraft | In fleet | Order | C | Y | Total | Notes |
|---|---|---|---|---|---|---|
| Boeing 737-200 | 2 | 0 | 12 | 96 | 108 | |
| Boeing 737-200C | 1 | 0 | | | | |
| Boeing 767-200ER | 1 | 0 | | | 214 | |
| Total | 4 | 0 | | | | |
