= Egoli Air =

Airline based in Johannesburg, South Africa

IATA	ICAO	Call sign
-	-	-
- Founded: 1986 (as Million Air Aviation)
- Ceased operations: 2 November 2012
- Hubs: OR Tambo International Airport
- Fleet size: 4
- Headquarters: Johannesburg, South Africa
- Key people: G Clarke and C Talevi (Owners)

Egoli Air was an airline based in Johannesburg, South Africa. It operated charter flights both domestically and to destinations throughout Africa. Its main base was OR Tambo International Airport, Johannesburg.

== History ==
The airline was established in 1986 and started operations in June 1986 as Million Air Aviation; it was rebranded as Million Air Charter in 1994 and took the current name in 2004.

During the 2006 Financial Year, 1time Airlines purchased Egoli Air and got its McDonnell Douglas Fleet, then Egoli Air became a Charter Airline under the 1time name.

1time Airlines filed for Business rescue (The South African equivalent of Chapter 11 Bankruptcy) in August of 2012 and ceased operations on the 2nd of November on that year following financial difficulties. Coincidentally, a Zimbabwean Budget airline called Fresh Air was supposed to launch on that same day in a partnership with them.

== Fleet ==
The Egoli Air fleet consisted of the following aircraft (As of March 2007):

- 2 Antonov An-32
- 2 Antonov An-32B

Former Fleet (As of the 2006 Financial Year):

- 3 McDonnell Douglas DC-9-30
- 1 McDonnell Douglas DC-9-15
