= Skywise (airline) =

South African airline

IATA	ICAO	Call sign
C9	SWZ	SKYWISE
- Founded: 2013
- Commenced operations: 11 February 2015
- Ceased operations: 10 November 2015
- Hubs: OR Tambo International Airport
- Headquarters: Johannesburg, South Africa
- Key people: J. Malik, Chairman; Johan Borstlap, Co-CEO
- Website: http://skywise.co.za/

Skywise was a South African domestic low-cost airline headquartered in Johannesburg and based at OR Tambo International Airport. It solely operated flights between Johannesburg and Cape Town, but suspended operations in November 2015.

== History ==
Skywise was founded by Tabassum Qadir and J. Malik in March 2013. Skywise received its air service license in 2014, and the official launch flight took place on 11 February 2015. On 5 March 2015, the first daily scheduled flights commenced.

On 20 October 2015, Skywise announced the reduction of frequency between Johannesburg and Cape Town from eight to six return flights per day. The frequency was to be improved shortly as the plans to revitalise the airline were underway. An additional Boeing 737 was to be acquired to serve the increased number of flights. The airline was also eyeing regional routes into other countries in Africa.

Skywise was barred from taking off from Cape Town or Johannesburg for several hours on 11, 12 and 13 October 2015 because of debts owed to Airports Company South Africa (ACSA) and Air Traffic & Navigation Services (ATNS). From a total of 24 flights, only 6 flights were affected during the three days. By 15 October, all flights between Cape Town and Johannesburg – the route that the airline serviced four times a day – were taking off on time. Following the Skywise dispute with ACSA and ATNS, Skywise received much negative publicity. The media reported that Skywise was "grounded" whilst Skywise affirmed that only two of their eight flights were affected for the day; the 'grounding' formed the major part of media coverage as it was maintained that they were not flying.

However, the airline later confirmed it had received a notice from Acsa warning it would be shut down because of unpaid airport charges and by 10 November 2015 all of Skywise's aircraft had been withdrawn, effectively halting further operations. Flights never resumed, and the airline's official website was shut down.

== Corporate affairs ==
=== Ownership ===
80% of the airline was owned by South Africans, including the Mandela Family and the Co-CEO Irfan Pardesi, while 20% is owned by Pak Africa CEO Tabassum Qadir. The company was co-chaired by Faizel Motlekar and J. Malik. Johan Borstlap, was the other Co-CEO and Muhammed Saleem Kachi Kumhar, Deputy Chairperson. Some of the board members had interests in another failed low-cost airline, which liquidated in November 2012. Skywise operated in two cities; Johannesburg and Cape Town and the head office was in Sandton City, Johannesburg.

=== Partnerships ===
Skywise had partnerships with:

- BidAir Cargo, a wholly owned subsidiary of BidVest Group, an international investment company that is listed on four stock exchanges internationally – the JSE Securities in South Africa and its counterparts in Australia, London and Luxembourg.
- Menzies Aviation, a global provider of passenger, ramp and cargo handling services has grown rapidly since 1995. John Menzies PLC is a Scottish business established in 1833. It has two main divisions: Menzies Distribution and Menzies Aviation and is listed on the London Stock Exchange.
- Computicket, South Africa's leading ticketing company with offerings covering the whole spectrum of leisure activities, came to full fruition when acquired by the group.

=== Sponsorships ===
- In celebration of 25 years since the release from prison of Nelson Mandela on 11 February 2015, Skywise's maiden flight carried scores of children from Kgamane High School, Malapyane in Mpumalanga as well as youths from Thembekile Mandela Foundation.
- On 18 July 2015 Skywise supported the painting of 14 classrooms at Kgamane High School, Malapyane in Mpumalanga as part of the 67 Minutes of Mandela.
- On 22 July 2015 Skywise supported the Laudium Youth Summit with stationery (pens, rulers and bags) in an event organized by the Laudium Women's Network to celebrate youth from the Laudium community.

== Destinations ==
Skywise Airlines serviced South Africa's most popular domestic route between Johannesburg and Cape Town, flying six times daily.

South Africa

- Cape Town - Cape Town International Airport
- Johannesburg - O. R. Tambo International Airport

== Fleet ==
=== Fleet at closure ===
At closure, the Skywise fleet consisted of the following aircraft:

Skywise fleet
Aircraft	In service	Orders	Passengers	Notes/sources
Boeing 737-300	1	—	142	
Boeing 737-500	1	—	126	
Total	2	—		

== See also ==
- Kulula, a South African low-cost airline
- Mango, a South African low-cost airline
