= Bhisho Airport =

Minor South African airport

- IATA: BIY; ICAO: FABE

Summary
- Owner: Department of Transport, Eastern Cape
- Serves: Bhisho; Qonce (King William's Town)
- Elevation AMSL: 594 m / 1,950 ft
- Coordinates: 32°53′50″S 27°16′45″E

Maps
- Interactive Map
- Location in the Eastern Cape BIY (South Africa)

Runways
| Direction | Length | | Surface |
| Direction | m | ft | Surface |
|---|---|---|---|
| 08/26 | 2,502 | 8,209 | Asphalt |
- Source: CAA

Bhisho Airport (Afrikaans: Bhisho-lughawe; IATA: BIY, ICAO: FABE), also known as Bulembu Airport, is a airport in the Eastern Cape, South Africa. It serves the nearby towns of Bhisho and Qonce.

The airport lies of the west of the N2 national road towards Qonce. Historically, it was the hub of the short lived Ciskei International Airways from 1987 to 1989.

== 2023 visit by Mohammed bin Zayed Al Nahyan ==
In April 2023 the President of the United Arab Emirates (UAE), President Sheik Mohammed bin Zayed Al Nahyan, landed at the airport following a R20 million upgrade paid for by the UAE. The landing was controversial as it followed the announcement that the UAE had released the Gupta family from custody and so would not be extraditing them to face charges for state capture in South Africa.
