= Allegiance Air =

South African airline

IATA	ICAO	Call sign
-	ANJ	AIR ALLEGIANCE
- Founded: 2008
- Fleet size: 2
- Headquarters: Lanseria, South Africa

Allegiance Air is a charter airline based in Lanseria, South Africa.

== History ==
The company started as a charter broker and commenced its own aircraft operations in February 2008. It is privately owned.

== Fleet ==
The Allegiance Air fleet comprises the following aircraft (as of August 2017):

Allegiance Air fleet
Aircraft	In Service	Orders	Passengers	Notes
Embraer EMB 120ER Brasilia	2	—		
Total	2			

The airline fleet previously included the following aircraft (as of 4 November 2008):

- 5 British Aerospace 146-200 (3 stored and 2 to Air Congo in 2008)
