= Comair Flight Services =

South African charter airline

IATA	ICAO	Call sign
—	GCM	GLOBECOM
- Founded: 2007; 19 years ago
- Operating bases: Johannesburg–Lanseria; Johannesburg–O.R. Tambo
- Fleet size: 21
- Headquarters: Lanseria International Airport, Johannesburg, Gauteng, South Africa
- Website: www.flycfs.com

Comair Flight Services (commonly referred to as CFS) is a South African business aviation company established in 2007. It is based in Johannesburg, South Africa. Its head office is based at Lanseria International Airport.

== History ==
Originally established in 2007, the company was initially named Corporate Flight Services and in 2012 Comair General Aviation Holdings acquired a stake in the company, whereafter it was re-branded as Comair Flight Services, retaining the initials "CFS". CFS is a licensed non-scheduled air service (charter) operator and holds EASA TCO (Third Country Operators) Approval as well as a worldwide Air Operator Certificate from the South African Civil Aviation Authority as well as Domestic and International Air Service Licences.

== Fleet ==
As of May 2018 the CFS charter fleet included the following aircraft types:

Aircraft Type	Number of aircraft
Cessna 208 Caravan	2
Pilatus PC-12/45	5
Pilatus PC-12/47E (NG)	6
Beechcraft King Air C90GTx	1
Beechcraft King Air B200	1
Cessna Citation Mustang	1
Nextant 400XT	1
Bombardier Learjet 45	2
Bombardier Learjet 60	1
Hawker 4000	1
Total	21

The company provides executive and safari air charter services, outsourced flight department and aircraft management services as well as flight / trip support and aircraft sales services.
