= AirQuarius Aviation =

South African airline, 1997–2012

IATA	ICAO	Call sign
-	AQU	QUARIUS
- Founded: 1997
- Ceased operations: February 2012
- Hubs: Lanseria Airport
- Secondary hubs: Cape Town International Airport
- Fleet size: 1
- Headquarters: Johannesburg, South Africa
- Key people: Gavin Branson August 1967 – October 2014
- Website: https://www.airquarius.com/ defunct

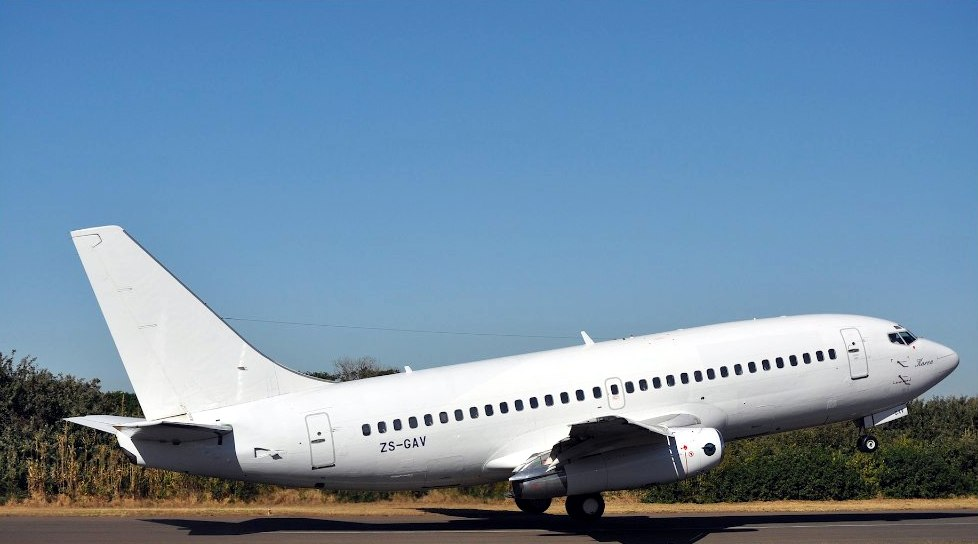
AirQuarius (ZS-GAV) "Karen" Boeing 737-200.

AirQuarius Aviation was an airline based in Johannesburg, South Africa, operating chartered flights and aircraft leasing contracted by companies throughout Africa and Asia. The airline's base was at Lanseria Airport, Johannesburg.

== History ==
AirQuarius Aviation (Pty) Ltd was established by Gavin Branson in 1997 and started operations in 2001, doing business as AirQuarius Air Charter. The name was changed to Branson Air (Pty) Ltd, doing business as AirQuarius in 2007. At one time, it had 120 employees. The airline specialized in operating flights to political crisis areas. As such, AirQuarius was the only operator into Baghdad or Basra during the Iraq War. Other missions included UN flights into Afghanistan and Sudan.

In 2011, it was alleged that an air operating certificate was awarded to an AirQuarius Charters aircraft on the basis of an inspection form which the inspector said was not written or signed by him.

AirQuarius stopped operating on 7 February 2012.

== Fleet ==
AirQuarius operated Fokker 28, Fokker 100, Hawker Siddeley HS 748 and Boeing 737-200 aircraft.

== Accidents and incidents ==
- June 1, 2002 - A HS 748 belonging to AirQuarius Aviation and carrying Hansie Cronje crashed into Cradock Peak, in the Outeniqua Mountains located in George. All three people, including Hansie were killed.
