= Phoenix Airways (South Africa) =

South African low-cost airline in the mid-1990s

IATA	ICAO	Call sign
—	PHO	SOUTHERN PHOENIX
- Founded: 1994
- Ceased operations: 1995
- Fleet size: 4

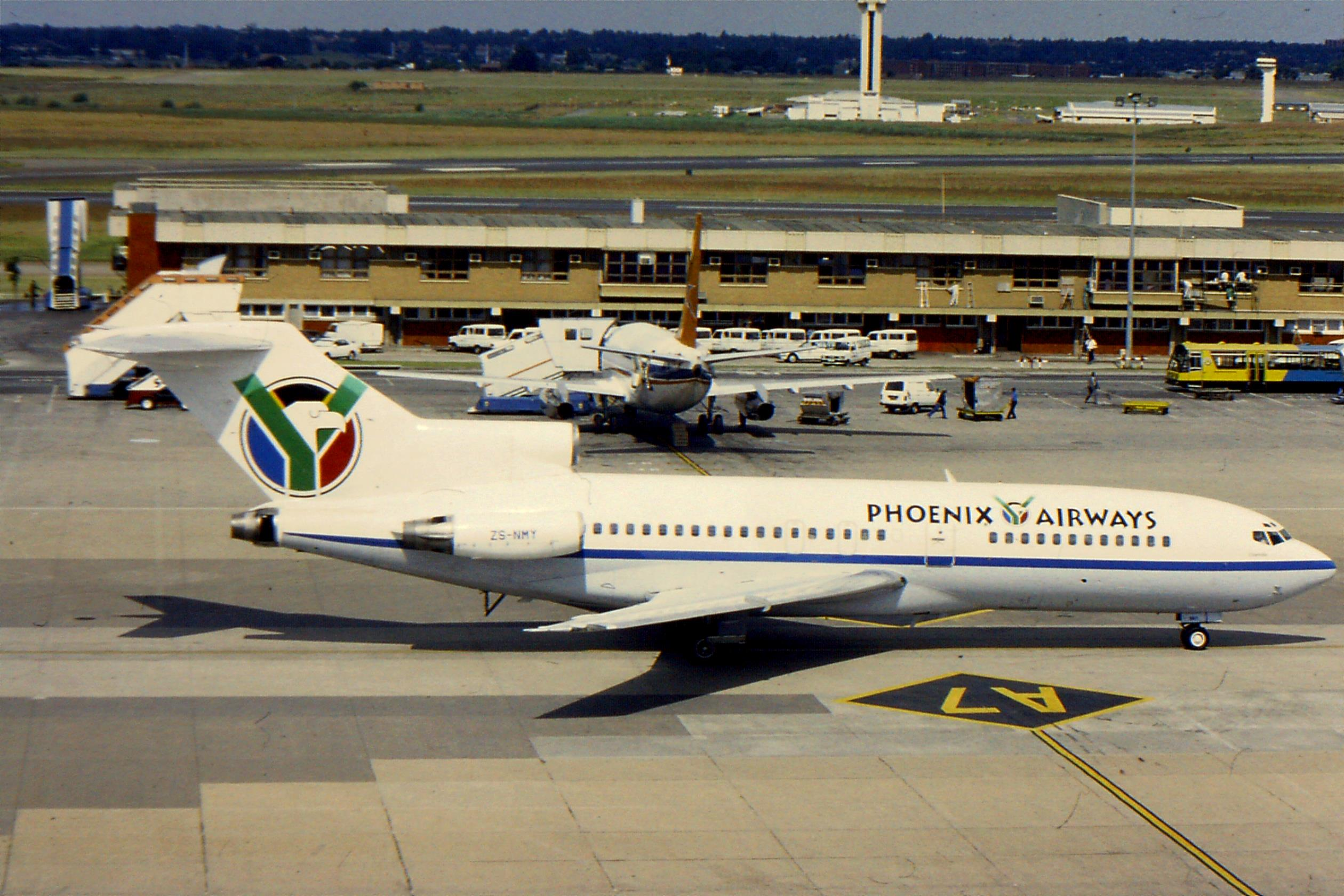
A former American Airlines plane, now painted with the Phoenix Airways name and logo. Photographed February 18th, 1995.

Phoenix Airways was a short-lived South African low cost airline in the mid-1990s.

== History ==
The airline was formed by the merger of Letaba Airways and Giyani Airways in 1995, the same year was acquired by Cape Town-based Atlantic Air after running into financial difficulties.

== Destinations ==
Phoenix Airways operated Johannesburg-Cape Town, Durban and Port Elizabeth-George routes

South Africa

- Cape Town
- Durban
- George
- Johannesburg
- Port Elizabeth

== Fleet ==
The airline operated a fleet of 4 Boeing 727s.
