= 1time =

South African low-cost airline

1time Airline
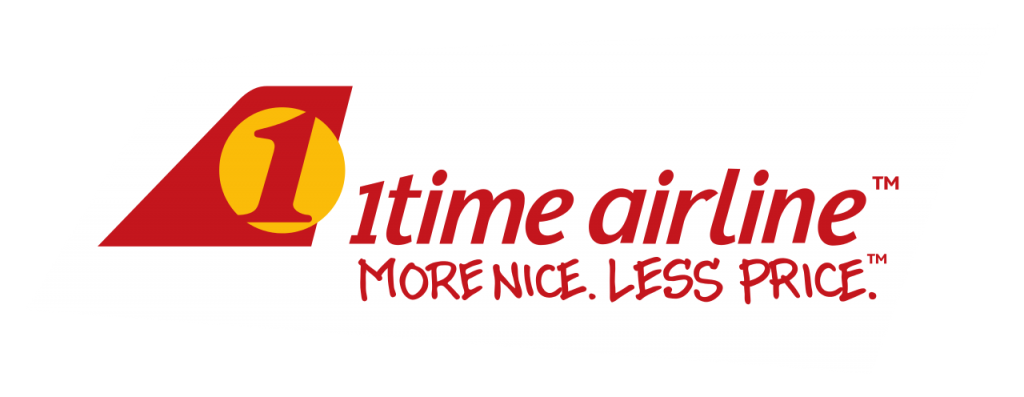
IATA	ICAO	Call sign
T6	RNX	NEXTIME
- Founded: 2003
- Commenced operations: 25 February 2004
- Ceased operations: 2 November 2012
- Hubs: OR Tambo International Airport
- Focus cities: Cape Town International Airport; King Shaka International Airport
- Fleet size: 11 (in 2012)
- Destinations: 9 (in 2012)
- Parent company: 1time Holdings
- Headquarters: Kempton Park, Ekurhuleni, Gauteng, South Africa
- Key people: CEO: Blacky Komani; Chairman: Sipo Twala; Operations Manager: James Budge
- Website: 1time.aero

1time Airline (Pty) Ltd commonly called 1time was a South African low-cost airline that operated between 2004 and 2012. Based in the Isando Industrial Park in Kempton Park, Ekurhuleni, Gauteng, 1time operated scheduled domestic and regional services. Its main base was OR Tambo International Airport, Johannesburg. The name of the company, "one time!", is a South African expression meaning "for real!".

In November 2012 the airline went into liquidation and ceased operations.

== History ==
=== Early history ===
The founders owned an aviation holding company, Afrisource Holdings, through which they owned Aeronexus, an aviation company that offered various aircraft services (and performed maintenance for 1time).

1time itself commenced ticket sales in January 2004, and started flying on 25 February 2004, with three daily return flights between OR Tambo International Airport and Cape Town International Airport.

The Avstar Group acquired a 15% shareholding in 1time Holdings, and under the deal the airline leased two additional 157-seat McDonnell Douglas MD-83 aircraft from the Group. In 2006 1time carried over a million passengers on services to eight destinations.

The airline was owned by Afrisource Holdings (50%), MKJH Trust (30%) and Mogwele Investments (20%) and had 420 employees (at March 2007).

1time Holdings made an IPO on the Johannesburg Securities Exchange (JSE) on 14 August 2007.

=== Provisional liquidation ===
On 22 August 2012, it was reported that 1time had filed for business rescue to give it protection from its creditors because it was "financially distressed".

1time ceased operations and filed for liquidation on 2 November 2012, cancelling all flights and stranding hundreds of passengers, after a final meeting with shareholders. The airline's final flight was at 15:00 on the day it was liquidated.

The airline later issued the following statement on its website:

1time Airline has applied for business liquidation and all of its operations have been grounded with immediate effect.

The business rescue practitioner has advised that there are no reasonable prospects of survival as a potential financier notified us this afternoon that they are no longer able to invest in our airline. It is therefore with the utmost regret, disappointment and heartfelt disbelief that we have to file for liquidation, which means the end of a dream and an era for all of us.

I sincerely thank our employees who worked so hard over the years to drive 1time's business, the travel trade who have been steadfast in their support, and our passengers who carried and maintained 1time during our most difficult and trying financial times, your loyalty is appreciated.

Although 1time ceases to exist, the airline that we've built up through blood, sweat, tears and undeniable passion, will live on in the hearts of our passengers and also our competitors, who know that they have lost a formidable and world-class player in the low cost market.

— Blackie Komani (1Time CEO)

On 6 November 2012, Dr Gerhard Holtzhauzen, 1time's business rescue practitioner, filed an application for the termination of the Business Rescue proceedings, and for the airline to be placed under provisional liquidation. The North Gauteng High Court issued a provisional liquidation order on 7 November 2012, and decreed that the return date for the order would be 11 December 2012, at which time the court will rule on the final closure of the business. On the same date, the Master of the High Court appointed Aviwe Ndyamara as the provisional liquidator.

On 19 December 2012 Fastjet announced that it had entered into an option agreement to buy the entire issued share capital of 1time Airline, and planned to take over up to three of the aircraft that were in the 1time fleet, and operate services on domestic South African routes. However, negotiations with the liquidator appear to have lapsed.

Low-cost carrier in South Africa was liquidated in November 2012

== Destinations ==
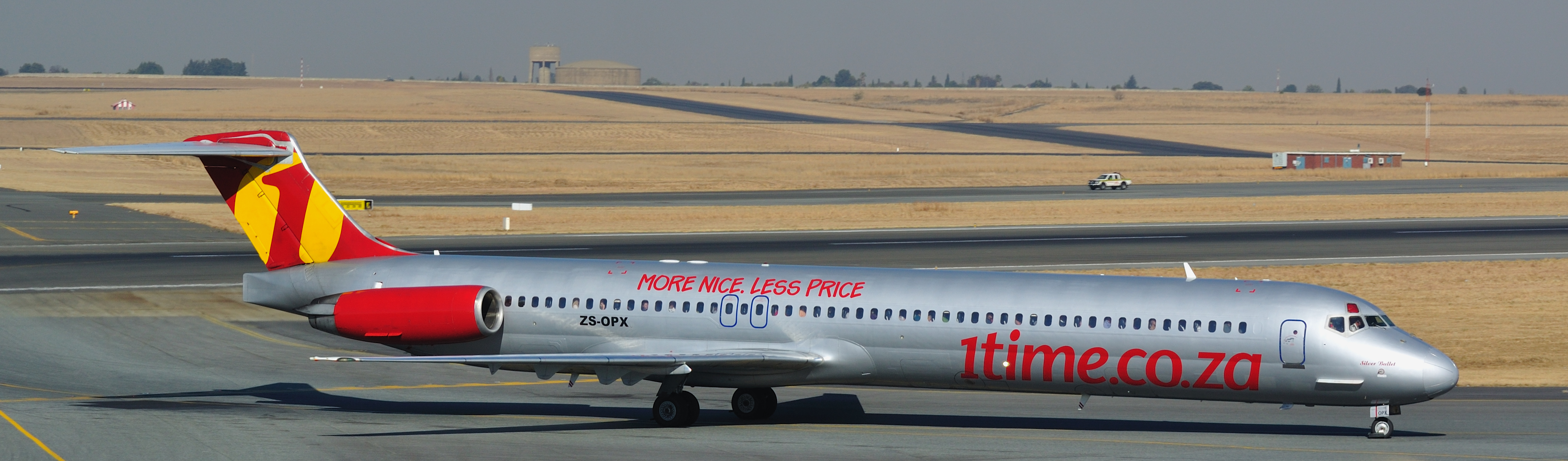
1time McDonnell Douglas MD-83 ZS-OPX at OR Tambo International Airport

At the time operations ceased, 1time flew to the following destinations:

South Africa

- Cape Town – Cape Town International Airport Focus City
- Durban – King Shaka International Airport Focus City
- East London – East London Airport
- George – George Airport
- Johannesburg – OR Tambo International Airport Hub
- Port Elizabeth – Port Elizabeth Airport

Tanzania

- Zanzibar – Zanzibar International Airport

Zambia

- Livingstone – Livingstone Airport

Zimbabwe

- Victoria Falls – Victoria Falls Airport

== Fleet ==
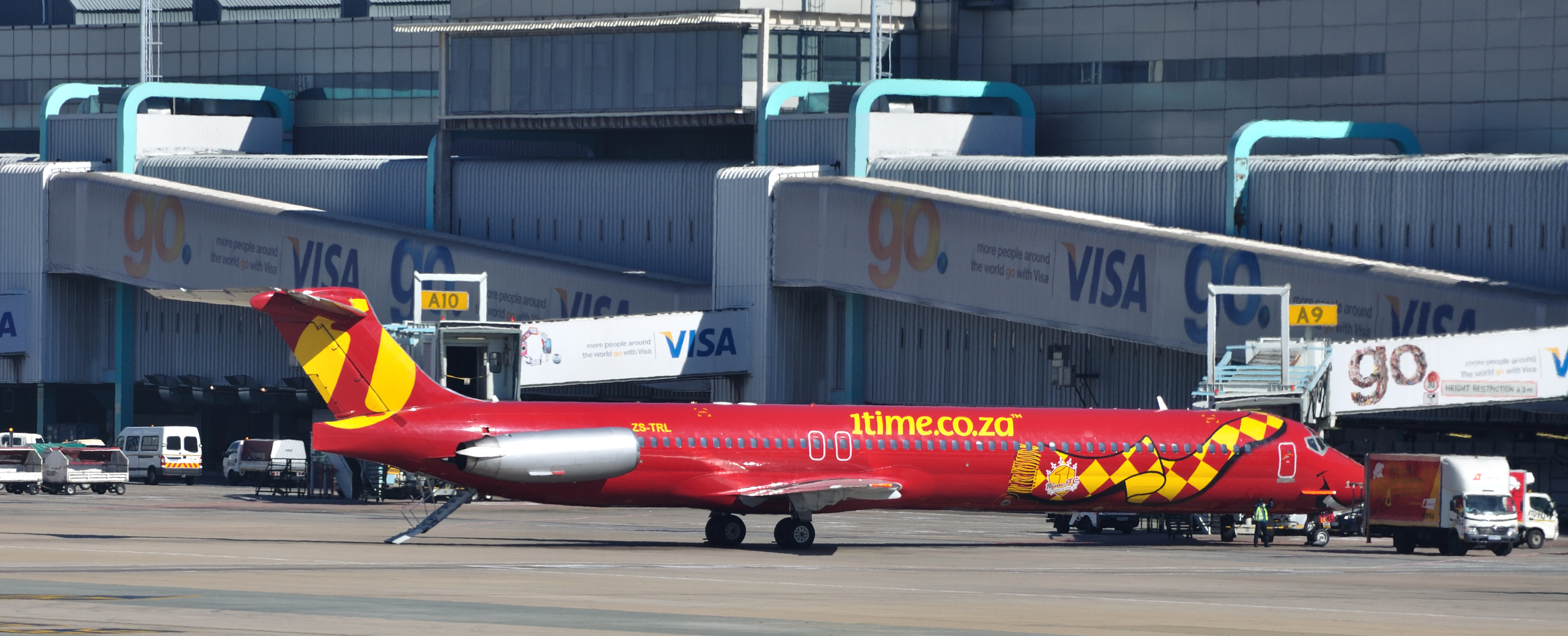
1time McDonnell Douglas MD-83 ZS-TRL at OR Tambo International Airport

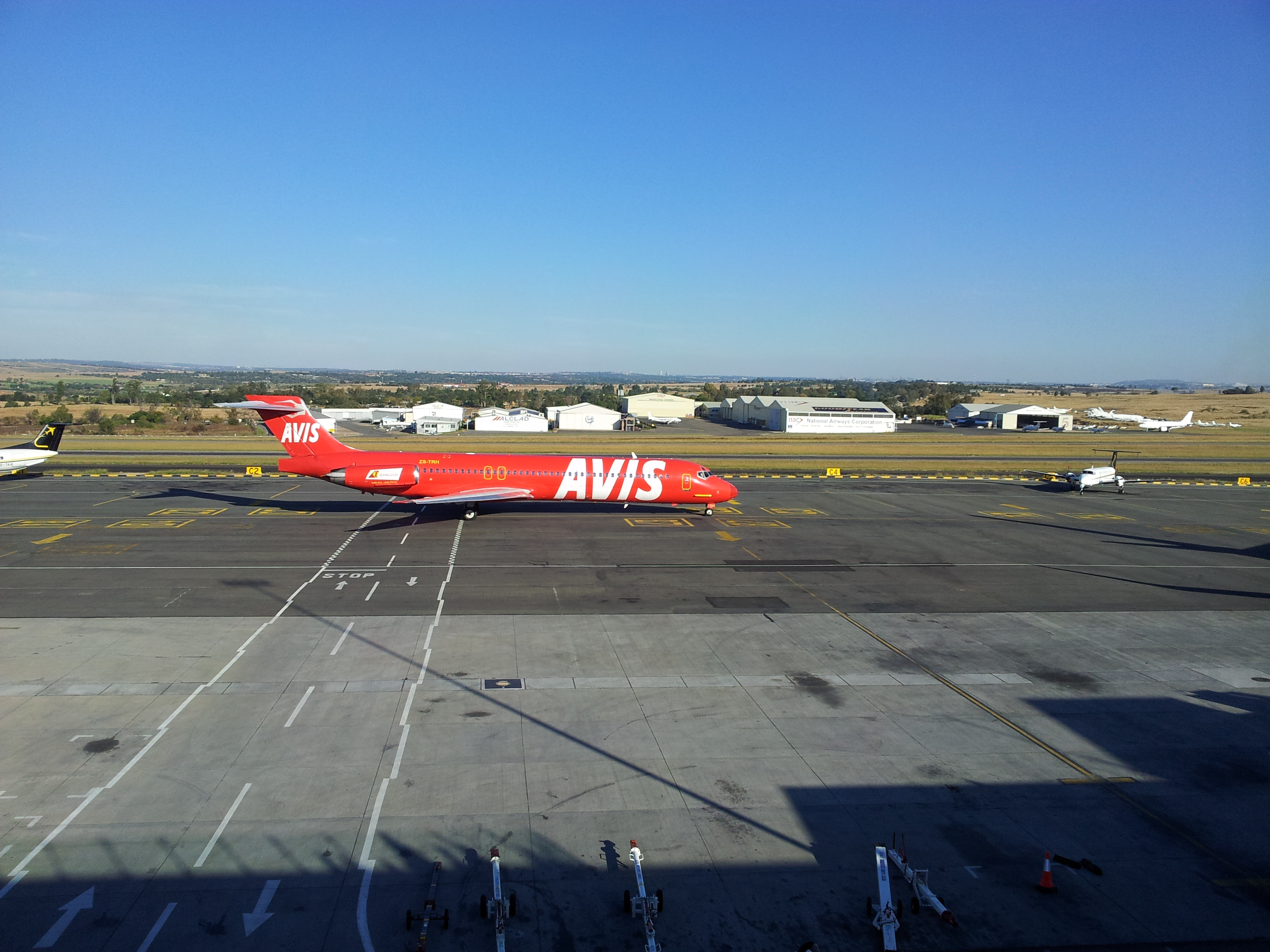
1time's McDonnell Douglas MD-87 ZS-TRH in AVIS livery at Lanseria International Airport

At the time operations were suspended, the 1time fleet consisted of the following aircraft:

1time fleet
Aircraft	In Service	Passengers	Notes
McDonnell Douglas MD-82	3	157	
McDonnell Douglas MD-83	5	157	
McDonnell Douglas MD-87	3	132	
Total	11		

Additionally, the airline previously operated at least x1 Boeing 737-200 and x5 Douglas DC-9s.

== See also ==
- Kulula.com, another South African low-cost airline
- Mango, another South African low-cost airline
