= Ciskei International Airways =

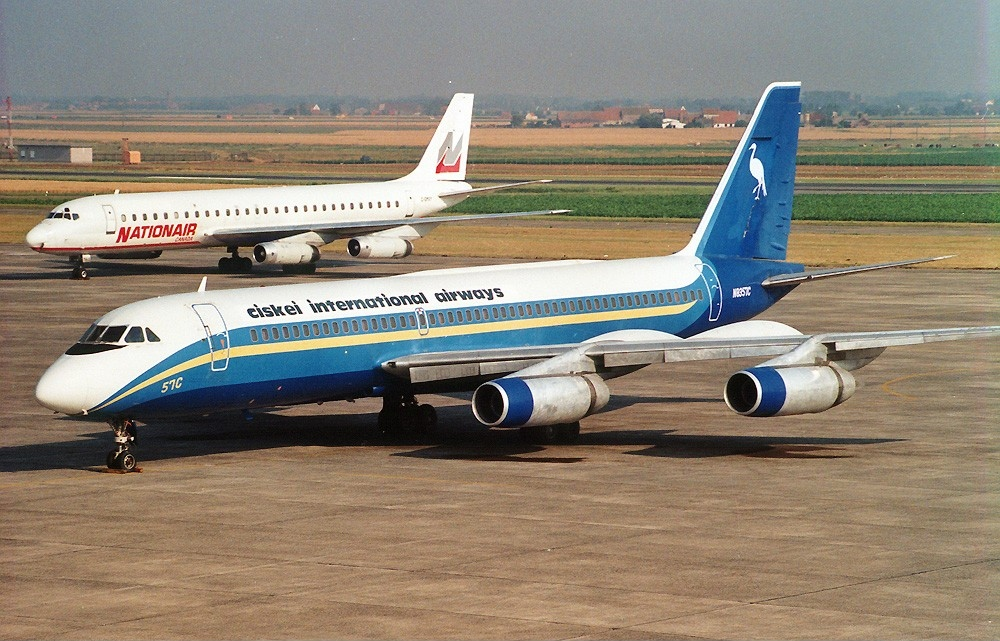
- Founded: 1987
- Commenced operations: June 1987
- Ceased operations: January 1989
- Hubs: Bhisho Airport

Ciskei International Airways was an airline run and owned by the Bantustan government of the Ciskei in South Africa. The airline ran from June 1987 to January 1989 operating out of Bhisho Airport as its hub. The airline, along with the construction of Bhisho Airport, was funded and run by the Government of South Africa. The airline flew one Convair 990 Coronado airplane and one Convair CV-880 airplane.
