= Imperial Air Cargo =

Airline in Johannesburg, South Africa

IATA	ICAO	Call sign
-	-	-
- Founded: 2006
- Ceased operations: 2014
- Hubs: O. R. Tambo International Airport
- Fleet size: 3
- Destinations: 6
- Parent company: Imperial Holdings (70%); Comair Limited (30%)
- Headquarters: Johannesburg, South Africa
- Key people: Muriel Sahd (Managing Director)
- Website: Imperial Air Cargo

Imperial Air Cargo was a cargo airline based in Johannesburg, South Africa that operated domestic overnight express cargo services.

== History ==
The airline started operations on 1 August 2006. It was owned by Imperial Holdings (70%) and Comair (30%). In November 2014 the airline was acquired by BidAir Cargo. The company ceased operations after the merger of both airlines.

== Destinations ==
Imperial Air Cargo operated domestic overnight express cargo services to the following domestic destinations as of 5 May 2011:

- Cape Town
- Bloemfontein
- Durban
- East London
- George
- Johannesburg
- Port Elizabeth

== Fleet ==
In May 2014 the Imperial Air Cargo fleet consisted of the following aircraft:

Imperial Air Cargo fleet
Aircraft	In fleet	Notes
Boeing 737-200F	3	
Total	3	
