= Sun Air (South Africa) =

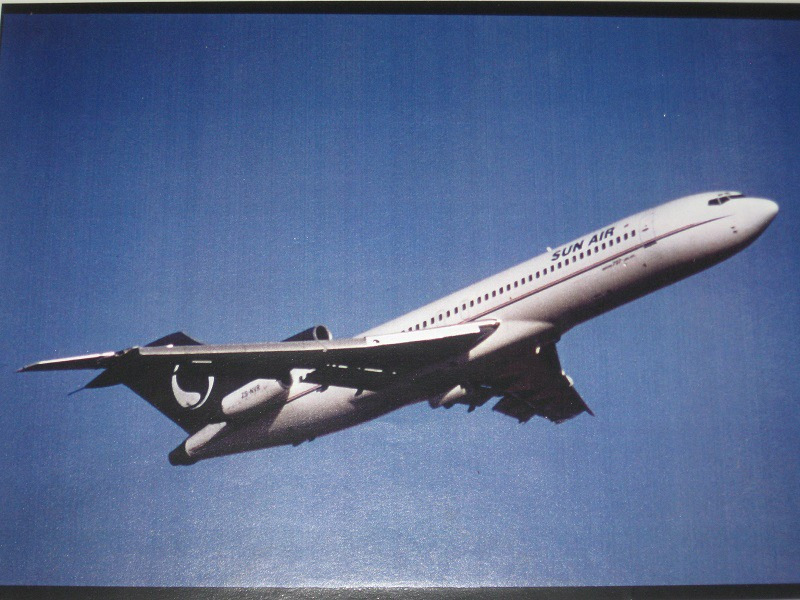
- Boeing 727-200 operated by Sun Air (South Africa)
- Founded: 1994
- Ceased operations: 1999
- Fleet size: 10

Sun Air was a South African airline, originally owned by the Bantustan of Bophuthatswana, and later privatised. It ceased operations in 1999.

The airline was revived in 2002 as a business-focused airline operating two aircraft between Lanseria Airport and Cape Town, before being liquidated in 2004.

== Company history ==
Originally called Bop Air, after Bophuthatswana, the airline rebranded as Sun Air following the end of apartheid in 1994 and the reincorporation of Bantustans into South Africa. Ownership of the airline transferred from the government of Bophuthatswana to the newly created North West Province which took over much of Bophuthatswana's former territory, prior to the airline's planned privatisation in 1997.

The airline was called Mafikeng Air Service between 1978 and 1979, and Mmabatho Air Service till 1986.

== Destinations ==
- Sun City
- Cape Town
- Durban
- Johannesburg
- Thaba 'Nchu
- Livingstone

== Fleet ==
The airline operated, at various times, a fleet of 5 McDonnell Douglas MD83's, 4 Douglas DC9s, a 727-200, 1 HS-748 2 EMB 120s, 3 EMB 110s, 2 Piper Chieftains, a Beechcraft King Air and a Gulfstream G3 an Cessna Citation 550 in VIP and charter roles.
