= Star Air (South Africa) =

South African airline

IATA	ICAO	Call sign
—	BRH	BRIGHTSTAR
- Founded: 1996
- Fleet size: 6
- Headquarters: South Africa
- Website: starair.co.za

Star Air Cargo Pty Ltd, usually known simply as Star Air, is a South African airline that leases out passenger and cargo aircraft.

== History ==
Star Air has been trading since 1996. It originally operated smaller aircraft, flying courier freight and small cargo for DHL Express (hence the Cargo name) and other companies contracted to fly for FedEx.

After starting to operate passenger flights, Star Air decided to move out of the smaller aircraft and to begin operating the Boeing 737, and started with their first 737-200 aircraft in 2007. Star Air has since negotiated leases with aircraft leasing companies for the newer generation 737-300 and 737-400 aircraft, to replace the 737-200s.

In June 2019, Star Air was acquired by Comair, who reportedly paid $5.14 million to acquire the airline and its repair division, Star Air Maintenance, and in December 2019 the acquisition was confirmed by the South African Competition Commission. However due to financial restraints imposed on Comair during CV19 flight groundings for 5 months in South Africa, in Oct 2020 the deal was cancelled.

== Corporate affairs ==
=== Ownership and structure ===
Star Air Cargo Pty Ltd is owned by Peter Annear provides Dry and Wet leasing to the Airline Industry. SAC operates B737-300/400 passenger and freight aircraft. SAC head office is in Rivonia. SAC Operation is located at the Denel Aviation Campus.

Star Air Maintenance Pty Ltd (SAM) is a subsidiary company of Star Air, and provides all the AOC’s maintenance requirements up to B checks. SAM also offers line maintenance to third parties, and is based and operates from a hangar in the Denel Aviation Campus facility, at O. R. Tambo International Airport in Johannesburg.

=== Business model ===
Star Air's main business is the leasing of aircraft on short and medium term wet and dry leases to scheduled airlines in the sub-Saharan African Region. According to their website, at various times they have had as customers Rwandair, Air Botswana, Air Malawi, Air Tanzania, LAM Mozambique Airlines, South African Express, Air Namibia and Mango Airlines (South Africa), amongst others.

== Fleet ==
=== Current fleet ===
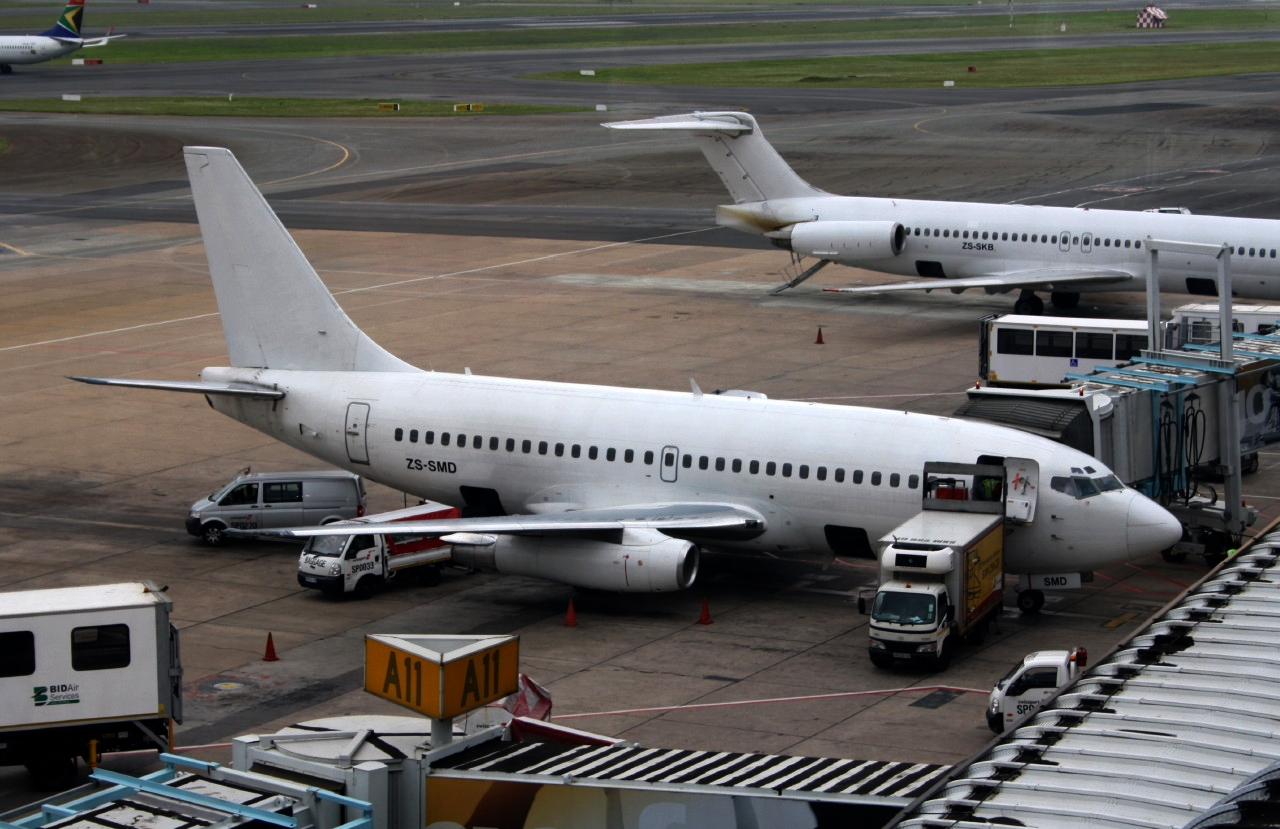
A former Star Air Boeing 737-200 at OR Tambo International Airport in 2009

As of August 2025, Star Air operates the following aircraft:

Star Air fleet
Aircraft	In service	Orders	Notes
Boeing 737-300	1	—	
Boeing 737-300BDSF	1	—	
Boeing 737-300SF	4	—	
Total	6	—	

=== Historical fleet ===
The airline fleet previously included the following aircraft (as of December 2011):

- 4 Boeing 737-200
- 1 Boeing 737-400
- 1 Boeing 737-500
