= BidAir Cargo =

South African cargo airline

BidAir Cargo Pty LTD
IATA	ICAO	Call sign
-	BRH	BRIGHTSTAR
- Founded: 2005
- Hubs: O. R. Tambo International Airport
- Fleet size: 3
- Destinations: 37
- Parent company: Bidvest Group
- Headquarters: OR Tambo International Airport
- Key people: Deen Gielink - Chief Executive Office Muriel Sahd - Chief Development and Operation Officer Roy Solomons - Chief Commercial Officer Charmaigne Haywood - Chief Financial Officer
- Employees: 552
- Website: bidaircargo.co.za

BidAir Cargo is a South African cargo airline that is wholly owned subsidiary of the Bidvest Group Limited, an international investment company. Was previously part of the BidAir Services group, a division of Bidvest that handles cargo in Africa. In 2014, BidAir bought and merged with Imperial Air Cargo.

BidAir Cargo operates in 8 branches in South Africa and Africa namely, Johannesburg, Bloemfontein, Cape Town, East London, Port Elizabeth, Durban, George and Cape Town. With an office in Entebbe, Uganda.

== Destinations ==
As of January 2021, BidAir Cargo serves 37 destinations in Southern and Eastern Africa as well as on Mauritius and the Comoros:

- Democratic Republic of Congo
  - Lubumbashi - Lubumbashi International Airport
  Kenya
  - Nairobi - Jomo Kenyatta International Airport
  - Mombasa - Moi International Airport
  Namibia
  - Windhoek - Hosea Kutako International Airport
  Mauritius
  - Mauritius - Sir Seewoosagur Ramgoolam International Airport
  Rwanda
  - Kigali - Kigali International Airport
  South Africa
  - Cape Town - Cape Town International Airport
  - Durban - King Shaka International Airport
  - East London - East London Airport
  - George - George Airport
  - Johannesburg:
    - OR Tambo International Airport Hub
    - Lanseria International Airport
  - Port Elizabeth - Port Elizabeth Airport
  South Sudan
  - Juba - Juba Airport
  Tanzania
  - Dar Es Salaam - Julius Nyerere International Airport
  - Zanzibar - Zanzibar International Airport
  - Mwanza - Mwanza Airport
  Uganda
  - Entebbe - Entebbe International Airport
  Zambia
  - Lusaka - Lusaka International Airport
  - Livingstone - Livingstone Airport
  - Ndola - Ndola Airport
  Zimbabwe
  - Harare - Harare International Airport
  - Victoria Falls - Victoria Falls Airport

== Fleet ==
As of January 2021, the BidAir Cargo fleet consists of the following aircraft:

Aircraft	In service	Orders	Notes
Boeing 737-300F	5	—	all operated by Star Air
Total	3	—	
