= Lanseria International Airport =

Secondary airport serving Johannesburg, South Africa

Lanseria International Airport Lanseria Internasionale Lughawe

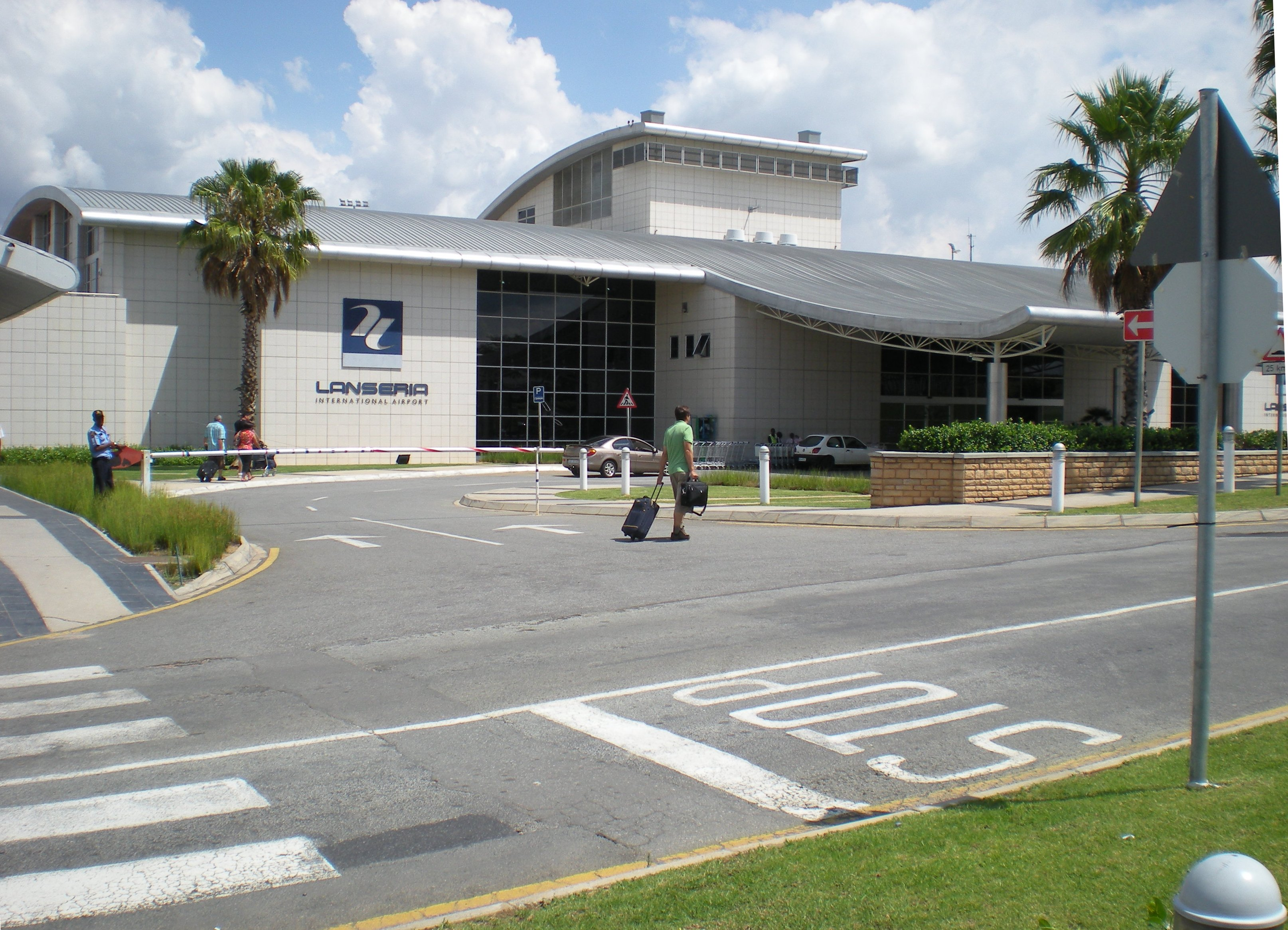
- IATA: HLA; ICAO: FALA

Summary
- Airport type: Private
- Owner: Consortium
- Serves: Johannesburg
- Location: City of Johannesburg Metropolitan Municipality, Gauteng
- Hub for: Solenta Aviation; FlySafair
- Elevation AMSL: 1,377 m (4,518 ft)
- Coordinates: 25°56′19″S 027°55′34″E
- Website: lanseria-airport.co.za

Map
- Location within the Johannesburg area

Runways
| Direction | Length | | Surface |
| Direction | m | ft | Surface |
|---|---|---|---|
| 07/25 | 3,047 | 9,996 | Asphalt |

Lanseria International Airport (IATA: HLA, ICAO: FALA) is a privately-owned international airport that is situated north of Randburg and Sandton to the northwest of Johannesburg, South Africa. The airport can handle aircraft up to the size of a Boeing 757-300, and was created to ease traffic congestion at OR Tambo International Airport.

== Location ==
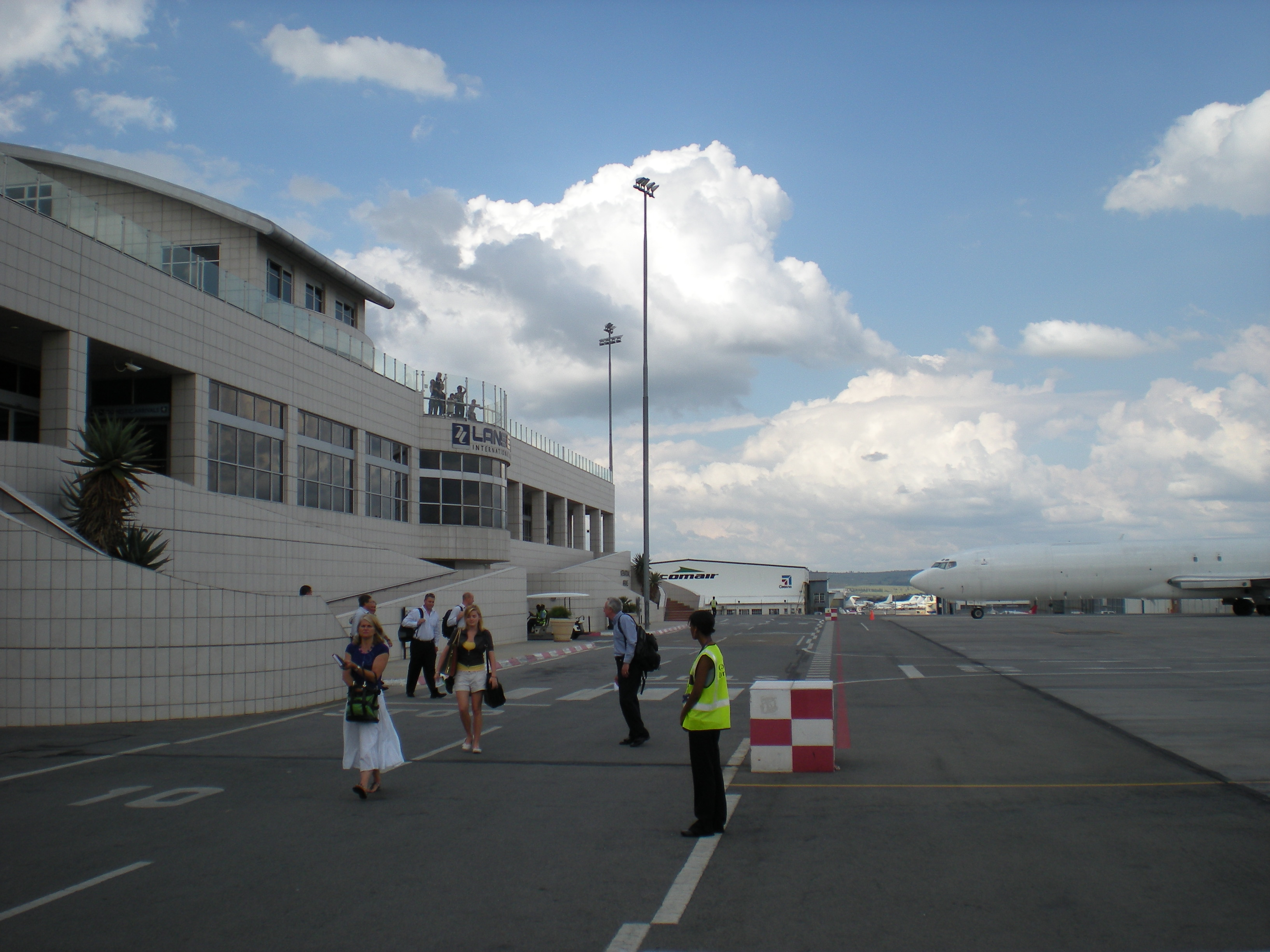
Airside exterior showing passengers exiting the terminal

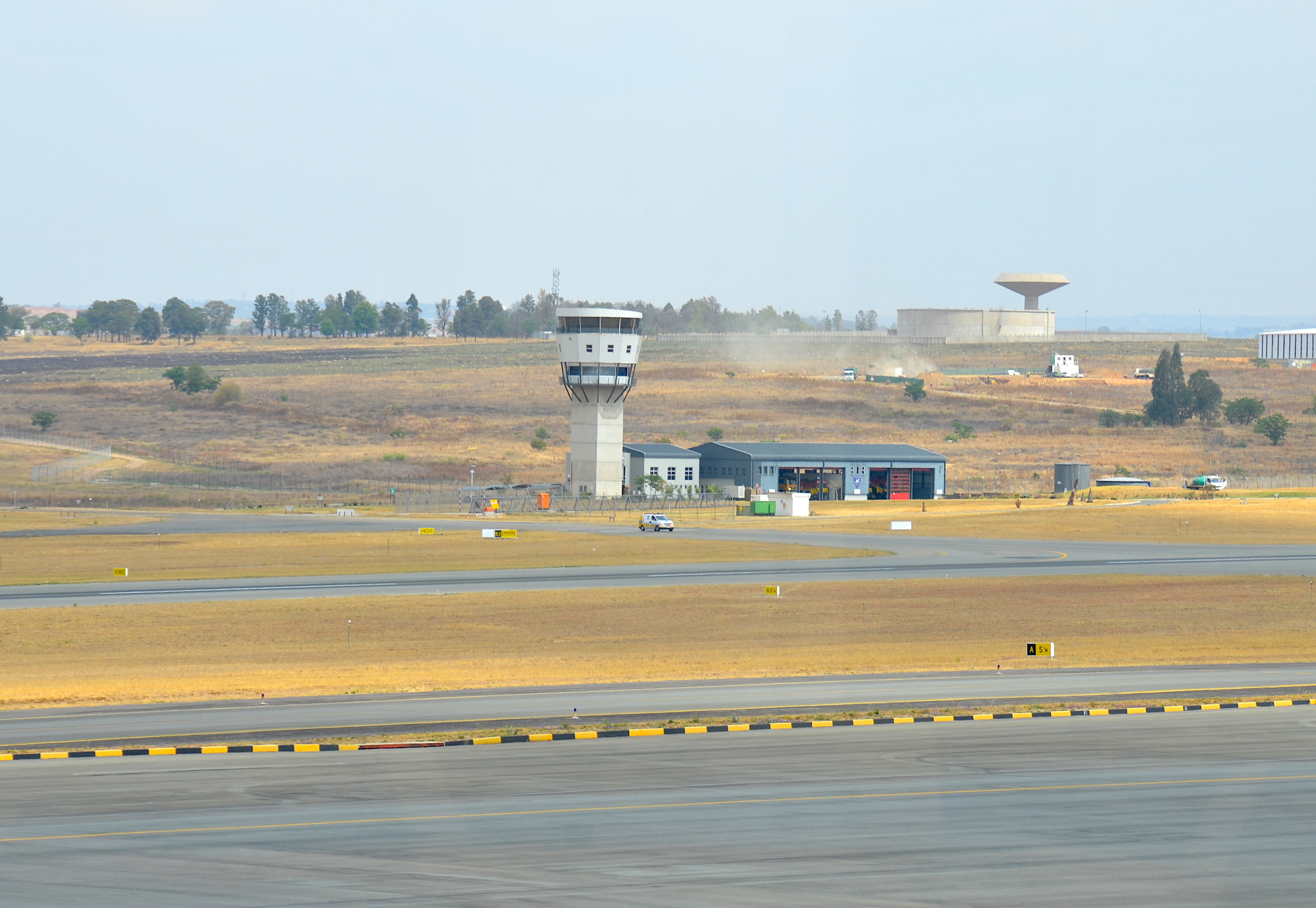
Air traffic control tower at Lanseria

It is located at the north-western edge of the City of Johannesburg Metropolitan Municipality (south-west of Centurion and Pretoria). Its entrance is on the R512 road (Pelindaba Road), which goes south to Randburg and north to the Hartbeespoort Dam.

== History ==
Lanseria Airport started out as a grass strip airfield in 1972, the brainchild of two Pretoria pilots: Fanie Haacke and Abe Sher. The land was originally bought by Krugersdorp and Roodepoort Municipality together with the Transvaal Peri-Urban Board and contracted to Lanseria Management Company on a 99-year lease since 1972.

The airport was officially opened by the Minister of Transport at the time, Hannes Rall, on 16 August 1974. Soon after its opening, Lanseria Airport hosted the Air Africa '75 (in 1975).

When Nelson Mandela was released from prison in 1990 he was flown to Johannesburg landing at Lanseria Airport.

On 15 November 2012, the airport was sold to a consortium consisting of Harith, an infrastructure development fund management company; the women's empowerment company Nozala; and the Government Employee Pension Fund, through the Public Investment Corporation.

On 11 November 2013, the airport opened its new 45-meter-wide 07/25 Runway and also closed the existing 30-meter-wide 06/24 runway. Kulula was the first airline to land on the new runway.

During the 2025 State of the City Address, the Mayor of Johannesburg, Dada Morero, announced plans to rename Lanseria, to reflect its identity and connection to Johannesburg better, fostering a sense of belonging while also strengthening the airport.

According to the Mayor, Lanseria's management is considering the name change as part of a broader effort to elevate its status and strengthen its brand. Coalition partners in the municipal government, including the UDM, opposed the renaming, saying that Johannesburg's financial issues should be focused on, and that renaming one of its airports was not of importance.

== Planned Airport Upgrade ==
Upgrade plans have been unveiled in July 2024. New facilities is to include Fixed Base Operator and Maintenance, Repair and Overhaul facilities. Taxiway Alpha is also to be upgraded and will enable the airport to accommodate larger aircraft such as the Boeing 777 and Airbus A330. Completion is expected by 2031, subject to approval.

== Aerodrome information ==
Runway 07 is equipped with ILS CAT I and is directed at 047° east of true north. The single runway has a 1.5% gradient, sloping up towards the southwest end of the runway; despite this gradient, the preferred landing direction is from the southwest, landing on Runway 07, because the winds are usually northerly, blowing south.

Communications
| Tower | 124.000 MHz |
| Ground | 121.650 MHz |
| Apron | 122.850 MHz |
| VOR/DME | 117.400 MHz |
| ATIS | 127.650 MHz |

== Airlines and destinations ==
=== Passenger ===
| Airlines | Destinations |
|---|---|
| Airlink | Harare (begins 15 November 2026) |
| FlySafair | Cape Town, Durban, East London, George, Gqeberha |

=== Cargo ===
| Airlines | Destinations |
|---|---|
| BidAir Cargo | Cape Town, Durban |

== Other facilities ==
National Airways has its head office building on the airport property.

Various maintenance and avionics companies are situated on the airport including Interjet Maintenance, MPT Maintenance, ExecuJet, Lanseria Jet centre and NAC, with various other smaller outfits. The maintenance facilities at Lanseria International Airport provide small to midsize aircraft maintenance mainly focused on corporate aircraft and small regional airliners, up to a Bombardier CRJ700 or similar.

== Accidents and incidents ==
- 8 October 1977 – During Airshow Africa '77 – a Britten-Norman Trislander performed a wing-over but had insufficient altitude to recover and the aircraft impacted the runway, bounced into the air and came to rest 500 m to the side of the runway. The flying controls were disabled and main gear detached. One wing engine detached. The crew were not injured but the aircraft was written off.
- On 2 October 1993, an Impala Mark I (no. 489) of the SAAF Silver Falcons aerobatic team crashed after suffering separation of the right wing during a performance at the Lanseria Airshow. The pilot ejected but was killed, as the ejection was initiated outside of the design envelope of the ejection seat.
