= List of airports in South Africa =

This is a list of airports in South Africa, grouped by type and sorted by location.

As of December 2024, the country has over 400 airports and airstrips, including international hubs, regional airstrips, and private aerodromes.

The country's nine principal airports are owned and operated by the state-owned Airports Company of South Africa these include all of South Africa's international airports, except for Lanseria International Airport and the under-construction Cape Winelands Airport, which are privately-owned.

South Africa's three primary international aviation gateways, and busiest airports by passenger volumes, are Cape Town International, situated in Cape Town, O.R. Tambo International, located in Johannesburg, and King Shaka International, located north of Durban. O.R. Tambo is among the busiest airports in the Middle East and Africa region.

Most other public airports are owned by local municipalities, although there are also a significant number of privately-owned airports. Some South African Air Force bases share the airfields of public airports. In the case of Air Force Base Hoedspruit, part of the base has been leased to a private company to be operated as a public airport.

The country also has a number of small aerodromes, used for general aviation. An approved list of aerodromes is maintained by the South African Civil Aviation Authority (SACAA).

Location of Airports in South Africa

== Airports ==
Airport names shown in bold indicate the airport has scheduled passenger service on commercial airlines. ICAO codes link to a page of aeronautical charts at the South African Civil Aviation Authority website.

City served	Province	ICAO	IATA	Airport name	Coordinates	Elev. (ft)
**Civil airports**
Aggeneys	Northern Cape	FAAG	AGZ	Aggeneys Airport	29°16′54″S 018°48′50″E	2,648
Alexander Bay	Northern Cape	FAAB	ALJ	Alexander Bay Airport (Kortdoorn Airport)	28°34′24″S 016°32′06″E	
Aliwal North	Eastern Cape	FAAN		Aliwal North Airport	30°41′00″S 026°44′00″E	4,410
Alkantpan	Northern Cape	FACO		Alkantpan Airport	29°54′23″S 022°19′00″E	3,591
Alldays	Limpopo	FAAL	ADY	Alldays Airport	22°40′44″S 029°03′19″E	2,600
Barberton	Mpumalanga	FABR		Barberton Airport	25°43′03″S 030°58′30″E	2,250
Beaufort West	Western Cape	FABW		Karoo Gateway Airport	32°18′00″S 22°40′00″E	2,929
Beeshoek mine	Northern Cape	FATF		Tommy's Field	28°15′36″S 022°59′35″E	4,360
Bethlehem	Free State	FABM		Bethlehem Airport	28°15′00″S 028°20′00″E	5,561
Bhisho	Eastern Cape	FABE	BIY	Bhisho Airport	32°53′42″S 027°17′06″E	1,950
Bloemfontein	Free State	FABL	BFN	**Bram Fischer International Airport**	29°05′38″S 026°18′14″E	4,457
Bothaville	Free State	FABO		Bothaville Airport	27°22′00″S 026°38′00″E	4,236
Brakpan	Gauteng	FABB		Brakpan Airport	26°14′17″S 028°18′21″E	5,300
Brits	North West	FABS		Brits Airfield	25°31′56″S 027°46′29″E	3,740
Bultfontein	Free State	FABU	UTE	Bultfontein Airport	28°16′21″S 026°08′08″E	
Calvinia	Northern Cape	FACV		Calvinia Airport	31°30′01″S 019°43′33″E	3,250
Cape Town	Western Cape	FAAA		Atlantic Aerodrome	33°35′17.5″S 18°37′05.4″E	239
Cape Town	Western Cape	FACT	CPT	**Cape Town International Airport**	33°58′05″S 018°36′17″E	151
Cape Town	Western Cape		ident ZA-0107	Robben Island Airstrip	33°48′01″S 018°21′49″E	0
Carnarvon	Northern Cape	FACN		Carnarvon Airport	30°59′15″S 022°07′50″E	4,150
Ceres	Western Cape			Ceres Airfield	33°19′00″S 019°25′35″E	1,900
Cradock	Eastern Cape	FACD	CDO	Cradock Airport	32°09′20″S 025°38′45″E	3,111
Clanwilliam	Western Cape	FACW		Clanwilliam Airfield	32°10′36″S 018°52′55″E	425
Durban	KwaZulu-Natal	~~FADN~~	~~DUR~~	~~Durban International Airport~~ (Note: Durban International Airport ceased all commercial operations on 30 April 2010. From 1 May 2010, all flights operate from the new King Shaka International Airport.)	29°57′56″S 030°56′57″E	33
Durban	KwaZulu-Natal	FALE	DUR	**King Shaka International Airport**	29°36′52″S 031°06′59″E	295
East London	Eastern Cape	FAEL	ELS	**King Phalo Airport**	33°02′06″S 027°49′18″E	435
Ekland Ranch	Limpopo	FAER	ELL	Ellisras Airport (Mitimba Airport)	23°43′36″S 027°41′18″E	2,793
Empangeni	KwaZulu-Natal	FAEM	EMG	Empangeni Airport	28°43′07″S 031°53′34″E	238
Ermelo	Mpumalanga	FAEO		Ermelo Airport	26°30′00″S 029°59′00″E	5,700
Ficksburg	Free State	FAFB	FCB	Ficksburg Airport	28°49′30″S 027°54′30″E	5,315
Fisantekraal / Durbanville	Western Cape	FAWN		Cape Winelands Airport	33°46′10″S 018°44′00″E	400
Gariep Dam	Free State	FAHV		Gariep Dam Airport	30°33′44″S 025°31′48″E	4,176
George	Western Cape	FAGG	GRJ	**George Airport**	34°00′24″S 022°22′30″E	648
Giyani	Limpopo	FAGI	GIY	Giyani Airport	23°17′00″S 030°39′00″E	1,575
Graaff Reinet	Eastern Cape	FAGR		Graaff Reinet Airport	32°11′41″S 024°32′28″E	2,588
Grahamstown	Eastern Cape	FAGT		Grahamstown Airport	33°17′00″S 026°30′00″E	2,135
Greytown	KwaZulu-Natal	FAGY		Greytown Airport	29°07′25″S 030°34′56″E	3,531
Harmony, Virginia	Free State	FAHA		Harmony Airport	28°04′43″S 026°51′40″E	4,399
Harrismith	Free State	FAHR	HRS	Harrismith Airport	28°14′00″S 029°06′00″E	5,585
Hazyview	Mpumalanga	FAHW	HZV	Hazyview Airport	25°03′00″S 031°07′55″E	
Heidelberg	Gauteng	FAHG		Heidelberg Airport	26°30′30″S 028°23′30″E	
Hluhluwe	KwaZulu-Natal	FAHL	HLW	Hluhluwe Airport	28°00′30″S 032°16′30″E	249
Hoedspruit	Limpopo	FAHS	HDS	**Hoedspruit Airport** (Eastgate Airport)	24°21′17″S 031°03′01″E	1,738
Johannesburg / Midrand	Gauteng	FAGC	GCJ	Grand Central Airport	25°59′13″S 028°08′26″E	5,325
Johannesburg / Randburg	Gauteng	FALA	HLA	**Lanseria International Airport**	25°56′23″S 027°55′29″E	4,517
Johannesburg	Gauteng	FAOR	JNB	**O.R. Tambo International Airport**	26°08′01″S 028°14′32″E	5,558
Germiston	Gauteng	FAGM	QRA	Rand Airport	26°14′31″S 028°09′05″E	5,483
Kimberley	Northern Cape	FAKM	KIM	**Kimberley Airport**	28°48′06″S 024°45′49″E	3,950
Kleinzee	Northern Cape	FAKZ	KLZ	Kleinzee Airport	29°40′59″S 017°05′35″E	270
Klerksdorp	North West	FAKD	KXE	P.C Pelser Airport	26°52′00″S 026°43′00″E	4,444
Koeberg/Melkbosstrand	Western Cape	FADX		Delta 200 Airstrip	33°38′58″S 018°28′18″E	220
Koiingnaas (Koingnaas)	Northern Cape		KIG	Koiingnaas Airport (Koingnaas Airport)	30°11′16″S 017°16′45″E	
Komatipoort	Mpumalanga	FAKP	KOF	Komatipoort Airport	25°26′26″S 031°55′49″E	
Kroonstad	Free State	FAKS		Kroonstad Airport	27°39′44″S 027°18′46″E	4,700
Krugersdorp	Gauteng	FAKR		Krugersdorp Airport	26°04′54″S 027°43′32″E	5,499
Kuruman	Northern Cape	FAKU	KMH	Johan Pienaar Airport	27°27′35″S 023°24′45″E	4,370
Ladysmith	KwaZulu-Natal	FALY		Ladysmith Airport	28°34′48″S 029°45′10″E	3,548
Lenasia	Gauteng	FASY		Baragwanath Aerodrome (Sylerfontein Airport)	26°34′00″S 27°57′01″E	5,420
Lichtenburg	North West	FALI		Lichtenburg Airport	26°10′00″S 026°11′00″E	4,875
Lime Acres / Finsch Mine	Northern Cape	FALC	LMR	Finsch Mine Airport	28°21′30″S 023°26′30″E	4,900
Louis Trichardt (was Makhado)	Limpopo	FALO	LCD	Louis Trichardt Airport	23°03′42″S 029°51′53″E	3,025
Lusikisiki	Eastern Cape	FALK	LUJ	Lusikisiki Airport	31°17′00″S 029°31′00″E	
Mahikeng / Mmabatho	North West	FAMM	MBD	Mahikeng Airport (Mmabatho Airport)	25°48′27″S 025°32′40″E	4,181
Majuba Power Station	Mpumalanga	FAMJ		Majuba Power Station Airport	27°04′45″S 029°46′42″E	5,600
Mala Mala	Mpumalanga	FAMD	AAM	**Mala Mala Airport**	24°49′03″S 031°32′41″E	1,100
Malelane	Mpumalanga	FAMN	LLE	Malelane Airport	25°28′24″S 031°33′56″E	1,153
Marble Hall	Limpopo	FAMI		Marble Hall Airport	24°59′30″S 029°17′00″E	2,980
Margate	KwaZulu-Natal	FAMG	MGH	**Margate Airport**	30°51′00″S 030°21′00″E	495
Middelburg	Mpumalanga	FAMB		Middelburg Airport	25°41′08″S 029°26′26″E	4,886
Mkuze (Mkuzi)	KwaZulu-Natal	FAMU	MZQ	Mkuze Airport (Mkuzi Airport)	27°37′33″S 032°02′39″E	400
Modimolle (was Nylstroom)	Limpopo	FANY		Modimolle Airport (Nylstroom Airport)	24°41′08″S 028°25′59″E	
Cape Farms (Morningstar township)	Western Cape			Morningstar Airfield	33°45′44″S 018°32′55″E	220
Mossel Bay	Western Cape	FAMO	MZY	Mossel Bay Airport	34°09′26″S 022°03′41″E	526
Mthatha (was Umtata)	Eastern Cape	FAUT	UTT	**Mthatha Airport** (was K.D. Matanzima Airport)	31°32′52″S 028°40′27″E	2,425
Mtubatuba / Dukuduku	KwaZulu-Natal	FADK	DUK	Mtubatuba Airport	28°22′06″S 032°14′53″E	210
Musina	Limpopo	FAMS	MEZ	Musina Airport (Morningside Farm Airport)	22°21′20″S 029°59′00″E	1,881
Mzamba / Wild Coast	Eastern Cape	FAMW	MZF	Wild Coast Sun Airport (Mzamba Airport)		
Nelspruit (Kruger National Park)	Mpumalanga	FAKN	MQP	**Kruger Mpumalanga International Airport**	25°23′30″S 031°05′57″E	2,829
Nelspruit	Mpumalanga	FANS	NLP	Nelspruit Airport	25°30′08″S 030°54′43″E	2,901
Newcastle	KwaZulu-Natal	FANC	NCS	Newcastle Airport	27°46′22″S 029°58′35″E	4,074
Ngala	Mpumalanga	FANG	NGL	Ngala Airfield		
Oudtshoorn	Western Cape	FAOH	OUH	Oudtshoorn Airport	33°36′00″S 022°11′00″E	1063
Parys	Free State	FAPY		Parys Airport	26°53′14″S 027°30′19″E	4,740
Phalaborwa	Limpopo	FAPH	PHW	Hendrik Van Eck Airport (Phalaborwa Airport)	23°56′10″S 031°09′18″E	1,432
Phinda	KwaZulu-Natal	FADQ	PZL	Zulu Inyala Airport	27°50′58″S 032°18′35″E	
Piet Retief	Mpumalanga	FAPF		Piet Retief Airport	27°00′00″S 030°50′36″E	4,420
Pietermaritzburg	KwaZulu-Natal	FAPM	PZB	**Pietermaritzburg Airport**	29°38′48″S 030°23′52″E	2,423
Pilanesberg / Sun City	North West	FAPN	NTY	Pilanesberg International Airport	25°20′08″S 027°10′18″E	3,412
Plettenberg Bay	Western Cape	FAPG	PBZ	**Plettenberg Bay Airport**	34°05′17″S 023°19′43″E	465
Polokwane (was Pietersburg)	Limpopo	FAPP	PTG	**Polokwane International Airport** (Pietersburg Int'l)	23°50′43″S 029°27′31″E	4,076
Polokwane (was Pietersburg)	Limpopo	FAPI		Pietersburg Civil Aerodrome	23°55′33″S 029°29′03″E	4,354
Pongola	KwaZulu-Natal	FAPL		Pongola Airport	27°21′42″S 031°36′20″E	942
Port Alfred	Eastern Cape	FAPA	AFD	Port Alfred Airport	33°35′00″S 026°53′00″E	275
Port Elizabeth	Eastern Cape	FAPE	PLZ	**Chief Dawid Stuurman International Airport**	33°59′24″S 025°36′37″E	226
Port St. Johns	Eastern Cape	FAPJ	JOH	Port St. Johns Airport	31°37′00″S 029°31′00″E	1,227
Potchefstroom	North West	FAPO		Potchefstroom Airport	26°40′05″S 027°05′05″E	4,520
Pretoria	Gauteng	FAWB	PRY	Wonderboom Airport	25°39′13″S 028°13′27″E	4,095
Prieska	Northern Cape	FAPK	PRK	Prieska Airport	29°41′01″S 022°46′14″E	3104
Queenstown	Eastern Cape	FAQT	UTW	Queenstown Airport	31°55′00″S 026°53′00″E	3,637
Reivilo	North West	FARI	RVO	Reivilo Airport	27°32′50″S 024°10′23″E	4,691
Richards Bay	KwaZulu-Natal	FARB	RCB	**Richards Bay Airport**	28°44′25″S 032°05′36″E	109
Robertson	Western Cape	FARS	ROD	Robertson Airfield	33°49′00″S 019°54′00″E	640
Rustenburg	North West	FARG		Rustenburg Airfield	25°39′00″S 027°17′00″E	3,700
Secunda	Mpumalanga	FASC	ZEC	Secunda Airport	26°31′14″S 029°10′20″E	5,250
Sishen	Northern Cape	FASS	SIS	Sishen Airport	27°39′00″S 023°00′00″E	3,848
Skukuza	Mpumalanga	FASZ	SZK	**Skukuza Airport**	24°58′00″S 031°36′00″E	1,020
Springbok	Northern Cape	FASB	SBU	Springbok Airport	29°41′22″S 017°56′20″E	2,690
Springs	Gauteng	FASI		Springs Airport	26°14′54″S 028°23′51″E	5,340
Stellenbosch	Western Cape	FASH		Stellenbosch Airport	33°58′47″S 18°49′11″E	295
Struisbaai	Western Cape	FAAF		Andrew's Field Airport	34°45′48″S 20°02′11″E	30
St. Francis Bay	Eastern Cape	FACF		St Francis Field	34°11′16″S 24°49′55″E	134
Swellendam	Western Cape	FASX		Hendrik Swellengrebel Airport	34°03′00″S 020°29′00″E	407
Tempe, Bloemfontein	Free State	FATP		New Tempe Airport	29°01′58″S 026°09′29″E	4,526
Thaba Nchu	Free State	FATN	TCU	Thaba Nchu Airport	29°19′03″S 026°49′20″E	4,938
Thohoyandou	Limpopo	FATH	THY	P.R. Mphephu Airport	23°04′37″S 030°23′00″E	2,018
Tutuka Power Station	Mpumalanga	FATT		Tutuka Power Station Airport	26°46′29″S 029°20′16″E	5,313
Tzaneen	Limpopo	FATZ	LTA	Tzaneen Airport	23°49′48″S 030°19′00″E	1,914
Ulundi	KwaZulu-Natal	FAUL	ULD	**Ulundi Airport** (Prince Mangosuthu Buthelezi Airport)	28°19′10″S 031°25′01″E	1,720
Upington	Northern Cape	FAUP	UTN	**Upington Airport**	28°24′04″S 021°15′36″E	2,791
Venetia Mine	Limpopo	FAVM		Venetia Mine Airport	22°26′53″S 029°20′15″E	2,333
Vereeniging	Gauteng	FAVV		Vereeniging Airport	26°34′12″S 027°57′36″E	4,846
Victoria West	Northern Cape	FAVW		Victoria West Airport	31°24′00″S 023°09′00″E	4,120
Virginia, Durban	KwaZulu-Natal	FAVG	VIR	Virginia Airport	29°46′14″S 031°03′30″E	20
Vredenburg / Saldanha Bay	Western Cape	FASD		Saldanha Airport	32°57′48″S 017°58′12″E	50
Vredendal	Western Cape	FAVR	VRE	Vredendal Airport	31°38′35″S 018°32′22″E	330
Vryburg	North West	FAVB	VRU	Vryburg Airport	26°58′00″S 024°44′00″E	3,920
Vryheid	KwaZulu-Natal	FAVY	VYD	Vryheid Airport	27°47′00″S 030°48′00″E	3,800
Welkom	Free State	FAWM	WEL	Welkom Airport	27°59′52″S 026°40′10″E	4,399
Kalbaskraal	Western Cape	none	none	Wintervogel Airfield	33°37′47″S 018°40′46″E	406
Witbank	Mpumalanga	FAWI		Witbank Airport	25°49′56″S 029°11′31″E	5,078
Zeerust	North West	FAZR		Zeerust Airport	25°35′56″S 026°02′32″E	4,258
**Military airports**
Bloemfontein	Free State	FABL	BFN	AFB Bloemspruit / Bloemfontein Airport	29°05′38″S 026°18′14″E	4,457
Cape Town	Western Cape	FAYP		AFB Ysterplaat	33°54′04″S 018°29′00″E	49
Durban	KwaZulu-Natal	FADN		AFB Durban	29°57′56″S 030°56′57″E	33
Hoedspruit	Limpopo	FAHS	HDS	AFB Hoedspruit / Eastgate Airport	24°21′17″S 031°03′01″E	1,738
Langebaanweg / Saldanha Bay	Western Cape	FALW	SDB	AFB Langebaanweg	32°58′08″S 018°09′55″E	108
Louis Trichardt (was Makhado)	Limpopo	FALM		AFB Makhado (was AFB Louis Trichardt)	23°09′35″S 029°41′47″E	3,069
Overberg	Western Cape	FAOB		AFB Overberg	34°33′17″S 020°15′02″E	52
Polokwane (was Pietersburg)	Limpopo	~~FAPB~~		AFB Pietersburg (disbanded)	23°50′43″S 029°27′31″E	4,076
Port Elizabeth	Eastern Cape	FAPE	PLZ	AFS Port Elizabeth / Port Elizabeth Airport	33°59′24″S 025°36′37″E	226
Pretoria	Gauteng	FAWK		AFB Waterkloof	25°49′40″S 028°13′15″E	4,940
Pretoria	Gauteng	FASK		AFB Swartkop (Zwartkop)	25°48′35″S 028°09′53″E	4,780

== See also ==
- List of airports by ICAO code: F#FA – South Africa
- List of bases of the South African Air Force
- List of busiest airports in South Africa
- List of South African airports by passenger movements
- Transport in South Africa
- Wikipedia:WikiProject Aviation/Airline destination lists: Africa#South Africa
