= List of South African Airways destinations =

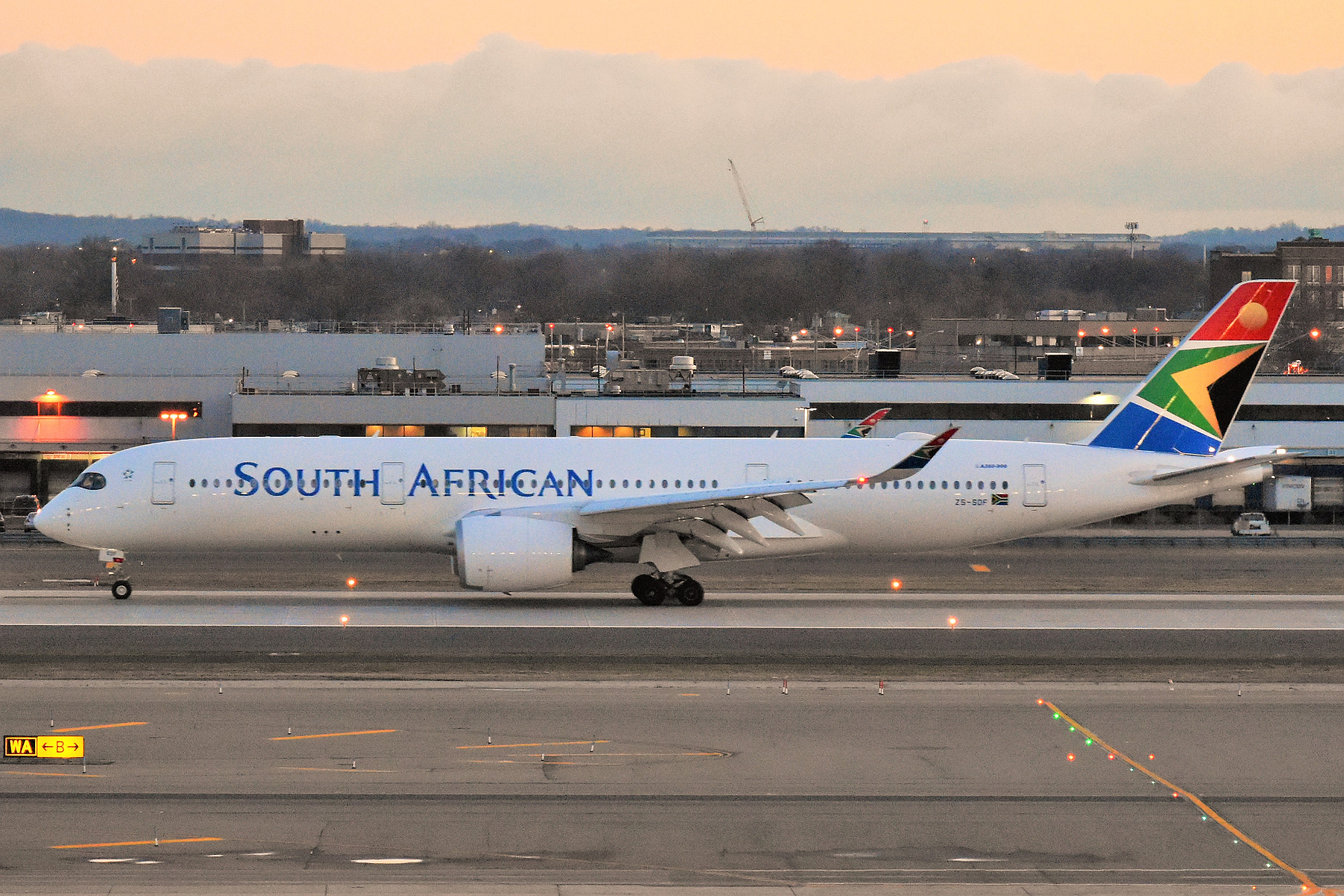
South African Airways' first Airbus A350-900 arriving at John F. Kennedy International Airport in New York. As of May 2026, this destination has been terminated.

This is a list of South African Airways destinations, as of July 2024. South African Airways served ten destinations outside Africa.

At June 2016, South African Airways served eight destinations outside Africa. By that time, the top five international routes led from Johannesburg to New York–JFK, London–Heathrow, Hong Kong, Frankfurt and Perth.

== List ==
Country	City	Airport	Notes	Refs
Angola	Luanda	Quatro de Fevereiro Airport	Terminated	
Argentina	Buenos Aires	Ministro Pistarini International Airport	Terminated	
Australia	Melbourne	Melbourne Airport	Terminated	
Australia	Perth	Perth Airport		
Australia	Sydney	Sydney Airport	Terminated	
Austria	Vienna	Vienna International Airport	Terminated	
Belgium	Brussels	Brussels Airport	Terminated	
Benin	Cotonou	Cadjehoun Airport	Terminated	
Botswana	Francistown	Francistown Airport	Terminated	
Botswana	Gaborone	Sir Seretse Khama International Airport	Seasonal	
Botswana	Selebi-Phikwe	Selebi-Phikwe Airport	Terminated	
Brazil	Rio de Janeiro	Rio de Janeiro/Galeão International Airport	Terminated	
Brazil	São Paulo	São Paulo/Guarulhos International Airport		
Burundi	Bujumbura	Bujumbura International Airport	Terminated	
Cameroon	Douala	Douala International Airport	Terminated	
Cape Verde	Sal	Amílcar Cabral International Airport	Terminated	
China	Beijing	Beijing Capital International Airport	Terminated	
Democratic Republic of the Congo	Kinshasa	N'djili Airport		
Democratic Republic of the Congo	Lubumbashi	Lubumbashi International Airport		
Denmark	Copenhagen	Copenhagen Airport	Terminated	
Eswatini	Manzini	Matsapha Airport	Terminated	
France	Paris	Charles de Gaulle Airport	Terminated	
Gabon	Libreville	Libreville International Airport	Terminated	
Germany	Frankfurt	Frankfurt Airport	Terminated	
Germany	Munich	Munich Airport	Terminated	
Ghana	Accra	Accra International Airport		
Greece	Athens	Ellinikon International Airport	Airport closed	
Hong Kong	Hong Kong	Hong Kong International Airport	Terminated	
India	Mumbai	Chhatrapati Shivaji Maharaj International Airport	Terminated	
Israel	Tel Aviv	Ben Gurion Airport	Terminated	
Italy	Milan	Milan Malpensa Airport	Terminated	
Italy	Rome	Rome Fiumicino Airport	Terminated	
Ivory Coast	Abidjan	Félix-Houphouët-Boigny International Airport		
Japan	Osaka	Kansai International Airport	Terminated	
Kenya	Nairobi	Jomo Kenyatta International Airport	Terminated	
Lesotho	Maseru	Moshoeshoe I International Airport	Terminated	
Luxembourg	Luxembourg City	Luxembourg Airport	Terminated	
Malawi	Blantyre	Chileka International Airport	Terminated	
Malawi	Lilongwe	Lilongwe International Airport	Terminated	
Mauritius	Port Louis	Sir Seewoosagur Ramgoolam International Airport		
Mozambique	Maputo	Maputo International Airport	Terminated	
Namibia	Keetmanshoop	Keetmanshoop Airport	Terminated	
Namibia	Windhoek	Hosea Kutako International Airport		
Netherlands	Amsterdam	Amsterdam Airport Schiphol	Terminated	
Nigeria	Abuja	Nnamdi Azikiwe International Airport	Terminated	
Nigeria	Lagos	Murtala Muhammed International Airport		
Portugal	Lisbon	Lisbon Airport	Terminated	
Republic of the Congo	Brazzaville	Maya-Maya Airport	Terminated	
Republic of the Congo	Pointe-Noire	Pointe-Noire Airport	Terminated	
Rwanda	Kigali	Kigali International Airport	Terminated	
Réunion	Saint-Denis	Roland Garros Airport	Terminated	
Senegal	Dakar	Blaise Diagne International Airport	Terminated	
Senegal	Dakar	Léopold Sédar Senghor International Airport	Terminated	
Seychelles	Mahé	Seychelles International Airport	Terminated	
South Africa	Alexander Bay	Alexander Bay Airport	Terminated	
South Africa	Bloemfontein	Bram Fischer International Airport	Terminated	
South Africa	Cape Town	Cape Town International Airport		
South Africa	Durban	King Shaka International Airport		
South Africa	East London	King Phalo Airport	Terminated	
South Africa	George	George Airport	Terminated	
South Africa	Gqeberha (Port Elizabeth)	Chief Dawid Stuurman International Airport		
South Africa	Hoedspruit	Hoedspruit Airport	Terminated	
South Africa	Johannesburg	O. R. Tambo International Airport	Hub	
South Africa	Kimberley	Kimberley Airport	Terminated	
South Africa	Margate	Margate Airport	Terminated	
South Africa	Mmabatho	Mahikeng Airport	Terminated	
South Africa	Nelspruit	Nelspruit Airport	Terminated	
South Africa	Phalaborwa	Hendrik Van Eck Airport	Terminated	
South Africa	Pietermaritzburg	Pietermaritzburg Airport	Terminated	
South Africa	Pietersburg	AFB Pietersburg	Terminated	
South Africa	Plettenberg Bay	Plettenberg Bay Airport	Terminated	
South Africa	Richards Bay	Richards Bay Airport	Terminated	
South Africa	Skukuza	Skukuza Airport	Terminated	
South Africa	Sun City	Pilanesberg International Airport	Terminated	
South Africa	Ulundi	Ulundi Airport	Terminated	
South Africa	Umtata	Mthatha Airport	Terminated	
South Africa	Upington	Upington Airport	Terminated	
Spain	Las Palmas	Gran Canaria Airport	Terminated	
Spain	Madrid	Adolfo Suárez Madrid–Barajas Airport	Terminated	
Sri Lanka	Colombo	Bandaranaike International Airport	Terminated	
Switzerland	Zürich	Zürich Airport	Terminated	
Taiwan	Taipei	Taoyuan International Airport	Terminated	
Tanzania	Dar es Salaam	Julius Nyerere International Airport		
Thailand	Bangkok	Don Mueang International Airport	Terminated	
Uganda	Entebbe	Entebbe International Airport	Terminated	
United Arab Emirates	Abu Dhabi	Zayed International Airport	Terminated	
United Kingdom	London	Heathrow Airport	Terminated	
United States	Houston	George Bush Intercontinental Airport	Terminated	
United States	Miami	Miami International Airport	Terminated	
United States	New York City	John F. Kennedy International Airport	Terminated	
United States	Washington, D.C.	Washington Dulles International Airport	Terminated	
Zambia	Livingstone	Harry Mwanga Nkumbula International Airport	Terminated	
Zambia	Lusaka	Kenneth Kaunda International Airport		
Zambia	Ndola	Ndola Airport	Terminated	
Zimbabwe	Bulawayo	Joshua Mqabuko Nkomo International Airport	Terminated	
Zimbabwe	Harare	Robert Gabriel Mugabe International Airport		
Zimbabwe	Victoria Falls	Victoria Falls Airport		

== See also ==
- Transport in South Africa
