= South African Weather Service =

Meteorological agency of South Africa

National Weather Service overview
- Formed: 2001; 25 years ago
- Type: Weather service
- Jurisdiction: South Africa
- Headquarters: Pretoria, Gauteng, South Africa; 25°53′26″S 28°10′15″E
- National Weather Service executive: Jonas Mphepya, Acting CEO
- Parent department: Department of Environmental Affairs and Tourism
- Website: .weathersa.co.za

The South African Weather Service (SAWS) is the meteorological service under the South African government's Department of Environmental Affairs and Tourism. SAWS is a member of the World Meteorological Organization.

== History ==
The SAWS traces its lineage to the Cape of Good Hope Meteorological Commission, established in October 1860. The Union of South Africa's Weather Service was established in 1912 under the Department of Irrigation, with Charles M Stewart as its first Chief Meteorologist.

At some point between 1912 and 1940, the SAWS' name was changed to the Meteorological Service, and in 1940, during the Second World War, became the responsibility of the Department of Defence.

In 1949, the Meteorological Service was transferred to the Department of Transport, and became the South African Weather Bureau.

The agency became housed under the Department of Environmental Affairs in 1986.

Under the South African Weather Service Act (No. 8 of 2001) effective 15 July 2001, the Weather Bureau became the South African Weather Service, a public entity.

== Data acquisition ==
=== Weather stations ===
South Africa operates a significant number of weather stations in South Africa as well as stations at Gough Island, Marion Island and Antarctica in cooperation with the South African National Antarctic Programme.

List of South African Weather Stations

Name	WMO #	ICAO	Location
Alexander Bay	406	FAAB	28°34′S 16°32′E
Aliwal North	546	FAAN	30°43′S 26°43′E
Babanango	488		28°23′S 31°5′E
Beaufort West	728	FABY	32°21′S 22°35′E
Bethal	370		26°27′S 29°29′E
Bethlehem Airport	461	FABM	28°15′S 28°20′E
Bethlehem	462		28°10′S 28°46′E
Bisho Airport	752		32°50′S 27°27′E
Bloemfontein Airport	442	FABL	29°6′S 26°18′E
Calvinia	618	FACV	31°28′S 19°46′E
Cape Agulhas	920		34°50′S 20°1′E
Cape Columbine	712		32°50′S 17°51′E
Cape Point	916		34°21′S 18°30′E
Cape Saint Francis	938		34°12′S 24°50′E
Cape Saint Lucia	496		28°30′S 32°24′E
Cape Town International Airport	816	FACT	33°59′S 18°36′E
Carolina	380	FACL	26°4′S 30°7′E
Cedara	580		29°32′S 30°17′E
Cradock	744		32°10′S 25°37′E
De Aar	536	FADA	30°39′S 24°1′E
De Aar	538	FADY	30°38′S 23°55′E
Döhne	754		32°31′S 27°28′E
Douglas	530		29°4′S 23°45′E
Durban International Airport	588	FADN	29°58′S 30°57′E
East London Airport	858	FAEL	33°2′S 27°50′E
Ellisras	156	FAER	23°43′35″S 27°41′18″E
Estcourt	478		29°00′S 29°53′E
Fauresmith	542		29°46′S 25°19′E
Fleur De Lys	292		24°32′S 31°2′E
Frankfort	362	FAFF	27°16′S 28°30′E
Fraserburg	624	FAFR	31°55′S 21°31′E
George Airport	828	FAGG	34°00′S 22°23′E
Germiston	369		26°15′S 28°9′E
Gough Island	906	FAGE	40°21′S 9°53′W
Graaff Reinet	736	FAGR	32°15′S 24°32′E
Graskop	286		24°56′S 30°50′E
Hoedspruit	290	FAHS	24°22′S 31°2′E
Jansenville	738		32°56′S 24°40′E
Kimberley Airport	438	FAKM	28°48′S 24°46′E
Klerksdorp	347	FAKD	26°52′S 26°43′E
Kroonstad	352		27°40′S 27°15′E
Kuruman	332		27°28′S 23°26′E
Ladysmith	476	FALY	28°34′S 29°46′E
AFB Langebaanweg	714	FALW	32°58′S 18°10′E
Levubu	182		23°5′S 30°17′E
Lydenburg	184		25°6′S 30°28′E
Macuville	180		22°16′S 29°54′E
Mafikeng	242	FAMM	25°47′S 25°32′E
Makatini	400		27°24′S 32°11′E
Mara	176		23°9′S 29°34′E
Marion Island	994	FAME	46°53′S 37°52′E
Marnitz	162		23°9′S 28°13′E
Matatiele	570		30°21′S 28°48′E
Middelburg	638	FAMB	31°29′S 25°2′E
Mossel Bay	928	FAMO	34°11′S 22°9′E
Nelspruit	288	FANS	25°26′S 30°59′E
Newcastle	378		27°44′S 29°55′E
O. R. Tambo International Airport	368	FAOR	26°8′S 28°14′E
Ottosdal	342		26°49′S 26°1′E
Oudestad	272		25°11′S 29°20′E
Oudtshoorn	826	FAOH	33°34′S 22°13′E
Phalaborwa	190	FAPH	23°56′S 31°9′E
Pietersburg	174	FAPB	23°52′S 29°27′E
Piet Retief	388		27°2′S 30°48′E
Pilansberg	250		25°20′S 27°10′E
Plessisdraai	344		27°59′S 26°8′E
Pofadder	416		29°8′S 19°23′E
Port Elizabeth Airport	842	FAPE	33°59′S 25°36′E
Port Nolloth	408		29°14′S 16°52′E
Port Shepstone	584		30°44′S 30°27′E
Port St Johns	674	FAPJ	31°38′S 29°33′E
Postmasburg	430		28°19′S 23°4′E
Potchefstroom Agric.	350		26°44′S 27°4′E
Potchefstroom Upper-Air	351		26°40′S 27°6′E
Potgietersrus	276		24°11′S 29°1′E
Pretoria (Irene)	263	FAIR	25°55′S 28°13′E
Pretoria	262	FAPR	25°44′S 28°11′E
Prieska	528		29°40′S 22°45′E
Queenstown	648	FAQT	31°54′S 26°52′E
Richard Bay	498	FARB	28°48′S 32°6′E
Riversdale	926		34°5′S 21°15′E
Robertson	718		33°50′S 19°54′E
Rustenburg	252		25°43′S 27°18′E
Shaleburn	572		29°48′S 29°21′E
Sheeprun	564		30°59′S 28°23′E
Skukuza	296		24°59′S 31°36′E
Somerset East	742		32°44′S 25°35′E
Springbok	512	FASB	29°40′S 17°52′E
Standerton	372		26°56′S 29°14′E
Sutherland	722		32°23′S 20°40′E
Taung	336		27°33′S 24°46′E
Thabazimbi	254		24°35′S 27°25′E
Thohoyandou	192		22°58′S 30°30′E
Touws River	818		33°21′S 20°3′E
Tristan Da Cunha	902	FATC	37°3′S 12°19′W
Tswelopele	284		24°39′S 30°17′E
Twee Riviere	322		26°28′S 20°37′E
Tzaneen	186		23°50′S 30°9′E
Umtata	668	FAUT	31°32′S 28°40′E
Upington Airport	424	FAUP	28°24′S 21°16′E
Vanwyksvlei	524		30°21′S 21°49′E
Vanzylsrus	330		26°53′S 22°3′E
Vredendal	614	FAVR	31°40′S 18°30′E
Vryburg	338	FAVB	26°57′S 24°38′E
Warmbaths	268		24°54′S 28°20′E
AFB Waterkloof	264	FAWK	25°50′S 28°13′E
Welkom	346	FAWM	28°00′S 26°40′E
Wepener	550		29°44′S 27°2′E
Willowmore	832		33°17′S 23°30′E

=== Weather radar ===
Near real-time (~5 minutes delay) weather radar is available for most of the country, even within the Kruger National Park.

=== Marine weather buoys ===
Between 30 and 40 drifting weather buoys are deployed annually.

== Weather modification ==
The SAWS, in cooperation with a number of other entities, is actively involved in weather control research under the South African National Precipitation Research and Rainfall Enhancement Programme, specifically with the Bethlehem Precipitation Research Project.

== See also ==
- South African National Antarctic Programme
- World Meteorological Organization
