= List of busiest airports in South Africa =

The following is a list of the busiest airports by annual passenger traffic in South Africa.

== Statistics (2004–2024) ==
All information below is sourced from the annual statistics published by the Airports Company South Africa. Figures are between 1 April and 31 March the following year. Airports not controlled by the Airports Company South Africa do not generally publish or are delayed when updating their passenger statistics. Airports without official statistics have been displayed as current seat capacity on regularly scheduled flights. These seats, although not always full, give an accurate number of passengers expected.

Airport	Location	Code (IATA/ICAO)	2024–25	2023–24	2022–23	2021–22	2020–21	2019–20	2018–19	2017–18	2016–17	2015–16	2014–15	2013–14	2012–13	2011–12	2010–11	2009–10	2008–09	2007–08	2006–07	2005–06	2004–05	Notes
O. R. Tambo International Airport	Johannesburg, Gauteng	JNB/FAOR	18,533,673	17,852,569	15,622,216	9,633,154	4,063,739	20,903,566	21,313,943	21,231,510	20,692,780	20,374,998	19,135,093	18,820,988	18,621,259	19,004,001	18,664,728	17,596,203	17,884,859	19,457,798	17,794,100	16,078,440	14,555,364	
Cape Town International Airport	Cape Town, Western Cape	CPT/FACT	10,494,994	10,034,352	8,407,751	5,700,811	2,386,121	10,688,798	10,823,737	10,752,246	10,211,390	9,659,589	8,755,872	8,392,989	8,434,799	8,576,709	8,225,422	7,810,069	7,813,170	8,426,618	7,518,543	6,834,173	6,214,903	
King Shaka International Airport	Durban, KwaZulu-Natal	DUR/FALE	5,042,922	4,994,178	4,307,419	3,215,925	1,502,286	6,099,628	5,993,161	5,624,170	5,220,002	4,930,155	4,524,894	4,465,088	4,668,467	5,040,094	4,873,571	–						
Durban International Airport	Durban, KwaZulu-Natal	~~DUR/FADN~~	Closed															4,403,340		4,792,553	4,257,714	3,698,044	3,209,263	
Lanseria International Airport	Johannesburg, Gauteng	HLA/FALA			2,482,872																			(Note: 2019 Statistics)
Chief Dawid Stuurman International Airport	Gqeberha, Eastern Cape	PLZ/FAPE	1,519,612	1,427,483	1,191,225	904,396	425,364	1,689,914	1,689,808	1,641,393	1,582,493	1,604,381	1,350,744	1,251,178	1,311,553	1,364,976	1,416,922	1,349,673		1,512,924	1,438,845	1,303,747	1,098,679	
George Airport	George, Western Cape	GRJ/FAGG	833,455	803,184	757,567	609,069	267,816	830,118	835,906	801,480	738,641	718,881	615,688	572,130	544,306	575,799	545,206	537,600		666,781	597,910	584,562	474,024	
King Phalo Airport	East London, Eastern Cape	ELS/FAEL	830,442	832,251	714,598	643,437	315,792	916,192	840,225	816,154	793,832	726,049	638,012	664,684	644,520	681,529	778,184	676,982		741,290	696,515	590,606	449,843	
Bram Fischer International Airport	Bloemfontein, Free State	BFN/FABL	387,009	346,373	318,135	204,692	73,071	357,391	355,052	396,725	395,452	393,471	363,895	382,155	411,655	441,954	417,642	397,228		412,873	353,723	254,805	229,887	
Eastgate Airport	Hoedspruit, Mpumalanga	HDS/FAHS			264,992																			(Note: 35 weekly flights (21 Johannesburg 1,512 Seats) (14 Cape Town 1036 Seats) 2,548 x 52) (Note: Seat Capacity Calculation)
Kruger Mpumalanga International Airport	Mbombela, Mpumalanga	MQP/FAKN			260,000																			
Pietermaritzburg Airport	Pietermaritzburg, Kwa-Zulu Natal	PZB/FAPM			144,458																			(Note: 25 weekly flights on Airlink (17 E135, 1 E170 and 7 E190) 1,389 weekly seats x 52) (Note: Seat Capacity Calculation)
Kimberley Airport	Kimberley, Northern Cape	KIM/FAKM	162,776	155,292	137,875	93,626	35,813	153,913	161,168	171,933	177,260	166,960	160,442	157225	151,405	140,298	132,830	131,885		150,590	132,358	115,506	97,837	
Upington Airport	Upington, Northern Cape	UTN/FAUP	56,881	53,740	49,818	29,249	10,894	52,873	62,499	66,974	65,292	68,800	74,297	65,387	55,726	52,224	48,498	42,229		48,765	40,631	33,192	31,123	
Skukuza Airport	Skukuza, Mpumalanga	SZK/FASZ			85,904																			(Note: 21 weekly flights (14 Johannesburg 567 Seats) (7 Cape Town 259 Seats) 829 x 52) (Note: Seat Capacity Calculation)
Mthatha Airport	Mthatha, Eastern Cape	UTT/FAUT			76,960																			(Note: 20 weekly flights on Airlink (20 E135) 740 weekly seats x 52) (Note: Seat Capacity Calculation)
Sishen Airport	Sishen, Northern Cape	SIS/FASS			73,112																			(Note: 19 weekly flights on Airlink (19 E135) 705 weekly seats x 52) (Note: Seat Capacity Calculation)
Polokwane Airport	Polokwane, Limpopo	PTG/FAPP			69,264																			(Note: 18 weekly flights on Airlink (18 E135) 666 weekly seats x 52) (Note: Seat Capacity Calculation)
Plettenberg Bay Airport	Plettenburg Bay, Western Cape	PBZ/FAPG			57,200																			
Richards Bay Airport	Richards Bay, Kwa-Zulu Natal	RCB/FARB			51,272																			(Note: 17 weekly flights on Airlink (17 BJ41) 493 weekly seats x 52) (Note: Seat Capacity Calculation)
Margate Airport	Margate, Kwa-Zulu Natal	MGH/FAMG			31,200																			(Note: 6 weekly flights on Cemair (6 DASH 8-300) 300 weekly seats x 52) (Note: Seat Capacity Calculation)

== See also ==
- List of airports in South Africa
