= Andrew's Field Airport =

Airport in South Africa

- IATA: none; ICAO: FAAF

Summary
- Operator: South African Civil Aviation Authority
- Serves: Struisbaai
- Elevation AMSL: 30 ft / 9 m
- Coordinates: 34°45′48″S 20°02′11″E
- Website: caa.co.za
- Interactive map of Andrew's Field Airport

Runways
Direction	Length		Surface
Direction	m	ft	Surface
0	1,090	3,576	Asphalt

Andrew's Field Airport is next to Molshoop in Overberg District Municipality, Western Cape, South Africa.

== See also ==
- List of airports in South Africa
