= Kroonstad Airport =

- IATA: none; ICAO: FAKS

Summary
- Airport type: Public
- Serves: Kroonstad, Free State, South Africa
- Elevation AMSL: 4,700 ft (1,400 m)
- Coordinates: 27°39′38″S 27°18′56″E

Map
- Location of airport in Free State province Location of Free State in South Africa

Runways
Direction	Length		Surface
Direction	m	ft	Surface
07/25	1,775	5,823	Asphalt
12/30	1,200	3,937	Grass
03/21	900	2,953	Grass
- Sources: South African AIP, DAFIF

Kroonstad Airport (ICAO: FAKS) is an airport serving Kroonstad in the Free State province of South Africa.

== Facilities ==
The airport resides at an elevation of 4,700 feet (1,433 m) above mean sea level. It has one asphalt paved runway designated 07/25 which measures 1,775 by 14 metres (5,823 ft × 46 ft); it also has two grass runways: 12/30 is 1,200 by 30 metres (3,937 ft × 98 ft) and 03/21 is 900 by 30 metres (2,953 ft × 98 ft).

== See also ==
- List of airports in South Africa
- List of South African airports by passenger movements
