= Saldanha Airport =

Saldanha Airport Saldanha Lughawe
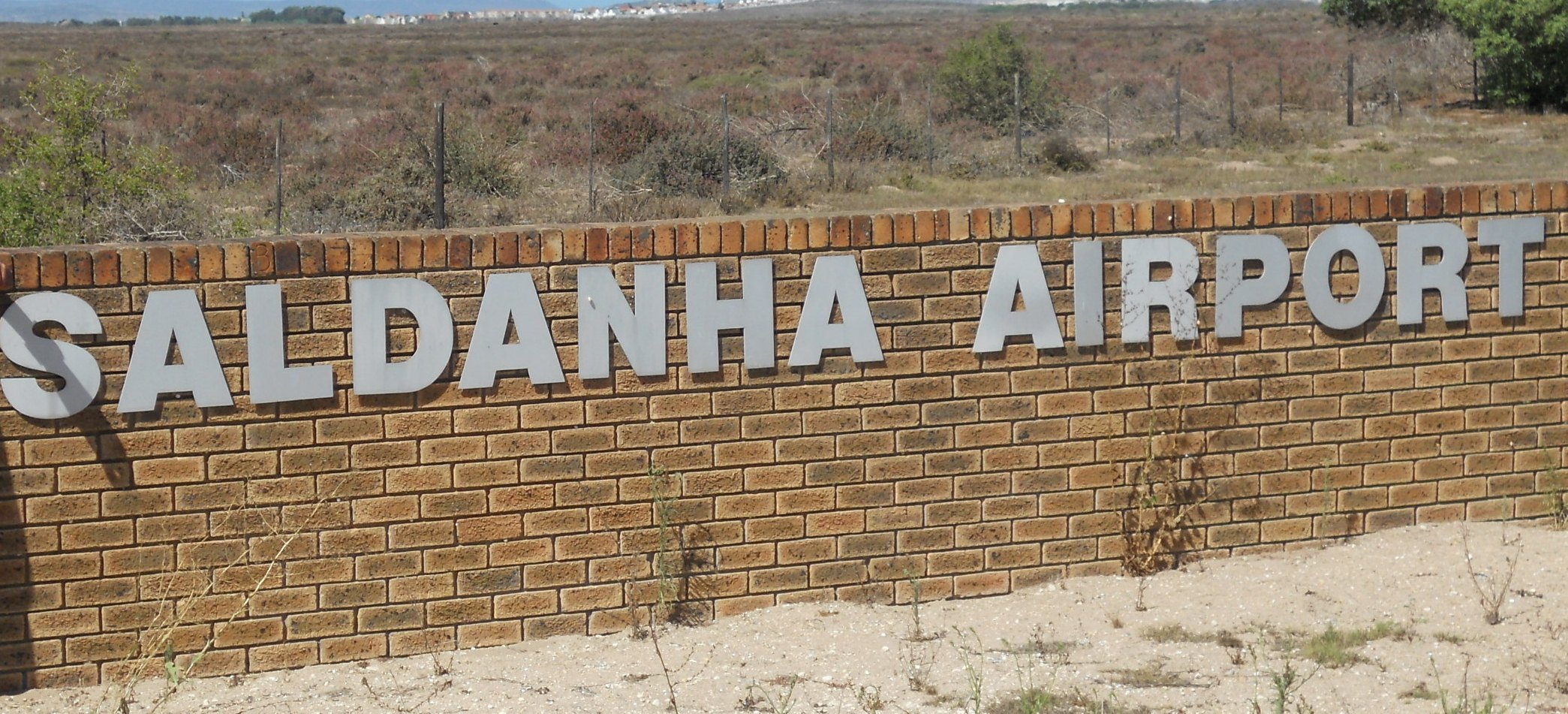
- IATA: none; ICAO: FASD

Summary
- Operator: West Coast Flying Club
- Location: Saldanha Bay Local Municipality, Western Cape, South Africa
- Elevation AMSL: 15 m / 50 ft
- Coordinates: 32°57′48″S 17°58′12″E

Map
- Location in the Western Cape.

Runways
Direction	Length		Surface
Direction	m	ft	Surface
02/20	1,422	4,665	Asphalt
- Source: CAA

Saldanha Airport (ICAO: FASD) is a small airport located east of the R399 road, between the towns of Saldanha and Vredenburg in the Western Cape province of South Africa. The West Coast Flying Club has operated from the airport since 1984. The airport also hosts the West Coast Airshow.

== Facilities ==
The airport has a single asphalt runway. The runway is used primarily by light aircraft. The airfield operates under visual flight rules and does not have scheduled commercial airline services.

== See also ==
- List of airports in South Africa
