= OUH =

OUH may refer to:

- Odense University Hospital, in Southern Denmark
- Oulu University Hospital, in Oulu, Finland
- IATA code for Oudtshoorn Airport in Oudtshoorn, South Africa
- Oxford University Hospitals NHS Foundation Trust in the UK
