= FAPL (disambiguation) =

FAPL may refer to:

- Freedom Alliance Party of Liberia
- FA Premier League, a professional football league in England
- Pongola Airport, South Africa by ICAO-code
- Farnworth Area Pool League, an amateur pool league affiliated to the English Pool Association (EPA)
