= Vryburg Airport =

- IATA: VRU; ICAO: FAVB

Summary
- Airport type: Public
- Owner: Naledi Local Municipality
- Operator: Naledi Local Municipality
- Serves: Vryburg, North West, South Africa
- Elevation AMSL: 3,920 ft / 1,195 m
- Coordinates: 26°58′51″S 024°43′42″E

Map
- Location in the North West Province VRU (South Africa)

Runways
Direction	Length		Surface
Direction	m	ft	Surface
18/36	1,200	3,937	Asphalt
- Source: DAFIF

Vryburg Airport (IATA: VRU, ICAO: FAVB) is an airport serving Vryburg, a town in the North West province, South Africa. It is located approximately 2.5 kilometers south of the Vryburg CBD.

== History ==
In 1919 the Royal Air Force built the first airport in Vryburg. It was located to the north of the town and west of the Gert Lubbe Sports Grounds. The area was originally identified by Major Court Treatt as a landing strip for the regular flights between Cairo and Cape Town. At that time the town council rented the terrain to the Royal Air Force for 10 cents a year.

The current airport, which is located south of Vryburg was completed during March 1939. At that stage it could accommodate any existing aircraft type. The airport was used by the South African Department of Defence during the Second World War. After the end of the Second World War the Department of Defence notified the town council that it would no longer require the airport for defence purposes. The town council decided that it would continue the operation of the airport and applied to the Director of Civil Aviation (now the South African Civil Aviation Authority) for an aerodrome license and on 1 November the license application was granted.

Northern Cape Flying Services was granted permission to construct a hangar on 3 August 1946. The first buildings, a fuel bowser and a telephone service followed.

On 8 February 1957 the Bechuanaland District Development Agency requested that the Central Government consider upgrading the airport and that a regular air service be implemented. This was however rejected as the airport at that time could not accommodate the Douglas DC-3 Dakota type aircraft.

In February 1967 Interstate Air Services initiated an airline between Vryburg, Kuruman, Sishen and Silverstreams. This service was taken over by United Air in the early 1970s but was discontinued temporarily in 1974 due to the deterioration of the runway.

The terminal building at the airport was officially opened by the Deputy Minister of Home Affairs, Mr. Piet Badenhorst on 14 August 1981.

== Accidents ==
On 28 October 2008, a Cessna 210 returning from a survey flight, experienced an engine failure and performed a forced landing approximately 600 metres west of the airport. The pilot (sole occupant) escaped unharmed. The aircraft was part of a geological survey operation that was conducted in the area.

On 6 October 2019, a Piper PA-28-140 Cherokee crashed in Huhudi, approximately 800 meters east of the threshold of runway 18.

== See also ==
- List of airports in South Africa
