= Graaff Reinet Airport =

Graaff-Reinet Airport
- IATA: none; ICAO: FAGR

Summary
- Location: Graaff-Reinet, Dr Beyers Naudé Local Municipality, Eastern Cape, South Africa
- Elevation AMSL: 2,606 ft / 794 m
- Coordinates: 32°11′33″S 024°32′25″E

Map
- Location of Graaff-Reinet in South Africa

Runways
Direction	Length		Surface
Direction	m	ft	Surface
04/22	1,500	4,921	Asphalt
15/33	854	2,802	Grass
- Sources: Sources: CAA

Graaff-Reinet Airport (ICAO: FAGR) (Afrikaans: Graaff-Reinet Lughawe) is a small airport located in Graaff-Reinet, a town in the Eastern Cape province of South Africa.

The airport primarily serves as a hub for aviation training and is home to the Eagle’s Wings Microlight School. While no scheduled flights operate from the airport, private charter jets provide transportation to and from the facility.

== Aerodrome Information ==
The airport resides at an elevation of 2,606 feet (794 m) above mean sea level. It has two runways: 04/22 has an asphalt surface measuring 1,500 by 23 metres (4,921 ft × 75 ft) and 15/33 with a grass surface measuring 854 by 30 metres (2,802 ft × 98 ft).

== See also ==
- Graaff-Reinet
- List of airports in South Africa
