= Oudtshoorn Airport =

Coordinates: 33°36′00″S 22°11′00″E

- IATA: none; ICAO: FAOH

Summary
- Location: Oudtshoorn
- Elevation AMSL: 1,063 ft (324 m)
- Interactive map of Oudtshoorn Airport

Runways
Direction	Length		Surface
Direction	m	ft	Surface
04/22	1,701	5,581	Asphalt
- Source: CAA

Oudtshoorn Airport is a small airport that serves the town of Oudtshoorn in the Western Cape province of South Africa.

== See also ==
- List of airports in South Africa
- Transport in South Africa
