= Barberton Airport =

- IATA: none; ICAO: FABR

Summary
- Location: Barberton, Mpumalanga, South Africa
- Elevation AMSL: 2,250 ft / 681 m
- Coordinates: 25°43′03″S 30°58′30″E
- Interactive map of Barberton Airport

Runways
Direction	Length		Surface
Direction	m	ft	Surface
17/35	1,000	3,300	Grass

Barberton Airport (ICAO: FABR) is an airport serving Barberton and surrounding areas in Mpumalanga province in South Africa.

The airport elevation is 2,250 feet (690 m) above mean sea level. Runway: 17/35 grass surface measuring 1,000 by 15 metres (3,300 × 49 ft). Runway lights

== See also ==
- List of airports in South Africa
