= Klerksdorp Airport =

PC Pelser Airport PC Pelser Lughawe
- IATA: KXE; ICAO: FAKD

Summary
- Airport type: public/ medium-sized
- Owner: City of Matlosana
- Operator: South African Civil Aviation Authority
- Location: Klerksdorp, South Africa
- Time zone: SAST (+2)
- Elevation AMSL: 4,444 ft / 1,355 m
- Coordinates: 26°51′46″S 26°42′37″E
- Interactive map of PC Pelser Airport

Runways
Direction	Length		Surface
Direction	ft	m	Surface
18/36	16,145	4,921	Asphalt

PC Pelser Airport is a South African airport located in the city of Klerksdorp.

== History ==
In April 1912, an airplane was first seen in Klerksdorp. Twenty years later, in 1932, the city council decided to build an airfield on the western town grounds and in 1937 a flying club was founded. The airport was located on the site of the current prison, west of the road to Orkney. Mr. Jimmy Oosthuizen, who was a well-known lawyer in the town until his death in 1985, won the Governor General's Trophy for the town in 1938.

During the Second World War, the airport was leased by the city council to the government for a nominal sum of R2 per year.

Later it was moved to the present site, south of the cemetery, and in 1964 to Mr. P.C. Pelser, then Member of Parliament for Klerksdorp and later named Minister of Justice.
