= Beeshoek mine =

Iron ore mine in Northern Cape, South Africa

- Location of mine in South Africa

Location
- Location: Northern Cape, South Africa; 28°23′00″S 22°58′30″E

Production
- Products: Iron ore

The Beeshoek mine is a large iron mine located near Postmasburg in the Northern Cape province of South Africa. Beeshoek represents one of the largest iron ore reserves in South Africa and in the world, having estimated reserves of 117.5 million tonnes of ore grading 63.7% iron metal.
