= Pongola Airport =

- IATA: none; ICAO: FAPL

Summary
- Airport type: Public
- Serves: Pongola, KwaZulu-Natal, South Africa
- Elevation AMSL: 942 ft / 287 m
- Coordinates: 27°21′42″S 31°36′20″E

Map
- Location in KwaZulu-Natal

Runways
Direction	Length		Surface
Direction	m	ft	Surface
16/34	698	2,290	Asphalt

Pongola Airport (ICAO: FAPL) is an airport serving Pongola, a town in the KwaZulu-Natal, South Africa.

== Facilities ==
The airport resides at an elevation of 942 feet (287 m) above mean sea level. It has one runway designated 16/34 with an asphalt surface measuring 698 by 18 metres (2,290 ft × 59 ft). It only services light local traffic.

== See also ==
- List of airports in South Africa
