= Heidelberg Airport =

- IATA: none; ICAO: FAHG

Summary
- Airport type: Small Airport
- Serves: Heidelberg
- Location: Heidelberg, Gauteng
- Elevation AMSL: 5,067 ft / 1,544 m
- Coordinates: 26°30′30″S 28°23′30″E

Map
- Location in South Africa

Runways
Direction	Length		Surface
Direction	m	ft	Surface
06/24	1,200	3,937	Asphalt
- Source: FAHG SkyVector

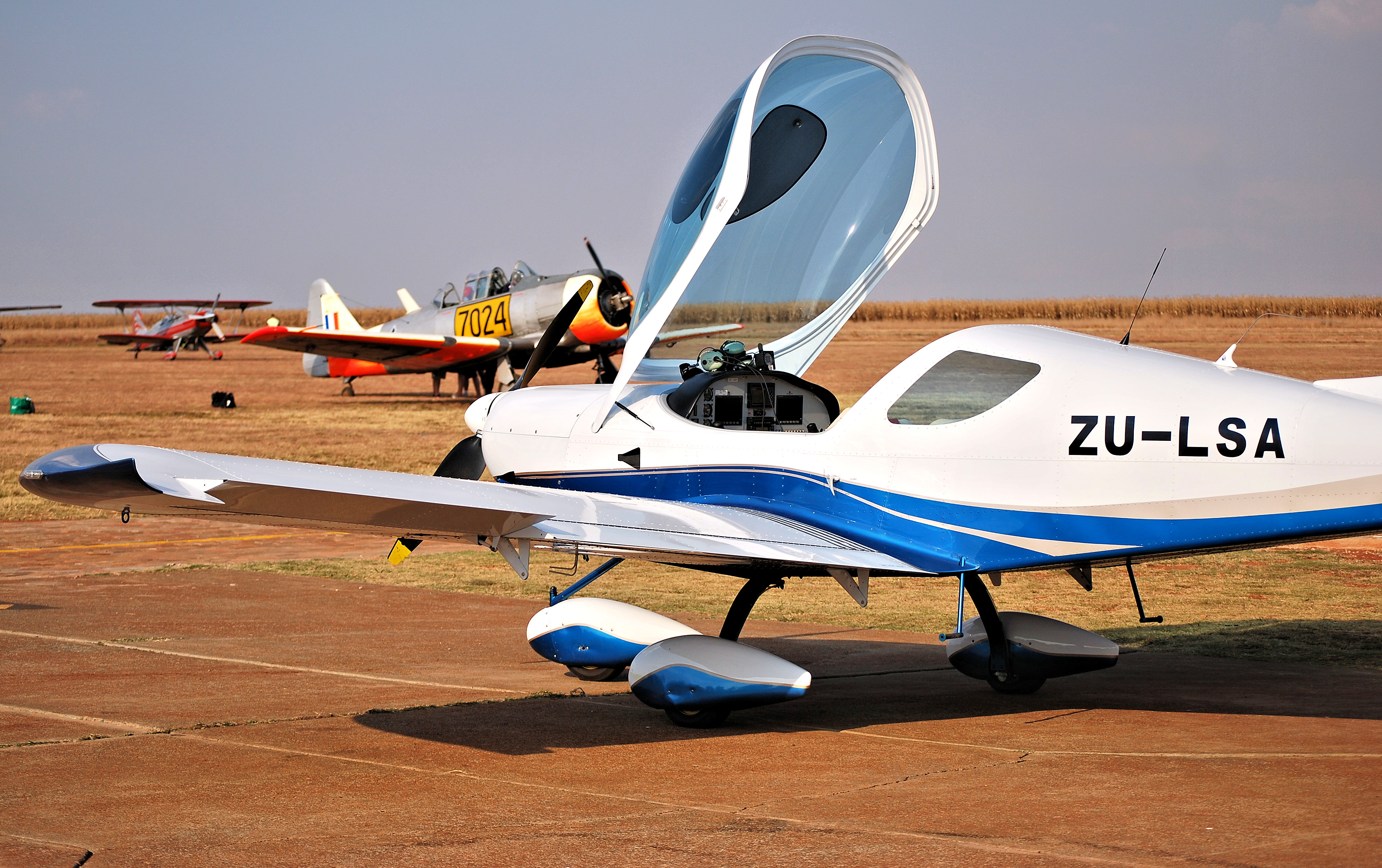
A CZAW SportCruiser at the airport

Heidelberg Airport (ICAO: FAHG) is a small airport located in Heidelberg, South Africa. The airport is registered at a Category 2 aerodrome and managed by the Heidelberg Aviation Association. It mainly accommodates light and ultra-light aircraft.

The Heidelberg Aviation Association maintains and improves the facilities with funds mainly collected from its members

A medical helipad named "The David Powell Aeromedical Rescue Facility" has been added for medical evacuation and transfers.

The facility was officially opened by the wife and brother of the late David Powell on 18 November 2017 accompanied by his wife and a large crowd of aviators, friends and medical staff from Emer-G-Med and Netcare 911.

A flight school named Inversion Flight Academy has been operating here since 2016.

== Airfield information ==
- Communication Frequencies
- Heidelberg Airport 125.90 MHz
- Only Left hand circuits.
- Runways 06-24
- Elevation 5118'

Runway 16-34 grass is closed
