= Ulundi Airport =

Ulundi Airport Ulundi Lughawe
- IATA: ULD; ICAO: FAUL

Summary
- Airport type: Public
- Owner: Zululand District Municipality
- Operator: Zululand District Municipality
- Location: Ulundi, South Africa
- Elevation AMSL: 1,720 ft (520 m)
- Coordinates: 28°19′14″S 31°24′59″E

Map
- Location in KwaZulu-Natal

Runways
Direction	Length		Surface
Direction	m	ft	Surface
02/20	1,034	3,395	Asphalt
05/23	1,640	5,381	Asphalt

Ulundi Airport (IATA: ULD, ICAO: FAUL) is an airport serving the towns of Ulundi, Nongoma and Melmoth in the Zululand Municipal District of KwaZulu-Natal, South Africa. Its official name is the Prince Mangosuthu Buthelezi Airport. The airport is situated 1 km south-west of the entrance to the Ulundi Central Business District at the intersection of the R66 and the P700. The Ulundi airport is in close proximity to the Hluhluwe-iMfolozi Park, and the EMakhosini Ophathe Heritage Park.

== Airport facilities ==
The airport has a fully staffed and equipped rescue and fire department is on site and is qualified to operate at category 4 – 5 levels. The Airport precinct has extensive terminal facilities, hangar space, land for development, parking for aircraft and automobiles, a fuel depot, hangar space and a fully operational radio navigational approach system.

The Ulundi airport was built as an international gateway to the Zulu kingdom and its 1,750 metre-long main runway can accommodate 737 jet airliners.

== Airlines and destinations ==
Airlines	Destinations
Federal Air	Johannesburg–O. R. Tambo, Phinda, Pietermaritzburg

== See also ==
- List of airports in South Africa
