= Greytown Airport =

- IATA: none; ICAO: FAGY

Summary
- Airport type: Public
- Location: Greytown, KwaZulu-Natal, South Africa
- Elevation AMSL: 3,531 ft (1,076 m)
- Coordinates: 29°07′24″S 030°35′56″E

Map
- Location in KwaZulu-Natal

Runways
Direction	Length		Surface
Direction	m	ft	Surface
06/24	1,624	5,328	Asphalt
- Sources: South African AIP, DAFIF

Greytown Airport (ICAO: FAGY) is an airport serving Greytown, a town in the KwaZulu-Natal province in South Africa.

== Facilities ==
The airport resides at an elevation of 3,531 feet (1,076 m) above mean sea level. It has one runway designated 06/24 with an asphalt surface measuring 1,462 by 11 metres (4,797 ft × 36 ft).
