= Bethlehem Airport =

- IATA: none; ICAO: FABM

Summary
- Airport type: Public
- Operator: Municipal
- Location: Bethlehem, Free State, South Africa
- Elevation AMSL: 5,561 ft (1,695 m)
- Coordinates: 28°14′55″S 028°20′10″E

Map
- Location in the Free State

Runways
Direction	Length		Surface
Direction	m	ft	Surface
11/29	1,175	3,855	Asphalt
13/31	1,311	4,301	Grass
- Sources: Sources: South African AIP, DAFIF

Bethlehem Airport (ICAO: FABM) is an airport serving Bethlehem, a town in the Free State province in South Africa.

== Facilities ==
The airport resides at an elevation of 5,561 feet (1,695 m) above mean sea level. It has two runways: 11/29 has an asphalt surface measuring 1,175 by 15 metres (3,855 ft × 49 ft) and 13/31 with a grass surface measuring 1,311 by 46 metres (4,301 ft × 151 ft).

== See also ==
- List of airports in South Africa
