= Plettenberg Bay Aerodrome =

- IATA: PBZ; ICAO: FAPG

Summary
- Airport type: Public
- Owner/Operator: Bitou Local Municipality
- Serves: Plettenberg Bay, South Africa
- Elevation AMSL: 465 ft / 142 m
- Coordinates: 34°5′17.7″S 023°19′45.4″E
- Website: www.vrst.africa

Map
- Location of the airport FAPG (South Africa) FAPG (Africa)

Runways
Direction	Length		Surface
Direction	ft	m	Surface
12/30	4,068	1,240	asphalt

Plettenberg Bay Aerodrome (IATA: PBZ, ICAO: FAPG) is a small airport serving Plettenberg Bay, a town in the Western Cape province in South Africa.

== Airlines and destinations ==
Airlines	Destinations
CemAir	Cape Town, Johannesburg–O.R. Tambo

== See also ==
- List of airports in South Africa
