= Cape Town International Airport =

Airport in Cape Town, South Africa

Cape Town International Airport Kaapstad Internasionale Lughawe (Afrikaans) Isikhululo Seenqwelomoya saseKapa (Xhosa)

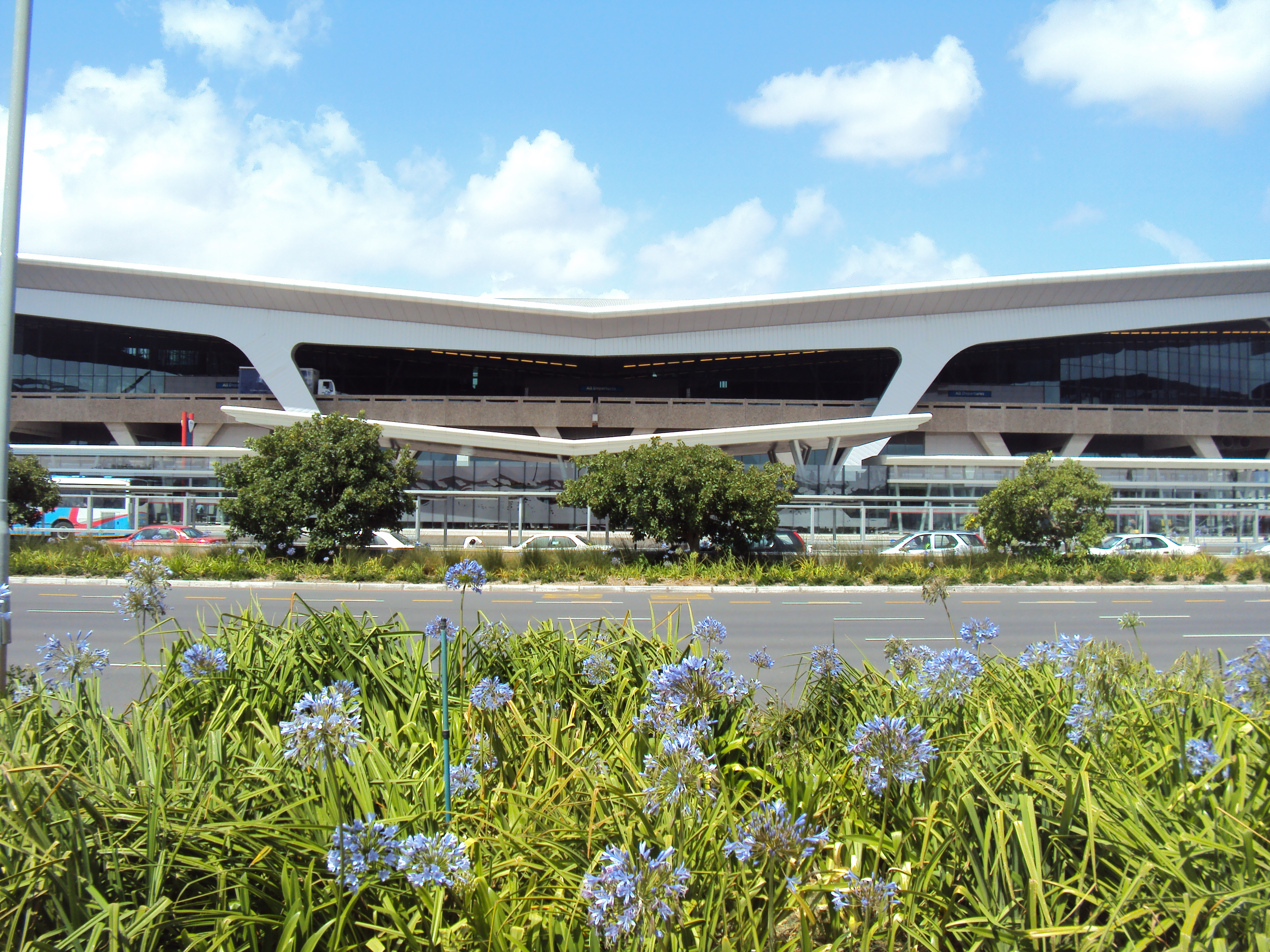
- IATA: CPT; ICAO: FACT; WMO: 68816

Summary
- Airport type: Public
- Owner/Operator: Airports Company South Africa
- Serves: City of Cape Town
- Location: Matroosfontein, Western Cape, South Africa
- Opened: 1954; 72 years ago
- Hub for: Airlink; FlySafair
- Focus city for: South African Airways
- Elevation AMSL: 46 m (151 ft)
- Coordinates: 33°58′10″S 018°35′50″E
- Website: Cape Town International Airport

Maps
- Interactive Map
- Location within the Cape Town metropolitan area CPT (Western Cape) CPT (South Africa) CPT (Africa)

Runways
Direction	Length		Surface
Direction	m	ft	Surface
01/19	3,201	10,502	Asphalt
16/34	1,701	5,581	Asphalt

Statistics (2025–2026)
- Passengers: 11,333,736
- Aircraft movements: 98,728
- Source: ACSA

Cape Town International Airport (IATA: CPT, ICAO: FACT), and sometimes abbreviated to CTIA, is the primary international airport serving the city of Cape Town, South Africa. It is the second-busiest airport in the country and fourth-busiest in Africa.

Located approximately 20 kilometres (12 mi) from the Cape Town CBD (the city's main economic hub), the airport was opened in 1954 to replace Cape Town's previous airport, Wingfield Aerodrome. Cape Town International Airport is the only airport in the Cape Town metropolitan area that offers scheduled passenger services. The airport has domestic and international terminals, linked by a common central terminal.

The airport has direct flights from South Africa's other two main urban areas, Johannesburg and Durban, as well as flights to smaller centres in South Africa. Internationally, it has direct flights to several destinations in Africa, and locations in the Middle East, Asia, Europe, South America, Australia, and the United States.

The air route between Cape Town and Johannesburg was the world's ninth-busiest air route in 2011 with an estimated 4.5 million passengers.

According to Airports Company South Africa, CTIA achieved an on-time performance (OTP) of 90.42% in 2025; above its target.

In 2025, Cape Town International was ranked as the Best Airport in the World in the AirHelp Score list, moving up one spot from the previous year. Based on visitor opinions, the airport performed particularly well in the categories of on-time performance and customer experience.

== History ==
D. F. Malan Airport was opened in 1954, a year after Jan Smuts Airport (now O. R. Tambo International Airport) on the Witwatersrand, near Johannesburg, opened. The airport replaced Cape Town's previous airport, Wingfield Aerodrome. Originally named Bellville Airport due to its proximity to the town of the same name, it initially served as a domestic airport. Then, at the request of the Bellville Federation of Taxpayers, the airport was renamed after the then South African prime minister. D.F. Malan National Airport soon achieved international airport status when a direct flight to Britain and a second flight to Britain via Johannesburg was introduced.

With the fall of apartheid in the early 1990s, ownership of the airport was transferred from the state to the newly formed Airports Company South Africa, and the airport was renamed to the politically neutral Cape Town International Airport. South African Airways launched a route to Miami in December 1992. In January 2000, the carrier replaced it with a flight to Atlanta, whose outbound leg from Cape Town included a stop in Fort Lauderdale.

The first years of the twenty-first century saw tremendous growth at the airport; from handling 6.2 million passengers per annum in 2004–05, the airport peaked at 8.4 million passengers per annum in 2007–08 before falling back to 7.8 million in 2008–09. In June 2008, Delta Air Lines started a flight to New York via Dakar. It used a Boeing 767 on the route. Delta began flying to Atlanta instead the following June. The company terminated the route in September 2009. In December 2011, Malaysia Airlines discontinued its service to Buenos Aires.

In 2016, the airport saw a 29% increase in international arrivals; 2016 also saw the airport handle 10 million passengers per annum. United Airlines commenced seasonal flights to Newark on a Boeing 787 in December 2019. The route became year-round in 2022. In October 2023, South African Airways inaugurated a link to São Paulo.

On 16 April 2018, it was reported in the Cape Times that the Minister of Transport, Bonginkosi Nzimande, had directed ACSA on 22 March 2018 to change the name of Cape Town International Airport to Nelson Mandela International Airport. The name change was discussed and as yet no name change had been published in the Government Gazette.

On 5 March 2019, the EFF filed a motion in Parliament calling for Cape Town International Airport to be renamed for anti-apartheid activist Winnie Madikizela-Mandela. Some Khoi activists, meanwhile, argued for the airport to be named after the !Uriǁ'aeǀona translator Krotoa. However, South Africa's Parliament was not constitutionally empowered to enact name changes: the South African Geographical Names Council (SAGNC) held that responsibility. The motion was unsuccessful.

In February 2021, the Cape Times reported that the proposed name change of the airport had been "quietly ditched".

In 2024, CTIA experienced its highest tourism passenger volumes on record. During 2024, the airport processed over 10 million passengers and 75,000 tons of cargo. Despite this, in early 2025, the airport reported even higher transit figures, with an 8% increase in domestic travel, a 5% increase in international arrivals, and a 56% increase in cargo volumes.

In October 2025, it was reported that, based on recent air travel statistics, numerous airlines were choosing to send an increasing number of outbound flights from SA via Cape Town International instead of via Johannesburg's O. R. Tambo International. Reasons include greater efficiency with immigration processing and reduced layover times in Cape Town, compared to Johannesburg.

In March 2026, it was reported that an increasing number of foreign passengers were choosing to travel via Cape Town International, rather than landing at O.R. Tambo (in Johannesburg), when visiting South Africa. CTIA's passenger numbers more than doubled between 2012 and 2026, whereas Joburg's have decreased during the same period. Similarly, while O.R. Tambo's total aircraft figures were roughly the same in 2026 as they were in 2012, those at Cape Town International had tripled over that period. Furthermore, there has been an increase over that period of the number of passengers (average capacity) carried by planes landing at CTIA.

In July 2026, Airports Company South Africa (ACSA) confirmed that the development of a large-scale solar power plant at Cape Town International was well underway. The project is set to have a peak generation capacity of at least 2.5 megawatts (MWp), with the goal of reducing the airport's reliance on the national grid, while also reducing operating costs and carbon emissions. ACSA said airports needed to make these kind of infrastructure investments. Following similar developments at airports in George, Kimberley, and Upington, Cape Town International will become SA's first major airport (international gateway) to have this kind of off-grid power setup.

== Infrastructure development ==
=== 2010 upgrades ===
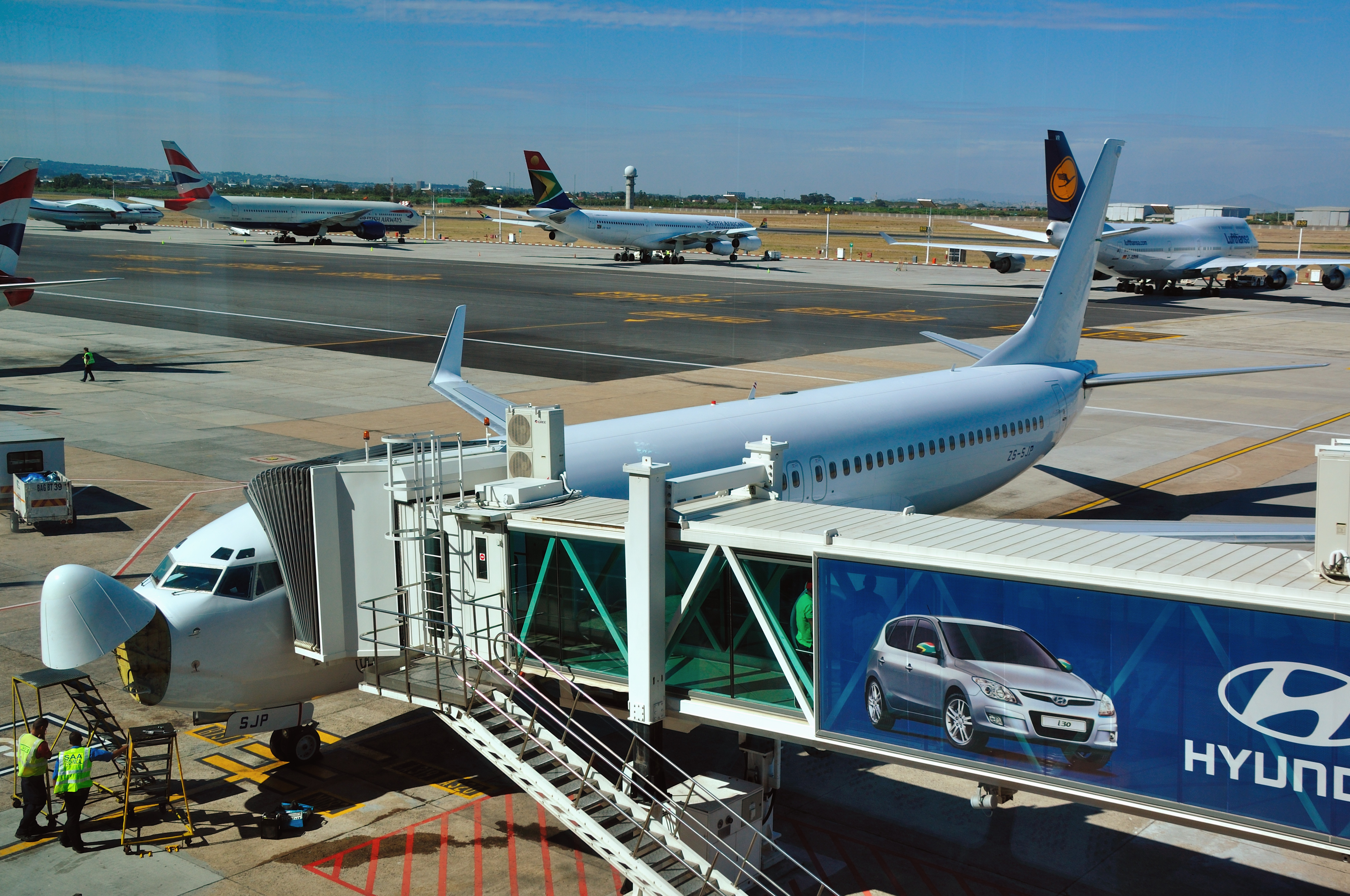
Apron view

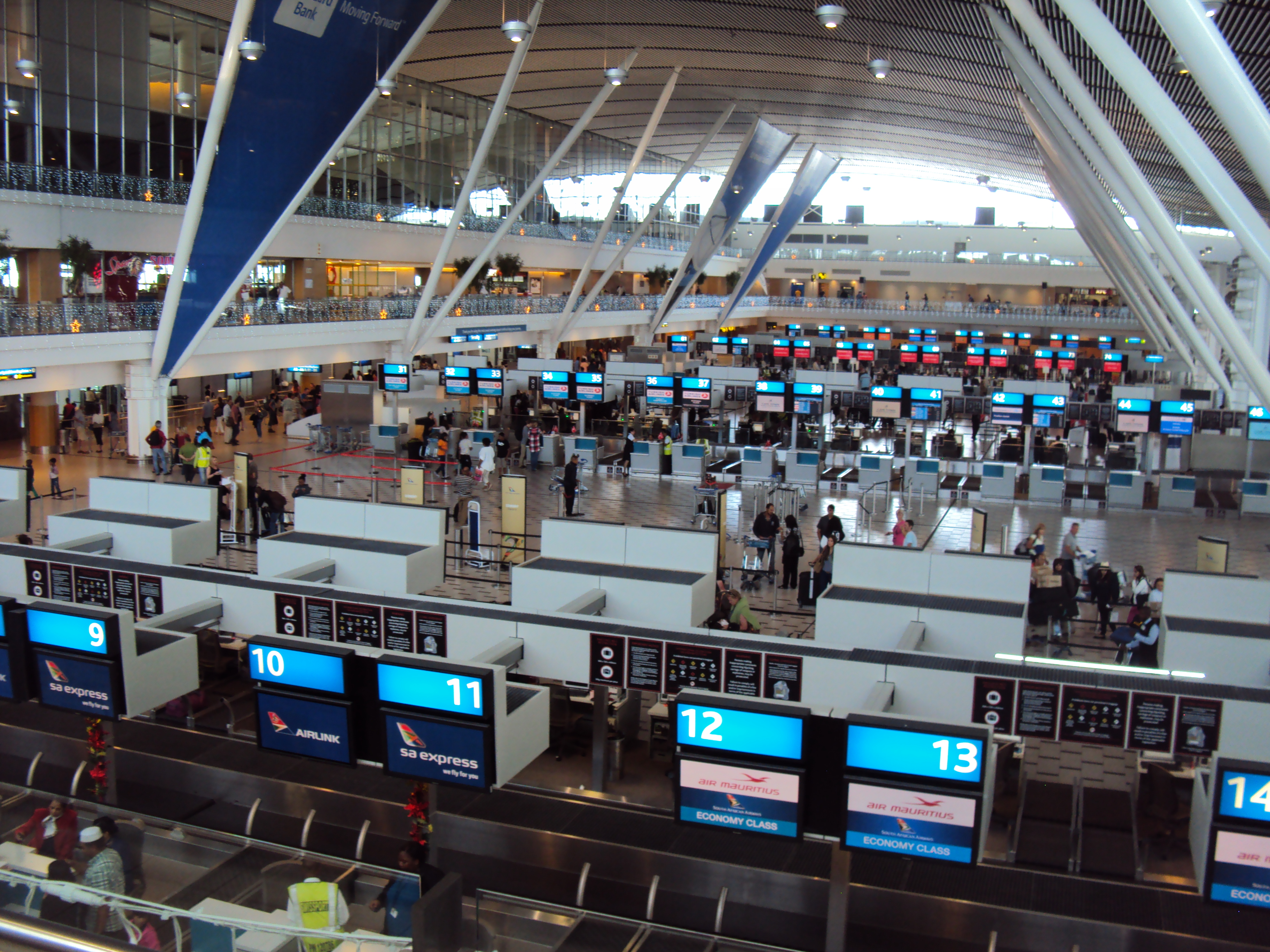
Check-in hall

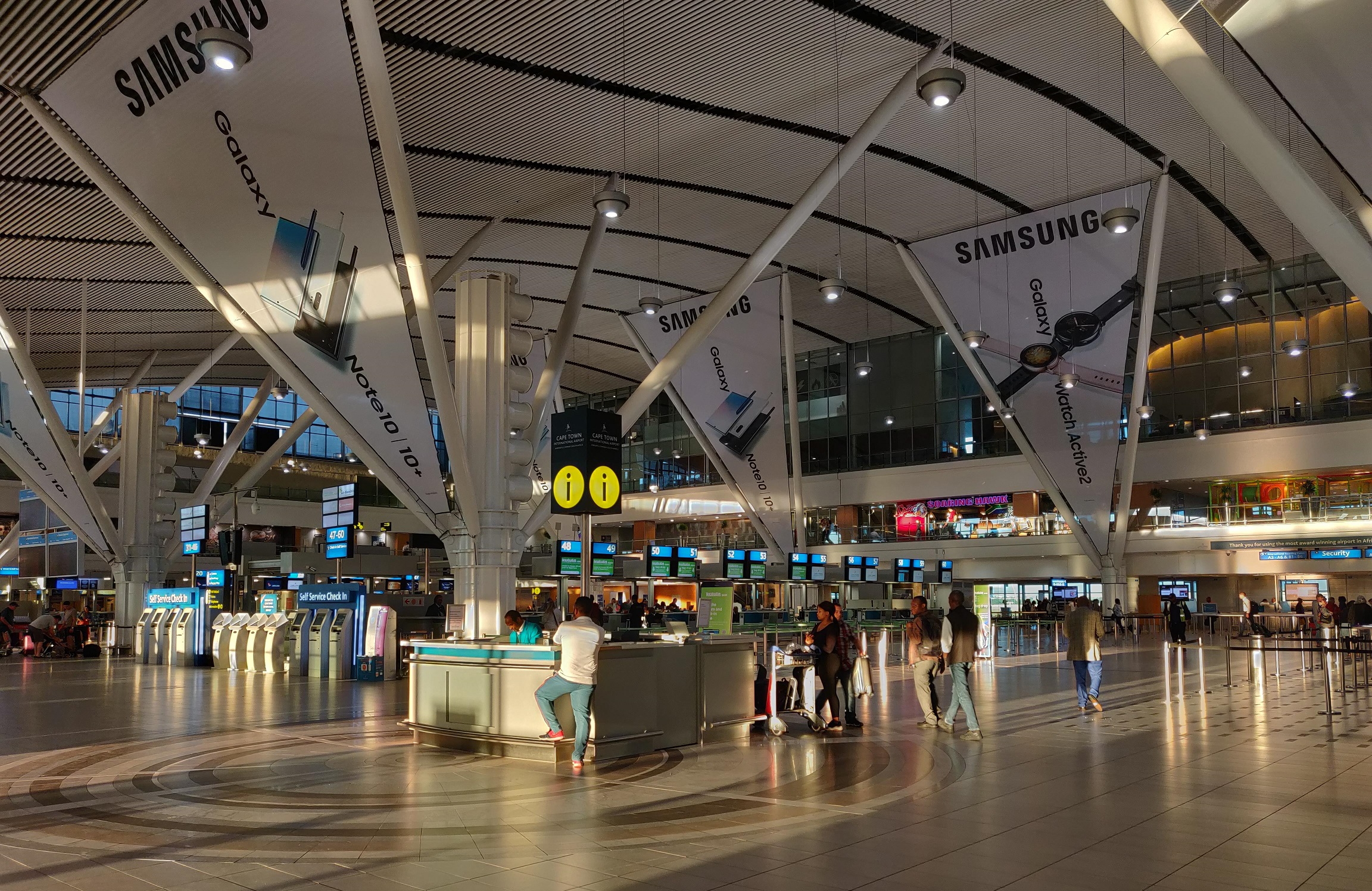
Local and international departures area on the upper floor of the Central Terminal.

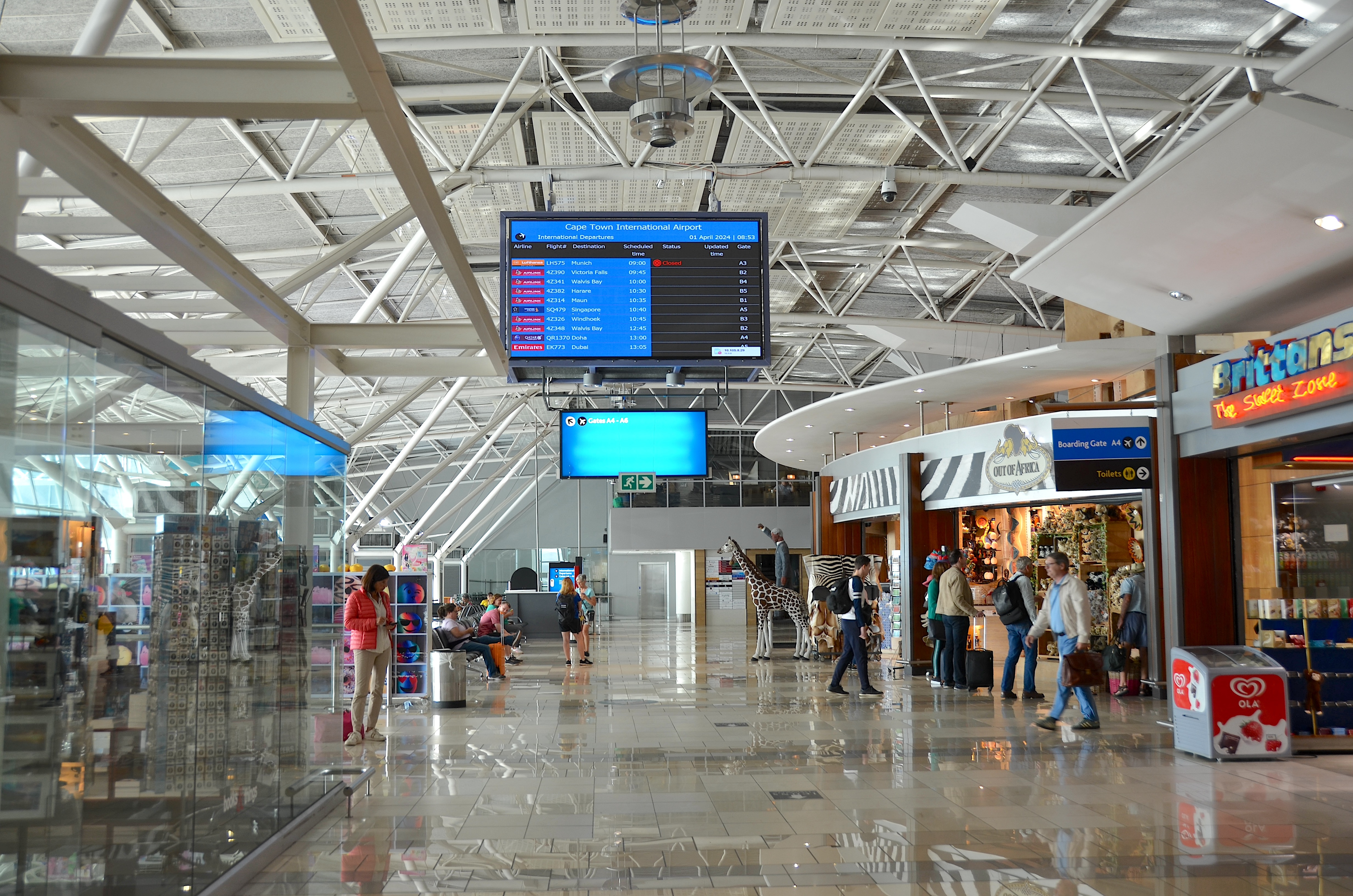
Interior of the international terminal

In preparation for the 2010 FIFA World Cup, Cape Town International Airport was extensively expanded and renovated. The main focus was the development of a Central Terminal Building at a cost of R1.6 billion, which linked the formerly separate domestic and international terminals and provided a common check-in area. The departures level of the Central Terminal opened in November 2009, with the entire building opened in April 2010.

Apart from the now-completed 2010 expansion project, it had been proposed that a second runway for large aircraft be constructed at the airport, to be completed by 2015. However, this second runway has not been constructed. In May 2015, Airports Company South Africa announced a R7.7 billion expansion for the airport. The expansion includes the upgrades of the Domestic & International terminals. The expansion has been postponed indefinitely due to the drop in passenger numbers due to the global COVID-19 pandemic from 2020.

=== 2027 developments ===
In February 2026, Airports Company South Africa (ACSA) announced a R10.14 billion upgrade project for Cape Town International. As part of the project, CTIA (which at the time was SA's fastest-growing airport) would receive upgrades in phases, over a number of years. Renovations would take place on the domestic and international terminals, starting in April 2027. Furthermore, a new, realigned main runway would be constructed, with contractor appointment for that part of the project planned for December 2026.

Other parts of the massive infrastructure project include additional domestic contact gates and airbridges, expanded apron capacity to support increased aircraft parking and improved aircraft movement flow, additional international apron stands, expanded commercial and lounge offerings, and improvements to immigration processing and bussing gates.

The project's goals were to enhance passenger processing capacity, improve circulation of passengers, and modernize the overall terminal environment in line with a projected growth in demand at CTIA. Its total cost represented over half of ACSA's then-current R21.7 billion overall capex budget for all of the airports it managed.

At the time of the announcement, Thabo Phateng, acting regional general manager of CTIA, said that the developments represented a significant step in strengthening Cape Town International Airport's role as a critical economic gateway for both the Western Cape and South Africa. He further stated that by expanding capacity and enhancing operational resilience, the airport is being positioned to support sustained passenger growth, tourism expansion, trade facilitation, and long term regional economic development.

== Facilities ==
=== Terminals ===
The airport has two terminals linked together by one central terminal.

==== Central Terminal ====
The terminal building has a split-level design, with departures located on the upper floors and arrivals in the lower floors; an elevated roadway system provides vehicular access to both departures and arrivals levels. All check-in takes place within the Central Terminal Building, which contains 120 check-in desks and 20 self-service kiosks.

Passengers then pass through a consolidated security screening area before dividing. Passengers flying internationally head to the northern part of the airport which is the international terminal, and passengers flying to other parts of South Africa head to the southern part of the airport to the domestic terminal.

The terminal has 10 air bridges, evenly split between domestic and international usage. Sections of lower levels of the domestic and international terminals are used for transporting passengers via bus to and from remotely parked aircraft.

Arriving passengers collect luggage in the old sections of their respective terminals, before proceeding through new passageways to the new Central Terminal Building. The terminal contains an automated baggage handling system, capable of handling 30,000 bags per hour.

Retail outlets are located on the lower (arrivals) level of the terminal at landside, as well as airside at the departure gates. Retail outlets are diverse, including foreign exchange services, bookstores, clothing retailers, grocery stores, souvenir outlets and duty-free in international departures.

Restaurants within the terminal building are located on the upper (3rd) level above the departures level, and include Ocean Basket, Mugg & Bean, Primi Cafe, Wimpy, and what is purported to be the largest Spur restaurant on the African continent, at 1,080 m^{2} (11,600 sq ft).

The restaurant level overlooks the airside of the terminal, where a glass curtain wall separates the patrons from the planes three stories below. On the 4th floor is where the airport's lounges are situated. The Bidvest, as well as South African Airways lounges, can be found there, as well as a Woolworths Food store.

==== International Terminal ====
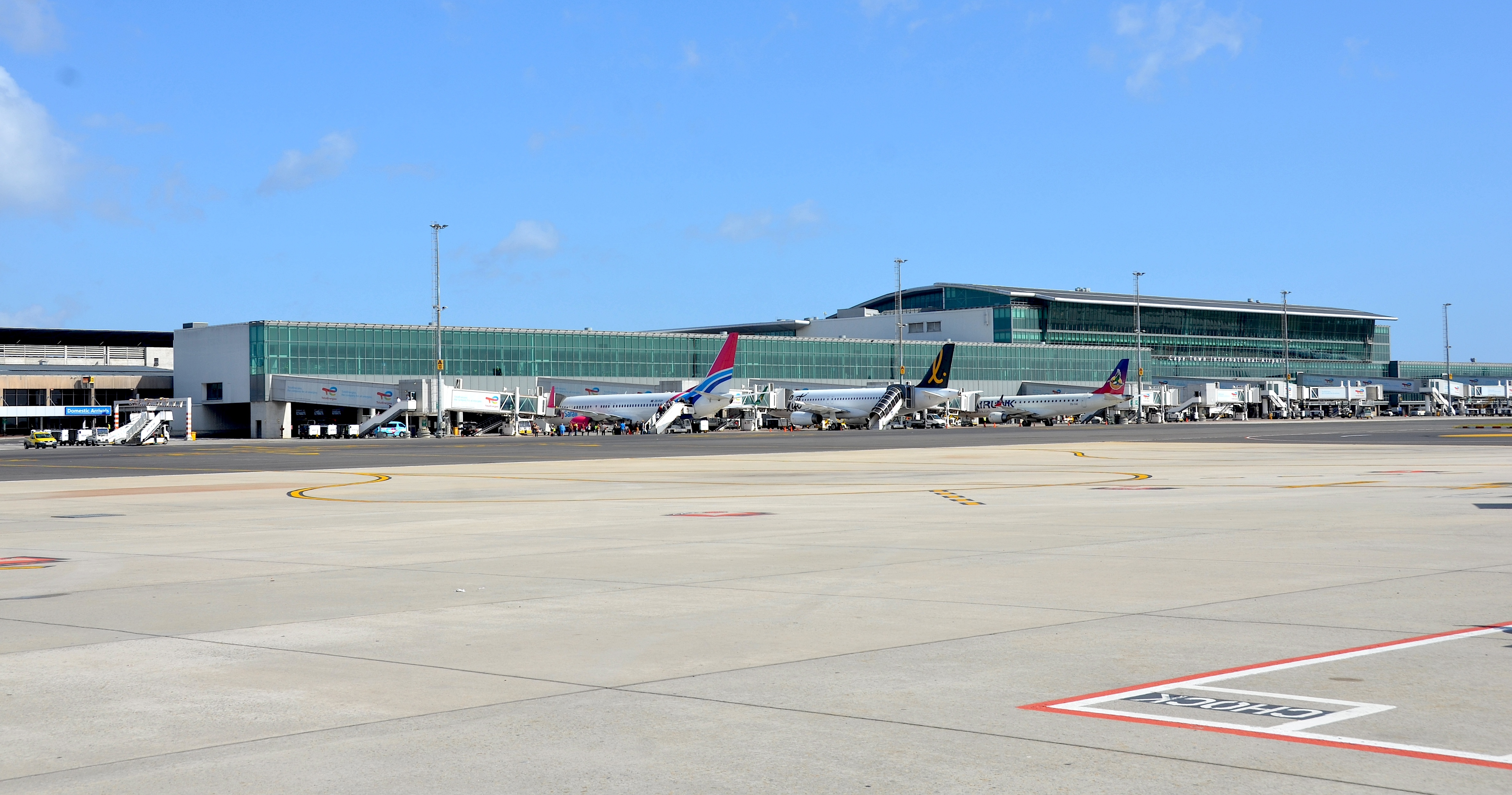
Terminals seen from apron

The international terminal is located on the northern side of the airport. Customs and Immigration facilities, lounges, duty-free shops, restaurants, prayer rooms, conference rooms, airline offices, and chapels are located in the terminal.

==== Domestic Terminal ====
Located on the southern side of the airport, it has the same facilities as the international terminal, with the exception of Immigration facilities.

=== Other facilities ===
There are two hotels located within the airport precinct: Hotel Verde, a four-star hotel owned by Bon Hotels and ranked as "Africa's greenest hotel", and the other being Road Lodge, a budget hotel owned by the City Lodge hotel chain group. An ExecuJet facility is located near the southern end of the main runway and caters for business jets.

== Airlines and destinations ==
During its peak tourist season, between November and March, Cape Town International maintains direct flights to 30 destinations across 35 routes, facilitated by 24 airlines and 228 flights per week.

=== Passenger ===
Airlines	Destinations
Air Botswana	Gaborone, Kasane, Maun
Air France	Seasonal: Paris–Charles de Gaulle
Air Mauritius	Mauritius
Airlink	Bloemfontein, Gaborone, George, Gqeberha, Harare, Hoedspruit, Johannesburg–O. R. Tambo, Kimberley, Maputo, Maun, Mauritius, Mbombela, Skukuza, Upington, Victoria Falls, Walvis Bay, Windhoek–Hosea Kutako, Zanzibar; Seasonal: Saint Helena
Air Tanzania	Dar es Salaam
British Airways	London–Heathrow
CemAir	Durban, East London, Hoedspruit, Johannesburg–O. R. Tambo, Kimberley, Plettenberg Bay; Seasonal: George
Condor	Seasonal: Frankfurt
Delta Air Lines	Atlanta^{a}
Edelweiss Air	Seasonal: Zürich
Emirates	Dubai–International
Eswatini Air	Manzini
Ethiopian Airlines	Addis Ababa
FlyNamibia	Walvis Bay, Windhoek–Hosea Kutako
FlySafair	Bloemfontein, Durban, East London, George, Gqeberha, Hoedspruit, Johannesburg–Lanseria, Johannesburg–O. R. Tambo, Mbombela, Windhoek–Hosea Kutako
Kenya Airways	Livingstone, Nairobi–Jomo Kenyatta^{b}, Victoria Falls
KLM	Amsterdam
LAM Mozambique Airlines	Maputo
LATAM Brasil	São Paulo–Guarulhos
LIFT	Durban, Johannesburg–O. R. Tambo
Lufthansa	Frankfurt; Seasonal: Munich
Norse Atlantic Airways	Seasonal: London–Gatwick
Proflight Zambia	Livingstone, Lusaka^{c}
Qantas	Seasonal: Sydney Kingsford-Smith (begins 19 October 2027)
Qatar Airways	Doha
Singapore Airlines	Singapore^{d}
South African Airways	Johannesburg–O. R. Tambo, São Paulo–Guarulhos, Mauritius
TAAG Angola Airlines	Luanda–Agostinho Neto
Turkish Airlines	Istanbul
United Airlines	Newark, Washington–Dulles
Virgin Atlantic	Seasonal: London–Heathrow

Notes

- ^a Some Delta Air Lines flights from Atlanta to Cape Town operate via Johannesburg. However, all flights from Cape Town to Atlanta are nonstop.
- ^b Kenya Airways flights to Nairobi operate via Victoria Falls OR Livingstone.
- ^c Lusaka flights operate via Livingstone on the same flight number.
- ^d This flight operates via Johannesburg. However, this carrier does not have rights to transport passengers solely between Cape Town and Johannesburg.

=== Cargo ===
Airlines	Destinations
BidAir Cargo	Johannesburg–Lanseria, Johannesburg–O. R. Tambo, Port Elizabeth

=== Destination Maps ===
==== South Africa ====
Destinations in South Africa from CPT.

==== International ====
Cape Town International Airport (Earth)
International destinations from CPT.
Year-round
Seasonal
Future

== Statistics ==
Annual passenger and aircraft statistics
Fiscal year (Apr–Mar)	Aircraft movements	Passenger traffic
2004–05	92,561	6,214,903
2005–06	88,890(▼4.0%)	6,834,173(▲10.0%)
2006–07	91,393(▲2.8%)	7,518,543(▲10.0%)
2007–08	102,285(▲11.9%)	8,426,618(▲12.1%)
2008–09	95,643(▼6.5%)	7,813,170(▼7.3%)
2009–10	92,579(▼3.2%)	7,810,069(▼0.0%)
2010–11	93,623(▲1.1%)	8,200,547(▲5.0%)
2011–12	97,995(▲4.7%)	8,576,338(▲4.6%)
2012–13	89,073(▼9.1%)	8,434,799(▼1.7%)
2013–14	88,573(▼0.6%)	8,392,989(▼0.5%)
2014–15	91,146(▲2.9%)	8,755,872(▲4.3%)
2015–16	100,221(▲10.0%)	9,659,589(▲10.3%)
2016–17	99,337(▼0.9%)	10,211,390(▲5.7%)
2017–18	103,001(▲3.7%)	10,752,246(▲5.3%)
2018–19	98,666(▼4.2%)	10,823,737(▲0.1%)
2019–20	90,179(▼8.6%)	10,688,798(▼1.2%)
2020–21	38,918(▼56.8%)	2,386,121(▼77.7%)
2021–22	67,696(▲73.9%)	5,700,811(▲82%)
2022–23	90,280(▲33.4%)	8,407,751(▲47.0%)
2023–24	99,138(▲9.8%)	10,034,352(▲17.6%)
2024–25	101,305(▲2.2%)	10,494,994(▲4.6%)
2025–26	98,723(▼2.5%)	11,333,736(▲8.0%)
Source: ACSA

== Ground transport ==
=== Car ===
Cape Town International Airport is approximately 20 kilometres (12 mi) from the city centre and is accessible from the N2 freeway, with Airport Approach Road providing a direct link between the N2 (at exit 16) and the airport. The airport can also be indirectly accessed from the R300 freeway via the M12, M10 and M22.

The airport provides approximately 1,424 parking spaces in the general parking area, and 1,748 parking bays in the multi-storey car park located near the domestic terminal. A new car park opened in 2010, which is located near the international terminal and provides an additional 4,000 parking spaces. The airport also offers a valet parking service.

=== Public transport ===
Transport to and from the airport is provided by metered taxis, e-hailing services (such as Uber and Bolt), and various private shuttle companies. The airport features a dedicated "drop & go" area for taxis and carpooling. A taxi journey to the CBD takes about 18 minutes.

=== Rail link ===
There is no direct rail access to Cape Town International Airport. In 2013, the Passenger Rail Agency of South Africa (PRASA) proposed a 4 km (2.5 mi) rail link between the airport and Cape Town's existing suburban rail network, however this has not yet been developed.

== Accolades ==
In 2025, Cape Town International was ranked as the best airport in the world in the AirHelp Score list, shifting from its 2024 rank of second-best. Based on visitor opinions, the airport performed particularly well in the categories of on-time performance and customer experience.

In the same year, CTIA was ranked the Best Airport in Africa, Best Airport Staff Service in Africa, and Cleanest Airport in Africa, in the 2025 Skytrax World Airport Awards. The award is based on Skytrax's customer satisfaction study, across 575 airports in 100 countries.

In 2026, CTIA was named Africa's Best Airport for the 11th consecutive year, at the annual Skytrax World Airport Awards.

== Accidents and incidents ==
- On 7 November 2007, Nationwide Airlines Flight 723, a Boeing 737-200, had its right hand engine detach from the airframe during rotation. The pilots declared an emergency and safely landed at the airport saving all 112 occupants onboard without injury.

== See also ==
- List of airports in South Africa
- List of South African airports by passenger movements
