= Hendrik Van Eck Airport =

Phalaborwa Airport Phalaborwa Airport
- IATA: PHW; ICAO: FAPH

Summary
- Airport type: Public
- Serves: Phalaborwa, Mopani District Municipality, South Africa
- Elevation AMSL: 1,432 ft (436 m)
- Coordinates: 23°56.2′S 031°09.3′E

Map
- Location in Limpopo

Runways
Direction	Length		Surface
Direction	m	ft	Surface
01/19	1,373	4,505	Asphalt
- Sources: South African AIP, DAFIF

Phalaborwa Airport (IATA: PHW, ICAO: FAPH) is an airport serving Phalaborwa, a town in the Limpopo province of South Africa. It was previously known as Hendrik van Eck Airport, named after the South African engineer and industrialist who died in 1970. The airport borders the Kruger National Park.

== Facilities ==
The airport resides at an elevation of 1,432 feet (436 m) above mean sea level. It has one runway designated 01/19 with an asphalt surface measuring 1,373 by 18 metres (4,505 ft × 59 ft).

== Airlines and destinations ==
Airlink ceased flights to and from Phalaborwa Airport on 10 June 2020. As such, the airport no longer serves any commercial flights. Only charter flights are operated into and out of the airport.
