= Nelspruit Airport =

- IATA: NLP; ICAO: FANS

Summary
- Airport type: Public
- Owner: Mbombela Local Municipality
- Serves: Mbombela, South Africa
- Location: south west of Mbombela
- Elevation AMSL: 2,901 ft / 884 m
- Coordinates: 25°30′04″S 30°54′47″E

Maps

Runways
Direction	Length		Surface
Direction	ft	m	Surface
04/22	3,419 x 59	1,042 x 18	narrow paved strip
- Source: SkyVector

Nelspruit Airport, South Africa is located about 9 km (6 mi) south west of the city of Mbombela. It was the city's original and only airport serving the region until the opening of Kruger Mpumalanga International Airport in 2002.

The airport is owned and operated by the Mbombela Local Municipality. As of 2018 it now serves mostly general aviation. There are over a hundred aircraft based at the airport. The majority of the aircraft are privately owned but there are several commercial aircraft based here as well.

There are several Authorised Maintenance Organisations (AMO), fire fighting, charter & training companies based at the airport. The airport is limited in its potential operations by its runway length of 875 m (2870 ft). The topography of the area prohibits expansion.

Among the airlines flying to Nelspruit Airport are Airlink and FlySafair.
