= King Phalo Airport =

King Phalo Airport Koning Phalo Lughawe
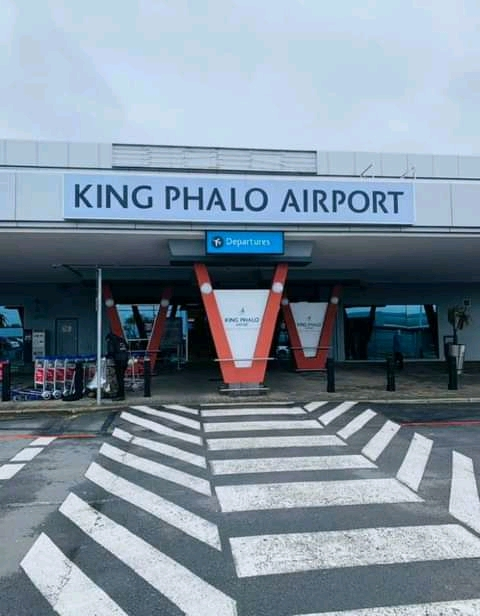
- IATA: ELS; ICAO: FAEL

Summary
- Airport type: Public
- Operator: Airports Company South Africa
- Serves: East London, South Africa
- Opened: 1944; 82 years ago
- Elevation AMSL: 436 ft (133 m)
- Coordinates: 33°02′06″S 027°49′17″E
- Website: www.airports.co.za/airports/King-Phalo-airport

Maps
- Interactive Map
- Location in the Eastern Cape ELS (South Africa) ELS (Africa)

Runways
| Direction | Length | | Surface |
| Direction | m | ft | Surface |
|---|---|---|---|
| 11/29 | 1,939 | 6,362 | Asphalt |
| 06/24 | 1,585 | 5,200 | Asphalt |

Statistics (FY 2025–26)
- Passenger traffic: 911,738
- Aircraft movements: 12,778
- Sources: ACSA, South African AIP, DAFIF

King Phalo Airport (IATA: ELS, ICAO: FAEL) (Afrikaans: Koning Phalo Lughawe; formerly East London Airport (Afrikaans: Oos-Londen Lughawe) until 23 February 2021) is an airport serving East London, a city in the Eastern Cape province on the southeast coast of South Africa.

The airport handles between 20 and 30 flights daily. In 2016, King Phalo Airport was voted the fastest growing airport in South Africa, having accomplished an almost 19% increase in traffic over a 12-month-period.

== History ==
The airport had an inauspicious beginning in 1927, when Lieut Colonel Alistair Miller asked the East London town council to help establish a municipal aerodrome at Woodbrook, west of the city.

Passenger flights were undertaken by two de Havilland Moth planes on Saturday afternoons and all day on Sundays, weather permitting. Flights could also be booked for weekdays, but only by special arrangement. In 1931, it took 11 hours to fly from Windhoek in Namibia to King Phalo Airport.

In 1944 a new airport was built at Collondale, about 2 km west of the present terminal building.

In 1965 the airport was again moved, this time to its present site - 9 km west of the city centre. Construction of the terminal buildings finished in 1966, and the airport was named after Ben Schoeman - the minister of transport at the time.

The airport was renamed in 1994 to East London Airport. Since then, major alterations to the terminal building have been completed and a new first-floor office development for the airport management team has been added. On 23 February 2021, the airport was renamed to King Phalo Airport.

In 2024, there were frequent disruptions to this and other regional airports caused by failings at Air Traffic Navigation Services (ATNS).

== Infrastructure ==
=== Runways ===
King Phalo Airport has two asphalt runways: 11/29 is 1,939 by 46 meters and 06/24 is 1,585 by 46 meters.

== Facilities ==
King Phalo Airport is at an elevation of 435 feet (133 m) above mean sea level. It has two asphalt paved runways: 11/29 is 1,939 by 46 metres (6,362 ft × 151 ft) and 06/24 is 1,585 by 46 metres (5,200 ft × 151 ft).

== Airlines and destinations ==
=== Passenger ===
| Airlines | Destinations |
|---|---|
| Airlink | Johannesburg–O. R. Tambo |
| CemAir | Johannesburg–O. R. Tambo, Cape Town |
| FlySafair | Cape Town, Durban, Johannesburg–Lanseria, Johannesburg–O. R. Tambo |

King Phalo Airport (South Africa)
Destinations from ELS.

=== Cargo ===
BidAir Cargo transports cargo between King Phalo Airport and O. R. Tambo International Airport at Johannesburg.

== Traffic statistics ==
Annual passenger and aircraft statistics
| Fiscal year (Apr–Mar) | Aircraft movements | Passenger traffic |
|---|---|---|
| 2007–08 | no data | 741,290 |
| 2008–09 | no data | 699,070(▼5.7%) |
| 2009–10 | 35,765 | 676,982(▼3.2%) |
| 2010–11 | 38,777(▲8.4%) | 677,370(▲0.1%) |
| 2011–12 | 32,587(▼16.0%) | 681,529(▲0.6%) |
| 2012–13 | 30,501(▼6.4%) | 644,520(▼5.4%) |
| 2013–14 | 31,165(▲2.2%) | 664,684(▲3.1%) |
| 2014–15 | 31,798(▲2.0%) | 638,012(▼4.0%) |
| 2015–16 | 30,007(▼5.6%) | 726,049(▲13.8%) |
| 2016–17 | 30,043(▲0.1%) | 793,832(▲9.3%) |
| 2017–18 | 27,046(▼10.0%) | 816,154(▲2.8%) |
| 2018–19 | 24,892(▼8.0%) | 840,225(▲2.9%) |
| 2019–20 | 26,453(▲6.3%) | 916,192(▲9.0%) |
| 2020–21 | 9,276(▼64.9%) | 315,792(▼65.5%) |
| 2021–22 | 18,616(▲100.7%) | 643,437(▲103.8%) |
| 2022–23 | 17,696(▼4.9%) | 714,598(▲11.1%) |
| 2023–24 | 17,030(▼3.8%) | 832,251(▲16.5%) |
| 2024–25 | 13,785(▼19.1%) | 830,442(▼0.2%) |
| 2025–26 | 12,778(▼7.3%) | 911,738(▲9.8%) |
Source: ACSA

== Incidents ==
- On 13 March 1967, South African Airways Flight 406 crashed into the Indian Ocean while on approach to King Phalo Airport. All 25 passengers and crew on board were killed.

== See also ==
- List of airports in South Africa
- List of South African airports by passenger movements
