= Chief Dawid Stuurman International Airport =

International airport in South Africa

Chief Dawid Stuurman International Airport Hoofman Dawid Stuurman Internasionale Lughawe
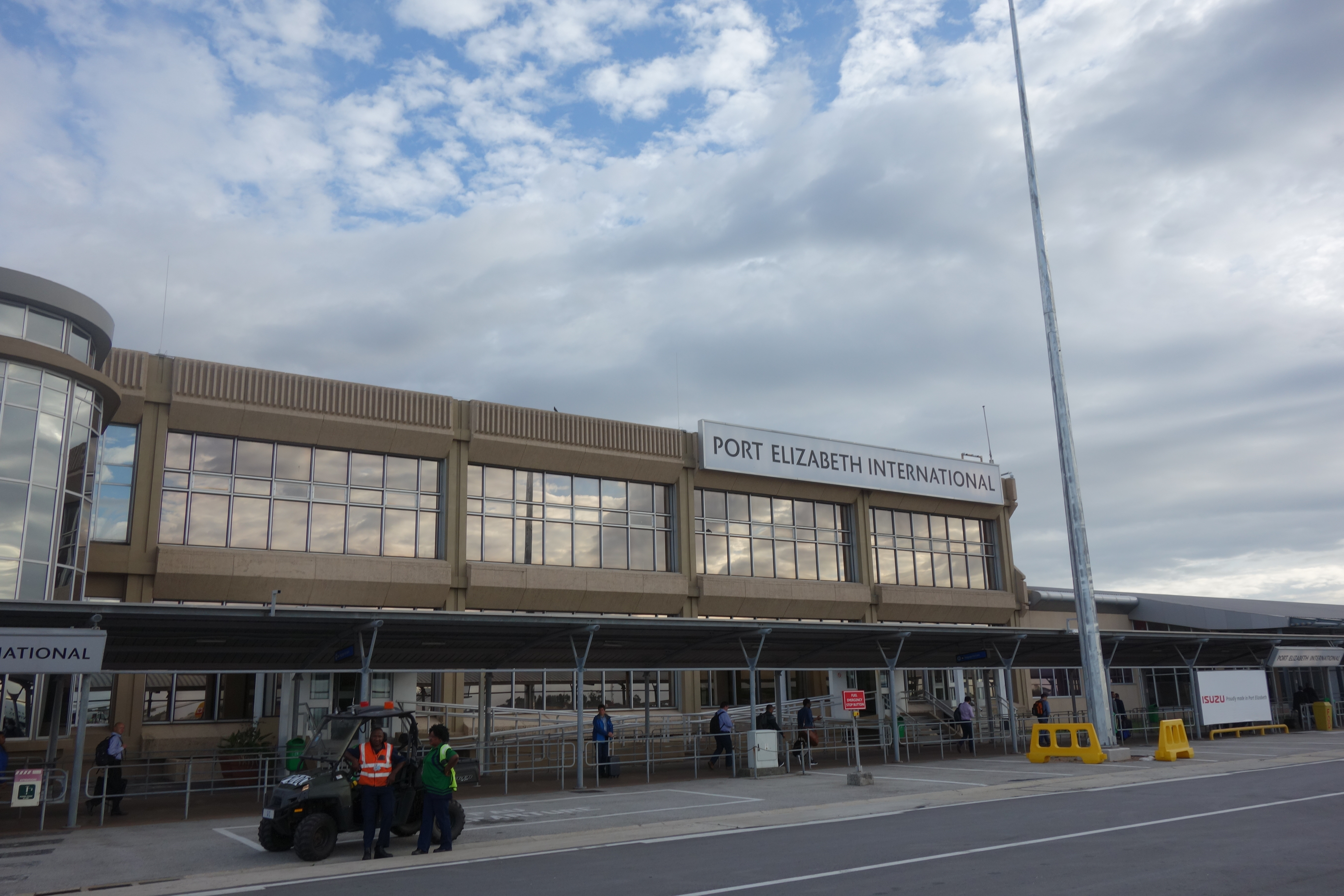
- IATA: PLZ; ICAO: FAPE

Summary
- Airport type: Public
- Owner/Operator: Airports Company South Africa
- Serves: Gqeberha, South Africa
- Location: Walmer, Gqeberha, Eastern Cape, South Africa
- Opened: 1929
- Hub for: FlySafair; South African Airways
- Elevation AMSL: 229 ft (70 m)
- Coordinates: 33°59′05″S 025°36′37″E
- Website: acsa.co.za

Maps
- Interactive Map
- Location of the airport FAPE (South Africa) FAPE (Africa)

Runways
Direction	Length		Surface
Direction	m	ft	Surface
08/26	2,160	7,087	Asphalt
17/35	1,677	5,502	Asphalt

Statistics (FY 2025–26)
- Passenger traffic: 1,586,070
- Aircraft movements: 43,653
- Source: ACSA, South African AIP

Chief Dawid Stuurman International Airport (IATA: PLZ, ICAO: FAPE) is an airport serving Gqeberha (Port Elizabeth), a city in the Eastern Cape province in South Africa. It was formerly known as H. F. Verwoerd Airport and Port Elizabeth International Airport. The airport is located approximately two miles south of the city's central business district.

In February 2021, the airport was changed from Port Elizabeth International Airport to Chief Dawid Stuurman International Airport.

== History ==
A historical highlight was the first flight from Cape Town to Port Elizabeth in 1917, made by Major Allister Mackintosh Miller. At that time, this was considered a long-distance flight, and it heralded the start of the civil aviation industry in Port Elizabeth. This flight and many more has been captured on canvas by Ron Belling and is on display at the Ron Belling Art Gallery.

Port Elizabeth Airport was established in 1929 in close proximity to the city. It was initially founded by Lieutenant Colonel Miller, who needed an airfield to operate his postal service between the city and Cape Town. It was only officially opened some nine years later, in 1936, boasting a single runway, one hangar and a concrete apron. However, the foundations of this infrastructure will be removed to make room for additional vehicle parking.

During World War II, the airfield was extended to accommodate 42 Air School of the Royal Air Force as part of the British Commonwealth Air Training Plan and 6 Squadron South African Air Force on the southern and eastern sides of the field. Commercial operations were conducted from the northern side. In 1954, it saw the landing of the first jet-propelled aircraft - five De Havilland Vampire FB9s.

Construction of the permanent terminal buildings, runways and an air traffic control building began in 1950. The commercial operation was moved to an airfield at St Albans, some 25 km from the city centre, for the construction period. The new buildings were officially opened in 1955. In 1973 the apron was extended to accommodate larger aircraft and a new departures terminal was opened in 1980.

These facilities served the community till 2000 when plans for a major terminal upgrade was drawn-up. The separate arrivals and departures buildings were consolidated into a single facility with a central retail area linking the departures with arrivals creating a light friendly atmosphere. This facility caters for domestic flights but can be screened off to operate a fully compliant International arrivals and departures section.

The airport's name change from Port Elizabeth International Airport to Chief Dawid Stuurman International Airport was officially gazetted on 23 February 2021.

== Facilities ==
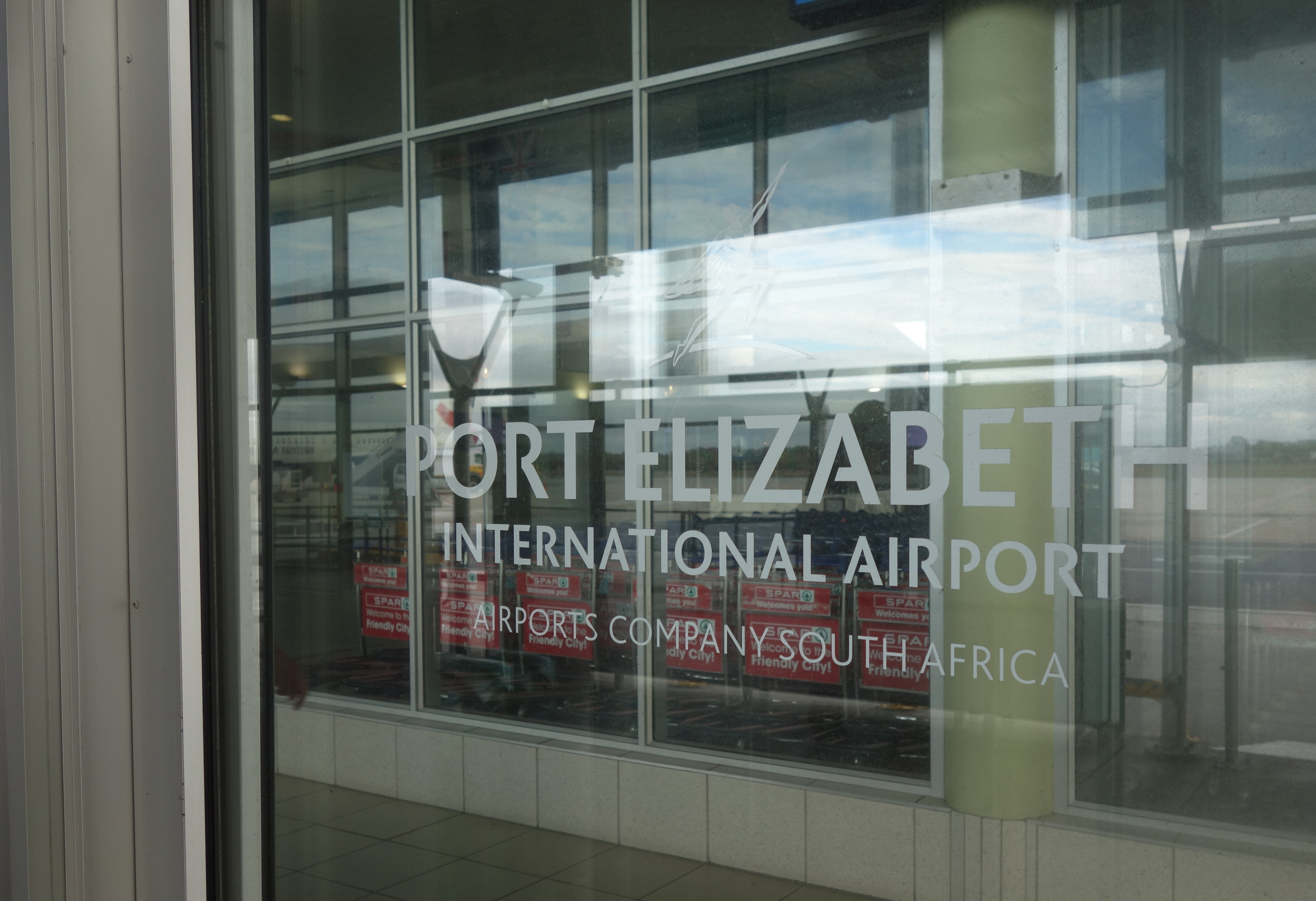
Entrance

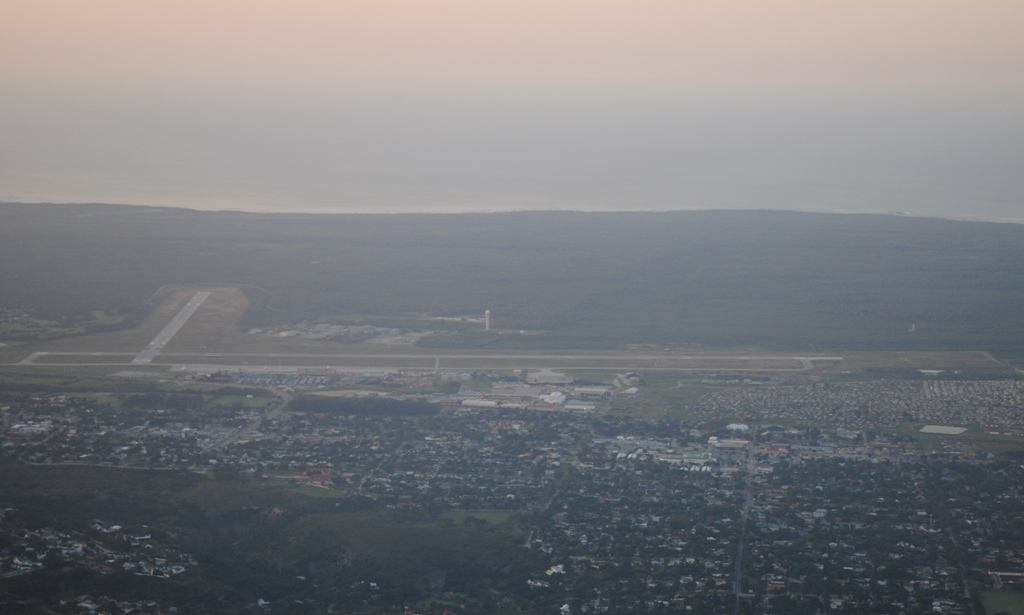
Aerial view of Chief Dawid Stuurman International Airport

The airport resides at an elevation of 226 feet (69 m) above mean sea level. It has two asphalt paved runways: 08/26 is 1,980 by 46 metres (6,496 ft × 151 ft) and 17/35 is 1,677 by 46 metres (5,502 ft × 151 ft). There are also 13 aircraft parking bays on the apron and the terminal building measures 8,700 square metres (94,000 sq ft). The modern terminal upgrade was completed in June 2004 allowing the airport to handle up to 2 million passengers a year. In preparation for the 2010 FIFA World Cup runway 08/26 was going to be extended from 1,980m to 3,000m with a view to accommodating International flights, although this never happened. A number of hotels are present on or near the airport. Ground transport is provided by local taxis. The airport also has a selection of parking areas and several car rental offices, including Eurocar and Bidvest.

=== South African Air Force ===
Air Force Station Port Elizabeth is home to C Flight of 15 Squadron of the South African Air Force. It is a helicopter unit primarily tasked with maritime and landward search and rescue. There is also a branch of the South African Air Force Museum at the airport. The museum houses many historical military jets, helicopters, exhibits and paintings dating from the airport's days a World War II base to the end of apartheid.

== Airlines and destinations ==
=== Passenger ===
Airlines	Destinations
Airlink	Cape Town, Durban, Johannesburg–O. R. Tambo
CemAir	Durban, Johannesburg–O. R. Tambo
FlySafair	Cape Town, Durban, Johannesburg–Lanseria, Johannesburg–O. R. Tambo
South African Airways	Johannesburg–O. R. Tambo

Destinations Map

=== Cargo ===
BidAir Cargo transports cargo between Dawid Stuurman Airport and O. R. Tambo International Airport at Johannesburg.

== Traffic statistics ==
Annual passenger and aircraft statistics
Fiscal year (Apr–Mar)	Aircraft movements	Passenger traffic
2007–08	no data	1,512,924
2008–09	no data	1,408,375(▼6.9%)
2009–10	77,262	1,349,673(▼4.2%)
2010–11	71,206(▼7.8%)	1,413,183(▲4.7%)
2011–12	68,893(▼3.2%)	1,364,976(▼3.4%)
2012–13	62,911(▼8.7%)	1,311,553(▼3.9%)
2013–14	67,350(▲7.1%)	1,251,178(▼4.6%)
2014–15	62,594(▼7.1%)	1,350,744(▲8.0%)
2015–16	64,328(▲2.8%)	1,604,381(▲18.8%)
2016–17	62,930(▼2.2%)	1,582,493(▼1.4%)
2017–18	53,282(▼15.3%)	1,641,393(▲3.7%)
2018–19	22,916(▼57.0%)	1,689,808(▲3.0%)
2019–20	47,318(▲106.5%)	1,689,914(▲0.0%)
2020–21	29,710(▼37.2%)	425,364(▼74.8%)
2021–22	43,210(▲45.5%)	904,396(▲112.6%)
2022–23	39,002(▼9.7%)	1,191,225(▲31.7%)
2023–24	39,222(▲0.6%)	1,427,483(▲19.8%)
2024–25	43,708(▲11.4%)	1,519,612(▲6.5%)
2025–26	43,653(▼0.1%)	1,586,070(▲4.4%)
Source: ACSA

== See also ==
- List of airports in South Africa
- List of South African airports by passenger movements
- South African Air Force Museum
