= Air Force Base Hoedspruit =

Air Force Base Hoedspruit / Eastgate Airport
- IATA: HDS; ICAO: FAHS

Summary
- Airport type: Military and civil
- Owner: Department of Defence
- Operator: South African Air Force
- Location: Hoedspruit, Limpopo, South Africa
- Elevation AMSL: 531 m (1,742 ft)
- Coordinates: 24°21′17″S 31°03′01″E
- Website: www.eastgateairport.co.za

Map
- Location in Limpopo

Runways
Direction	Length		Surface
Direction	m	ft	Surface
09/27	2,115	6,939	Asphalt
18/36	3,991	13,094	Asphalt

Statistics (2008-2009)
- Passengers: 57 000
- Sources: WAD, GCM, STV

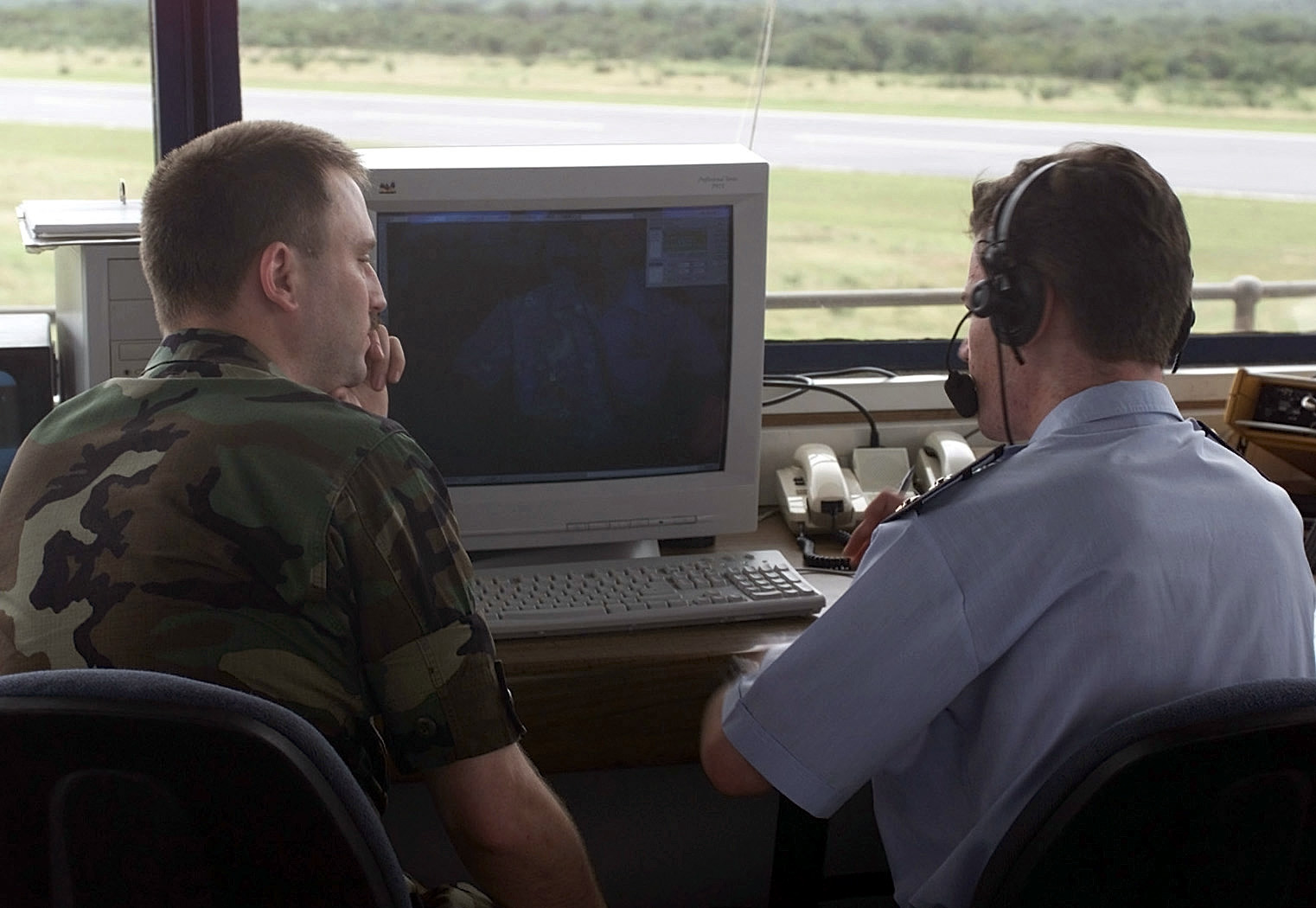
Hoedspruit Air Force Base, South Africa

Air Force Base Hoedspruit (IATA: HDS, ICAO: FAHS) is an airbase of the South African Air Force. It is located adjacent to the Kruger National Park. In the late 1990s an unused portion of the base was converted into a civilian airport known as Eastgate Airport. It was also an emergency landing site for the Space Shuttle.

== Units hosted ==
- 19 Squadron - Helicopter squadron
- 101 Squadron - Light transport (reserve)
- 514 Squadron - Security services
- 7 Aircraft Servicing Unit - Maintenance support
- Lowveld Airspace Control Sector - Airspace control
- Air Force Command and Control School - Training

== History ==
The base was officially opened on 1 July 1978. It was designed from the start to be a highly protected wartime base. As such, it has armoured and Hardened Aircraft Shelters, with revetments placed close to the runways for aircraft on immediate take-off standby duty.

The base is teeming with wildlife, being surrounded by the 25 km^{2} AFB Hoedspruit Game Reserve. Keeping the runway clear of animals was a massive problem. This led the base to introduce three cheetahs on the airfield, with the end result that animal incursions onto the runway have decreased by 90%. Another SAAF base, AFB Makhado, has since also adopted this concept.

The base gained international media attention in 2000, when it hosted the United States Air Force's rescue contingent as part of Operation Atlas Response, the mission to provide rescue and humanitarian support to areas of Mozambique devastated by the severe flooding caused by Cyclone Eline.

The base motto is Pro Nostrorum Pace (Peace for our People).

== Eastgate Airport ==
A civil airport terminal, known as the Eastgate Airport, was established at the southern end of the airfield in the early 1990s. The terminal's main business is serving tourists visiting private game reserves in the area as well as access to the Kruger National Park via the nearby Orpen Gate. Facilities at the terminal include car hire and foreign exchange.

Charter flights are offered by Federal Air, Genair, Cesszani, Execujet, SA Historical Flight and Bataleur.

== Airlines and destinations ==
Airlines	Destinations
Airlink	Cape Town, Johannesburg–O.R. Tambo
CemAir	Cape Town, Johannesburg–O.R. Tambo, George
FlySafair	Cape Town
