= Richards Bay Airport =

Richards Bay Airport Richardsbaai Lughawe
- IATA: RCB; ICAO: FARB

Summary
- Airport type: Public
- Owner: uMhlathuze Local Municipality
- Location: Richards Bay, South Africa
- Elevation AMSL: 33 m / 109 ft
- Coordinates: 28°44′27″S 32°05′31″E

Map
- Location of Airport in KwaZulu-Natal RCB (South Africa) RCB (Africa)

Runways
Direction	Length		Surface
Direction	m	ft	Surface
05/23	1,300	4,265	Asphalt

Richards Bay Airport (IATA: RCB, ICAO: FARB) is an airport in Richards Bay, South Africa.

== Overview ==
It is independently managed and not part of the network of larger airports operated by the parastatal Airports Company South Africa (ACSA). The Airport is managed by Indiza Airport Management. The Airport is also home to one of the only aviation maintenance companies in the Northern KwaZulu-Natal, Alton Aero Engineering. South African Airlink used to fly the only scheduled flight service in and out of Richards Bay, using a fleet of Embraer E170 jet and BAe Jetstream 41 aircraft.

In late 2011, after much speculation, it was confirmed that the airport would undergo a major upgrade that would render the airport's status as International. The expansion project however, has been put on hold pending an outcome to the issue of the local township of Mandlanzini, with residents having settled in the path of the intended runway extension.

== Airlines and destinations ==
Airlines	Destinations
Airlink	Johannesburg–O. R. Tambo

== Traffic statistics ==
Annual passenger statistics
Year	Passengers	% Change
2011	83,069	▼10.2%
2012	80,978	▼2.5%
2013	77,401	▼4.4%
2014	80,205	▲3.6%
