= Hoedspruit =

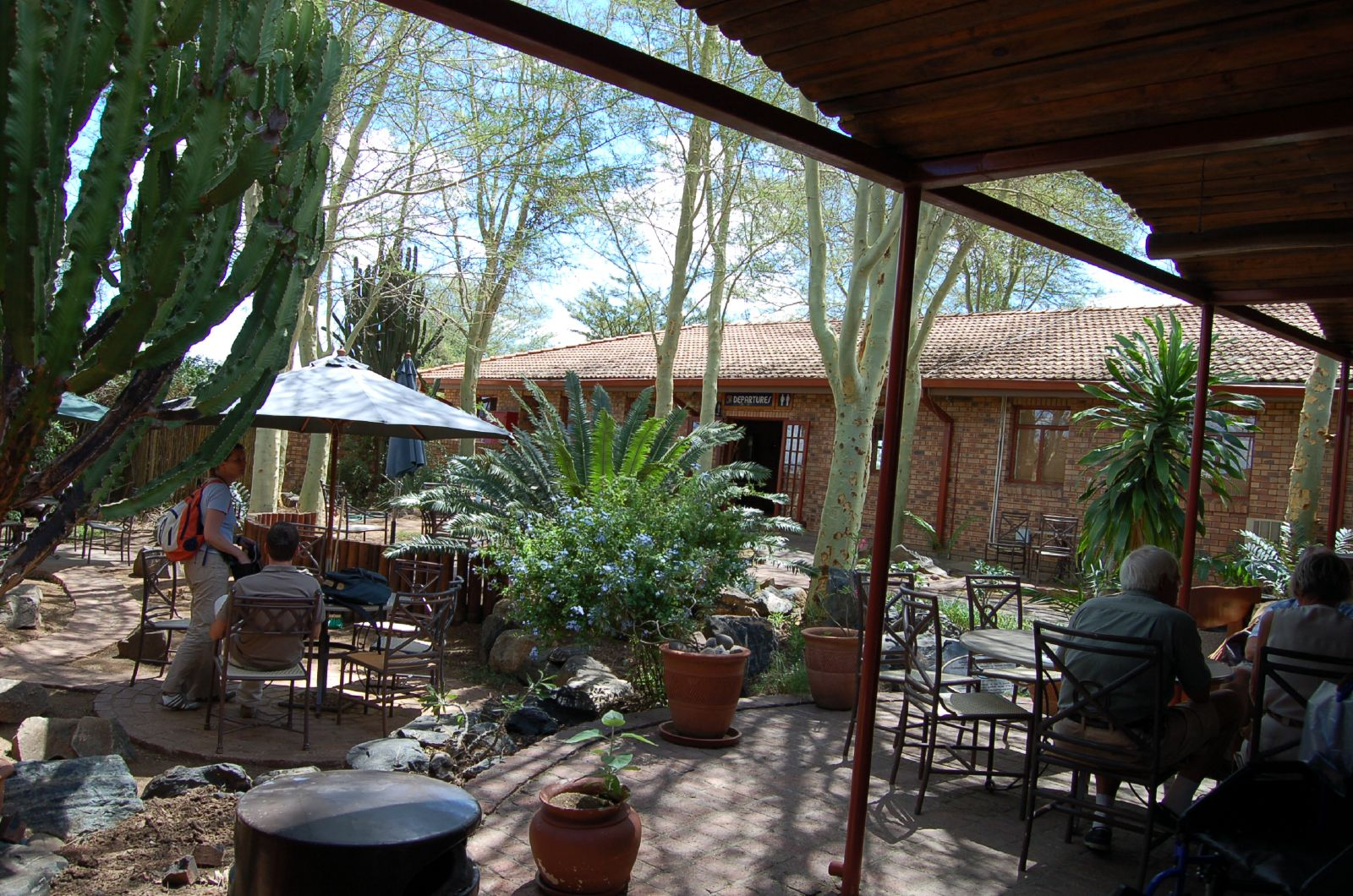
- Courtyard at Hoedspruit Airport

- Location within Limpopo Location within South Africa
- Coordinates: 24°21′S 30°58′E
- Country: South Africa
- Province: Limpopo
- District: Mopani
- Municipality: Maruleng

Area
  - Total: 24.13 km^{2} (9.32 sq mi)

Population (2011)
  - Total: 3,157
  - Density: 130.8/km^{2} (338.9/sq mi)

Racial makeup (2011)
  - Black African: 39.4%
  - Coloured: 5.0%
  - Indian/Asian: 2.8%
  - White: 52.3%
  - Other: 0.5%

First languages (2011)
  - Afrikaans: 44.8%
  - English: 19.7%
  - Northern Sotho: 11.7%
  - Tsonga: 6.2%
  - Other: 17.6%
- Time zone: UTC+2 (SAST)
- Postal code (street): 1380
- PO box: 1380
- Area code: 015

Hoedspruit (Afrikaans for Hat Creek) is a town in the Limpopo province of South Africa, situated at the foot of the Klein Drakensberg (Afrikaans for "Small Dragon Mountains"). The town is located on the Selati railway line, which connects Phalaborwa to Kaapmuiden.

== Geography and Geology ==
Hoedspruit is located at the foot of the Klein Drakensberg, a mountain range that forms part of the larger Drakensberg escarpment. One of the highest peaks in this part of the range is Mariepskop, which stands at 1,947 metres above sea level. The mountains in this area are composed of Proterozoic sedimentary rocks, including quartzite, shale, and dolomite, belonging to the Transvaal Supergroup. This erosion-resistant quartzite layer, which is over 2 billion years old, also forms the Magaliesberg mountains near Pretoria.

== History ==
=== Pre-colonial history ===
Stone Age artifacts and sites from all three periods suggest continuous occupation by early humans. Several Iron Age sites have been identified in the region. An Early Iron Age site, excavated on the Happyland farm, dates from between AD 450 and 1000 and has provided insights into early agriculture and cultural practices. Another significant discovery was made on what is now the Zandspruit Aero Estate, where archaeologists Anton Pelser and Anton van Vollenhoven found a site estimated to date to around 800 AD. They identified it as part of a pre-existing network of trade routes.

=== Colonial settlement ===
Dawid Johannes Joubert became the first owner of the Hoedspruit farm, acquiring the land in 1844 and settling in the region between the Blyde and present-day Zandspruit rivers. On 5 May 1848, Joubert officially registered the farm at the land office in Ohrigstad, which gave the farm its first official registration and name.

In the 1850s, Ohrigstad became the central town of the area, but only older settlers were permitted to live in and around Ohrigstad itself. Younger settlers under the age of 45 were encouraged to move farther away. Consequently, a group of young men established a settlement between the mountains and the Blyde River on a farm they named Jonkmanspruit (meaning "young man's stream"). Other young men settled on nearby farms such as Welverdiend (meaning "well deserved") and Driehoek (meaning "triangle," due to the farm's shape). These farm names are still in use in the area around the original Hoedspruit farm.

The name "Hoedspruit" reportedly originates from an incident in 1844 involving Dawid Johannes Joubert. After a severe cloudburst caused the local river (now the Zandspruit) to flood, Joubert lost his hat in the water. He subsequently named the river "Hoedspruit," meaning "Hat Stream," to commemorate the event, and the farm later took the same name.

Dawid Johannes Joubert owned another farm in the Ohrigstad area and divided his time between both properties. In 1860, he was killed by a leopard while on his farm in Ohrigstad.

During Joubert's ownership, the Hoedspruit farm he had registered was extensive, stretching from the Blyde River to the Klaserie River and encompassing the present-day town center.

Around this time, a border dispute arose between the Portuguese in Lourenço Marques (now Maputo) and the Transvaal Republic over the international boundary near the Drakensberg mountain range. The Portuguese claimed the Drakensberg as the border between Mozambique and South Africa, while the South Africans argued it was the Lebombo Mountains. To settle the matter, President Paul Kruger of the Transvaal Republic ordered a land survey to determine the official border.

As there were no qualified land surveyors in South Africa at the time, three surveyors—including G.R. von Wielligh, Vos, and Gillfillan—were brought from Europe. While in the Transvaal Republic, President Kruger also instructed them to mark farm boundaries along the Drakensberg mountains before their return to Europe, as the region was attracting potential settlers. The large farms, including the original Hoedspruit farm, were subdivided into smaller registered farms.

Lacking knowledge of local languages and customs, the European surveyors often gave the new farms European place names. As a result, many farms in the area are named after places such as Essex, Madrid, Berlin, Richmond, Chester, Moscow, Dublin, Dundee, and Fife.

== Transport ==
=== Rail ===
Hoedspruit is situated on the historic Selati Railway line, which played a significant role in the region's development. Construction began in 1892, with earthworks reaching the Sabi River by mid-1893. The railway served as a strategic supply route during both wartime and peacetime and contributed to local socio-economic growth.

== Economy ==
Tourism and agriculture are the cornerstones of the local economy. Due to its proximity to private game reserves and the Kruger National Park, ecotourism and big game hunting are major contributors to the economy. The region is a major agricultural producer, and according to the Maruleng Local Municipality, it is a leading producer and exporter of mangoes and one of the largest producers of citrus. Other agricultural products include macadamia nuts and avocados.

== Wildlife and Conservation ==
Hoedspruit is a hub for wildlife conservation efforts. It is home to the Hoedspruit Endangered Species Centre (HESC), which was established in 1990 by Lente Roode. The centre focuses on the care, breeding, and rehabilitation of various species, particularly cheetahs. Since 2003, HESC has been registered as a cheetah breeding centre by the Convention on International Trade in Endangered Species (CITES).

The nearby Moholoholo Wildlife Rehabilitation Centre also contributes to the conservation of endangered species and rehabilitates injured and poisoned wildlife. Animals treated at the centre include lions, leopards, servals, cheetahs, crowned eagles, and vultures.

Hoedspruit hosts a field office of Conservation South Africa, and the organisation has taken part in community-based work in the Kruger to Canyons Biosphere Region (including the Phiring area) with local partners.

== Air Force Base Hoedspruit and Eastgate Airport ==
A makeshift airstrip was constructed near Hoedspruit in the early 1940s to serve as a training ground for South African Air Force (SAAF) pilots during World War II. The site's strategic importance led to the official commissioning of Air Force Base Hoedspruit in 1977. The base is home to 19 Squadron, a helicopter unit. The squadron, which formed on 1 September 1939, was the first to be equipped with the Oryx helicopter in early 1994 and moved to AFB Hoedspruit on 1 January 2004.

The civilian Eastgate Airport shares the airfield with the Air Force base. The airport's runways can accommodate aircraft ranging from small planes to large jet airliners, with its longest runway measuring 4,000 metres. Eastgate Airport is served by scheduled flights from Airlink and CemAir and is also used by several charter operators.
