= South African Civil Aviation Authority =

Agency overview
- Formed: 1 October 1998; 27 years ago
- Jurisdiction: Republic of South Africa
- Headquarters: Ikhaya Lokundiza, Byls Bridge Office Park, Doornkloof, Centurion, 0157; 25.864822°S 28.207614°E
- Annual budget: R 6.58 billion (2026/27)
- Minister responsible: Barbara Creecy, Minister of Transport
- Agency executives: Ernest Khosa, Chairperson of the Board; Poppy Khoza, Director of Civil Aviation
- Parent department: Department of Transport
- Key documents: Civil Aviation Authority Act, 1998; Civil Aviation Act, 2009
- Website: www.caa.co.za

The South African Civil Aviation Authority (SACAA or CAA) is the civil aviation authority of South Africa, overseeing civil aviation and governing investigations of aviation accidents and incidents. It is headquartered in Centurion, near Pretoria.

It was previously headquartered in Pretoria, and later Midrand.

== See also ==
- Railway Safety Regulator
- South African Maritime Safety Authority
