= Airlink Cargo =

South African cargo airline

IATA	ICAO	Call sign
4Z	LNK	LINK
- Founded: 2011
- Hubs: O. R. Tambo International Airport
- Fleet size: 2
- Destinations: 38
- Headquarters: Foreign Airlines Cargo Terminal; O. R. Tambo International Airport, Kempton Park, Gauteng, South Africa
- Key people: Rodger Foster (CEO and Managing Director)
- Website: www.airlinkcargo.co.za

Airlink Cargo is a division of SA Airlink (Pty) Ltd and provides air freight transport services to over 35 destinations across Southern Africa from its base at O. R. Tambo International Airport. The division was formed in 2011 after one British Aerospace Jetstream 41 passenger aircraft belonging to parent company Airlink was converted for freight operations, followed the next year by a second aircraft. Freight is also carried on Airlink Cargo's behalf by Airlink and Swaziland Airlink across the region. Airlink Cargo is headquartered on the grounds of their hub near Johannesburg, South Africa.

== History and services ==
The idea of an all-cargo airline service was proposed in early 2010 by the Airlink board and implemented in late 2011. Growing passenger demand at Airlink had resulted in insufficient space for cargo on board the airline's BAe Jetstream 41 aircraft. Passenger growth predictions forced the airline to convert two such aircraft for cargo operations only to satisfy demand for a quick and efficient regional air freight operation. A decision was also taken to convert all 16 of the airline's J41 aircraft for cargo operations after their retirement from passenger service, as a result of rapid growth in the regional freight market. The division offers transport services for general goods and services, live animals, dangerous goods, perishables and fragile, valuable and vulnerable cargo. They also offer customers an express service for transport within South Africa. All Airlink Cargo customers are able to track their shipment through the division's website.

== Destinations ==
Airlink Cargo serves the following destinations as of February 2016, operated by Airlink and Swaziland Airlink:

Botswana

- Gaborone – Sir Seretse Khama International Airport
- Kasane - Kasane Airport
- Maun - Maun Airport

Lesotho

- Maseru - Moshoeshoe I International Airport

Madagascar

- Antananarivo - Ivato International Airport
- Nosy Be - Fascene Airport

Mozambique

- Beira – Beira Airport
- Nampula - Nampula Airport
- Pemba - Pemba Airport
- Tete - Chingozi Airport
- Vilanculos - Vilankulo Airport

Namibia

- Windhoek – Hosea Kutako International Airport
- Walvis Bay – Walvis Bay Airport

South Africa

- Bloemfontein – Bloemfontein Airport
- Cape Town – Cape Town International Airport
- Durban – King Shaka International Airport
- East London – East London Airport
- George – George Airport
- Johannesburg – O.R. Tambo International Airport Hub
- Kimberley – Kimberley Airport
- Mthatha - Mthatha Airport
- Nelspruit - Kruger Mpumalanga International Airport
- Phalaborwa - Hendrik Van Eck Airport
- Pietermaritzburg - Pietermaritzburg Airport
- Polokwane - Polokwane International Airport
- Port Elizabeth – Port Elizabeth Airport
- Sishen - Sishen Airport
- Skukuza - Skukuza Airport
- Upington - Upington Airport

St Helena, Ascension and Tristan da Cunha

- Jamestown - St Helena Airport
- Georgetown - RAF Ascension Island

Swaziland

- Manzini - King Mswati III International Airport

Zambia

- Livingstone - Harry Mwanga Nkumbula International Airport
- Lusaka – Kenneth Kaunda International Airport
- Ndola - Simon Mwansa Kapwepwe International Airport

Zimbabwe

- Bulawayo – Joshua Mqabuko Nkomo International Airport
- Harare – Harare International Airport
- Victoria Falls – Victoria Falls Airport

== Fleet ==
Airlink Cargo fleet
Aircraft	In service	Notes
Cessna 208 Caravan	2	Using Airlink's LodgeLink Cessna caravans by removing the passenger seats.
Total	2	

Airlink and Swaziland Airlink carry cargo on board passenger flights for Airlink Cargo.

- Airlink operates a mix of 17 Embraer ERJ 135 aircraft, 11 Embraer ERJ 140, 3 Embraer 170 aircraft, 12 Embraer 190 aircraft, 4 BAe Jetstream 41 aircraft and 2 Cessna Grand Caravan aircraft.
- Swaziland Airlink operates 1 Embraer ERJ-135 aircraft.
- Airlink Cargo destinations whilst utilizing the Cessna Caravans are: Maputo Mozambique, Gaborone Botswana and Maseru Lesotho. But destinations may vary depending on the requests from customers.
