= Fly Blue Crane =

South African airline company

IATA	ICAO	Call sign
7B	FCO	BLUE CRANE
- Founded: 1 September 2015
- Ceased operations: 3 February 2017
- Hubs: O. R. Tambo International Airport
- Headquarters: Johannesburg, South Africa
- Key people: Siza Mzimela (CEO); Theunis Potgieter (CCO)

Fly Blue Crane was a South African regional airline based in Johannesburg, with its hub at O. R. Tambo International Airport, Johannesburg, South Africa. The company slogan is A fresh approach.

== History ==
The airline started services on 1 September 2015 and was initially using two Embraer ERJ 145 aircraft on services between Johannesburg, Bloemfontein, Kimberley and Nelspruit. On 14 November 2016 Fly Blue Crane entered into business rescue and on 3 February 2017, the airline announced that they had to discontinue flights indefinitely as they restructure their operations. Flights have not resumed since, and their website is inoperative.

== Destinations ==
Fly Blue Crane flew to the following destinations before, on 3 February 2017, the airline announced that it had cancelled all flights 'as part of a business rescue plan':

Country	City	Airport	Notes	Ref.
South Africa	Bloemfontein	Bloemfontein Airport	(suspended)	
South Africa	Cape Town	Cape Town International Airport	(suspended)	
South Africa	Johannesburg	O. R. Tambo International Airport	(suspended)	
South Africa	Kimberley	Kimberley Airport	(suspended)	
South Africa	Mthatha	Mthatha Airport	(suspended)	
South Africa	Nelspruit	Kruger Mpumalanga International Airport	Terminated	

== Fleet ==
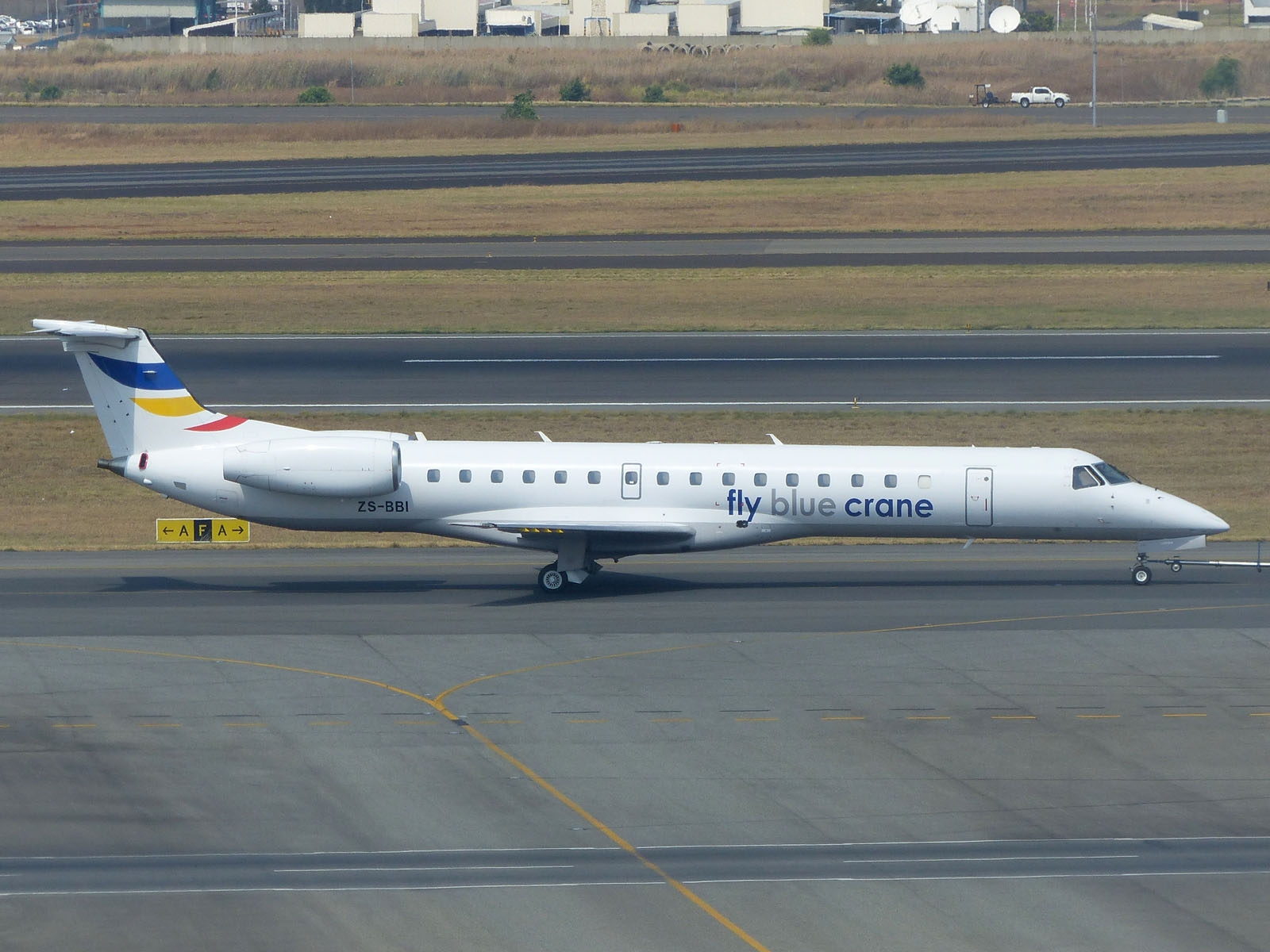
Fly Blue Crane Embraer ERJ 145

Fly Blue Crane operated the following aircraft as of August 2016:

Fly Blue Crane fleet
Aircraft	In service	Orders	Passengers	Notes
Aircraft	In service	Orders	Y	Notes
Embraer ERJ 145	2	—	50	
Total	2	0		
