= Pelican Air Services =

South African based airline

IATA	ICAO	Call sign
7V	PDF	PELICAN AIRWAYS
- Founded: 2001
- Ceased operations: 2009
- Hubs: O.R. Tambo International Airport
- Fleet size: 1 (defunct)
- Parent company: Federal Air
- Headquarters: Johannesburg, South Africa
- Website: http://www.pelicanair.co.za

Pelican Air Services was a trading name of Federal Air, an airline based in Johannesburg, South Africa. It now trades under the name Federal Air, and no longer uses the Pelican Air branding.

It operated scheduled services. Its main base was O.R. Tambo International Airport, Johannesburg, with hubs at Vilankulo Airport, Mozambique and at Kruger Mpumalanga International Airport.

== History ==
The airline was established by PWD Farquhar in the late 1990s in association with TTA Mozambique. In 2001 JF Pienaar joined the company (PWD Farquhar (67%) and JF Pienaar (33%)) and had 19 employees (at March 2007).

== Destinations ==
Pelican Air Services operated services from Johannesburg to Vilanculos, and onto the Bazaruto Archipelago in association with Mozambique airline, ASAS de Moçambique.

== Fleet ==
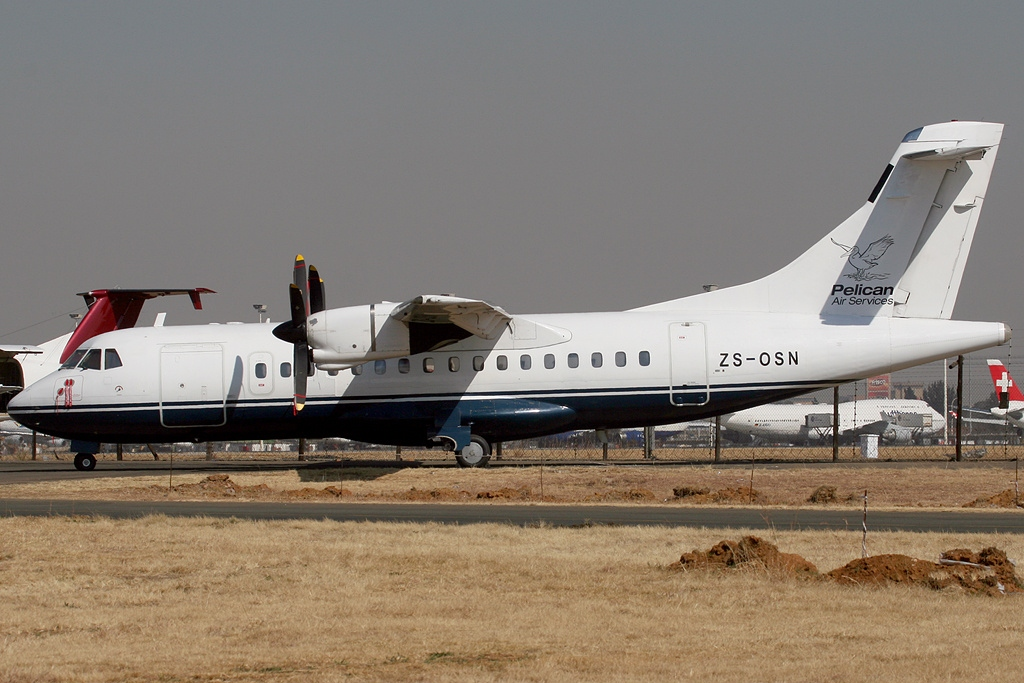
A ATR 42 of Pelican Air Service

As of 29 November 2009 the Pelican Air Services fleet included:

- 1 ATR 42-320 (which was operated by Solenta Aviation)
