= Airlink =

Regional airline in South Africa

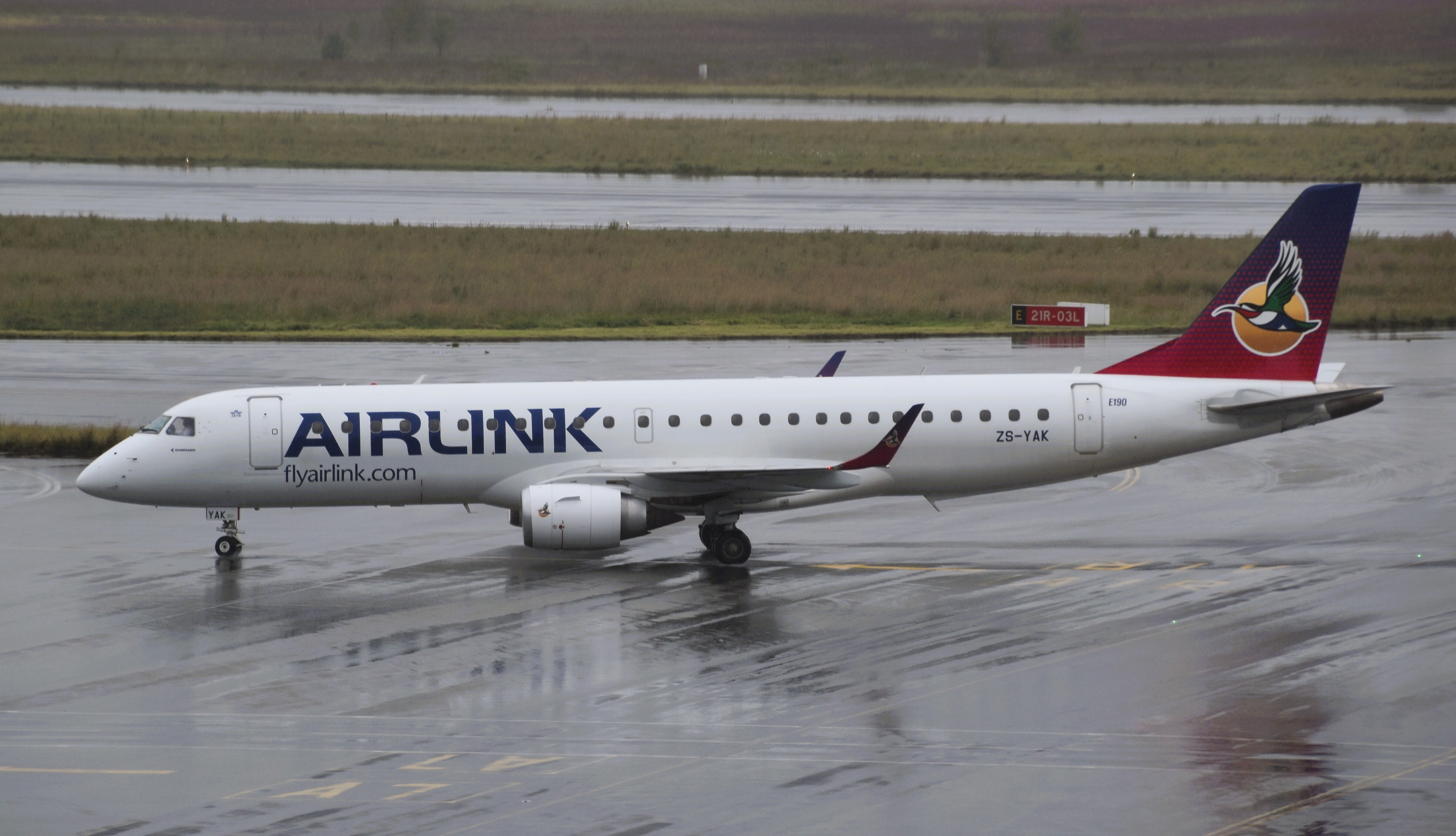
- Airlink Embraer 190 taxiing at O.R. Tambo International Airport
IATA	ICAO	Call sign
4Z	LNK	LINK
- Founded: 11 June 1992; 34 years ago
- Hubs: Cape Town; Johannesburg–O. R. Tambo
- Frequent-flyer program: Skybucks
- Subsidiaries: Airlink Cargo; FlyNamibia (40%)
- Fleet size: 70
- Destinations: 51
- Headquarters: Johannesburg, South Africa
- Key people: De Villiers Engelbrecht (CEO) (from 1 April 2025); Roger Foster (Co-Founder and Non-Executive Director)
- Website: www.flyairlink.com

Airlink (previously known as South African Airlink) is a regional airline based in Johannesburg, South Africa. Initially, its main business was the provision of services between smaller, under-served towns and larger hub airports. It has since expanded to offer flights on larger, mainline routes.

The airline has a network of more than 60 routes to over 45 destinations in Southern Africa. In January 2021, it became the second-largest carrier within Africa by number of flights, and third-largest by number of seats.

== History ==
=== Early years ===
Airlink was formed in 1992 by business partners Rodger Foster and Barrie Webb, following the purchase of the liquidated Link Airways business, which had incorporated a range of other airlines: Midlands Aviation (founded in 1967), Lowveld Aviation Services, Magnum Airlines, Border Air and Citi Air. The new airline was named Airlink.

In 1995, SA Airlink officially launched on 25 March at a gathering of important guests, including Queen Elizabeth II. Later that year, the airline aligned its branding with that of South African Airways and joined their Voyager frequent-flyer programme.

In 1997, SA Airlink further strengthened their partnership with South African Airways, and joined both SAA and South African Express in a strategic alliance. This alliance and partnership created the biggest airline network in Africa. The alliance was governed by a franchise agreement, which saw SA Airlink adopt the "South African" brand identity and become South African Airlink.

In 1999, South African Airlink entered into a joint venture with the government of Swaziland (now Eswatini) to create a new airline to replace the defunct Royal Swazi National Airways. The airline was called Swaziland Airlink and was split 60% to the Swaziland government and 40% to South African Airlink. In August 2000, the strategic alliance with South African Airways was further strengthened as a bilateral partnership.

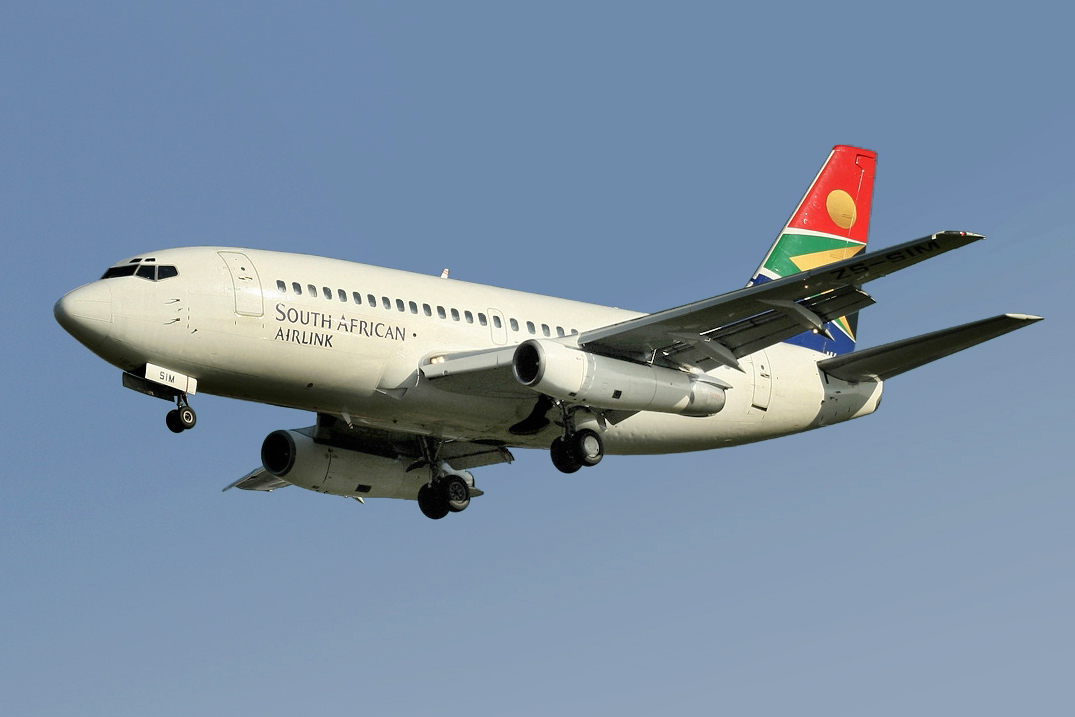
A former South African Airlink Boeing 737-200 in 2007

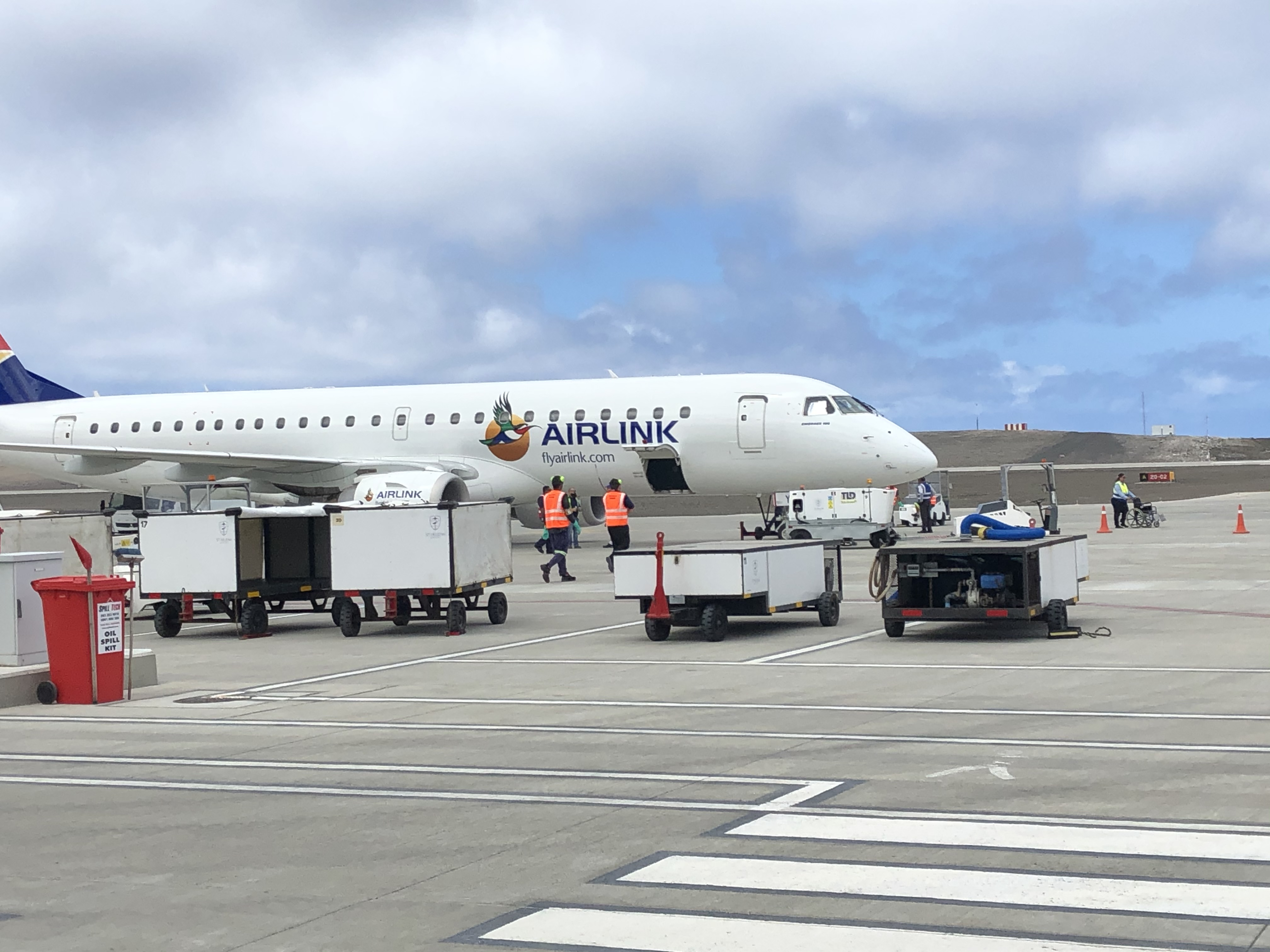
In 2017, using an Embraer 190 Airlink began history's first scheduled commercial flight service to the island of Saint Helena, in the South Atlantic Ocean.

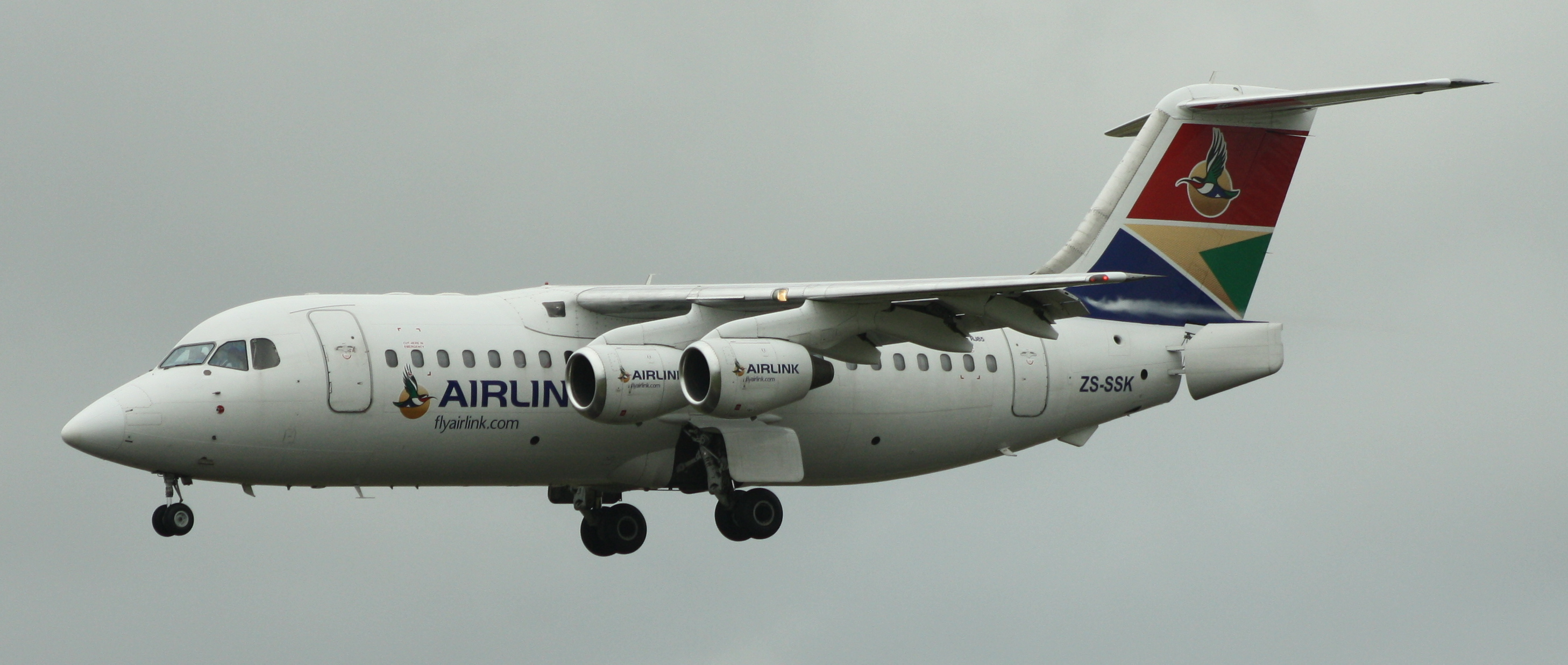
A former Airlink BAe 146-200 in 2015

In 2006, South African Airlink exited the strategic alliance with South African Airways and entered into a franchise agreement, dropping the "South African" branding from their name, but retaining a similar colour scheme. SA Airlink introduced their unique Sunbird logo as part of the new branding.

In February 2008, SA Airlink successfully completed the IATA Operational Safety Audit (IOSA), and was placed on the IATA registry with code "4Z".

On 23 December 2009, the SA Civil Aviation Authority grounded their fleet of 13 BAe Jetstream 41 planes. Following audits of the airline's procedures and inspection of the grounded aircraft, they were returned to service. A problem with a seal in the aircraft's Honeywell engines was found to be the cause of safety issues.

In 2016, SA Airlink signed an agreement with the government of Madagascar to operate scheduled domestic air services within it, and regional air services to and from the island. The airline also established a training centre in partnership with Embraer at their headquarters in Bonaero Park, Johannesburg.

On 3 May 2017, Airlink became the first airline in history to make a commercial charter flight to Saint Helena in the South Atlantic Ocean, landing a BAe Avro RJ-85 at the newly constructed Saint Helena Airport to pick up passengers stranded there when the island's only link with the outside world, the British Royal Mail Ship RMS St Helena, suffered propeller damage.

No other commercial airliner landed at St Helena until 14 October 2017, when Airlink began history's first scheduled commercial airline service to Saint Helena Airport, with an Embraer 190 with 78 passengers aboard arriving after a flight of about six hours from Johannesburg, with a stop at Walvis Bay, Namibia. The flight began a once-a-week scheduled service between Johannesburg and Saint Helena.

In 2018, SA Airlink and FlySafair concluded negotiations for a merger. The application was turned down by the South African Competition Commission on the basis that it believed that regional airline SA Airlink and low-cost carrier FlySafair were competitors. The matter was referred to the Tribunal, but the application was withdrawn as the shareholders' objectives of both companies had changed. In 2019, SA Airlink expanded its training centre in cooperation with Embraer to house both an Embraer 190 and an Embraer ERJ-145 full flight simulator.

=== Separation from South African Airways ===
In 2020, SA Airlink changed its name from SA Airlink to Airlink. The change was made to distinguish the company as an independent airline. Airlink ended its 23-year old franchise agreement with South African Airways in the early part of 2020. It has been operating and issuing tickets under its own 4Z ticket stock instead of South African Airways' SA code since then, and signed its own interline agreements with six other carriers.

On 12 November 2020, Airlink unveiled a new livery, dropping any similarities to the South African Airways brand and incorporating the Sunbird logo set against sunrise colours as the main focal point of the new tail insignia. The first aircraft to sport the design were scheduled to fly during the December holiday season in 2020.

In January 2021, Airlink became the third largest carrier within Africa by number of seats offered, and second largest by number of flights scheduled. This is mainly due to Airlink's use of lower capacity aircraft and the opening up of new markets due to the decline of South African Airways.

In March 2022, Airlink committed to a commercial partnership with Federal Airlines, to operate its Lodgelink flights in the Lowveld. The flights connect from either Kruger International or Skukuza to lodges within the Lowveld and Northern KwaZulu Natal.

In September 2022, Airlink acquired a 40% stake, labelled a strategic equity holding, in Namibian airline FlyNamibia for an undisclosed sum. The acquisition will have FlyNamibia adopt Airlink's "4Z" flight designation. Airlink will also provide technical and commercial training to FlyNamibia staff.

== Corporate affairs ==
=== Ownership ===
Airlink is privately owned, but has published the names of its shareholders:

- Sishen Iron Ore Company Community Development Trust (32.5%)
- Coronation Capital
- SA Airlink Investments (Rodger Foster)
- Barrie Webb
- South African Airways (2.96%)

Sishen Iron Ore Company Community Development Trust, via its subsidiary Sishen Iron Ore Company Community Development Trust Investment Holdings, acquired a 32.5% stake in the company in June 2012. The original founders, Airlink, Rodger Foster and Barrie Webb, remain shareholders.

In August 2024, Qatar Airways acquired a 25% shareholding. Qatar Airways' stake is the maximum foreign ownership amount permissible under South African law. As part of the purchase agreement, Qatar Airways will hold two of the fourteen seats on Airlink's board.

=== Head office ===
Airlink's head office is in the 3rd office block of the Greenstone Office Park in the Greenstone Hill suburb of Ekurhuleni in Gauteng, South Africa.

== Programs ==
=== Skybucks ===
Airlink announced that its loyalty programme would be launched on 1 March 2023. This comes after numerous customer suggestions to be rewarded for their loyalty to Airlink, which left the Southern African airline overwhelmed.

The frequent flyer program will include three membership tiers, with eligibility determined by the number of sectors or legs of a journey flown in 12 months. A regular return flight from Johannesburg's OR Tambo to Durban's King Shaka comprises two sectors.

=== SLOW Lounge ===
Since August 2022, Airlink's premium and qualifying passengers travelling on its domestic and regional flights, have access to SLOW lounges at Johannesburg's, Cape Town's and Durban's international airports.

== Destinations ==
As of September 2024, Airlink serves the following destinations:

Country	City	Airport	Notes	Refs
Angola	Luanda	Quatro de Fevereiro Airport		
Botswana	Gaborone	Sir Seretse Khama International Airport		
Botswana	Kasane	Kasane Airport		
Botswana	Maun	Maun Airport		
Democratic Republic of the Congo	Lubumbashi	Lubumbashi International Airport		
Eswatini	Manzini	King Mswati III International Airport		
Kenya	Nairobi	Jomo Kenyatta International Airport		
Lesotho	Maseru	Moshoeshoe I International Airport		
Madagascar	Antananarivo	Ivato International Airport		
Madagascar	Nosy Be	Fascene Airport		
Malawi	Lilongwe	Lilongwe International Airport		
Malawi	Blantyre	Chileka International Airport		
Mauritius	Plaine Magnien	Sir Seewoosagur Ramgoolam International Airport		
Mozambique	Beira	Beira Airport		
Mozambique	Maputo	Maputo International Airport		
Mozambique	Nampula	Nampula Airport		
Mozambique	Pemba	Pemba Airport		
Mozambique	Tete	Chingozi Airport		
Mozambique	Vilanculos	Vilankulo Airport		
Namibia	Walvis Bay	Walvis Bay Airport		
Namibia	Windhoek	Hosea Kutako International Airport		
Saint Helena	Jamestown	Saint Helena Airport		
South Africa	Arathusa Safari Lodge	Arathusa Safari Lodge Airstrip	Terminated	
South Africa	Bloemfontein	Bram Fischer International Airport		
South Africa	Cape Town	Cape Town International Airport	Hub	
South Africa	Durban	Durban International Airport	Airport closed	
South Africa	Durban	King Shaka International Airport		
South Africa	East London	King Phalo Airport		
South Africa	Gqeberha	Chief Dawid Stuurman International Airport		
South Africa	George	George Airport		
South Africa	Hoedspruit	Eastgate Airport		
South Africa	Johannesburg	O. R. Tambo International Airport	Hub	
South Africa	Kimberley	Kimberley Airport		
South Africa	Londolozi Game Reserve	Londolozi Aerodrome	Terminated	
South Africa	Mbombela	Kruger Mpumalanga International Airport		
South Africa	Mthatha	Mthatha Airport		
South Africa	Ngala Safari Lodge	Ngala Airport	Terminated	
South Africa	Phinda Game Reserve	Phinda Airfield	Terminated	
South Africa	Pietermaritzburg	Pietermaritzburg Airport		
South Africa	Polokwane	Polokwane International Airport		
South Africa	Richards Bay	Richards Bay Airport		
South Africa	Sishen	Sishen Airport		
South Africa	Skukuza	Skukuza Airport		
South Africa	Ulusaba Game Reserve	Ulusaba Airport	Terminated	
South Africa	Upington	Upington Airport		
Tanzania	Dar es Salaam	Julius Nyerere International Airport		
Uganda	Entebbe	Entebbe International Airport	Terminated	
Zambia	Livingstone	Harry Mwaanga Nkumbula International Airport		
Zambia	Lusaka	Kenneth Kaunda International Airport		
Zambia	Ndola	Simon Mwansa Kapwepwe International Airport		
Zimbabwe	Bulawayo	Joshua Mqabuko Nkomo International Airport		
Zimbabwe	Harare	Robert Gabriel Mugabe International Airport		
Zimbabwe	Victoria Falls	Victoria Falls Airport		

=== Codeshare agreements ===
Airlink codeshares with the following airlines:

- Air France
- British Airways
- KLM
- LATAM Chile
- LATAM Brasil
- Lufthansa
- Qantas
- Qatar Airways
- Swiss International Air Lines
- Turkish Airlines
- United Airlines

=== Interline agreements ===
Airlink has interline agreements with the following airlines:

- Air Botswana
- Air China
- Air Mauritius
- Air Seychelles
- Cathay Pacific
- Condor
- Delta Air Lines
- Emirates
- Ethiopian Airlines
- Etihad Airways
- Kenya Airways
- LAM Mozambique Airlines
- LATAM Brasil
- LATAM Chile
- Precision Air
- RwandAir
- Saudia
- Singapore Airlines
- TAAG Angola Airlines
- Turkish Airlines
- Uganda Airlines
- Virgin Atlantic

== Fleet ==
=== Current fleet ===
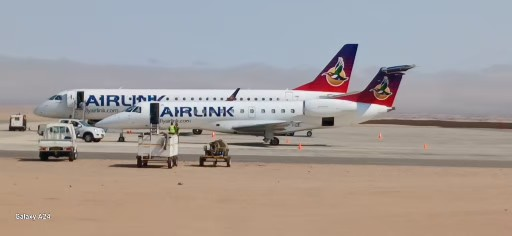
Embraer ERJ-135 (foreground) and Embraer 190 at Walvis Bay

As of December 2025, Airlink operates an all-Embraer fleet:

Aircraft	In service	Orders	Passengers			Notes
Aircraft	In service	Orders	J	Y	Total	Notes
Embraer ERJ-135	16	—	—	37	37	
Embraer ERJ-140	11	—	—	44	44	
Embraer 170	2	—	6	68	74	
Embraer 175	4	—	—	88	88	
Embraer 190	28	—	6	92	98	
Embraer 190	28	—	11	88	99	
Embraer 190	28	—	—	106	106	
Embraer 190	28	—	—	98	98	
Embraer 195	6	—	11	96	107	
Embraer 195-E2	4	6	124			Deliveries from 2025 until 2027.
Embraer 195-E2	4	6	136			Deliveries from 2025 until 2027.
Total	71	6				

=== Historical fleet ===
Airlink has previously operated the following aircraft:

Aircraft	Total	Introduced	Retired	Notes
ATR 42-300	3	1992	1995	
Avro RJ85	12	2008	2019	
BAe 146-200	4	2007	2013	
BAe Jetstream 41	16	1995	2023	
Boeing 737-200	1	2006	2007	Leased from Safair
Boeing 737-300	1	2022	2024	Leased from Star Air
Cessna 208B	5	2015	2022	
Dornier 228-100	1	1993	1997	
Dornier 228-200	1	1995	1997	
Embraer ERJ-145	31	2012	2018	ZS-DFA leased from NAC
Fokker F28-4000	3	2003	2005	Leased from AirQuarius
Swearingen Merlin II	3	1992	1997	

== Incidents and accidents ==
- On 24 September 2009, Airlink Flight 8911, a BAe Jetstream 41 ZS-NRM on a positioning flight from Durban International Airport to Pietermaritzburg Airport crashed into the grounds of Merebank Secondary School, Durban shortly after takeoff. The crew declared an emergency, reporting loss of engine power and smoke coming from the rear of the aircraft. The pilots ditched the aircraft on the sports field of the school, avoiding hitting nearby residential areas. The school was closed due to it being a public holiday. All three crew members and one person on the ground were injured. The captain, Allister Freeman, later died as a result of complications from his injuries on 7 October 2009.
- On 7 December 2009, Airlink Flight 8625, an Embraer ERJ-135 ZS-SJW overran the runway on landing in wet weather at George Airport. No fatalities were reported. The flight was cleared for an Instrument landing (ILS) approach and prevailing weather conditions at the time were overcast with light rain. The landing appeared normal, however the aircraft did not vacate the runway but instead veered to the right and collided with approach lights before it burst through the airport's perimeter fence, coming to rest in a nose-down attitude on a public road. The aircraft was damaged beyond repair. The crew were unable to stop the aircraft due to ineffective braking of the aircraft on the wet runway surface. Two months before the accident the runway was treated with a fog sealant. The day of the accident was the first rain experienced since the runway treatment. The new surface caused a degradation of the surface friction and promoted the formation of pooling. After touch down, the aircraft immediately started aquaplaning and the crew veered to the right to prevent a collision with the localiser antenna. The runway was found non-compliant with ICAO annexe 14 and was subsequently resurfaced. Airlink's insurers took legal action against the state-owned Airports Company of South Africa.
- On 8 November 2017, Airlink Flight 8103, an Avro 146-RJ85A, registered ZS-ASW, took off from Harare International Airport bound for OR Tambo International Airport. 38 minutes into the flight, the number 2 engine suffered an Uncontained Engine Failure that hurled fragments into the No. 1 engine, causing it to fail. The crew elected to continue to OR Tambo International Airport, despite Makhado Air Force Base being in close proximity to the aircraft at the time of failure. The aircraft landed safely at OR Tambo International Airport with no injuries reported. The failure was caused by a dislodged retaining nut, resulting in the turbine disk coming off the shaft.
