= Siza Mzimela =

Sizakele Petunia Mzimela
- Born: Sizakele Petunia Mzimela
- Citizenship: South African
- Occupations: Airline executive, businesswoman
- Years active: 1996–present
- Known for: First black woman to start an airline; former CEO of South African Airways; founder of Fly Blue Crane
- Title: Chief Executive Officer, Transnet Freight Rail
- Board member of: Cargo Carriers, Etion Limited, Africa Reinsurance Corporation
- Awards: Forbes Most Powerful Women (2011)

Sizakele Petunia Mzimela, known as Siza Mzimela, is credited as the first black woman to start an airline. She is Transnet Freight Rail Chief Executive Officer. Mzimela is charged with ensuring that TFR is the author of globally competitive regional freight system that enables sustained growth and diversification of the region's economies, enables economic growth by lowering the cost of doing business, and ensures reliable freight system through on-time scheduling and execution of train services. She was listed as one of Forbes magazine's most powerful women in 2011.

== Career ==
Mzimela joined the South African Airways (SAA) national airline in January 1996 as a research analyst. She subsequently headed global sales and SAA's Voyager loyalty programme, as CEO from 1 April 2010 until 8 October 2012. She was the first female member of the board of governors of the International Air Transport Association, based in Miami, Florida, US.

On 1 September 2015, Mzimela started the airline Fly Blue Crane. Fly Blue Crane entered business rescue 15 months later and terminated all services on 3 February 2017.

She was appointed interim CEO of South African Express in April 2017, which was forced into business rescue on 28 April 2020 by its creditors.

On 1 April 2020, Mzimela joined Transnet as CEO of its freight rail division. She is currently the Vice President of SARA (Southern Africa Railways Association) She also chairs the board of JSE-listed company Cargo Carriers and services as Non-Executive Director on the board of JSE-listed technology company, Etion Limited. Additionally, Siza is on the board of reinsurance company, Africa Reinsurance Corporation.

On 4 December 2022, the Minerals Council South Africa wrote to Transnet board chairperson Popo Molefe, calling for the dismissal of Transnet CEO Portia Derby and Transnet Freight Rail CEO Sizakele Mzimela. The letter warned, "Given that Transnet SOC’s operating performance is deteriorating, we cannot see how the company will avoid breaching its debt covenants early in 2023, at which stage the directors of Transnet SOC will need to place the company into liquidation or risk being sued for trading recklessly."

=== Fly Blue Crane ===
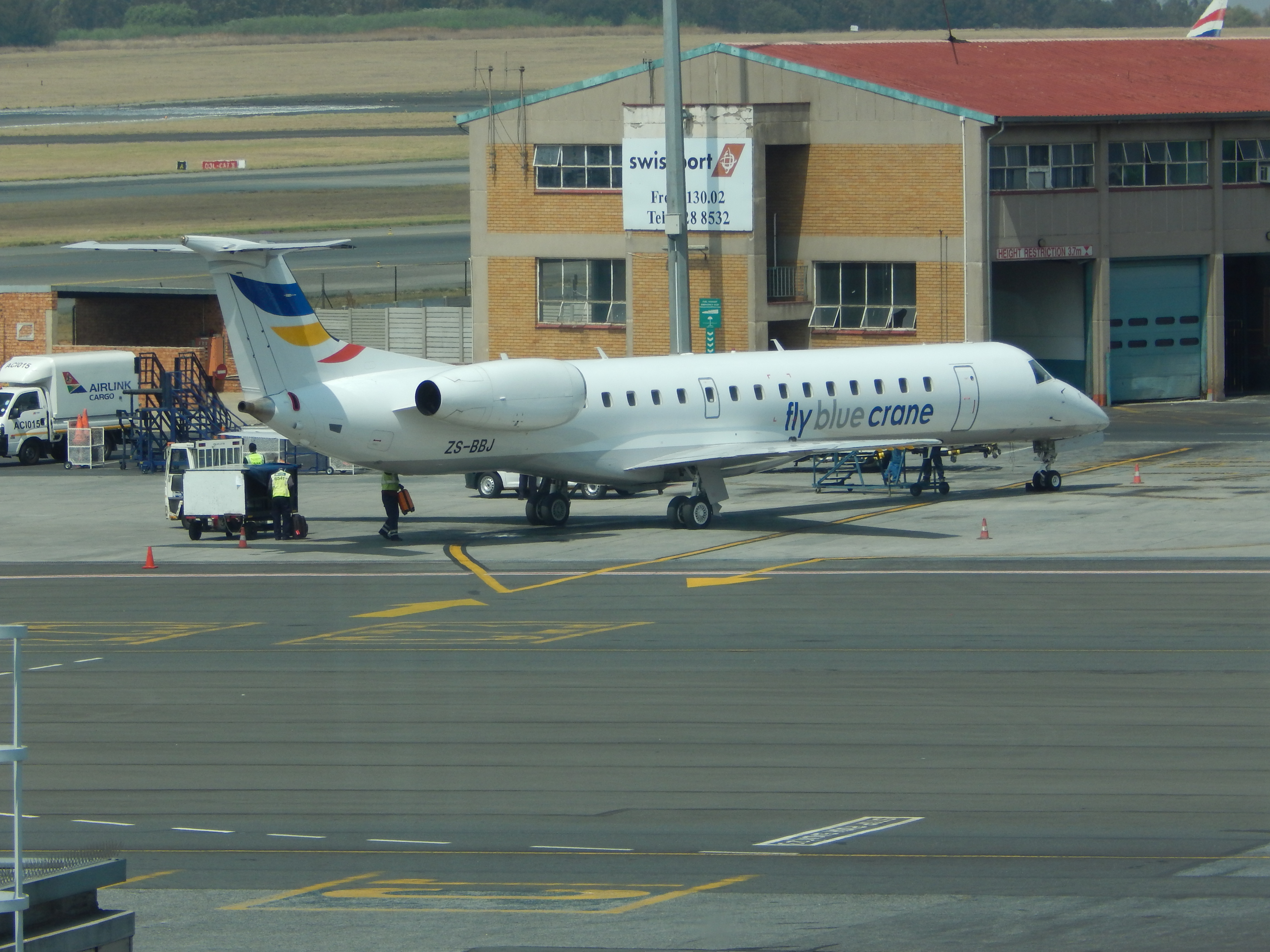
Fly Blue Crane Embraer ERJ 145 at OR Tambo International Airport a couple of weeks after the launch of the airline in September 2015.

Fly Blue Crane was launched on 1 September 2015 by Mzimela and two ex-SAA colleagues, Jerome Simelane and Theunis Potgieter. One year later, it had grown to employ over 100 people. Within 5 more months, on 14 November 2016, Fly Blue Crane became insolvent and entered into business rescue. Operations of Fly Blue Crane were suspended indefinitely on 3 February 2017.

Mzimela said at the launch of Fly Blue Crane that she hoped to expand the airline to include routes to Botswana, Namibia, Zimbabwe and the Democratic Republic of Congo.
