= Federal Air =

South African airline

Federal Airlines
IATA	ICAO	Call sign
7V	FDR	FEDAIR
- Founded: 1989
- Hubs: OR Tambo International Airport, Kruger Mpumalanga International Airport
- Alliance: Solenta Aviation
- Fleet size: 17
- Destinations: 7+
- Parent company: Federal Holdings (Pty) Ltd
- Headquarters: OR Tambo International Airport; Kempton Park, Ekurhuleni, Gauteng, South Africa
- Key people: Lourens Engelbrecht (CEO); Rachel Muir (Director)
- Website: fedair.com

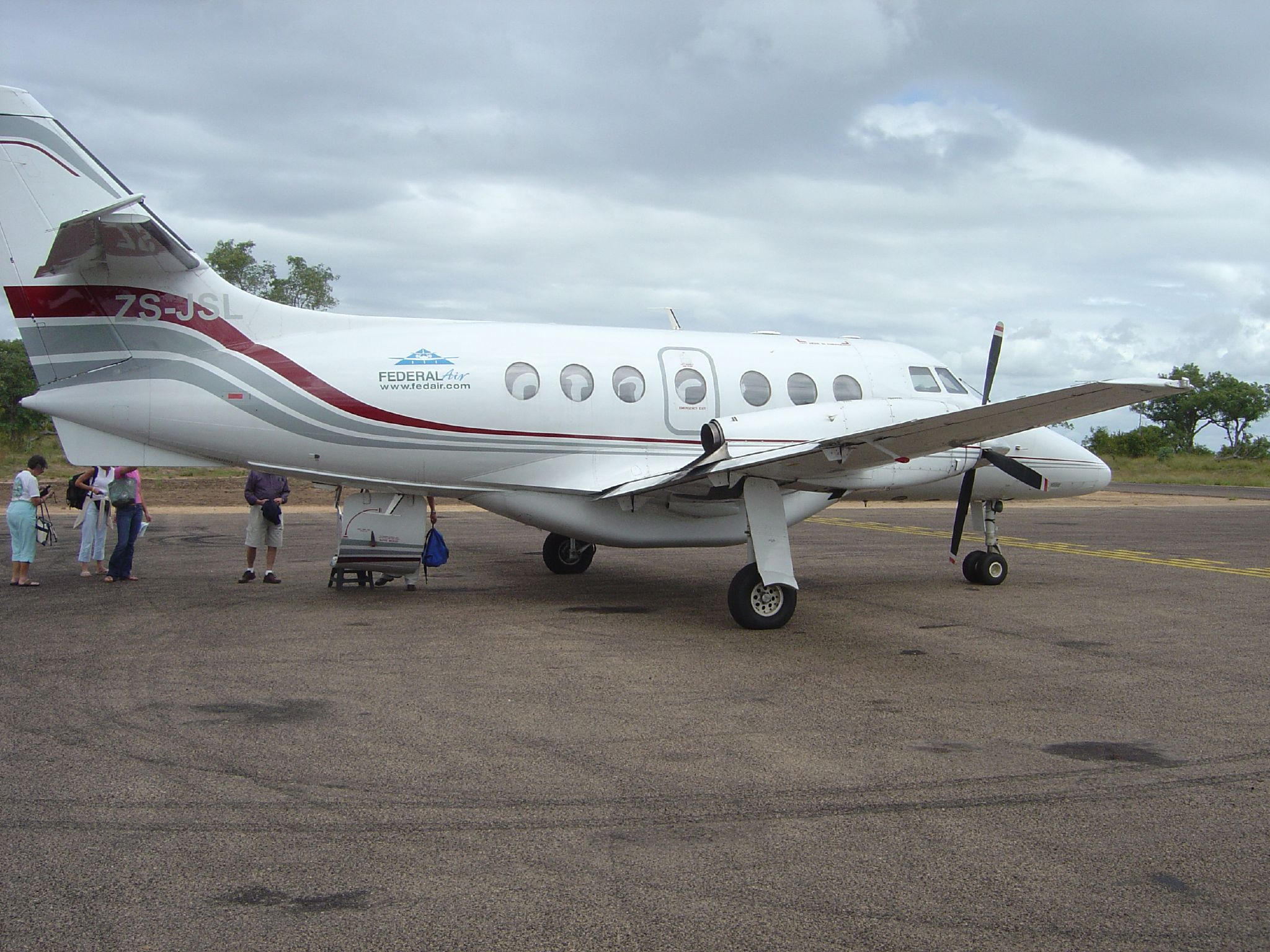
A Federal Air British Aerospace Jetstream 31 in Ulusaba

Federal Air is a South African airline headquartered at O. R. Tambo International Airport near Johannesburg. It specializes in flights to luxury safari lodges and operates air shuttle, scheduled, and charter services throughout Southern Africa.

The airline's main base is in Johannesburg, with hubs at Kruger Mpumalanga International Airport and Vilanculos Airport. It operates daily flights to Kruger National Park, Sabi Sand Game Reserve, Madikwe Game Reserve, and other private game reserves in South Africa.

== History ==
The airline was established in 1989 as Comair Charters (Natal). It was rebranded as Federal Air (Fedair) in 1993. The company later acquired and absorbed Pelican Air Services to expand its scheduled air shuttle services. In 2012, Federal Air merged with Bateleur Air Charter.

== Corporate Affairs ==
=== Ownership ===
Federal Air operates under the legal entity Federal Airlines (Pty) Ltd. As of 2014, its shareholding structure was Federal Holdings (Pty) Ltd (45%), with the remaining shares held by C. W. F. Trieloff (12.5%), E. H. Bailie (12.5%), N. B. Taylor (12.5%), T. J. Reiser (12.5%), P. R. van Schalkwyk (1.5%), and R. M. Muir (3.5%). The airline has a close operational relationship with Solenta Aviation, sharing a group CEO in 2020 and a maintenance services agreement established in 2019.

=== Management ===
In November 2012, Evan Baillie took over as Managing Director from Troy Reiser, and Rachel Muir was appointed Financial and Administrative Director. As of 2025, the CEO is Lourens Engelbrecht. Rachel Muir has served as a Director since March 2006.

=== Business Model ===
Federal Air positions itself as a leader in air travel to safari destinations in Southern Africa. The company focuses on shuttle services connecting O. R. Tambo International Airport to the Sabi Sand, Timbavati, and Madikwe Game Reserves, and also offers a private charter division for customized flights. The airline operates within the context of a significant regional market; the Africa safari tourism market was valued at $16.90 billion in 2023, with South Africa accounting for 23.92% of market revenue.

== Destinations ==
Federal Air provides services to the following destinations:

- Johannesburg - OR Tambo International Airport (hub)
- Hoedspruit - Eastgate Airport
- Mbombela - Kruger Mpumalanga International Airport (hub)
- Phinda Private Game Reserve
- Pietermaritzburg - Oribi Airport
- Sabi Sand Game Reserve - Ulusaba Airstrip
- Madikwe Game Reserve
- Marakele National Park
- Durban - Virginia Airport

== Operations ==
Federal Air operates between 22 and 25 flights daily from its hubs in Johannesburg and Mbombela. Its lodge transfer operations carry up to 50,000 passengers annually.

=== Regulatory and Safety ===
The airline is licensed and regulated by the South African Civil Aviation Authority (SACAA). In early 2025, Federal Air temporarily paused flights to some private game lodges pending their compliance with new regulations requiring all commercial aerodromes to be licensed. The airline later resumed services on 71% of its safari shuttle network as airfields received regulatory approval.

In May 2025, the airline signed a memorandum of understanding with Mayday-SA, a non-profit organization, to promote mental health and well-being for its aviation personnel.

== Fleet ==
In October 2023, Federal Air invested R350 million in six new Cessna Grand Caravan C208B EX aircraft, financed through a seven-year revolving credit facility with Investec.

As of April 2025, the Federal Air fleet consists of the following aircraft:

Federal Air fleet
Aircraft	In fleet	Notes
Cessna C208 Caravan	10	Includes seven C208B EX Grand Caravans
Pilatus PC-12	4	Includes two PC-12NGs
Beechcraft 1900D	1	
Embraer E145	2	
Total	17	
