= Air Force Base Bloemspruit =

Air base of the South African Air Force in Bloemfontein

AFB Bloemspruit Air Force Base Bloemspruit
- IATA: BFN; ICAO: FABL

Summary
- Airport type: Public / military
- Operator: South African Air Force; ACSA
- Location: Bloemfontein, Free State, South Africa
- Elevation AMSL: 4,458 ft (1,359 m)
- Coordinates: 29°06′00″S 26°18′25″E
- Website: www.af.mil.za/bases/afb_bloemspruit/

Map
- Location in the Free State

Runways
Direction	Length		Surface
Direction	m	ft	Surface
02/20	2,559	8,396	Asphalt
12/30	2,195	7,202	Asphalt
- Co-located with Bloemfontein Airport

AFB Bloemspruit is an airbase of the South African Air Force. It is co-located with Bloemfontein Airport (ICAO: FABL), and shares the airfield.

The base motto is Ex Unite Pax ("Peace Through Unity").

The unit is also responsible for maintaining the military airstrip at Vastrap, near Upington.

== Units hosted ==
- 16 Squadron - Attack helicopter squadron
- 87 Helicopter Flying School - Helicopter training unit
- 106 Squadron - Light transport reserve
- 107 Squadron - Light transport reserve
- 506 Squadron - Security services

== Aviation ==
- Non-directional beacon - BL380.0
- VHF omnidirectional range - BLV114.1
- Automatic Terminal Information Service - 126.45
