= 2012 South African Air Force C-47 crash =

Aviation accident in South Africa

Coordinates: 29°23′S 29°27′E

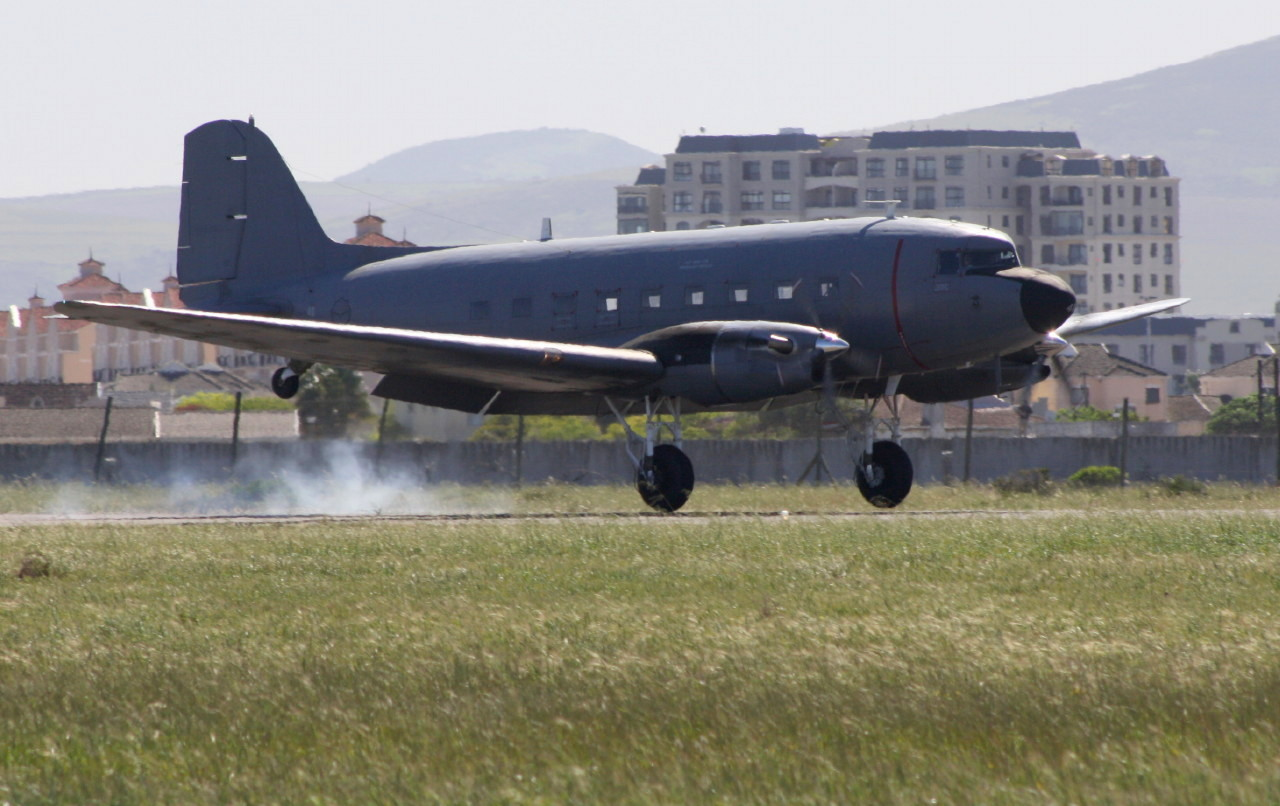
- 6840, the C-47 Dakota involved in the accident, photographed in 2010

Accident
- Date: 5 December 2012
- Summary: Pilot error
- Site: Drakensberg Mountains, KwaZulu Natal, South Africa

Aircraft
- Aircraft type: Douglas C-47 Dakota
- Operator: 35 Sqn, South African Air Force
- Registration: 6840
- Flight origin: AFB Waterkloof, Pretoria, South Africa
- Destination: Mthatha Airport, South Africa
- Occupants: 11
- Passengers: 6
- Crew: 5
- Fatalities: 11
- Survivors: 0

On 5 December 2012, a Douglas C-47 Dakota of the South African Air Force crashed in the Drakensberg Mountains, South Africa, killing all eleven people on board.

== Accident ==
The aircraft was on a flight from AFB Waterkloof to Mthatha Airport when it crashed near Giant's Castle in the Drakensberg, killing all eleven people on board. Shortly before the crash at 09:45 hours South African Standard Time (07:45 UTC), the crew reported that they were flying on instruments at 11,000 feet (3,400 m) in instrument meteorological conditions.

On board were six crew members and five passengers. Former South African President Nelson Mandela's medical team were initially reported to have been on board the aircraft, but this was later found not to be the case. An initial search by an Atlas Oryx helicopter had to be abandoned due to poor visibility.

== Aircraft ==
The aircraft involved was Douglas C-47TP, tail number 6840, c/n 13866. It had been built in 1943 as 43-48050 for the United States Army Air Forces and was transferred to the Royal Air Force in 1944 as KG767 before being immediately transferred to the South African Air Force as 6840. In the early 1990s, the aircraft was modified with Pratt & Whitney Canada PT-6A turboprop engines and a fuselage extension. Based at AFB Ysterplaat, Cape Town, it was mainly used in the maritime patrol role but also acted as a support aircraft for the Silver Falcons display team.

== Investigation ==
A Board of Inquiry was convened by the South African Air Force to investigate the cause of the accident.
