= Vastrap =

Vastrap Test Range Airfield
- IATA: none; ICAO: FAVS

Summary
- Airport type: Military (AFB Bloemspruit)
- Operator: SAAF
- Location: Vastrap Weapons Range
- Elevation AMSL: 3,234 ft (986 m)
- Coordinates: 27°50′5″S 21°37′50″E
- Interactive map of Vastrap Test Range Airfield

Runways
Direction	Length		Surface
Direction	ft	m	Surface
18/36	5,249	1,600	Asphalt

Vastrap (Stand firm) is a small military airfield situated in the Kalahari Desert north east of Upington inside a 700 square kilometre weapons test range of the same name belonging to the South African National Defence Force. It was constructed to allow the SAAF to practice tactical bombing operations, and for aircraft to service the SADF's defunct underground nuclear weapon test site.

== Atomic testing ==
The area was selected for nuclear weapons testing due to its remoteness, low population density, stable geological formations and lack of underground rivers.

Two underground shafts 385 metres (1,263 ft) and 216 metres (709 ft) in depth and 1 metre (3.3 ft) in diameter were drilled from 1975–1977. Neither was ever used to perform a detonation, although instrumented tests were performed. The shafts were sealed with sand and concrete under the supervision of the International Atomic Energy Agency in July 1993.

== Detection ==
The site was first detected by the Soviet spy satellite, Cosmos 922 when it photographed the area from 21–25 July 1977, and reported to the Americans on 6 August, who in turn confirmed its existence with an overflight of the Lockheed SR-71 spy plane. The US then applied pressure on the South Africans for it to be closed; France also insisted on closure, threatening cancellation of the Koeberg nuclear power station contract.

David Albright reported that South African officials believed that an attempt to re-use the site in the late 1980s was detected by Western or Soviet intelligence agencies, and that this discovery influenced the Tripartite Accord. In an effort to mask activities, a shed was built over one of the shafts, and the water that was pumped out in preparation for a test was hauled away.

== Airstrip ==
The airfield is operated by AFB Bloemspruit.

== See also ==
- South Africa and weapons of mass destruction
