= Mpumi Mpofu =

South African politician

Mpumi Mpofu Nompumelelo Zandile Hycynthia Mpofu (born 8 May 1966) is the CEO of the Airports Company South Africa (ACSA). Previously she served as director general in the Department of Planning, Monitoring and Evaluation in the Presidency, as well as director general in the Departments of Defence, Transport and Housing.
