= South African Express =

Regional airline of South Africa (1994–2020)

IATA	ICAO	Call sign
XZ	EXY	EXPRESSWAYS
- Founded: 24 April 1994
- Ceased operations: 28 April 2020
- Hubs: O. R. Tambo International Airport
- Frequent-flyer program: Voyager
- Alliance: Star Alliance (affiliate; 2006–2020)
- Fleet size: 24
- Destinations: 9
- Parent company: Government of South Africa
- Headquarters: O.R. Tambo International Airport; Kempton Park, Gauteng, South Africa
- Key people: Siza Mzimela (acting CEO); Mpho Selepe (CFO)
- Employees: 800
- Website: www.flyexpress.aero

South African Express Airways SOC Ltd, known as South African Express or simply SA Express, was a state-owned airline based in South Africa that started operations on 24 April 1994, but had to cease operations on 28 April 2020. Although the airline was operationally independent of South African Airways, its flights were incorporated within the strategic alliance with South African Airways. The airline had its head office at Airways Park, Jones Road, next to O.R. Tambo International Airport in Kempton Park, Ekurhuleni, Gauteng.

== History ==
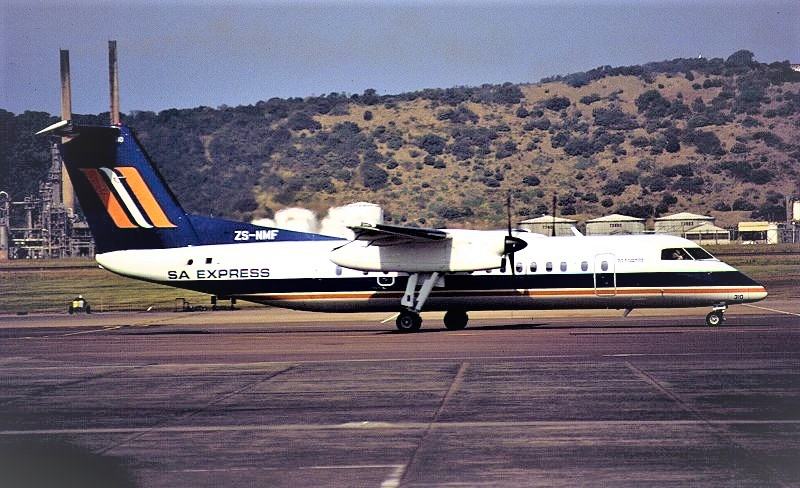
A former SA Express Bombardier Dash 8-Q300 in old colors

On 24 May 2018 the South African Civil Aviation Authority grounded the airline citing serious safety risks. Flights resumed on 23 August, following the issuance of airworthiness certificates for a portion of the airline's fleet.

On 13 February 2020, South African Express entered the Business Rescue process, a local form of bankruptcy protection. On 18 March 2020, the airline suspended all operations due to the COVID-19 pandemic. On 28 April 2020, the business rescue practitioners submitted an application to the Pretoria High Court for the liquidation of the airline. The court approved a provisional liquidation, with stakeholders being given until 9 June 2020 to voice objections before a final dissolution of the company.

In November 2020, the moveable assets of the company such as the eight Bombardiers, spare parts and furniture were to be sold via an online auction managed by GoIndustry DoveBid Africa. The non-moveable assets such as the routes, landing rights and existing licences would be sold to FlySax, a consortium consisting of a key investor and ex-SA Express staff.

== Corporate affairs ==
=== Ownership ===
The holding company is Flymodernark (Proprietary) Limited.

=== Business trends ===
South African Express is loss-making, and its accounts have been qualified by the auditors since 2012/13; the 2016/17 accounts remain unaudited (as at July 2019) and have been subject to parliamentary questions. Figures that had been made available were disputed, and the previously published accounts were withdrawn in November 2011 after accounting errors that dated back several years were discovered. Some fuller reports have been published since then, although figures are frequently restated in the following year's Report. Available figures (for years ending 31 March) are:

	2009	2010	2011	2012	2013	2014	2015	2016	2017
Turnover (Rm)	1,857	n/a	1,640	2,022	2,296	2,562	2,594	2,391	2,310
Net profit/loss after tax (Rm)	*		−186.9	−365.9	0.7	−10.0	−169.4	16.9	−234.0
Number of employees (at year end)	839	n/a	1,026	1,090	1,136	1,188	1,127	1,036	
Number of passengers (m)	1.5		1.4	1.6	1.5	1.5	1.4	1.3	
Passenger load factor (%)	67		64	61	65	65	62	64	
Number of aircraft (at year end)	n/a			24	24		24	22	
Notes/sources									Unaudited

Notes: Profitability figures for 2008/09 are not shown above(*), as they are believed to have been restated since the publication of the Annual Report. Revised figures for 2010/11 are from press reports in April 2013; the financial statements for 2012/13, 2013/14, 2014/15 and 2015/16 were audited, but received a qualified audit opinion.

== Destinations ==
South African Express served the following destinations (as of January 2020): All flights had been suspended by 18 April 2020.

Botswana

- Gaborone – Sir Seretse Khama International Airport

Democratic Republic of the Congo

- Lubumbashi – Lubumbashi International Airport

Namibia

- Walvis Bay – Walvis Bay International Airport

South Africa

- Bloemfontein – Bram Fischer International Airport
- Cape Town – Cape Town International Airport
- Durban – King Shaka International Airport
- Hoedspruit – Eastgate Airport
- Johannesburg – O.R. Tambo International Airport Hub
- Kimberley – Kimberley Airport
- Port Elizabeth - Port Elizabeth International Airport

== Fleet ==
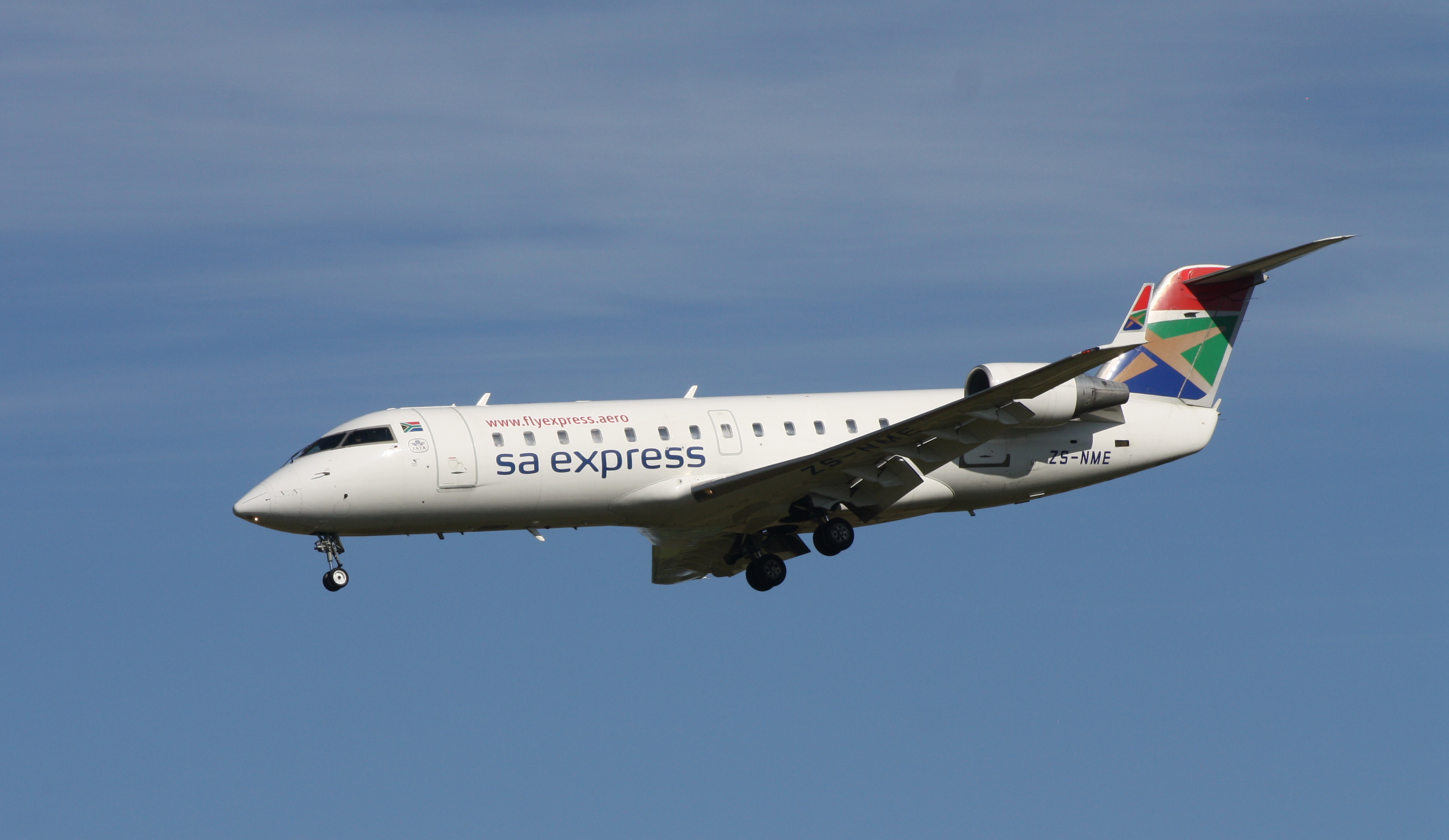
SA Express Bombardier CRJ200

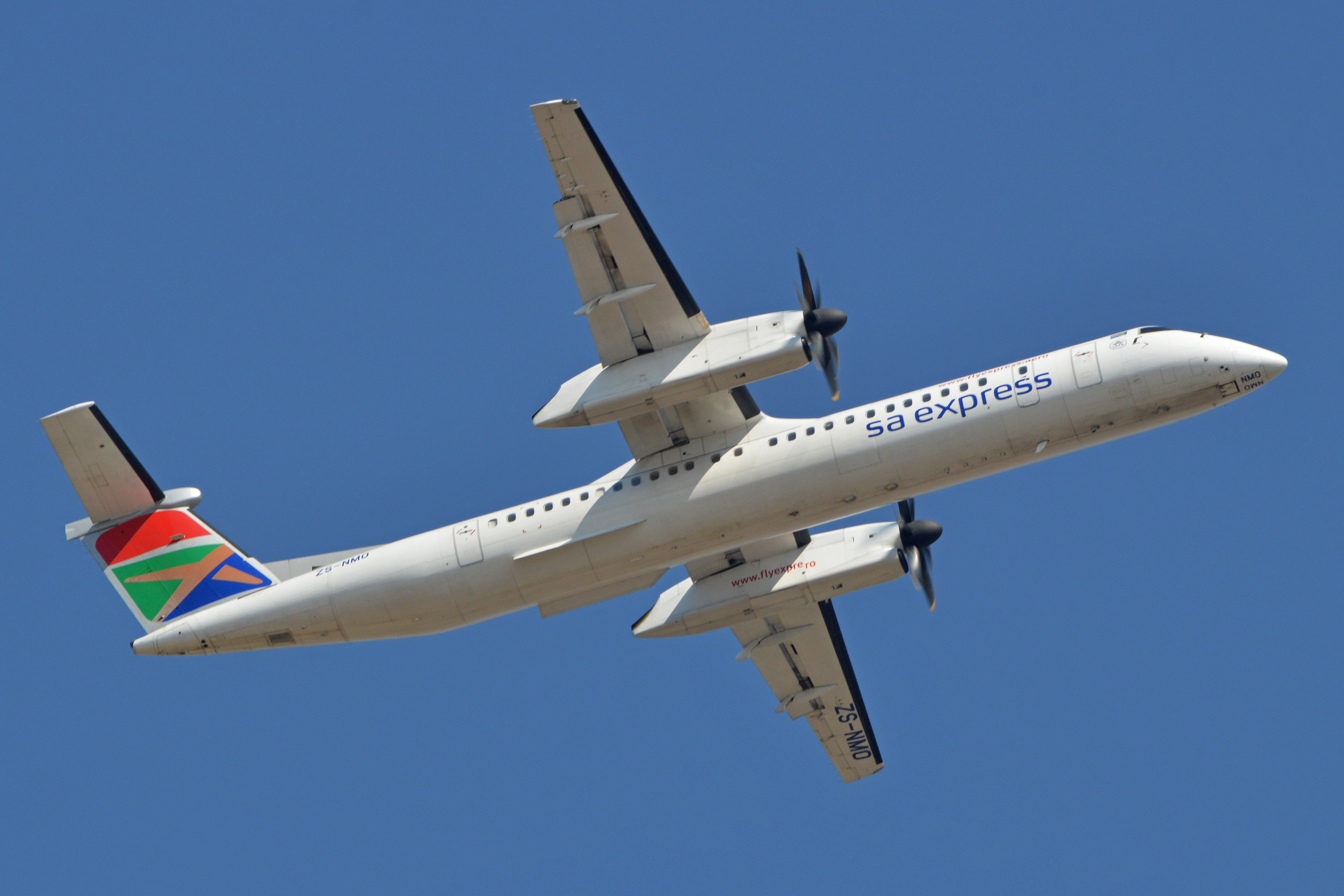
SA Express Bombardier Q400

=== Current fleet ===
The South African Express fleet consisted of the following aircraft as of February 2020:

Aircraft	In service	Orders	Passengers	Notes
Bombardier CRJ200	10	—	50	
Bombardier CRJ700	4	—	70	
Bombardier Q400	10	—	74	
Total	24	0		

=== Historical fleet ===
The airline fleet previously included the following aircraft:

- Bombardier Q300.

== See also ==
- South African Airways
- Congo Express
