= Congo Express =

Airline of the Democratic Republic of the Congo

| IATA | ICAO | Call sign |
|---|---|---|
| XZ | EXY | EXPRESSWAYS |
- Founded: 2010
- Commenced operations: 1 February 2010
- Ceased operations: 2015
- Fleet size: 2
- Destinations: 2
- Parent company: BizAfrika Congo, SA Express
- Headquarters: Lubumbashi, DRC
- Key people: Didier Kindambu (Managing Director)
- Website: www.flyexpress.aero/congo/

Congo Express was a regional airline in the Democratic Republic of the Congo created through a joint venture with airlines South African Express and BizAfrika Congo. The airline's long-term strategy was to transform air transport in the region, stimulate markets and economic growth in mining and other growth sectors, develop hubs, and provide important links between lucrative destinations.

== History ==
Congo Express was the first domestic airline in the Democratic Republic of Congo (DRC). It commenced operations on 1 February 2010, operating seven days a week and on three routes flying out of Kinshasa, and multiple routes out of South Africa into Lubumbashi. The airline operations leveraged the South African platform, and under the managing director Didier Kindambu, flourished into a regional airline serving the business and diplomatic communities. The business community in DRC had access to Lubumbashi within a few hours; it previously took 3-4 days to reach this region on dilapidated roads.

== Destinations ==
- Kinshasa - N'djili Airport
- Lubumbashi - Lubumbashi International Airport, base

== Fleet ==
The Congo Express fleet consisted of the following aircraft as of April 2012:

Congo Express fleet
| Aircraft | In fleet | Passengers | Notes |
|---|---|---|---|
| Bombardier CRJ200ER | 2 | 50 | Leased from South African Express |

== See also ==
- List of airlines of the Democratic Republic of the Congo
- South African Express
