= Eswatini Airlink =

Airline of Eswatini

| IATA | ICAO | Call sign |
|---|---|---|
| 4Z | SZL | SWAZILINK |
- Founded: 1999; 27 years ago (as Swaziland Airlink)
- Ceased operations: 1 June 2022; 3 years ago
- Hubs: King Mswati III International Airport
- Focus cities: O. R. Tambo International Airport
- Fleet size: 0
- Destinations: 2
- Parent company: Airlink
- Headquarters: Matsapha, Eswatini
- Website: flyeswatiniairlink.com

Eswatini Airlink was a regional airline based in Matsapha, Eswatini, and was the flag carrier of that country.

== History ==
Eswatini Airlink was formed as a joint venture company between the Swaziland Government (60%) and Airlink (40%) to take over operations from Royal Swazi National Airways Corporation (RSNAC), the previous flag carrier of Eswatini. Swaziland Airlink started operations in July 1999 with a leased Fokker F28 aircraft from RSNAC linking Matsapha Airport with Johannesburg and Dar-es-Salaam.

In June 2000, the Fokker F28 was replaced with a BAe Jetstream 41 aircraft. Swaziland Airlink became Eswatini Airlink after the country's name was changed.

The airline ceased operations on June 1, 2022.

== Destinations ==
Eswatini Airlink served the following destinations as part of Airlink:

| Country | City | Airport | Notes | Refs |
|---|---|---|---|---|
| Eswatini | Manzini | King Mswati III International Airport | Hub | |
| Eswatini | Manzini | Matsapha Airport | Terminated | |
| South Africa | Johannesburg | O. R. Tambo International Airport | | |

== Fleet ==
Eswatini Airlink did not maintain a dedicated fleet at the time of closure. Flights were operated under Airlink's AOC as part of the Airlink schedule using Embraer ERJ-135 or Embraer ERJ-140 aircraft. Eswatini Airlink previously operated the BAe Jetstream 41, Fokker F28, and Embraer ERJ-135 under their own AOC.
