= Upington Airport =

Airport in Northern Cape, South Africa

Upington International Airport Upington Internasionale Lughawe
- IATA: UTN; ICAO: FAUP

Summary
- Airport type: Public (International for Cargo only)
- Owner/Operator: Airports Company South Africa
- Serves: Upington, Dawid Kruiper Local Municipality, Northern Cape
- Opened: 1968
- Elevation AMSL: 851 m / 2,791 ft
- Coordinates: 28°24′04″S 21°15′35″E
- Website: airports.co.za

Map
- Location of Airport in Northern Cape

Runways
Direction	Length		Surface
Direction	m	ft	Surface
17/35	4,900	16,076	Asphalt
01/19	2,438	7,998	Asphalt
08/26	834	2,736	Asphalt

Statistics (FY2025–26)
- Passengers: 62,653
- Aircraft movements: 5,555
- Sources: ACSA, SACAA

Upington International Airport (IATA: UTN, ICAO: FAUP) is an airport located in Upington, Northern Cape, South Africa. At 4,900 metres (16,100 ft), runway 17/35 is one of the longest runways in the world. The high elevation of the airport, extremely high summer temperatures and the fact that it was designed for the Boeing 747 necessitated the extreme length of the main runway.

== History ==
With the fall of the Portuguese regime in Angola, South African Airways lost its landing rights in Luanda. In addition to restrictions to overflying African states, there was concern that the country would lose its landing rights at the Ivory Coast and Ilha do Sal, Cape Verde.

Upington Airport's runway was built to accommodate a Boeing 747 with a full load of passengers, cargo and fuel, so that it could take off for Europe without having to stop along the way. Upington was chosen because of its strategic position, availability of land and comparatively lower height above sea level than Johannesburg.

Upington Airport was opened in 1968 as Pierre van Ryneveld Airport. In 1974, a corrugated iron fire station was erected but this structure was converted into administrative offices for airport management and other administrative staff in 1996 and the fire station was relocated.

From August 1976 to December 1982, South African Airways made use of Upington as a refuelling station for two weekly scheduled Boeing 747 flights to London and Zürich.

The Concorde did flight testing at Upington Airport in June 1976.

As of 2006, Upington Airport was to be developed into a major cargo hub that will serve sub-Saharan Africa directly from South Africa's Northern Cape Province.

As of 2009, planning was also under way at Upington Airport to construct a facility for the long-term parking of mothballed (decommissioned) aircraft.

As well as improvements to the airport itself, ACSA has built a solar farm located on 0.66 hectares of land within the airport precinct, capable of producing 500 kW during peak production each year.

== Airlines and destinations ==
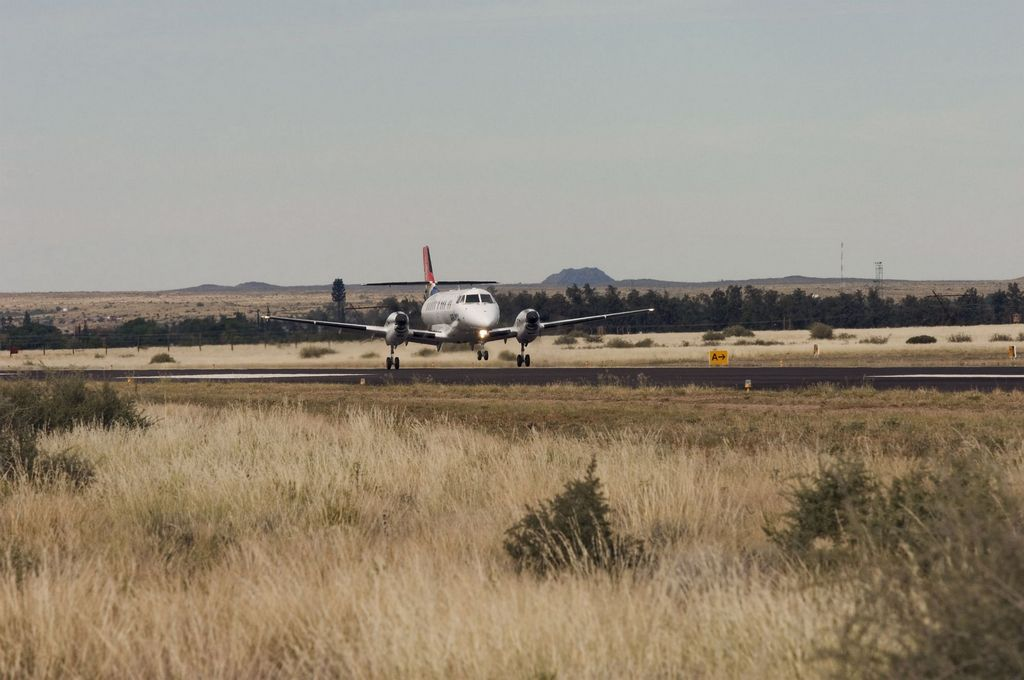
Aircraft at Upington Airport

Airlines	Destinations
Airlink	Cape Town, Johannesburg–O. R. Tambo

Destinations Map

== Non-scheduled services ==
Upington Airport serves as an international cargo hub. Most flights are non-scheduled chartered flights operating in the months of November to January to export grapes from the region directly to Europe and other countries. As much as 1,000,000 tonnes of grapes are exported every year.

Many major car manufacturers bring their cars and commercial vehicles to Upington to test them in the hot dry and sunny conditions, when there is winter in Europe. These cars and test teams are flown into and out of Upington Airport using chartered planes. Cars used the N14 between Pofadder and Kakamas. The road has a speed limit of 250 kilometres per hour (160 mph) for authorized vehicles.

== Airport services and capacity ==
Services at Upington Airport include:

- One terminal building (combined arrival and departure hall)
- Information desk
- Conference room accommodating up to 12 persons
- Five different car rental companies
- Public parking for up to 58 cars
- Basic first aid facilities
- Aircraft parking bays: 20

Flying services include:

- Control tower (frequency 121.30)
- Apron services (frequency 122.65)
- Refuelling service by Engen Aviation providing Avgas and Jet-A1
- General aviation area including parking
- VOR and RNAV instrument approach procedure for runway 35
- Runway centreline lights, end lights, edge lights and PAPI for runways 01/19 and 17/35
- Runway 08/26 only to be used for taxi purposes at night and during IMC
- Fire and rescue services (CAT 5), upgrade-able to CAT 8 with 7 days prior notice
- Upington Weather Office
- The airport has cargo services to and from Leipzig with AirBridge Cargo (Boeing 747-8F)

== Statistics ==
Annual passenger and aircraft statistics
Fiscal Year (Apr–Mar)	Aircraft movements	Passenger traffic
2012–13	8,072	55,726
2013–14	9,745(▲20.7%)	65,387(▲17.3%)
2014–15	9,292(▼4.6%)	74,297(▲13.6%)
2015–16	10,574(▲13.8%)	68,800(▼7.4%)
2016–17	12,924(▲22.2%)	65,292(▼5.1%)
2017–18	7,319(▼43.4%)	66,974(▲2.6%)
2018–19	7,163(▼2.1%)	62,499(▼6.7%)
2019–20	6,175(▼13.8%)	52,873(▼15.4%)
2020–21	2,704(▼56.2%)	10,894(▼79.4%)
2021–22	4,278(▲58.2%)	29,249(▲168.5%)
2022–23	5,691(▲33.0%)	49,818(▲70.3%)
2023–24	5,965(▲4.8%)	53,740(▲7.9%)
2024–25	5,820(▼2.4%)	56,881(▲5.8%)
2025–26	5,555(▼4.6%)	62,653(▲10.2%)
Source: ACSA

== See also ==
- List of airports in South Africa
- List of South African airports by passenger movements
- Airports Company South Africa
