= Pietermaritzburg Airport =

Pietermaritzburg Airport Pietermaritzburg Lughawe
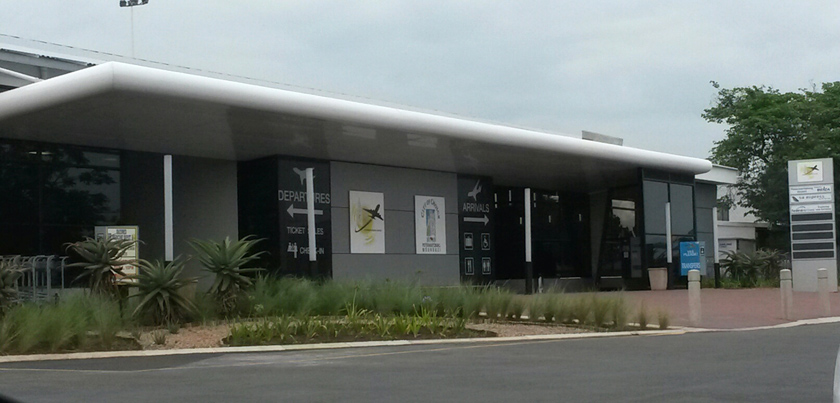
- IATA: PZB; ICAO: FAPM

Summary
- Airport type: Public
- Owner: Msunduzi Local Municipality
- Operator: Airports Company South Africa
- Serves: Pietermaritzburg, South Africa; Midlands, South Africa
- Location: 2 Pharazyn Way, Oribi, Pietermaritzburg, South Africa
- Elevation AMSL: 2,423 ft (739 m)
- Coordinates: 29°38′48″S 30°23′54″E

Map
- Location of Airport in KwaZulu-Natal PZB (South Africa) PZB (Africa)

Runways
Direction	Length		Surface
Direction	ft	m	Surface
16/34	5,043	1,537	Asphalt

Pietermaritzburg Airport (IATA: PZB, ICAO: FAPM) is the primary airport serving the city of Pietermaritzburg and surrounding areas, including the Midlands and the outer west areas of Durban. Pietermaritzburg Airport is the only airport in the greater Pietermaritzburg area that offers scheduled passenger services. In 2013 the terminal building and apron were upgraded.

In 2020, Pietermaritzburg Airport was one of the few airports authorised to open for domestic travel by the South African government in relation to the relaxing of COVID-19 lockdown measures.

== Airline and destination ==
Airlines	Destinations
Airlink	Johannesburg–O. R. Tambo

== Aeronautical information ==
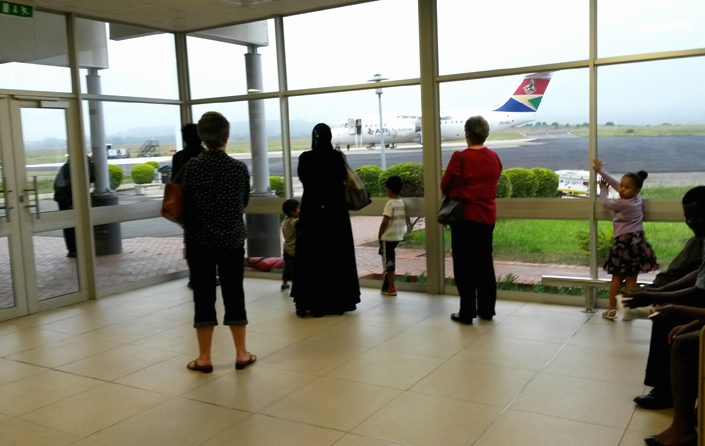
View of an Airlink aircraft from the arrivals area

=== Navigational aids ===
Type	Identification	Frequency
NDB	OBI	280
NDB	ORI	441.74
NDB	PU	407
NDB	PZ	257
VOR	PMV	117.9

=== Communication ===
- Communication frequency 122.0 MHz

=== Notes ===
The airport has Pilot Controlled night landing facilities. The lights are normally off and are switched on for a period of 15 minutes when Aircrew transmit 5 or 7 clicks in rapid succession on the communication frequency, depending on the intensity required (30% or 100%). Cloud break procedures are authorised on runways 16 and 34, the procedures are fairly complicated due to the hilly terrain surrounding the airport.

== Other activities at the airfield ==
There is an aero-club on the airfield, the Pietermaritzburg Aero Club.

== Traffic statistics ==
Annual passenger traffic for Pietermaritzburg Airport
Year	Passengers	% Change
2010	59,199	▼2.0%
2011	95,875	▲62.0%
2012	102,688	▲7.1%
2013	109,897	▲7.0%
2014	125,836	▲14.5%
2015	129,848	▲3.2%
