= Polokwane International Airport =

Airport in South Africa

Polokwane International Airport Polokwane Internasionale Lughawe
- IATA: PTG; ICAO: FAPP

Summary
- Airport type: Public
- Serves: Polokwane (Pietersburg), South Africa
- Elevation AMSL: 4,076 ft / 1,242 m
- Coordinates: 23°50′43″S 29°27′31″E

Map
- Location of Airport in Limpopo PTG (South Africa) PTG (Africa)

Runways
Direction	Length		Surface
Direction	ft	m	Surface
01/19	8,400	2,560	Asphalt
05/23	7,612	2,320	Asphalt
- Source: WorldAeroData.com

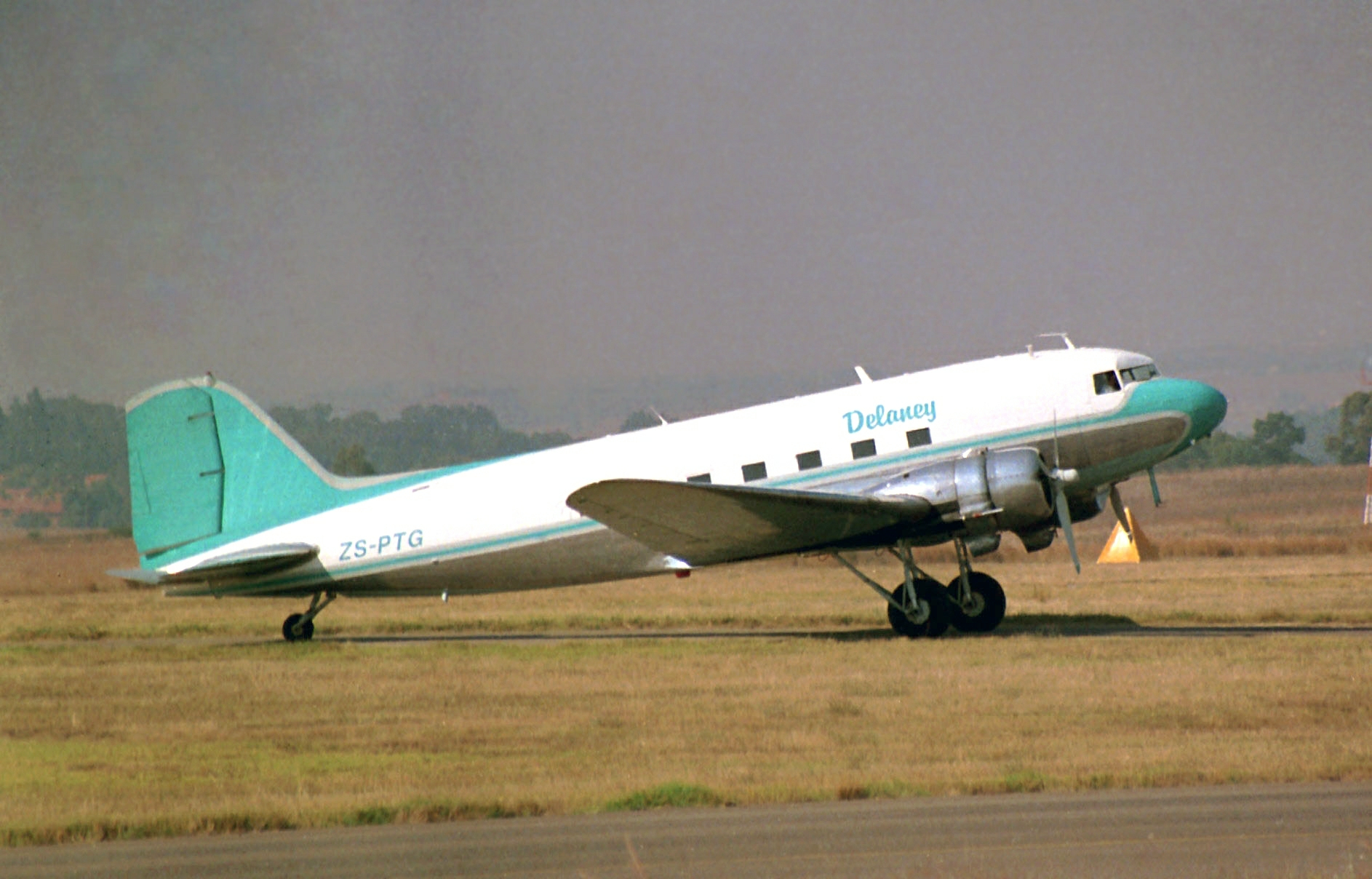

Polokwane International Airport (IATA: PTG, ICAO: FAPP) (Afrikaans: Polokwane Internasionale Lughawe), is an airport serving the city of Polokwane (known until 2005 as Pietersburg) in the South African province of Limpopo. The airport is located 5 km north of the city. It is not to be confused with the nearby Pietersburg Civil Aerodrome (ICAO: FAPI).

== Overview ==
It opened in March 1996 on the site of a former air force base (which had the ICAO code FAPB). It was formerly known as "Gateway International Airport". It is owned by Gateway Airports Authority Limited, owned by the Limpopo Provincial Government to manage all public airports in Limpopo.

In April 2021 the South African Civil Aviation Authority downgraded the airport's license category due to inadequate provision of safety services for scheduled commercial flights. Consequently Airlink suspended their flights. The airport has scheduled flights to Johannesburg, with five flights on weekdays, one flight on Saturday and two on Sunday. As of 2010, it handled approximately 8,000 aircraft and 58,700 passengers per year.

Polokwane International Airport is back in full operation. Since March 2023, the Airport has three flights a day during weekdays and two over the weekend between Polokwane and Johannesburg.

== Airlines and destinations ==
Airlines	Destinations
Airlink	Johannesburg–O. R. Tambo
