= Airports Company South Africa =

South African airport management company

Airports Company of South Africa
- Type: Private; State-owned enterprise
- Industry: Aviation
- Founded: 1993; 33 years ago
- Headquarters: O.R. Tambo Int'l Airport; Kempton Park, Gauteng, South Africa
- Key people: Sandile Nogxina (Chairman); Mpumi Mpofu (CEO)
- Services: Airport management
- Revenue: ▲ R 7.89 billion (2025)
- Net income: ▲ R 1.13 billion (2025)
- Total assets: ▼ R 32.02 billion (2025)
- Total equity: ▲ R 19.93 billion (2025)
- Number of employees: 3,731 (2024)
- Website: www.airports.co.za

Airports Company of South Africa Limited (ACSA) is a majority state-owned South African airport management company, with 94.6% being owned by the state. Founded in 1993, ACSA operates nine of South Africa's airports. The company is headquartered at Aviation Park, Western Precinct Building, situated at O.R. Tambo International Airport in Kempton Park, Gauteng, South Africa.

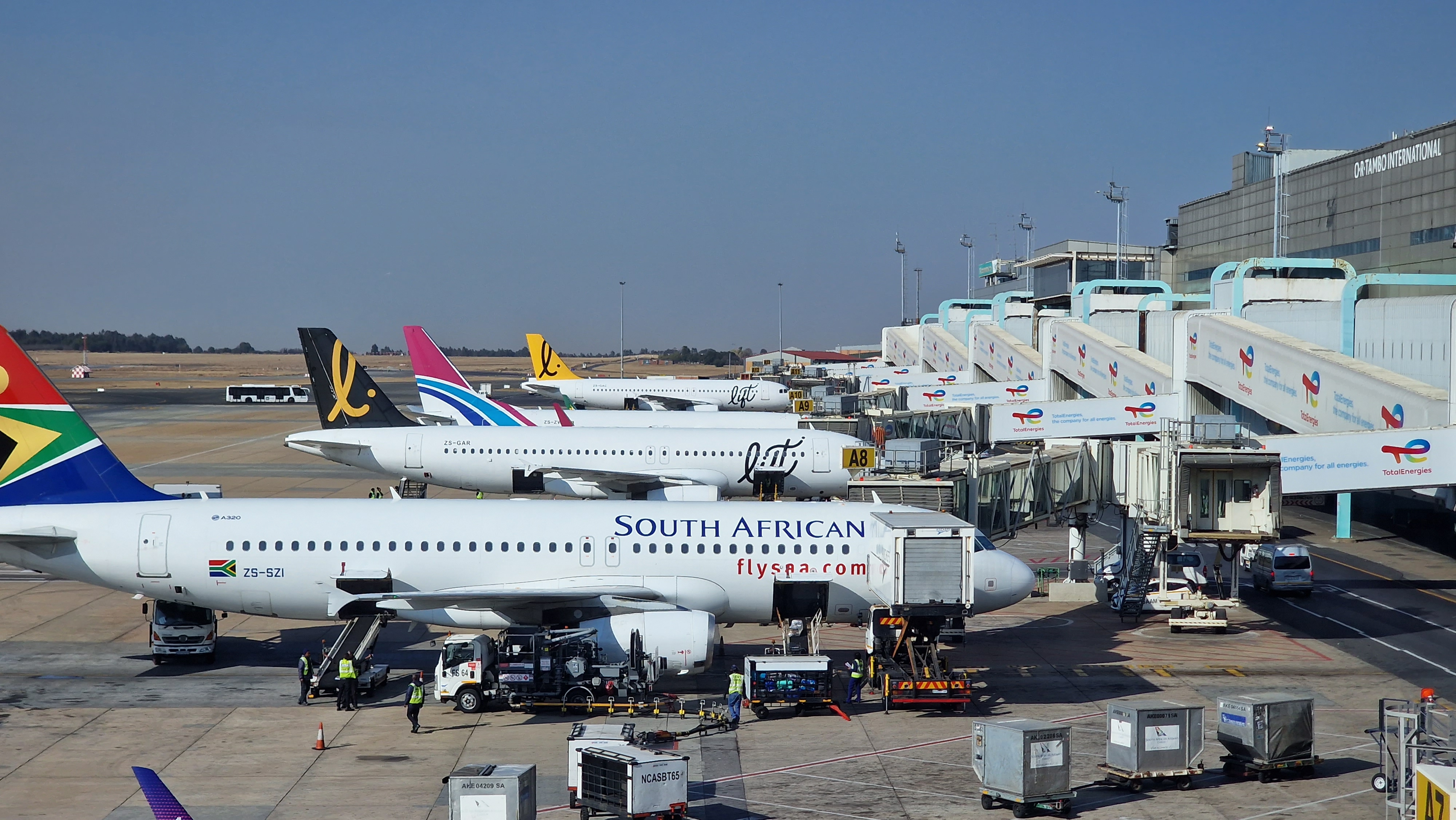
Multiple commercial aircraft parked at jet bridges at O.R. Tambo International Airport, an airport owned by ACSA.

== History ==
All of South Africa's airports used to be owned and operated by the state until 23 July 1993, when nine airports were reassigned to ACSA. ACSA was then owned by the South African Government through the Department of Transport.

In 1998, Aeroporti di Roma bought 20% of ACSA's shares for R819 million. In 2005, the Public Investment Corporation, bought the 20% shares back from the Italian group.

In 2006, ACSA was part of a consortium that won the bid to manage the Chhatrapati Shivaji International Airport in Mumbai, India.

In 2012, ACSA signed a 20-year concession agreement to manage the São Paulo–Guarulhos International Airport in Brazil, a strategic alliance between two countries that organized the soccer world cup in recent years. The deal was signed through a consortium including Brazil's Invepar for 51% of the concession and at a cost of $9.2 billion.

In May 2016, ACSA finished installing a solar power plant near the Kimberley Airport as part of a broader plan to install solar farms in all of its regional airports.

== Airports ==
The following international airports are operated by ACSA:

- O.R. Tambo International Airport
- Cape Town International Airport
- King Shaka International Airport
- Bram Fischer International Airport
- Upington International Airport
- Chief Dawid Stuurman International Airport
- São Paulo Guarulhos International Airport, Brazil
- Chhatrapati Shivaji Maharaj International Airport, Mumbai, India (consortium with Bidvest and Airports Authority of India)

The following local airports are operated by ACSA:

- King Phalo Airport
- George Airport
- Kimberley Airport
- Mthatha Airport

== Armed cash heist at OR Tambo ==
On 25 March 2006 gunmen armed with AK-47s stole bags containing several million US dollars at O.R. Tambo International Airport. Three ACSA employees and six other individuals were arrested and appeared in court in connection with the heist.
