= Vilankulo Airport =

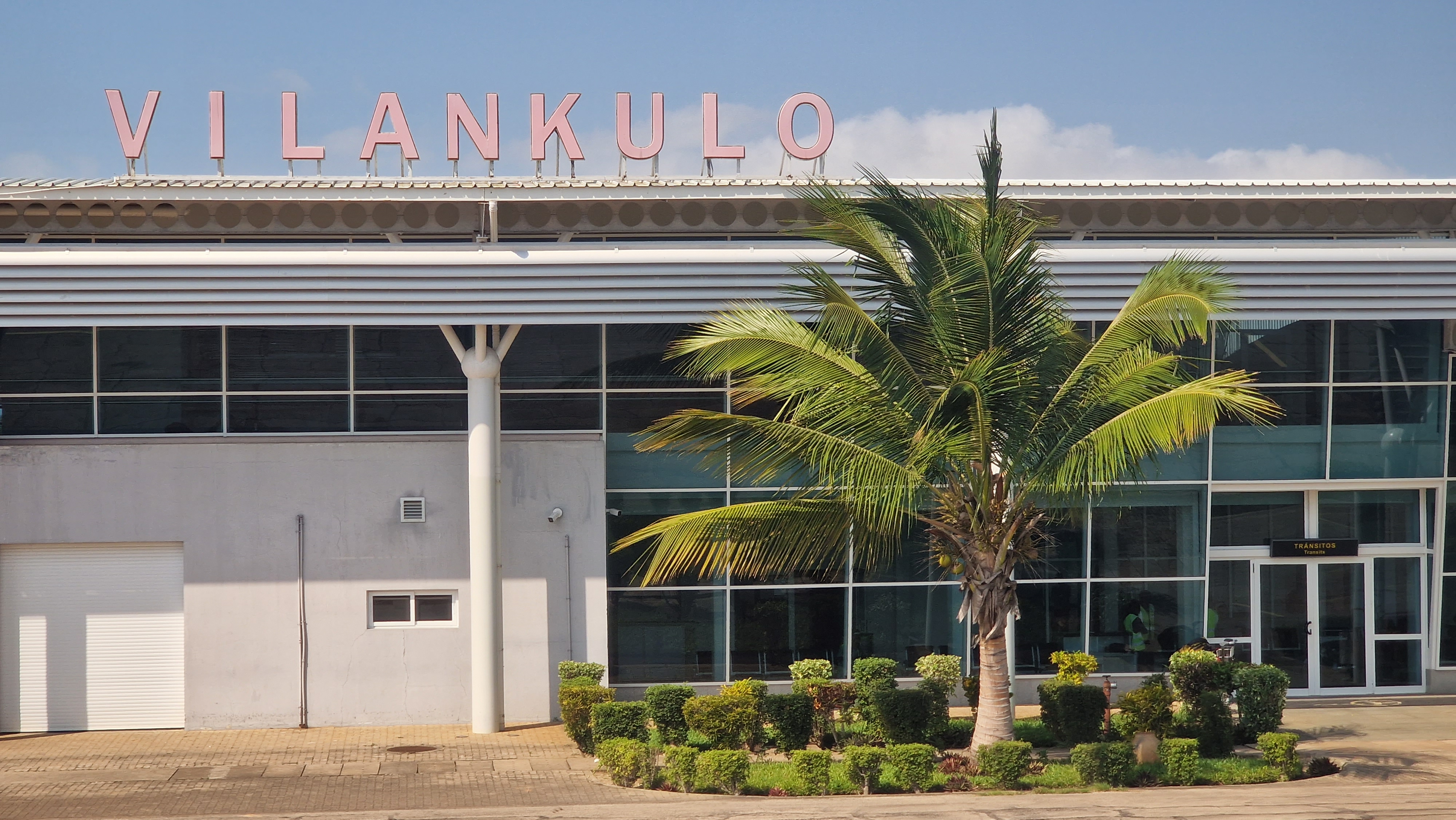
- IATA: VNX; ICAO: FQVL

Summary
- Airport type: Public
- Operator: Aeroportos de Mocambique (Mozambique Airports Company)
- Serves: Vilankulo
- Location: Vilankulo, Mozambique
- Elevation AMSL: 46 ft / 12 m
- Coordinates: 22°01′06.35″S 35°18′47.87″E

Map
- Location of airport in Mozambique

Runways
Direction	Length		Surface
Direction	m	ft	Surface
10/28	734	2,461	Asphalt
17/35	1,439	4,823	Asphalt

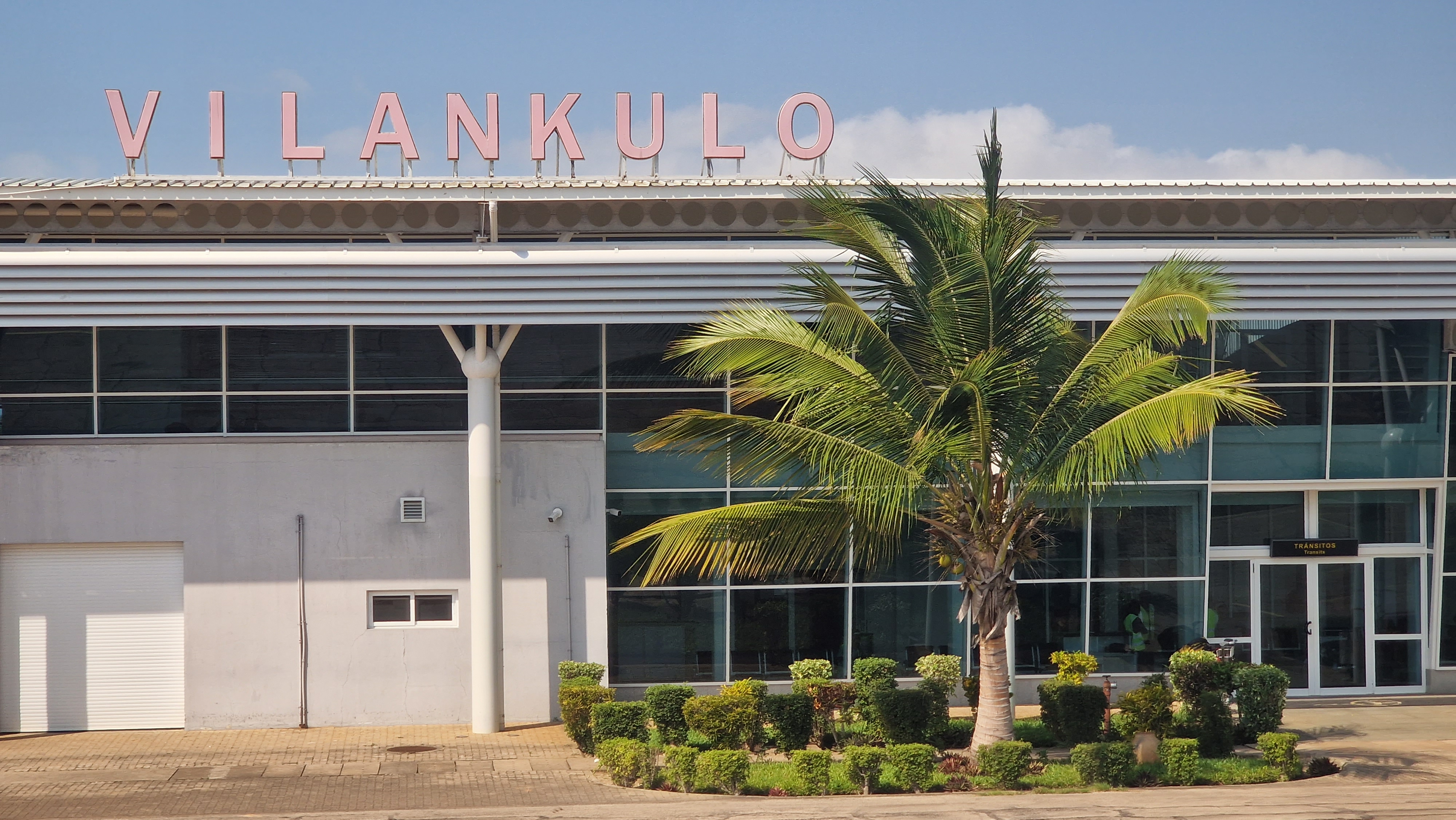
Vilankulo Airport terminal building, Mozambique.

Vilankulo Airport (IATA: VNX, ICAO: FQVL) is an airport in Mozambique that serves the city of Vilankulo in the Inhambane Province.

== Modernisation ==
In 2009 a Chinese company called Anhui Foreign Economic Construction Group began construction work on the airport with an estimated cost of US$9 million to refurbish, expand and modernize the airport. The new terminal building was inaugurated on 13 April 2011 by Mozambican President Armando Guebuza. The modern air-conditioned International airport will make it possible for larger aircraft to access the airport and use the facilities. Since the expansion of the passenger terminal it has a capacity of 200,000 passengers, up from its previous 75,000 capacity.

== Airlines and destinations ==
Airlines	Destinations
Airlink	Johannesburg–O. R. Tambo, Mbombela
LAM Mozambique Airlines	Inhambane, Johannesburg–O. R. Tambo, Maputo
