= Mthatha Airport =

Mthatha Airport Mthatha Lughawe
- IATA: UTT; ICAO: FAUT

Summary
- Airport type: Public
- Operator: Provincial Government
- Serves: Mthatha, King Sabata Dalindyebo Local Municipality, Eastern Cape, South Africa
- Elevation AMSL: 2,429 ft / 740 m
- Coordinates: 31°32′47″S 028°40′31″E

Map
- Location of the airport in the Eastern Cape FAUT (South Africa) FAUT (Africa)

Runways
Direction	Length		Surface
Direction	m	ft	Surface
14/32	2,600	8,530	Asphalt
- Sources: South African AIP, IATA

Mthatha Airport (IATA: UTT, ICAO: FAUT) is an airport serving Mthatha (formerly Umtata), a city in the Eastern Cape province of South Africa. The airport was previously named K. D. Matanzima Airport after Kaiser Matanzima, a president of the former Transkei.

== Facilities ==
The airport resides at an elevation of 2,429 feet (740 m) above mean sea level. It has one asphalt paved runway designated 14/32 which measures 2,600 by 45 metres (8,530 ft × 148 ft). Runway 14/32 was expanded from its previous size of 2,000 by 23 metres (6,562 ft × 75 ft) in 2013; previously there was also a grass runway designated 09/27 which measured 1,500 by 30 metres (4,921 ft × 98 ft).

== Military use and control ==
On 16 May 2012, the Cabinet of South Africa approved a decision to hand over the airport for use by the South African National Defence Force (SANDF). On 21 May 2012, the airport was formally handed over to Lindiwe Sisulu, then Minister of Defence, by Noxolo Kiviet, then Premier of the Eastern Cape. Sisulu said that the airport would be used for border security operations, and the SANDF would contribute towards the development of the airport thus building regional transport infrastructure.

On 7 November 2012 a C-47TP of the South African Air Force was involved in a landing accident at the airport, damaging its right wing, engine and propeller. Early reports stated that the aircraft was carrying a medical crew visiting former President Nelson Mandela at his home in Qunu. This claim was later dismissed by the SANDF.

On 5 December 2012, all 11 people on board were killed in the 2012 Drakensberg SAAF Dakota crash en route to Mthatha Airport.

In July 2013, it was reported that the military was no longer controlling the day-to-day operations of the airport. It was reported that the decision to control the airport had been rescinded by the SANDF.

Mthatha Airport was again placed under military control temporarily following the death of Nelson Mandela on 5 December 2013, as his state funeral was to be held in the nearby rural village of Qunu where he grew up. Mthatha Airport was converted into a no-fly zone reserved for heads of state attending the funeral. Other VIPs and members of the public attending the funeral were advised to fly to Port Elizabeth Airport and East London Airport instead. On 14 December 2013, Mandela's body was flown from Air Force Base Waterkloof near Pretoria to Mthatha Airport for his funeral and burial.

== Upgrades ==
In an initial phase of upgrades to the airport to improve infrastructure, an expanded 14/32 runway was completed in May 2013, allowing larger aircraft to service the airport. On 30 May 2013, an aircraft operated by SA Airlink was the first to land on the expanded runway. The new runway cost R490 million to complete.

On 22 November 2013, President Jacob Zuma visited the airport to inspect the runway upgrade. He said that planned future upgrades to the airport included a new terminal building, a new lit helipad, new runway approach lights, a new road, and upgrades to the hangars. A R200 million tender was advertised for a contractor to build a new terminal building.

On 28 January 2014, Mthatha Airport gave the Ruwacon contracting firm the task of upgrading the airport's facilities. Ruwacon is expected to construct a new passenger terminal, a rental car facility with accommodations for parking and washing vehicles, a refuelling station, a security fence, and roadways. The first phase of the airport upgrades project is expected to be completed in early 2015.

The next two phases of the airport upgrades include the addition of commercial and retail facilities, and new cargo facilities.

Flights to the airport where suspended in January 2019 due to the airport's sub-standard rescue and firefighting response times, as well as a lack of aerodrome emergency management systems.

== Airlines and destinations ==
Airlines	Destinations
Airlink	Johannesburg–O. R. Tambo
