= Kruger Mpumalanga International Airport =

Airport in Mbombela, South Africa

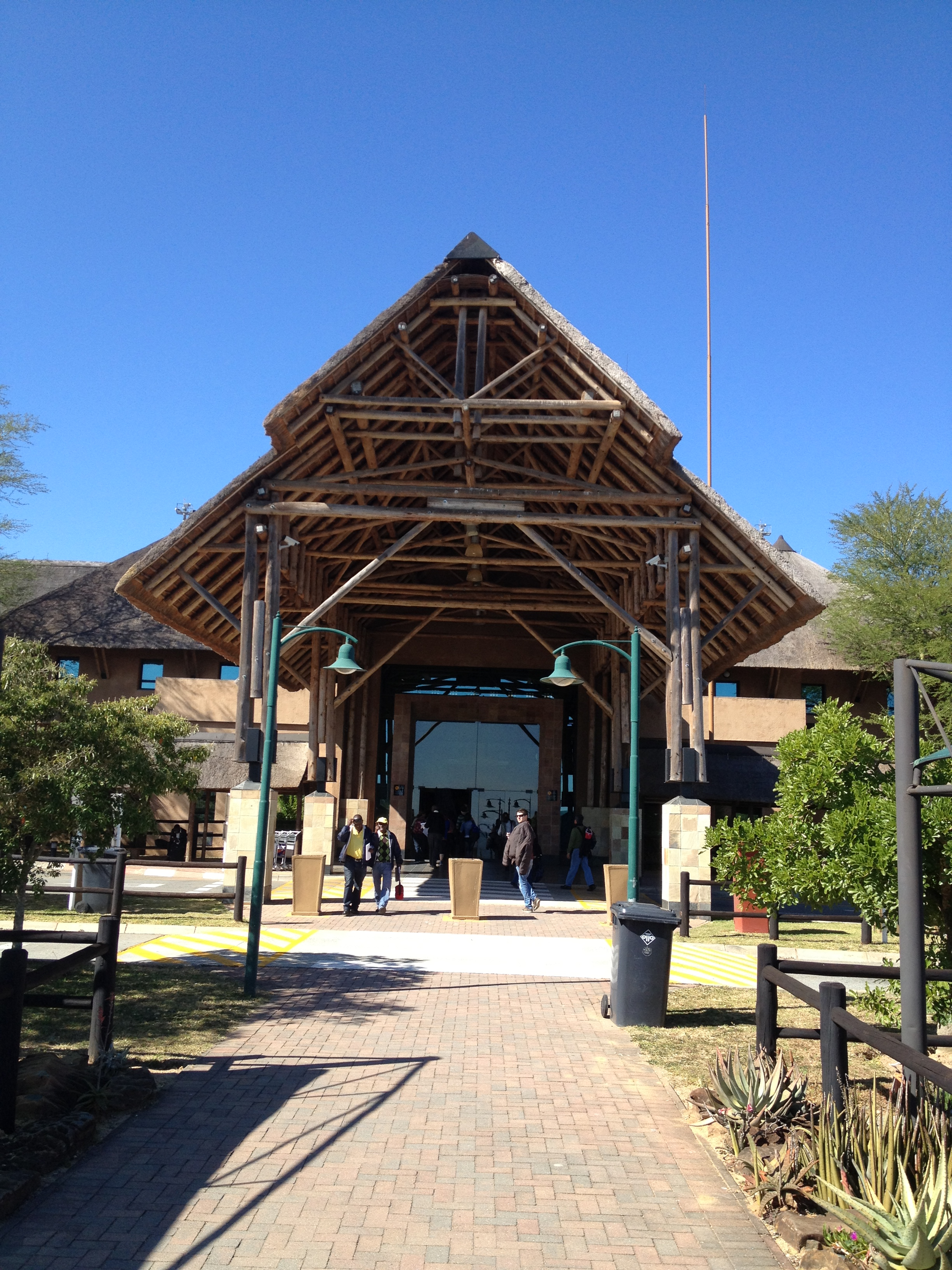
- IATA: MQP; ICAO: FAKN

Summary
- Airport type: Public
- Owner/Operator: Primkop Airport Management (Pty) Ltd.
- Serves: Mbombela, South Africa
- Location: City of Mbombela
- Opened: 21 October 2002; 23 years ago
- Hub for: Airlink; Federal Air
- Elevation AMSL: 862 m / 2,828 ft
- Coordinates: 25°23′00″S 31°06′20″E
- Website: www.kmiairport.co.za

Maps
- Interactive Map
- Location in Mpumalanga MQP (South Africa) MQP (Africa)

Runways
Direction	Length		Surface
Direction	m	ft	Surface
05/23	3,100	10,171	Asphalt

Statistics (2024)
- Passenger traffic: 314,957

Kruger Mpumalanga International Airport (IATA: MQP, ICAO: FAKN) (Afrikaans: Kruger Mpumalanga Internasionale Lughawe) is an airport located 16 km (9.9 mi), or 27 km (17 mi) by road, north east of Mbombela (formerly known as Nelspruit) in Mpumalanga, South Africa.

The airport opened on 21 October 2002, replacing the smaller Nelspruit Airport. It primarily serves tourists to Kruger National Park.

The airport terminal is almost entirely covered by a thatched roof, making it the largest thatched structure in Africa, covering approximately 7,350 m^{2} (79,100 ft^{2}).

== Operations ==
There are scheduled passenger flights to other South African cities as well as regional destinations.

From November 2022 to March 2023, German low-cost carrier Discover Airlines operated flights between it Frankfurt and Kruger Mpumalanga via Windhoek, Namibia. However, this route was terminated due to low demand.

== Airlines and destinations ==
Airlines	Destinations
Air Botswana	Kasane
Airlink	Cape Town, Durban, Johannesburg–O. R. Tambo, Livingstone, Skukuza, Victoria Falls, Vilankulo
Fastjet Zimbabwe	Victoria Falls
Federal Air	Phinda, Skukuza, Timbavati
FlySafair	Cape Town, Johannesburg–O. R. Tambo

== Statistics ==
Annual passenger traffic
Year (Jan–Dec)	Passenger traffic
2003	131,943
2004	139,573(▲5.8%)
2005	177,498(▲27.2%)
2006	215,390(▲21.3%)
2007	239,583(▲11.2%)
2008	247,573(▲3.3%)
2009	208,751(▼15.7%)
2010	239,292(▲14.6%)
2011	263,222(▲10.0%)
2012	241,949(▼8.1%)
2013	249,690(▲3.2%)
2014	253,595(▲1.6%)
2015	237,106(▼6.5%)
2016	268,717(▲13.3%)
2017	278,455(▲3.6%)
2018	271,809(▼2.4%)
2019	255,176(▼6.1%)
2020	n/a
2021	n/a
2022	n/a
2023	236,235
2024	314,957(▲33.3%)
Source: KMIA

== See also ==
- List of airports in South Africa
