= Kimberley Airport =

Kimberley Airport Kimberley Lughawe

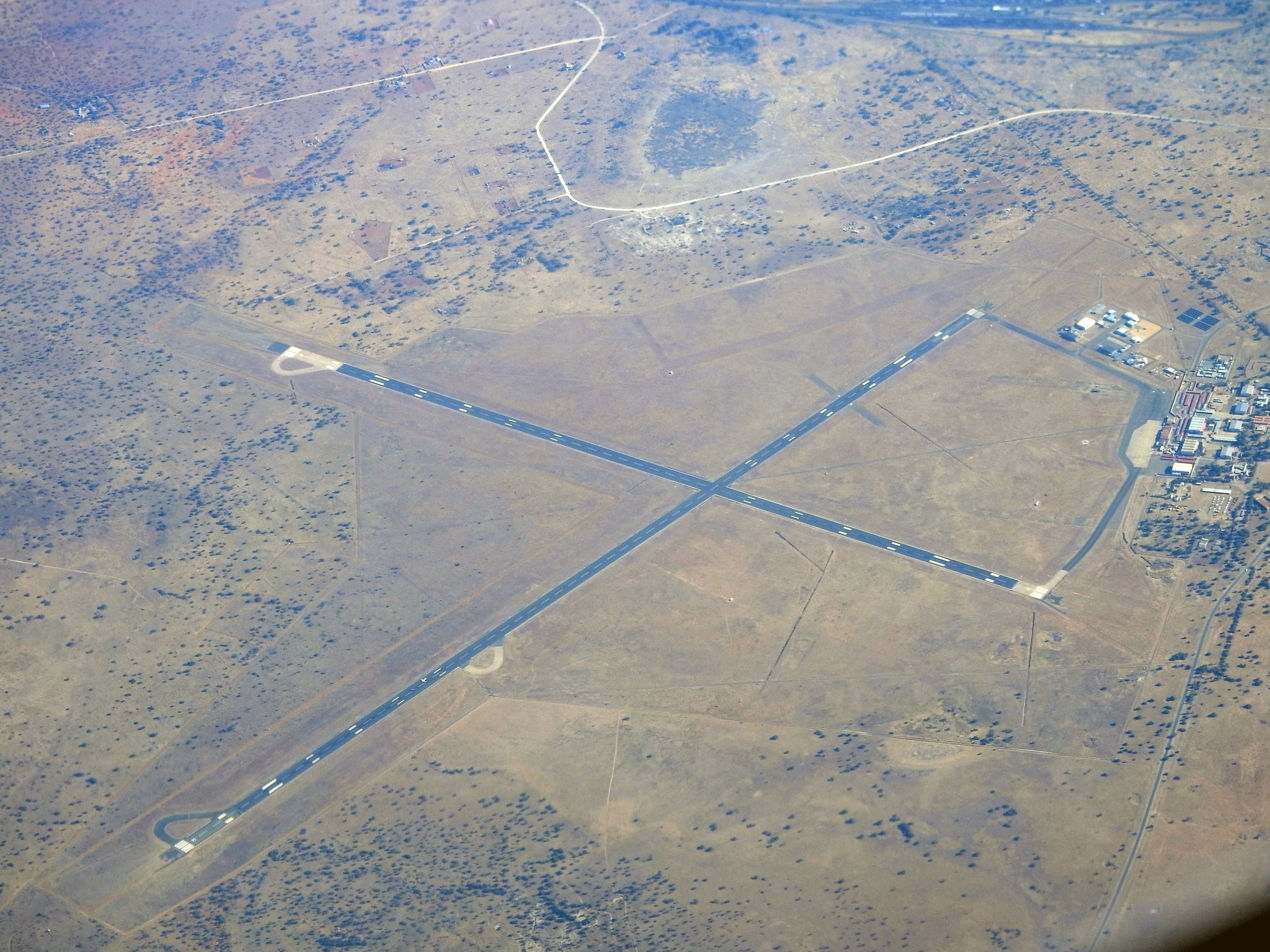
- IATA: KIM; ICAO: FAKM

Summary
- Airport type: Public
- Operator: Airports Company South Africa
- Location: Kimberley, Northern Cape, South Africa
- Elevation AMSL: 3,950 ft (1,200 m)
- Coordinates: 28°48′06″S 24°45′49″E
- Website: www.airports.co.za/airports/kimberley-airport

Maps
- Interactive Map
- Location in the Northern Cape KIM (South Africa)

Runways
Direction	Length		Surface
Direction	m	ft	Surface
02/20	3,002	9,849	Asphalt
10/28	2,437	7,995	Asphalt

Statistics (FY 2025–26)
- Passenger traffic: 170,738
- Aircraft movements: 7,419
- Sources: South African AIP, DAFIF

Kimberley Airport (IATA: KIM, ICAO: FAKM) is an airport located in the Northern Cape province that serves Kimberley, the capital city of the province and its surrounding areas.

It was established in 1912. The airport is approximately 6.5 kilometers (12 minutes) away from the centre of Kimberley. Annually, the airport handles around 170,000 passengers and 7400 flights. Airlines Airlink and CemAir provides regular domestic flights in South Africa between Cape Town International Airport and Johannesburg–O.R. Tambo International Airport.

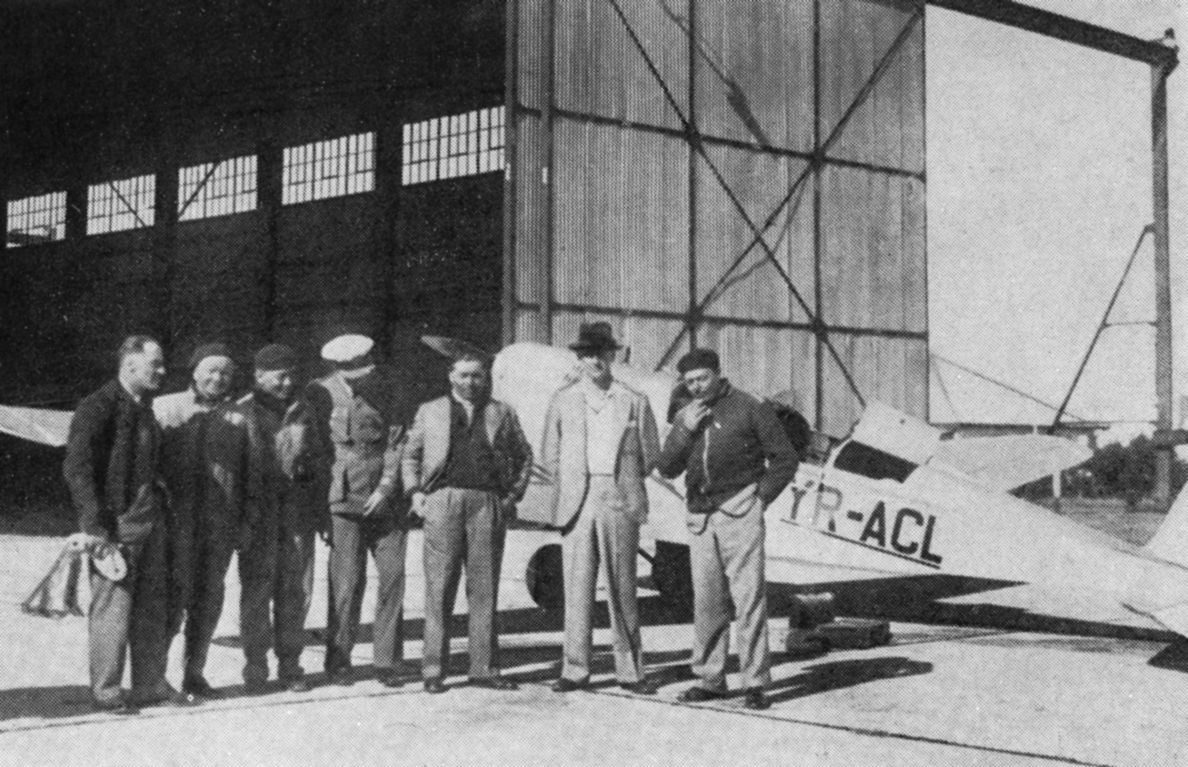
Six Romanian aviators and cpt. Fisher (airport chief, middle) at Kimberley Airport, 1935-04-24

== Facilities ==
The airport is at an elevation of 3,950 feet (1,204 m) above mean sea level. It has two asphalt paved runways: 02/20 measuring 3,002 by 46 metres (9,849 ft × 151 ft) and 10/28 measuring 2,437 by 46 metres (7,995 ft × 151 ft).

== Airlines and destinations ==
Departing for Cape Town

Airlines	Destinations
Airlink	Cape Town, Johannesburg–O. R. Tambo
CemAir	Cape Town, Johannesburg–O. R. Tambo

== Traffic statistics ==
Annual passenger and aircraft statistics
Fiscal year (Apr–Mar)	Aircraft movements	Passenger traffic
2006–07	no data	129,037(▲31.5%)
2007–08	no data	147,275(▲14.1%)
2008–09	no data	155,615(▲5.7%)
2009–10	11,973	130,506(▼16.1%)
2010–11	12,511(▲4.5%)	132,756(▲1.7%)
2011–12	12,347(▼1.3%)	135,939(▲2.4%)
2012–13	11,556(▼6.3%)	151,405(▲11.4%)
2013–14	10,597(▼8.3%)	157,225(▲3.8%)
2014–15	11,819(▲11.5%)	160,442(▲2.0%)
2015–16	10,095(▼14.6%)	166,960(▲4.1%)
2016–17	9,798(▼2.9%)	177,260(▲6.2%)
2017–18	8,888(▼9.3%)	171,933(▼3.0%)
2018–19	9,991(▲12.4%)	161,168(▼6.3%)
2019–20	8,950(▼10.4%)	153,913(▼4.5%)
2020–21	4,950(▼44.7%)	35,813(▼76.7%)
2021–22	8,420(▲70.1%)	93,626(▲161.4%)
2022–23	8,692(▲3.2%)	137,875(▲47.3%)
2023–24	7,595(▼12.6%)	155,292(▲12.6%)
2024–25	8,167(▲7.5%)	162,776(▲4.8%)
2025–26	7,419(▼9.2%)	170,738(▲4.9%)
Source: ACSA

== See also ==
- List of airports in South Africa
- List of South African airports by passenger movements
