= Bram Fischer International Airport =

Bram Fischer International Airport Bram Fischer Internasionale Lughawe (Afrikaans)
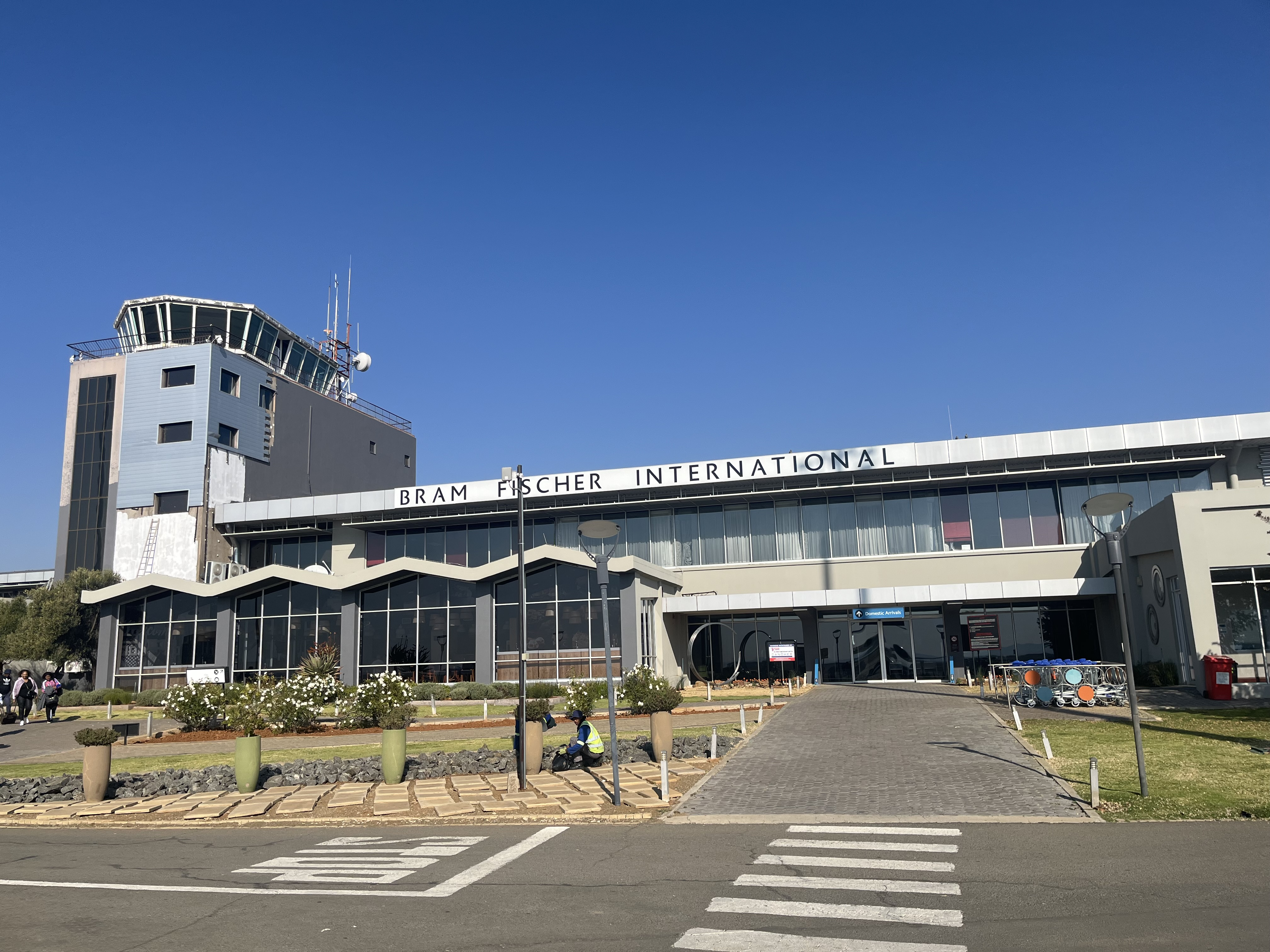
- IATA: BFN; ICAO: FABL

Summary
- Airport type: Public / Military
- Operator: ACSA; South African Air Force
- Location: Bloemfontein, Free State, South Africa
- Focus city for: CemAir
- Elevation AMSL: 4,457 ft / 1,358 m
- Coordinates: 29°05′38″S 26°18′14″E
- Website: sa-airports.co.za/bram-fischer-airport

Maps
- Interactive Map
- Location in the Free State BFN (South Africa) BFN (Africa)

Runways
Direction	Length		Surface
Direction	m	ft	Surface
02/20	2,563	8,409	Asphalt
12/30	2,194	7,198	Asphalt

Statistics (FY 2025–26)
- Passenger traffic: 431,359
- Aircraft movements: 11,623
- Sources:DAFIF

Bram Fischer International Airport (IATA: BFN, ICAO: FABL) (Afrikaans: Bram Fischer Internasionale Lughawe) is an airport serving Bloemfontein, the capital city of the Free State province of South Africa. The runways are shared with AFB Bloemspruit.

== History ==
The airport was opened in November 1961 and the runways were completed before the terminal buildings so that the South African Airforce could make use of them.

Bloemfontein Airport, like many others in South Africa, underwent R46 million's worth of construction and upgrading of the whole airport in preparation for the 2010 FIFA World Cup.

In November 2012, the South African government announced that the airport's name was to be changed to Bram Fischer International Airport; the official renaming was performed by Pres. Jacob Zuma on Thursday, 13 December 2012.

== Facilities ==
The main terminal building is used for both international and domestic flights.

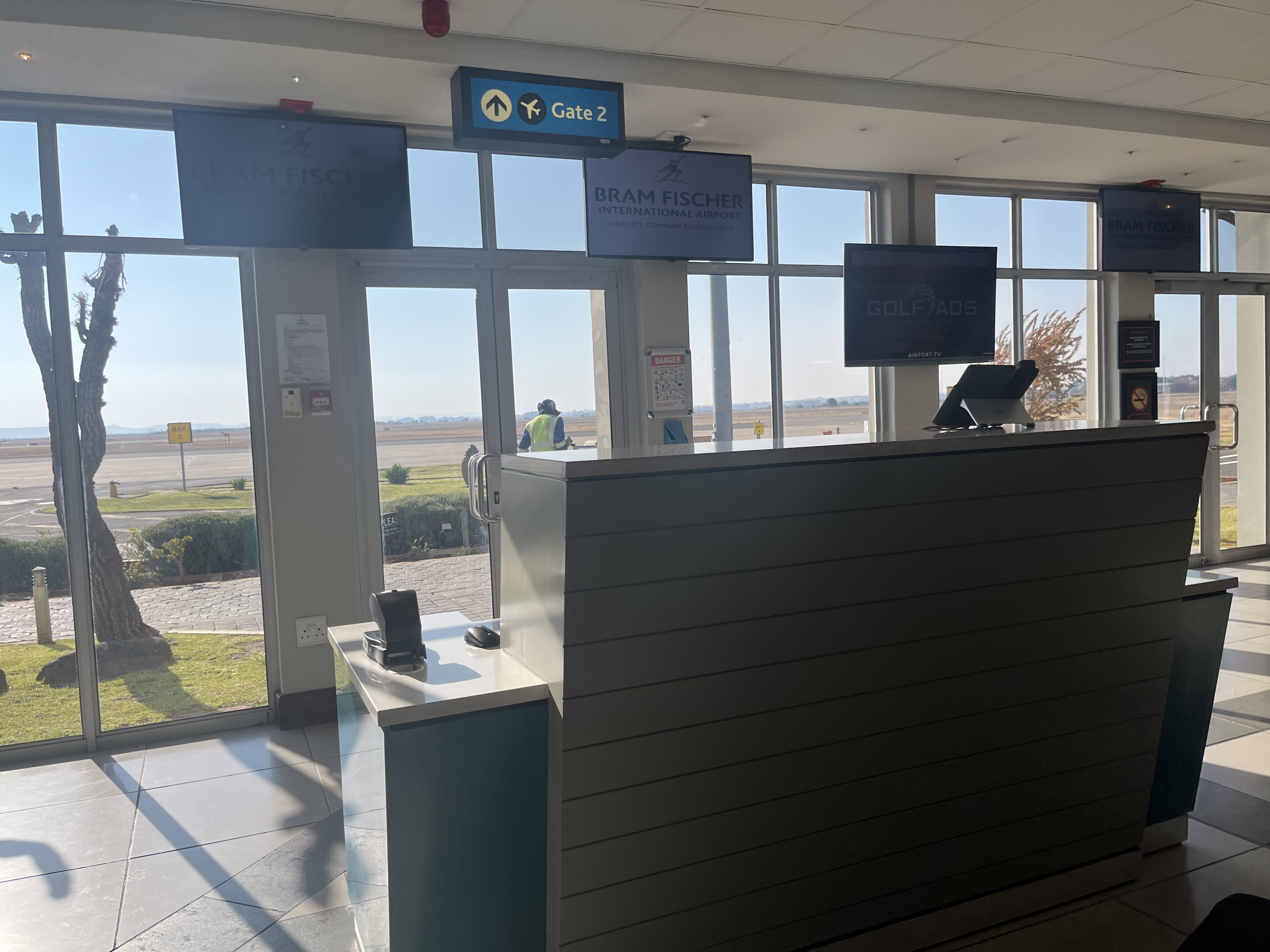
Bram Fischer International Airport Gate 2

== Airlines and destinations ==
Airlines	Destinations
Airlink	Cape Town, Durban, Johannesburg–O. R. Tambo
CemAir	Durban, George, Johannesburg–O. R. Tambo
FlySafair	Cape Town, Johannesburg–O. R. Tambo

Destinations Map

== Statistics ==
Annual passenger and aircraft statistics
Fiscal year (Apr–Mar)	Aircraft movements	Passenger traffic
2006–07	no data	305,701(▲23.8%)
2007–08	no data	424,924(▲39.0%)
2008–09	no data	411,683(▼3.1%)
2009–10	22,390	399,666(▼2.9%)
2010–11	18,821(▼15.9%)	403,766(▲1.0%)
2011–12	20,088(▲6.7%)	437,996(▲8.5%)
2012–13	17,515(▼12.8%)	411,655(▼6.0%)
2013–14	14,066(▼19.7%)	382,155(▼7.2%)
2014–15	16,702(▲18.7%)	363,895(▼4.8%)
2015–16	17,359(▲3.9%)	393,471(▲8.1%)
2016–17	17,945(▲3.4%)	395,452(▲0.5%)
2017–18	19,665(▲9.6%)	396,725(▲0.3%)
2018–19	18,618(▼5.3%)	355,052(▼10.5%)
2019–20	17,421(▼6.4%)	357,391(▲0.7%)
2020–21	10,554(▼39.4%)	73,071(▼79.6%)
2021–22	12,420(▲17.7%)	204,692(▲180.1%)
2022–23	13,725(▲10.5%)	318,135(▲55.4%)
2023–24	12,478(▼9.1%)	346,373(▲8.9%)
2024–25	12,192(▼2.3%)	387,009(▲11.7%)
2025–26	11,623(▼4.7%)	431,359(▲11.5%)
Source: ACSA

== See also ==
- List of airports in South Africa
- List of South African airports by passenger movements
