= Comair (South Africa) =

Airline of South Africa, 1943–2022

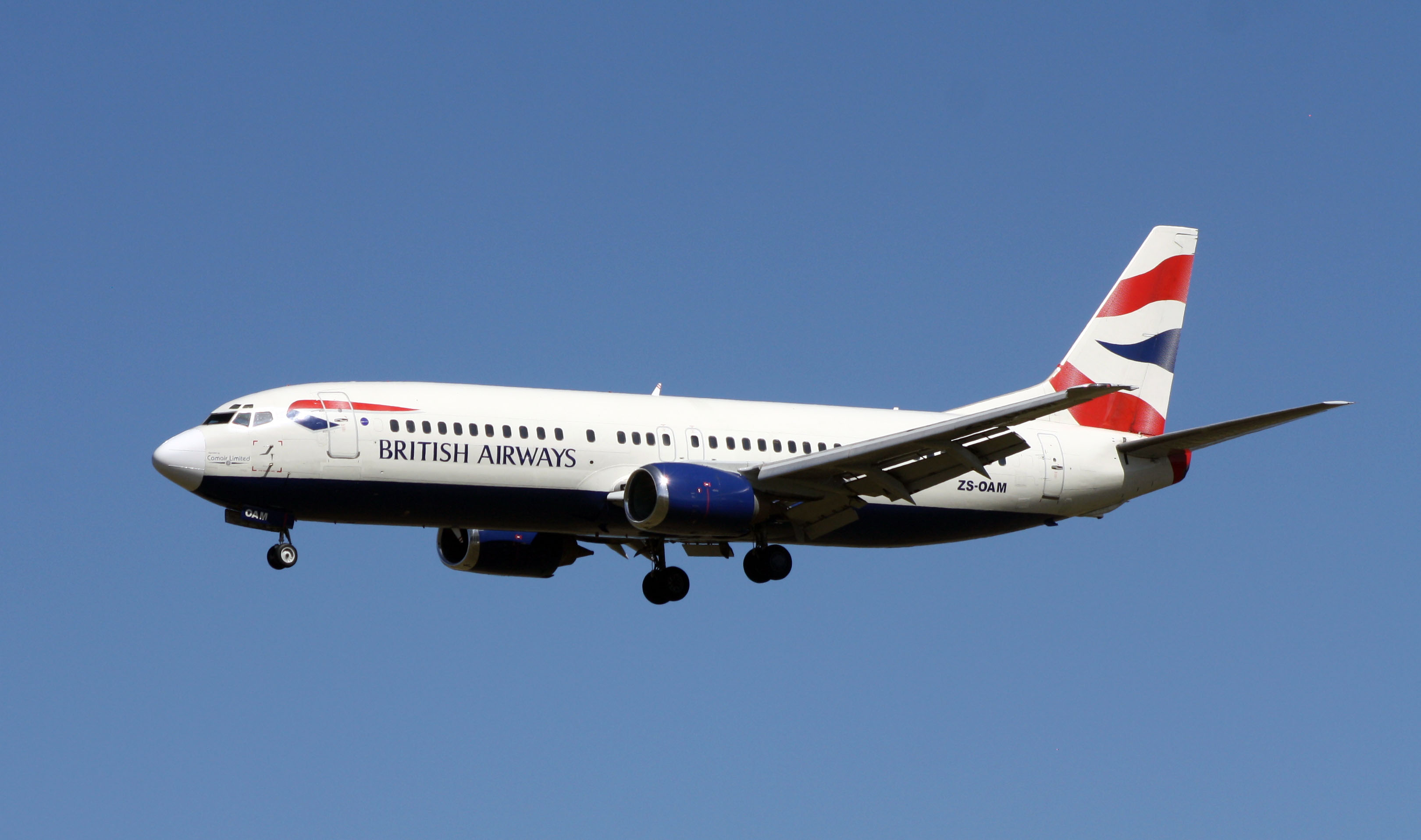
- Comair Boeing 737-400 in British Airways livery
IATA	ICAO	Call sign
MN	CAW	COMAIR
- Founded: 1943 (as Commercial Air Services)
- Ceased operations: 9 June 2022
- Hubs: Johannesburg–Palmietfontein (before 1952); Johannesburg–O. R. Tambo
- Focus cities: Cape Town–Wingfield (before 1954); Cape Town–Matroosfontein; Durban–Louis Botha (before 2010); Durban–King Shaka
- Frequent-flyer program: Executive Club/Avios
- Alliance: Oneworld (affiliate; 1999–2022)
- Subsidiaries: kulula.com
- Parent company: British Airways
- Headquarters: Kempton Park, Ekurhuleni, Gauteng, South Africa
- Key people: Glenn Orsmond (CEO); Kirsten King (CFO)
- Revenue: ▼ZAR 5.45 billion (2020)
- Profit: ▼ZAR −2.09 billion (2020)
- Website: www.comair.co.za

Comair Limited was an airline based in South Africa that operated scheduled services on domestic routes as a British Airways franchisee (and an affiliate member of the Oneworld airline alliance). It also operated as a low-cost carrier under its own kulula.com brand. Its main base was O. R. Tambo International Airport in Johannesburg, while focus cities were Cape Town International Airport in Cape Town, and King Shaka International Airport in Durban. Its headquarters were near OR Tambo in the Bonaero Park area of Kempton Park, Ekurhuleni, Gauteng.

== History ==
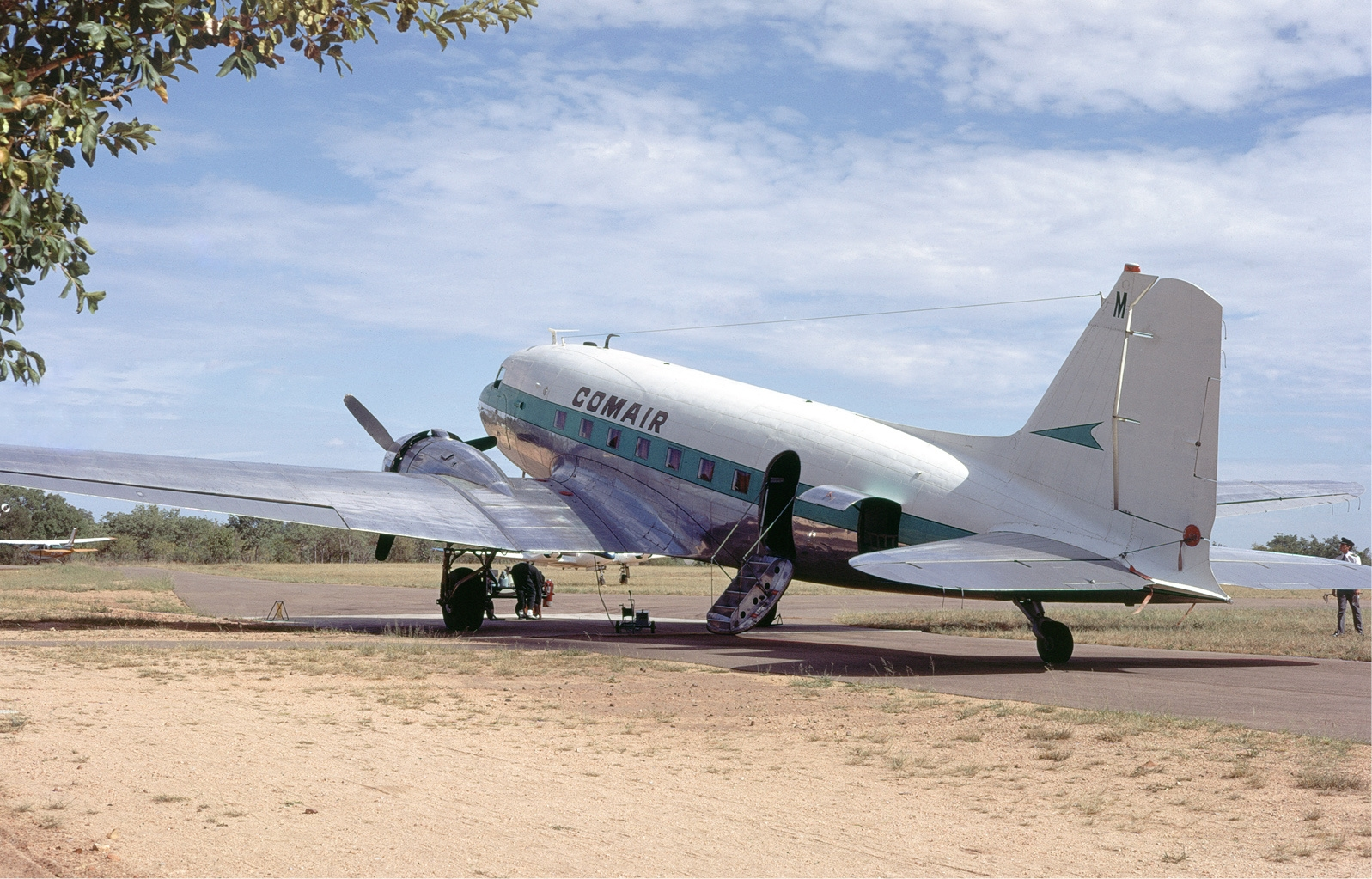
Comair Douglas DC-3 in 1973

The idea for the airline came out of discussion of two second world war pilots based in Egypt, J.M.S. Martin and A.L. Zoubert, they gained another partner Leon Zimmerman and Commercial Air Services was formed in 1943 on their return to South Africa. The company began charter operations on 15 June 1946 using Fairchild F-24 Argus and Douglas DC-3 aircraft. Scheduled services between Rand Airport, Johannesburg and Durban began on 1 July 1948, using a Cessna 195.

In 1978, Donald (Dave) Novick negotiated a management buyout of Comair's aviation assets. A lengthy legal battle ensued between Novick and the Pickard Group. On 5 June 1978, Justice George Colman rendered a 291-page document in favour of Novick. In doing so, Colman established 12 precedents in South African corporate law; the litigation is now considered to be a landmark case.

When Novick joined Comair in 1961, the company had some 50 employees and operated two Douglas DC-3 aircraft. Under his direction, the company expanded its fleet into jet aircraft after the de-regulation of South African airline routes in 1991.

Novick pioneered a strong relationship with British Airways and a partnership through a franchise arrangement. In January 2000, British Airways purchased an 18% shareholding in Comair.

In 2001 kulula.com was established, by co-founders Gidon Novick and Erik Venter, as the first low-cost airline in South Africa. The airline maintained its lead in this segment of the market, serving leisure business customers. As part of a R3.5 billion investment in fleet upgrade, Comair ordered eight Boeing 737-800s to update its fleet in 2013.

In March 2014, Comair announced a R9 billion order for eight Boeing 737 MAX. The aircraft were due to be delivered from 2019 to 2022.

The government of the British Overseas Territories Saint Helena and the United Kingdom's Department for International Development (DFID) announced in March 2015 that it had reached agreement with Comair for the provision of weekly air services from Johannesburg, to commence in 2016, when the Atlantic island's airport was due to open for revenue service. Comair withdrew from the agreement before the introduction of scheduled flights, due to severe wind shear on the initial test flights. A scheduled service provided by Airlink started in 2017.

In August 2016, Imperial Air Cargo, a cargo airline in which Comair owned a 30 percent stake, started operations.

The company entered into voluntary business rescue proceedings on 5 May 2020, due to the impact of the COVID-19 pandemic. Operations were suspended on 31 May 2022. Comair filed for Chapter 15 bankruptcy on 16 February 2021. On 9 June 2022 the business rescue practitioners announced that there was no reasonable prospect of rescue and that the company be placed into liquidation.

== Corporate affairs ==
=== Ownership and structure ===
Comair Limited was a public company listed on the Johannesburg Stock Exchange (JSE: COM), but after going into business rescue on 5 May 2020, the company was delisted from the Johannesburg Stock Exchange on 7 April 2021; this gave it access to ZAR100 million rand (USD6.8 million) under the COVID-19 Loan Guarantee Scheme put in place between the South African Reserve Bank and large commercial banks.

The group had a number of subsidiary activities, including Comair Catering Proprietary Limited, trading under the Food Directions brand, that provided on-board catering and retail services to the group’s flights, and health and other food products to South African retailers, and also had a 56% shareholding in The Highly Nutritious Food Company Proprietary Limited, trading as Eatrite, that distributes its products to retailers in South Africa.

=== Business trends ===
The published key trends for the Comair group (which includes activities under the British Airways and kulula.com brands) are shown below, as at years ending 30 June.

Comair entered into voluntary business rescue proceedings on 5 May 2020, due to the impact of the coronavirus pandemic, and no annual accounts for the fiscal year ending 30 June 2020 have therefore been published. The figures for 2020 shown below are from the Management Accounts set out in the Business Rescue Plan:

	2009	2010	2011	2012	2013	2014	2015	2016	2017	2018	2019	2020
Turnover (R m)	3,049	3,010	3,588	4,163	5,387	5,903	5,891	5,960	6,064	6,537	7,126	5,448
Profit before tax (EBT) (R m)	114	124	106	11	331	374	301	295	435	471	1,103	−2,091
Profit after tax (R m)							219	193	297	326	897	−1,647
Number of employees	1,782	1,941	1,953	1,853	1,912	2,026	2,088	2,100	2,121	2,206	2,193	
Number of passengers (m)						5.2	5.1	5.4	5.5	5.8	6.0	
Passenger load factor (%)									76	76	79	
Number of aircraft (at year end)	23	25	24	24	27	26	25	25	26	26	25	
Notes/sources												

=== Headquarters ===
The Group’s headquarters were based at 1 Marignane Drive, Bonaero Park, Kempton Park.

== Destinations ==
=== British Airways franchisee ===
Logo used operated by Comair under the franchise agreement with British Airways

Comair offered flights to and from the following destinations, operating under the British Airways brand:

Mauritius

- Port Louis – Sir Seewoosagur Ramgoolam International Airport

Namibia

- Windhoek – Hosea Kutako International Airport

South Africa

- Cape Town – Cape Town International Airport (focus city)
- Durban – King Shaka International Airport (focus city)
- Gqeberha – Chief Dawid Stuurman International Airport
- East London - King Phalo Airport
- Johannesburg – O. R. Tambo International Airport (hub)

Zambia

- Livingstone – Livingstone Airport

Zimbabwe

- Harare – Harare International Airport
- Victoria Falls – Victoria Falls Airport

=== kulula.com ===
Comair offered flights to and from the following destinations, operating under the kulula.com brand:

South Africa

- Cape Town – Cape Town International Airport (focus city)
- Durban – King Shaka International Airport (focus city)
- George – George Airport
- Johannesburg
  - Lanseria International Airport
  - O. R. Tambo International Airport (hub)

== Codeshares ==
Comair codeshared with the following airlines:

- Air France
- Cathay Pacific
- Etihad Airways
- Kenya Airways
- KLM
- Qatar Airways

== Fleet ==
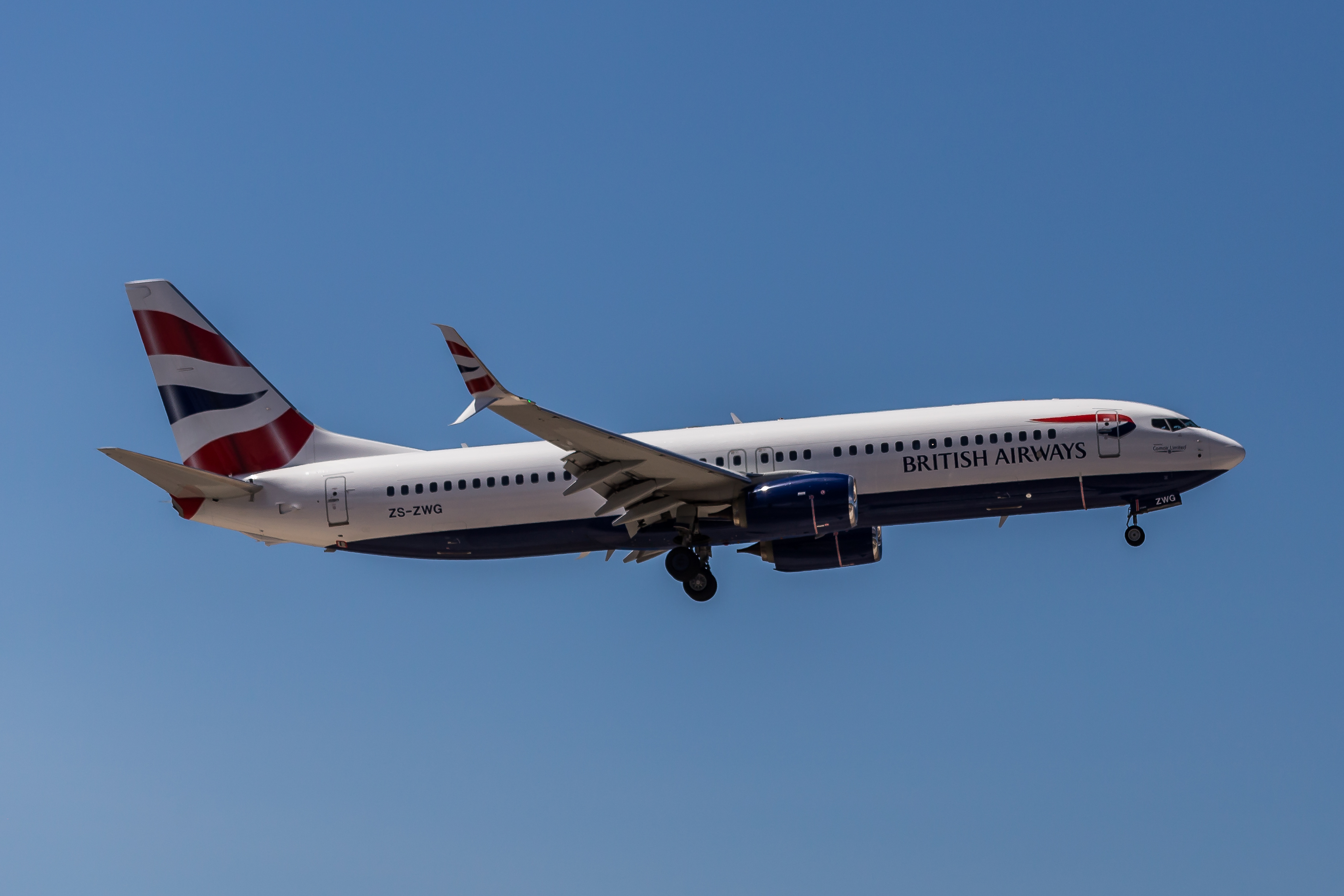
Comair Boeing 737-800 in British Airways livery

As of December 2021, Comair fleet included the following aircraft operated as British Airways franchise:

Comair fleet
Aircraft	Total	Orders	Passengers			Notes
Aircraft	Total	Orders	C	Y	Total	Notes
Boeing 737-400	2	—	18	126	144	
Boeing 737-800	10	—	24	138	162	
Boeing 737 MAX 8	1	—				
Total	12	—				

== Incidents and accidents ==
- On 12 October 1982, Douglas C-47A ZS-EJK was written off when it crashed into a mountain near Graskop in the Eastern Transvaal, 36 nautical miles (67 km) from Hoedspruit when attempting to divert to that airport. The weather was instrument meteorological conditions. All 30 people on board survived.
- On 1 March 1988, Comair Flight 206, an Embraer 110 Bandeirante, crashed in Johannesburg, killing all 17 occupants. One source suggests that this incident was caused by an explosive device, carried by a passenger employed as a mineworker who had recently taken out a substantial insurance policy.
- On 26 October 2015, Comair Flight BA6234 (ZS-OAA), a Boeing 737-400 operated by Comair on behalf of British Airways, crashed and was damaged beyond repair at OR Tambo International Airport. The crash was suspected to be caused by an early flare and fast touch down causing the left landing gear to collapse. No-one was killed or injured.

== See also ==
- Airlines of Africa
