= Mutungi =

Mutungi is an African surname. Notable people with the surname include:

- Irene Koki Mutungi (born 1976), Kenyan pilot
- Joseph Mutungi, Kenyan Anglican bishop
- Onesmus Kimweli Mutungi (1940–2016), Kenyan judge and law professor
