= Kulula.com =

Low-cost airline of South Africa (2001–2022)

IATA	ICAO	Call sign
MN	CAW	COMAIR
- Founded: 6 July 2001
- Ceased operations: 9 June 2022
- Operating bases: O. R. Tambo International Airport
- Fleet size: 10
- Destinations: 6
- Parent company: Comair
- Headquarters: Bonaero Park, Kempton Park, Ekurhuleni, Gauteng, South Africa
- Key people: Wrenelle Stander
- Website: www.kulula.com

Kulula.com (stylized as kulula.com) and commonly referred to as Kulula was a South African low-cost airline, operating on major domestic routes from O. R. Tambo International Airport and Lanseria International Airport, both serving the city of Johannesburg. The airline's headquarters were located at Bonaero Park, Kempton Park, Ekurhuleni, Gauteng. The name 'Kulula' comes from the Nguni languages of Zulu and Xhosa, meaning It's easy. (Note: This "word" is made of the general verbal present particle ku- and the root lula: easy or light (both easy and not heavy).) Kulula suspended operations on 1 June 2022 pending securing of additional funding. The company was placed into liquidation on 9 June 2022.

== History ==
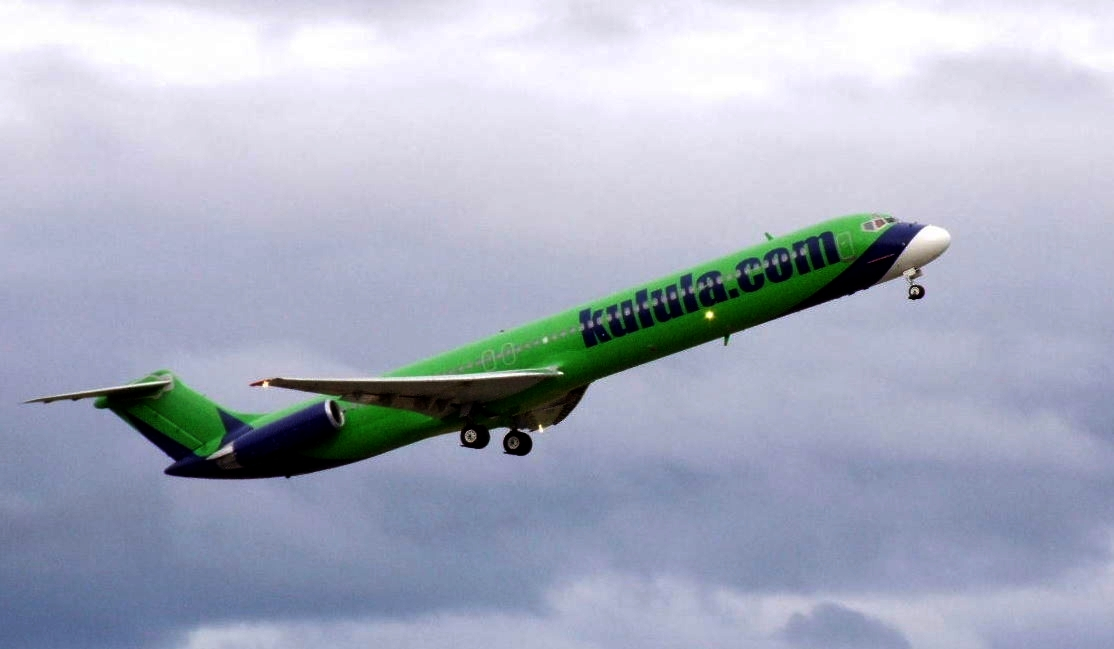
A former kulula.com McDonnell Douglas MD-82, acquired in 2004.

Kulula.com was established in July 2001 and commenced operations as South Africa's first 'no-frills' carrier in August of that year. The stated aim was to position kulula.com as more than just an airline brand, but to include booking, paying and making 'the complete travel experience' affordable.

In 2010, Kulula.com was forced by FIFA to stop a campaign describing itself as the "Unofficial National Carrier of the You-Know-What", which took place "Not next year, not last year, but somewhere in between", obviously referring to the 2010 FIFA World Cup which took place in South Africa at that time. Another advert announced "affordable flights [to] everybody except Sepp Blatter" (the FIFA president), who was offered a free seat "for the duration of that thing that is happening right now".

In July 2012 Kulula.com announced that it was operating the first of seven brand new Boeing 737-800s, with three to be in operation before the end of that year, and the remaining four to be delivered in 2015 and 2016.

Kulula.com and parent company Comair suspended operations towards the end of March 2020 due to financial constraints caused by the COVID-19 pandemic. The airline resumed operations in September 2021. On 1 June 2022, Kulula.com suspended all flights and entered business rescue Kulula.com was accused of using a sale a day before to raise cash before stopping flights. Since suspension, only people who booked through Discovery Vitality were given the opportunity to obtain a refund. On 9 June 2022 the business rescue practitioners announced that there was no reasonable prospect of rescue of either Kulula or Comair and that the companies be placed into liquidation.

== Corporate affairs ==
=== Ownership ===
Kulula.com was a wholly owned subsidiary of Comair Ltd, which also operated flights as a franchisee of British Airways. Kulula.com, the British Airways franchise Southern Africa and Comair Ltd suspended operations in July 2020 due to financial issues caused by the COVID-19 pandemic.

=== Business trends ===
Financial and operational results for Kulula.com are not separately disclosed, but are fully incorporated within the annual results for Comair (for years ending 30 June).

== Destinations ==
As of March 2019, Kulula served the following destinations:

Province	City	Airport	Notes
Eastern Cape	East London	East London Airport	
Eastern Cape	Gqeberha	Port Elizabeth International Airport	
Gauteng	Johannesburg	O. R. Tambo International Airport	Hub
Gauteng	Johannesburg	Lanseria International Airport	Hub
KwaZulu-Natal	Durban	King Shaka International Airport	
Western Cape	Cape Town	Cape Town International Airport	
Western Cape	George	George Airport	

=== Codeshare agreements ===
Kulula held codeshare agreements with the following airlines:

- Comair
- Kenya Airways
- KLM

== Fleet ==
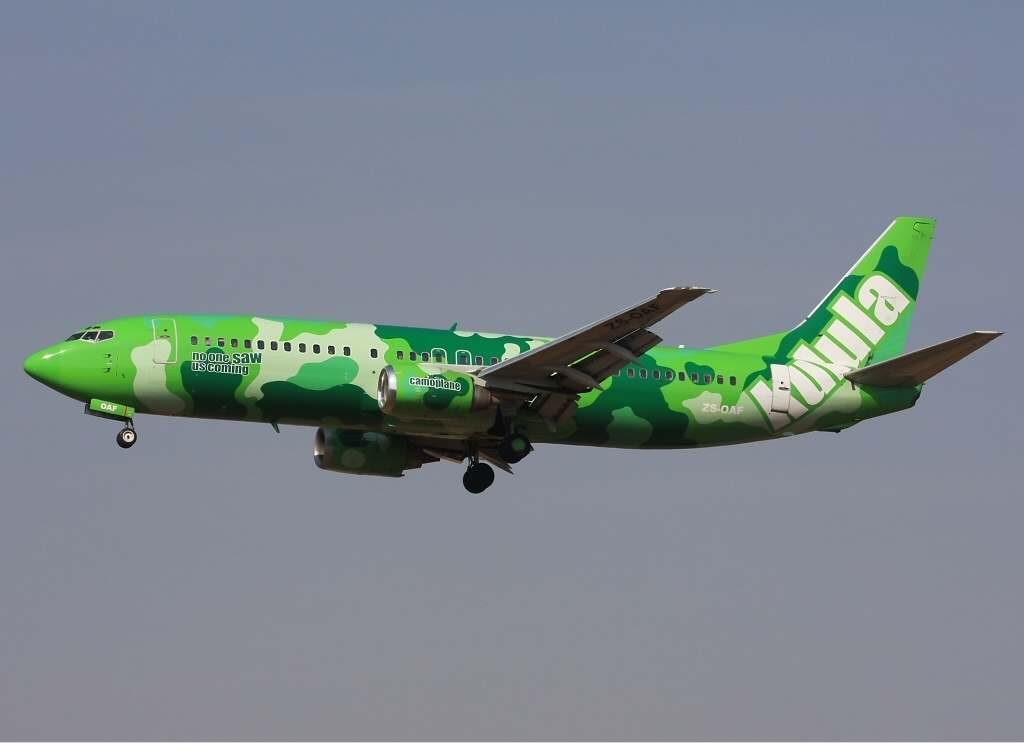
kulula.com Boeing 737-400 Wearing Camoplane livery

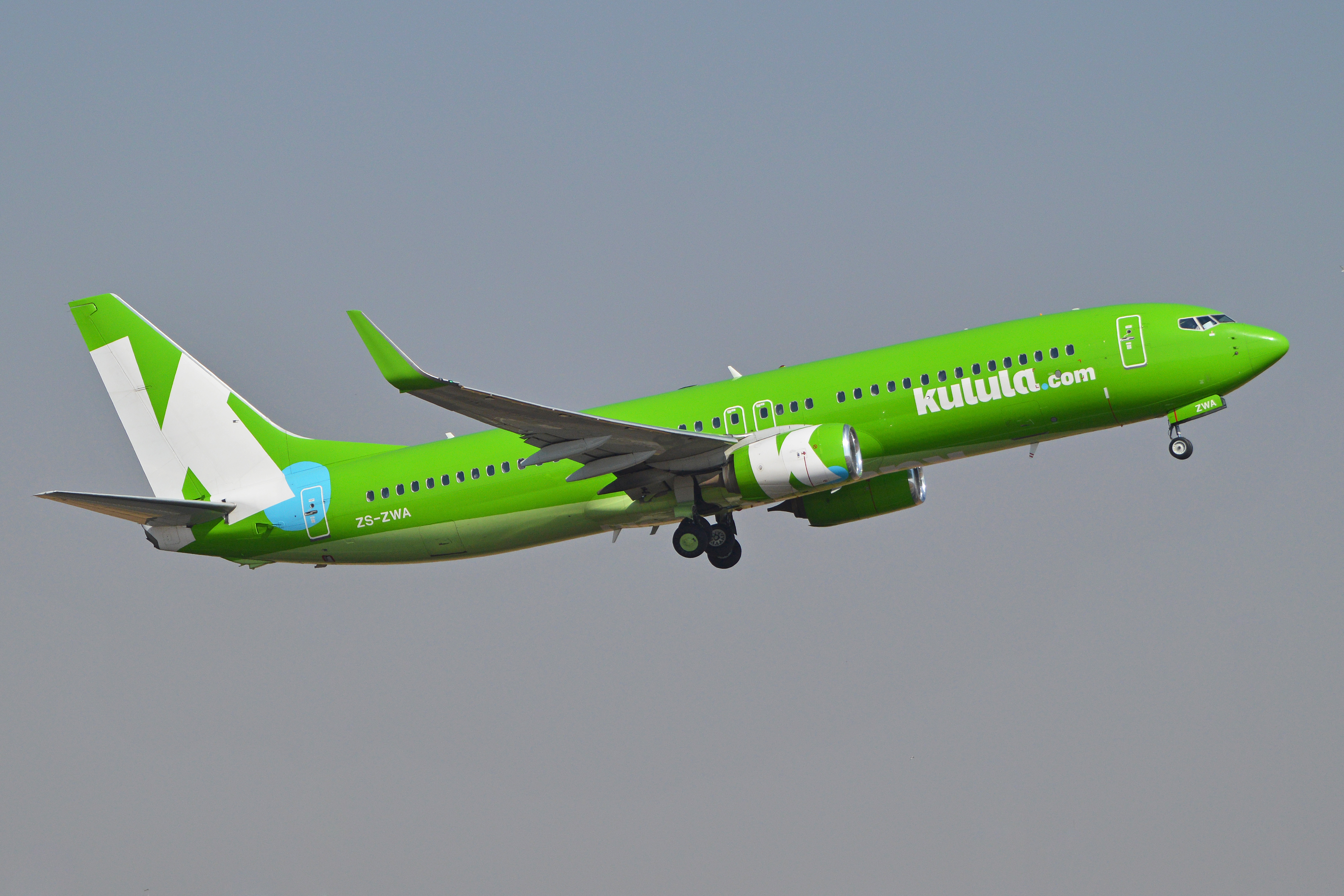
kulula.com Boeing 737-800

As of October 2018, the Kulula.com fleet consisted of the following aircraft:

Kulula.com fleet
Aircraft	In service	Orders	Passengers (Economy)	Notes
Boeing 737-400	0	—	162	
Boeing 737-800	0	—	186	
Boeing 737-800	0	—	189	
Total	0	—		

=== Historical fleet ===
Kulula previously operated the following aircraft:

- Boeing 727-200
- Boeing 737-200
- McDonnell Douglas MD-82

=== Liveries ===
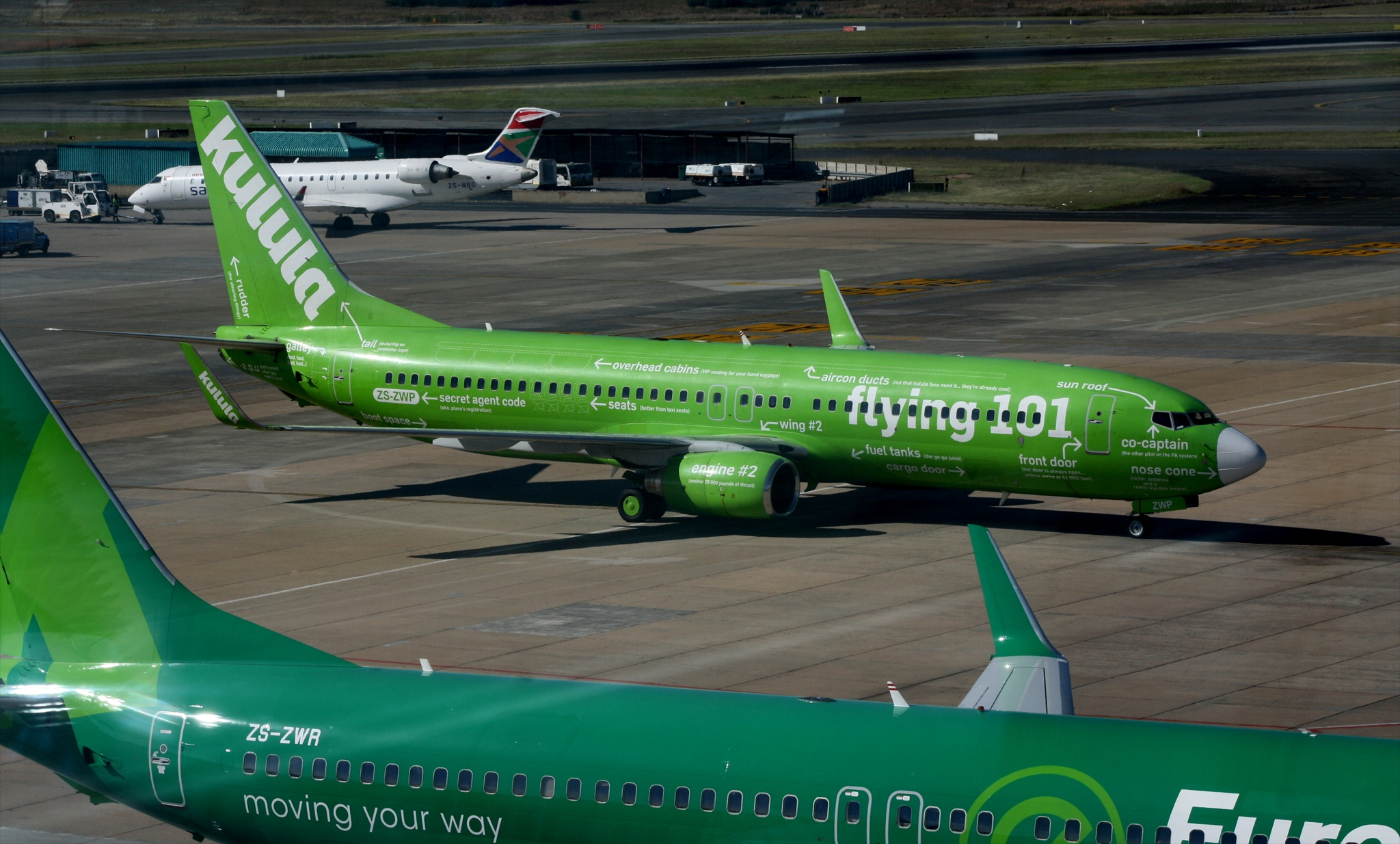
the aircraft wearing the livery "Flying 101"

Kulula.com became known for its distinctive, brightly coloured, and often comedic aircraft liveries. One of its former aircraft, known as Flying 101, was covered with a legend describing the different parts of the aircraft.

== Services ==
=== Loyalty programme ===
Kulula.com operated the Avios frequent-flyer programme, which was created from the merger of the Air Miles, BA Miles and Iberia Plus Points schemes on 16 November 2011. A restructure in 2015 meant that all of IAG's affiliated loyalty programmes which use Avios, including Avios Travel Reward Programme, Iberia Plus and British Airways Executive Club were transferred to Avios Group, an IAG subsidiary.

=== Inflight services ===
Kulula.com offered food and drinks as a buy-on-board programme. The airline's in-flight magazine, khuluma, had a readership base of 200,000 per month.

== See also ==
- Mango, another defunct South African low-cost airline.
