= Zandile Ndhlovu =

South African social activist and freediving instructor

- Born: August 25, 1988 (age 37); Soweto, South Africa
- Occupation: Ocean Conservationist & Storyteller
- Awards: 100 Women (BBC) (2023)

Zandile Ndhlovu is a South African ocean conservationist, social activist, and filmmaker who is the first black female freediving instructor from the country. She is the founder of The Black Mermaid Foundation. In November 2023, Ndhlovu was named to the BBC's 100 Women list.

== Biography ==
Ndhlovu was raised in the landlocked township of Soweto, which borders Johannesburg. She had never gone to a swimming pool or learned to swim as a young child until she was eleven years old and enrolled in a multiracial school. She was formerly a consultant with a focus on equality, diversity, and inclusion. Her love of the sea developed after she went to Bali, Indonesia and experienced snorkelling for the first time. While perusing Instagram, she came upon freediving and became certified as a scuba diving instructor. Ndlovu became the first black female diving instructor from South Africa and was affectionately called the Black Mermaid. In 2020 she founded the Black Mermaid Foundation. In the municipality of Langa, which is close to Cape Town, she began working with a community group. She taught them how to swim and snorkel while in the water, and also made them aware about the effects of plastic waste on wildlife.

== Recognition ==
- SA Book Awards 2024 - Children's Book Winner (Zandi's Song)
- Glamour Women of The Year Nominee 2024 - Next Gen Award
- EcoLogic Awards 2024 - EcoAngel Award Recipient
- SAIMI Imbokodo in Maritime Awards 2024 - Marine Sport & Recreation Award Recipient
- Lewis Pugh Foundation Environmental Sports Champions list 2024
- Boat International Ocean Awards 2023 - Public Awareness Award
- Condé Nast Traveler Women who Travel Power List 2023
- Travel & Leisure Global Vision Awards 2023
- SMag Women of the Year in Sport 2022
- Cape Union Mart Adventure Film Challenge Aspiring Film Maker Category Winner
- Torchbearer Award 2021 (PADI)
- Tedx Speaker
- Jackson Wild Film Making Fellow 2021
- Corona Brand Creator & Free Range Humans
- Featured on the cover of MSAFIRI – Kenya Airways Inflight Magazine (October 2023)
- BBC 100 Women, 2023
