= Allan Kilavuka =

Kenyan corporate executive

- Born: Kenya
- Education: University of Nairobi (Bachelor of Commerce); University of Liverpool (Certificate in Psychology)
- Occupation: Corporate executive
- Years active: 1999–present
- Title: Former chief executive officer, Kenya Airways

Allan Kilavuka is a Kenyan businessman and corporate executive, who was the chief executive officer of Kenya Airways, the national airline of Kenya, from 1 April 2020 until his resignation on 16 December 2025. He was the CEO of Jambojet, a low-cost carrier wholly owned by Kenya Airways, from January 2019 to March 2020.

== Background and education ==
Kilavuka was born in Kenya and attended local primary and secondary schools. He studied at the University of Nairobi, graduating with a Bachelor of Commerce. He then obtained a Certificate in Psychology from the University of Liverpool in the United Kingdom. He also attended courses in advanced management, executive leadership and financial management at Crotonville Leadership Institute, owned by General Electric, located in Westchester County, New York State, United States.

== Career ==
Before he took up his assignment with Jambojet, where his appointment was announced in November 2018, he was the head of General Electric (GE) in sub-Saharan Africa. Prior to that, he worked in various capacities at GE and at Deloitte, in their sub-Saharan African businesses.

At Kenya Airways, he replaced Sebastian Mickosz, the Polish former chief executive, who resigned for personal reasons, before the expiry of his three-year contract. Kilavuka now sits on all the boards of Kenya Airways subsidiary companies. He remained at the board of Jambojet, initially as the CEO and as a representative of Kenya Airways, starting on 1 April 2020.

One of his first initiatives at KQ was to order a 25 percent executive pay cut for all top managers at the airline, beginning on 1 April 2020. The measure was aimed at conserving cash at the limping airline during the COVID-19 pandemic. As part of the same exercise, the company's board of directors would forego their board allowances during the same period.

In 2023, the board of directors of KQ extended Kilavuka's CEO contract for another three years until April 2026. Under his stewardship, the airline trimmed its annual losses and was expected to make a profit in 2024.

On 16 December 2025, Kilavuka took his "terminal leave", which was to run until the end of his contract. He was succeeded as CEO in interim capacity by Captain George Kamal, the airline's chief operating officer (COO).
