= Airlines of Africa =

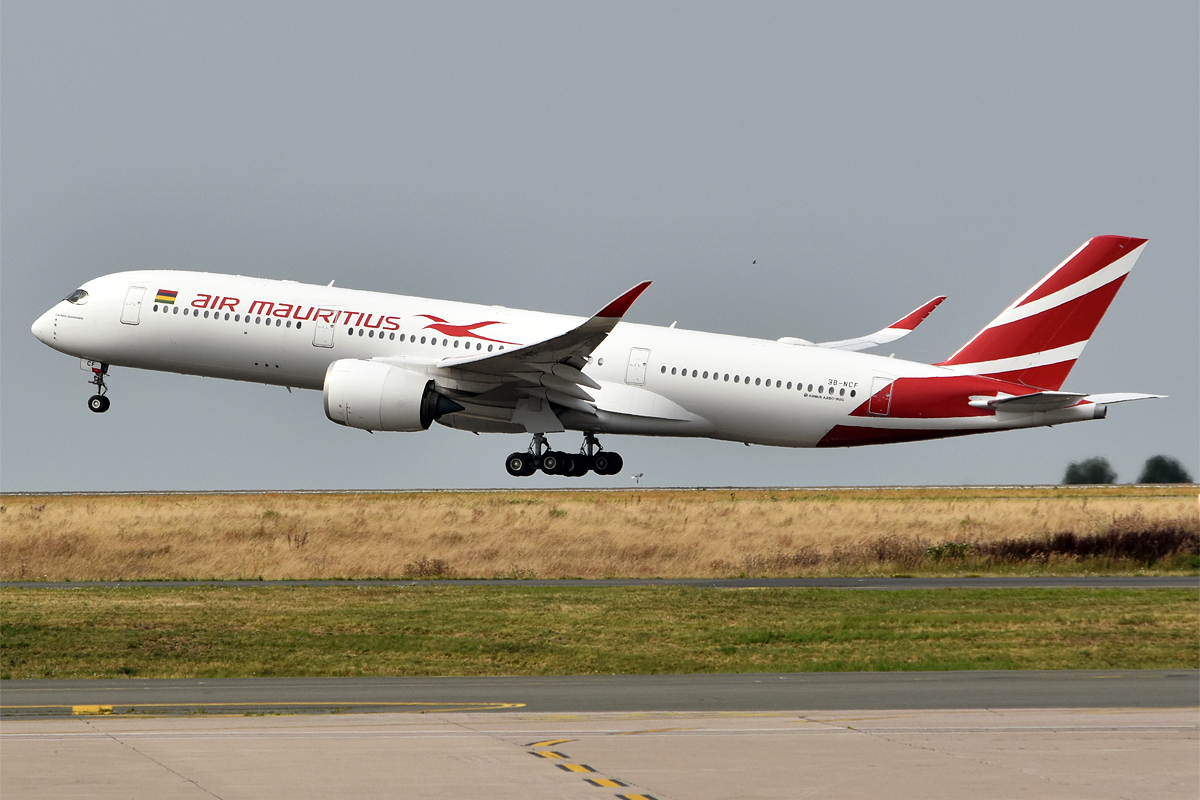
An Air Mauritius Airbus A350 at Charles de Gaulle Airport

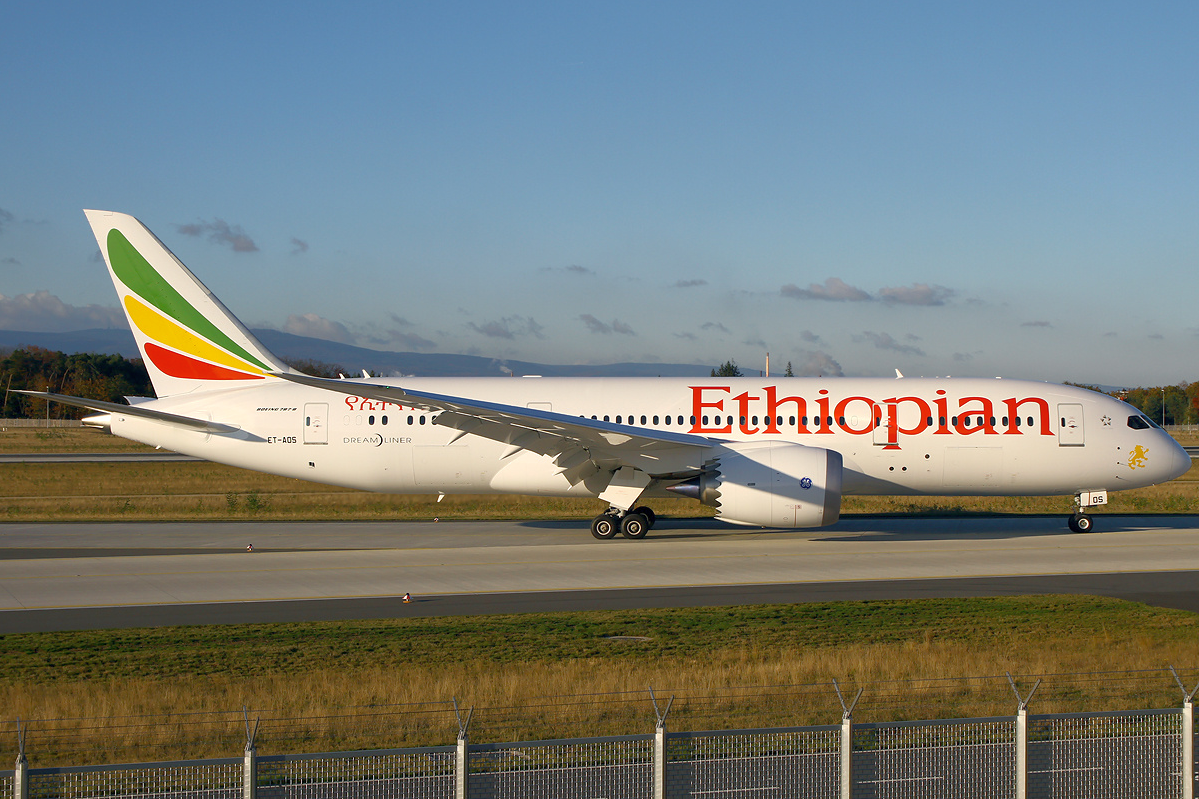
An Ethiopian Airlines Boeing 787-8

Airlines have proliferated in Africa because, in many countries, road and rail networks are not well developed due to financial issues, terrain, and rainy seasons. Ben R. Guttery, author of Encyclopedia of African Airlines, stated in 1998 that "Although most of the carriers have never been large by European or American standards, they have had tremendous impact on the economy and the people." Many larger African airlines are owned partially or completely by national governments. Some African airlines have or formerly had European airlines as major shareholders, such as KLM, which has a 7.8% stake in Kenya Airways and British Airways, which formerly had an 18% stake in Comair.

== History ==
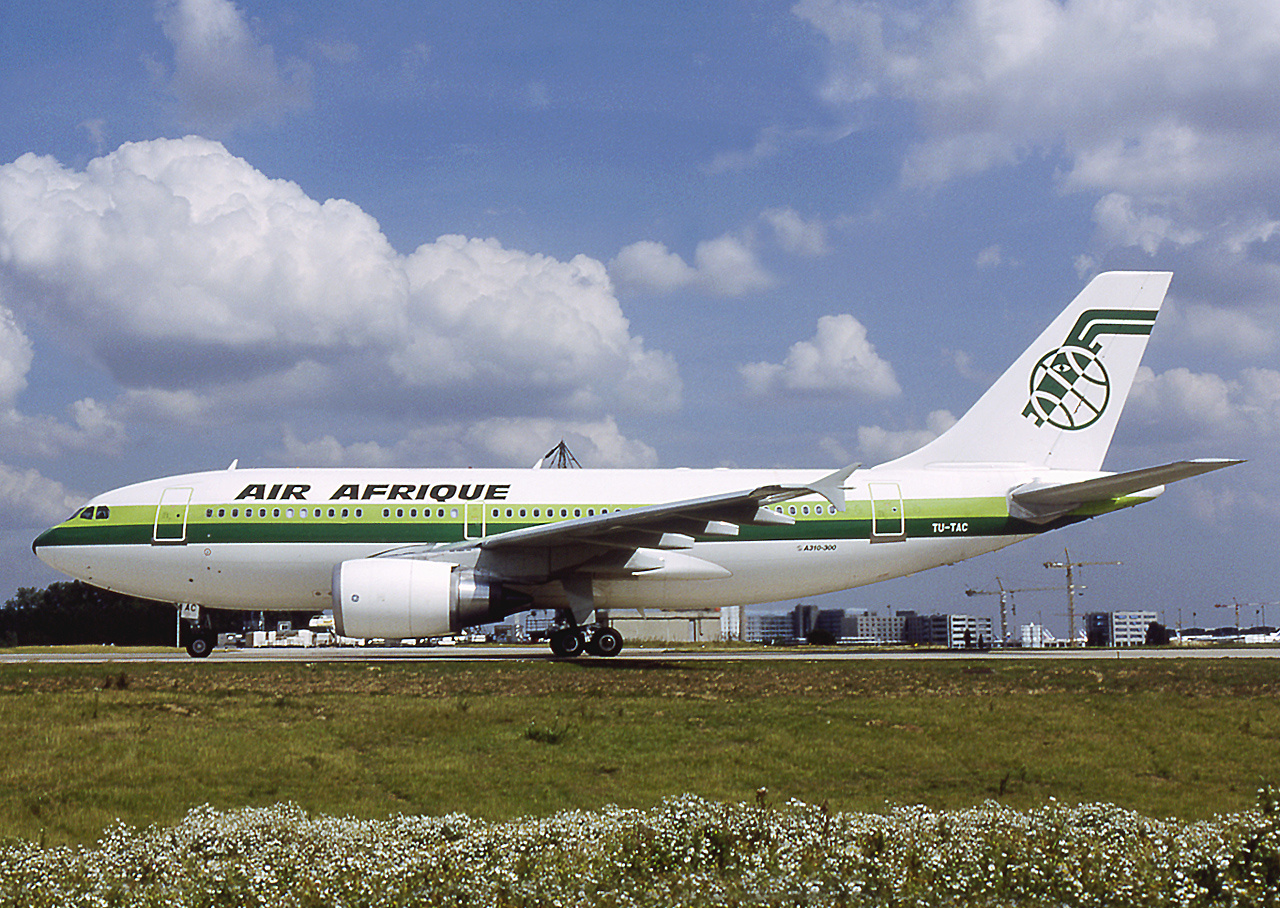
An Air Afrique Airbus A310-300

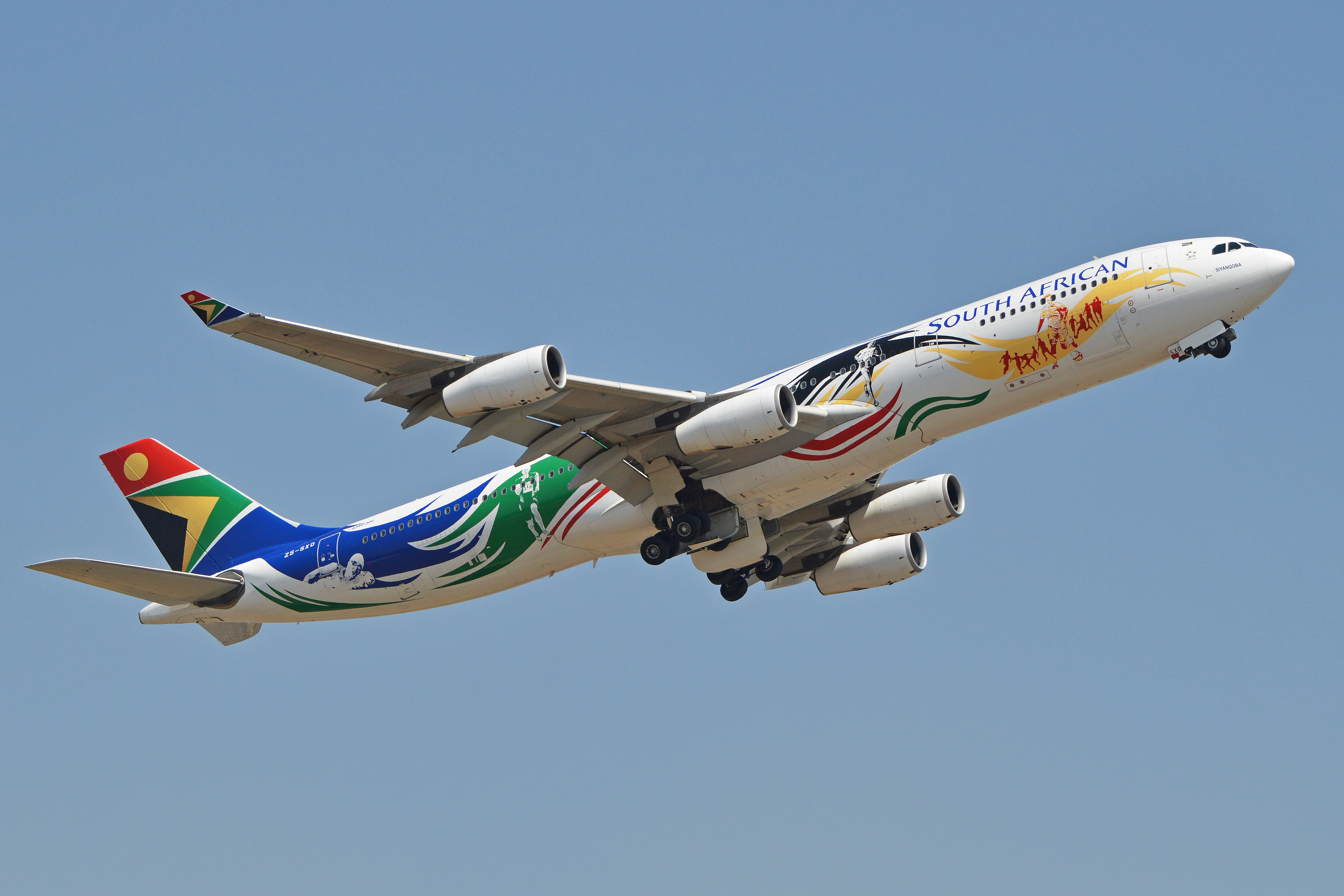
A South African Airways Airbus A340 in the 2012 Summer Olympics Livery

Historically, the British authorities established locally based airlines, while the national airlines of Belgium, France, Portugal, and Spain served their respective colonies. After African countries became independent, national governments established their own airlines. Many newly independent countries desired to have their own flag carriers to showcase their independence, and those countries wanted large jets like DC-10s and 747s even if the air demand did not warrant those jets. Some airlines, like Air Afrique, were jointly sponsored by multiple governments. Some joint carriers, such as Central African Airways, East African Airways, and West African Airways, were established while parts of Africa were colonies of the United Kingdom. The knowledge of aircraft, the airline industry, and financial capital, originating from the Europeans, was used to establish the new African carriers.

== Government ownership ==
In many cases European airlines have had colonial influences on African airlines, so issues arose after colonial administrators left Africa and Africans began operating the carriers. In 1998, many government airlines were crewed by governmental appointees as many airlines formed part of the structures of their respective national governments. According to Guttery, therefore, many African airlines were not well managed. This led to airlines being operated at severe losses and/or liquidating.

In addition, as of 1998, profits often went into the general operating funds of their respective countries, while many governments provide insufficient capital for their airlines. Also, as of 1998, many governments made airlines centres for employment and overstaffed their airlines, making them inefficient. Guttery said that even though the varieties of government management and ownership of African airlines "may be considered a hindrance in a world market driven by economics," due to the difficulties in raising financial capital and a lack of government infrastructure, government participation is crucial in the formation of airlines. As of 1998, African airlines relied on profitable international routes to subsidize less profitable domestic routes, many of which service very small communities.

Somaliland established Somaliland Airlines government funded airlines in 2024 With recognition bid, as its national carrier as an independent country.

== Fleet ==
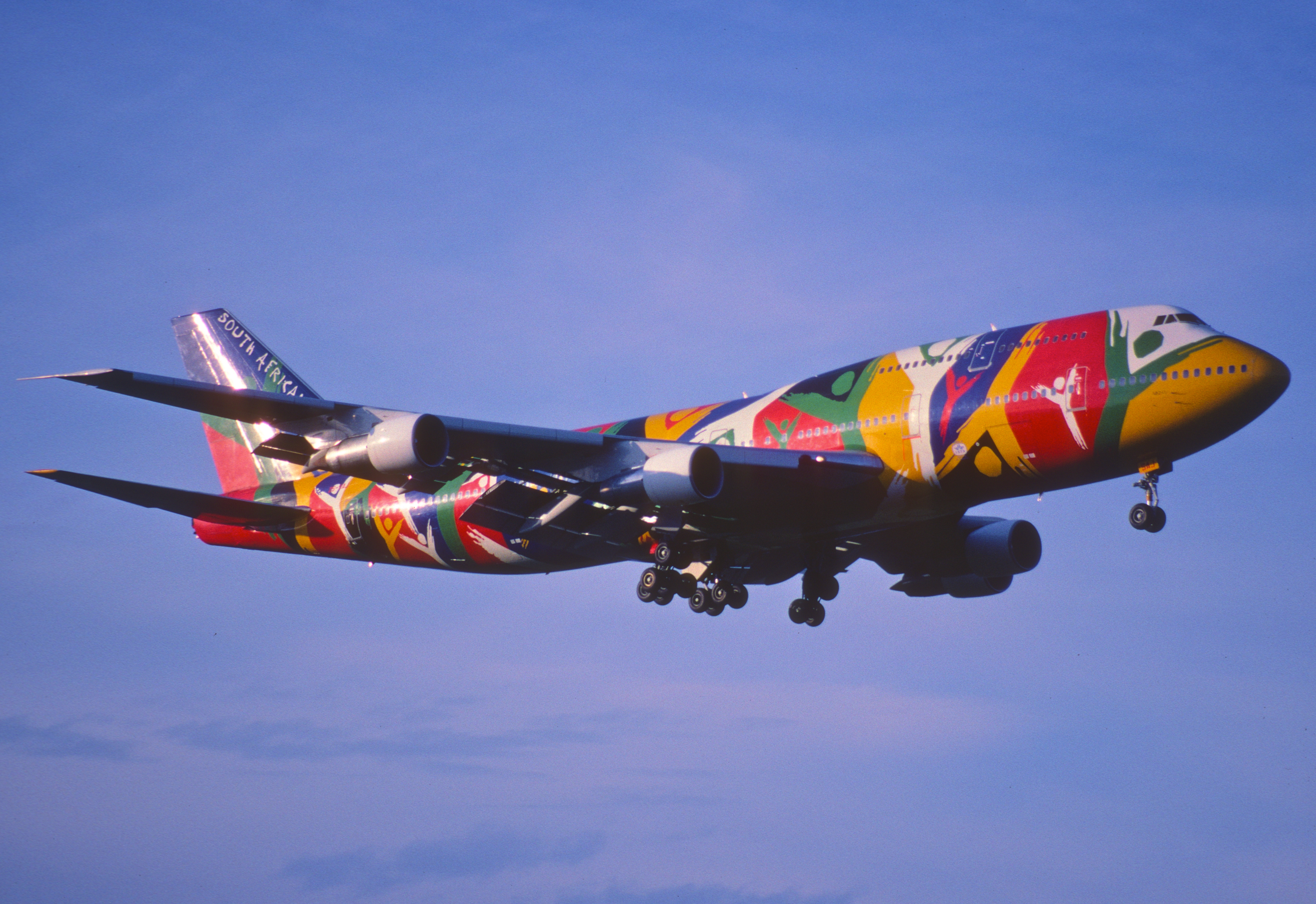
A South African Airways Boeing 747-300 with the Gold Medalist Livery (Ndizani) in Zurich, Switzerland

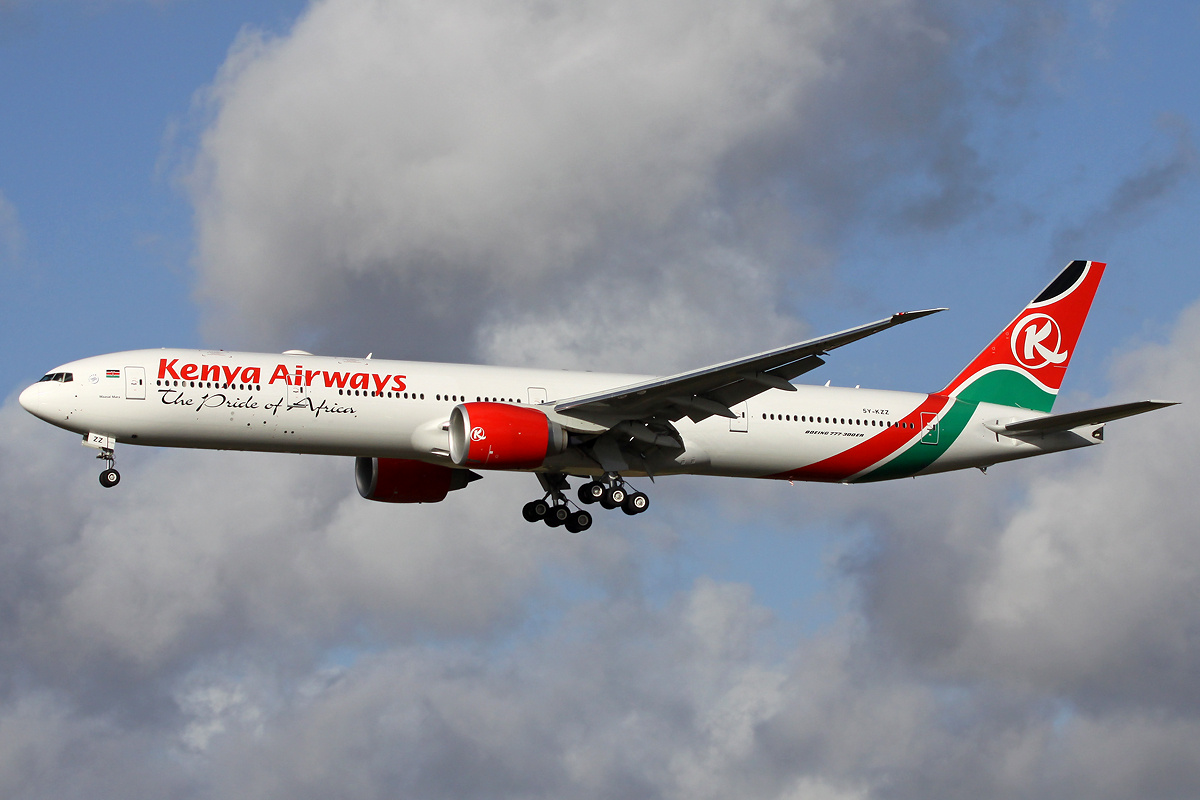
A Kenya Airways Boeing 777-300ER

Circa 2018, compared to aircraft in other world regions, aircraft in Africa tended to be older. As of 2010, 4.3% of all aircraft in the world flew within Africa. As of that year, of older aircraft, 12% flew within Africa. While older aircraft have low prices, they have higher fuel consumption rates and maintenance costs than newer aircraft. Because many African airlines had low credit ratings, in 2010 Africa had a low level of leasing contracts. As of that year, 5% of leased aircraft in the world flew in Africa.

== Alliance participation ==
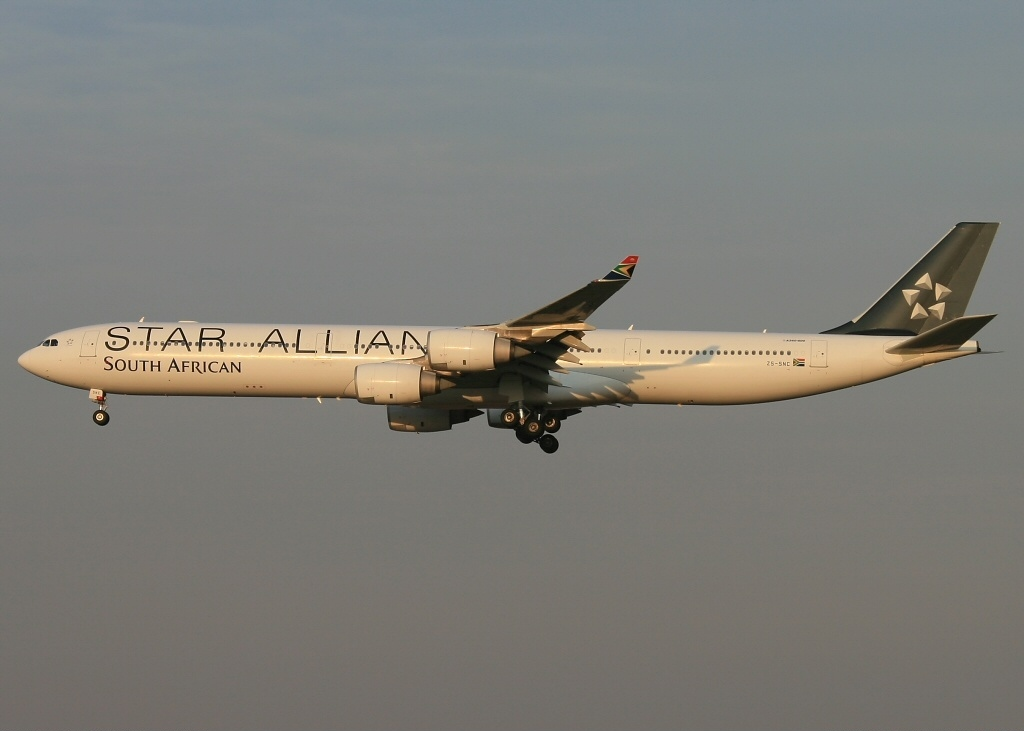
South African Airways Airbus A340-600 in a Star Alliance livery

As of 2010, the airline alliances within Africa tended to included codeshare agreements between multiple airlines in one consortium, and one African carrier owning equity in another African carrier. As of that year, relatively few African airlines participated in alliances with non-African carriers, because not enough of them are able to attract capital investment, and therefore were unable to develop networks attractive to airline alliances. However, a number of African flag carriers have been able to join global airline alliance networks: South African Airways became a member of Star Alliance on 10 April 2006. Kenya Airways became an associate member of SkyTeam on 4 September 2007, and it became a full SkyTeam member in 2010. Egyptair became a member of Star Alliance in July 2008, as did Ethiopian Airlines in December 2011. Royal Air Maroc joined Oneworld on 1 April 2020.

== Safety ==
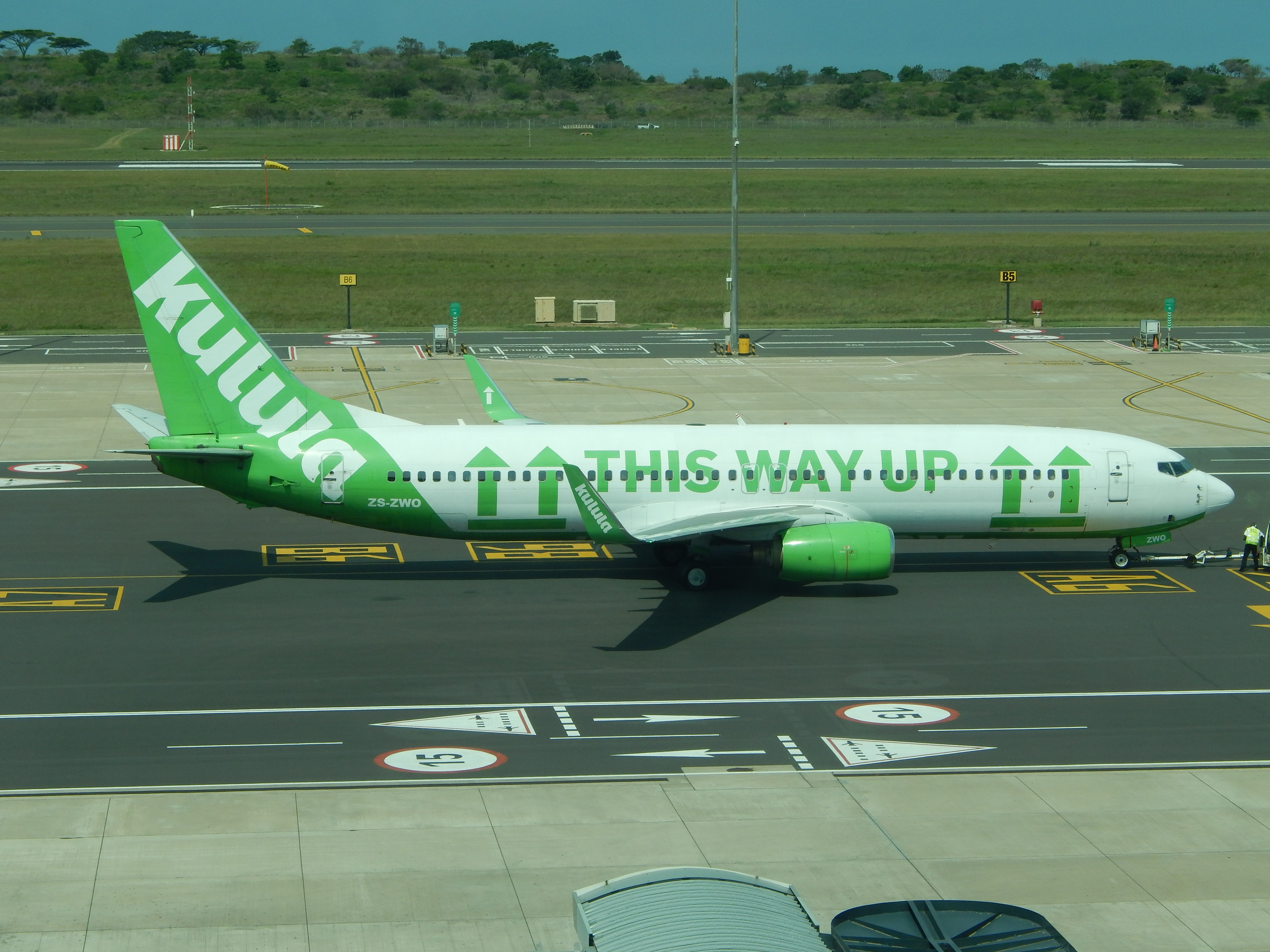
A Kulula.com Boeing 737

As of 1998, the International Civil Aviation Organization ranked Africa and Latin America as the world regions with the least safe air transportation networks. The African civil aviation network had undercapitalized infrastructure. As of 1998, Africa's air traffic control systems were not as developed as ATC systems in other parts of the world; Ben R. Guttery says that the lack of air traffic in Africa compensates for the underdeveloped ATC system. Also, compared to larger airfields, smaller airfields are less likely to have hard-surfaced runways. Guttery said in 1998 that major African airports "are virtually indistinguishable from those in developed countries." He also said in 1998 that "Airport security issues continue to be a problem, but they are being addressed."

By 2005, about 25% of aircraft crashes in the world occurred in Africa, while African flights were 5% of worldwide airline traffic. The Wall Street Journal stated that "For decades, African aviation has suffered from antiquated planes, crumbling airports, broken equipment and poorly trained pilots" and that Africa had a "widespread neglect that makes this continent's skies the most dangerous in the world." The WSJ stated that a lack of enforcement of minimal safety standards by governments due to a lack of power or dishonesty is "the broadest reason for the dismal safety record".

Aviation columnist Patrick Smith, in a 2013 book, stated that major air carriers in Africa had far safer operations than smaller carriers.

By 2020 however, African aviation had improved safety to the point that flying in Africa is safer than the global average with respect to accidents per million flights.

== See also ==
- List of airlines of Africa
  - List of largest airlines in Africa
- African Airlines Association
