= Geraldine Waruguru =

Kenyan businesswoman and airline pilot

- Born: 1984 (age 41–42); Mombasa, Kenya
- Citizenship: Kenyan
- Occupations: Businesswoman, airline pilot
- Years active: 2006–present
- Title: Founder, owner & CEO of Scents By Geraldine Limited; first officer at Kenya Airways

Geraldine Waruguru is a Kenyan businesswoman and airline pilot. She is the founder, co-owner and chief executive officer of Scents by Geraldine Limited, a perfume manufacturing business, based in Nairobi. She concurrently works as an airline transport pilot, and serves as a first officer at Kenya Airways, Kenya's national carrier airline, on the Boeing 737 aircraft.

== Background and education ==
Waruguru was born in Kenya circa 1984. She attended Kenyan schools for her elementary and secondary education. She then obtained a commercial pilot licence from the 43rd Air School, in Port Alfred, South Africa.

In 2016, she undertook a course in perfumery.

== Career ==
Waruguru began flying for Kenya Airways in 2006. After several years of research, she decided to start her own perfume line in 2016. After looking for a manufacturing partner in Germany, South Africa and the United Kingdom, she selected Scentury Company from Berlin.

Her first branded perfume came to market in 2017, after Waruguru spent €25,000 of her personal savings on developing the brand. She markets her fragrances online and on social media platforms. She also maintains a shop along Kenyatta Avenue in Nairobi's central business district. During the COVID-19 pandemic, instead of laying off her staff, she convinced them to accept half of their regular salary.

== Family ==
Waruguru is a mother to a son, who was born circa 2013.

== Other considerations ==
Prior to the outbreak of the COVID-19 pandemic, she expected to complete her examinations to become a captain on the Boeing 737 by the end of 2020.
