= Anglican Diocese of Makueni =

Anglican diocese in Kenya

The Diocese of Makueni is a diocese within Province of Kenya: it was created from the Anglican Diocese of Machakos in 2013 and the current bishops are The Rt Revd Joseph Mutungi and Francis Mboya Matui.
