= Samara University (Russia) =

Engineering and technical institutions in Russia

- Самарский национальный исследовательский университет имени академика С. П. Королёва
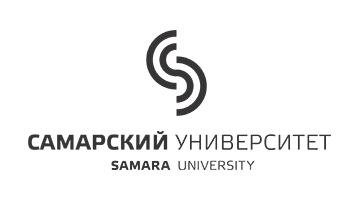
- Former names: Kuibyshev Aviation Institute (KuAI)
- Motto: Мы обгоним время!
- Motto in English: We'll be ahead of time!
- Type: Public
- Established: 1942
- Rector: E. V. Shakhmatov
- Academic staff: 1406
- Students: 16976
- Undergraduates: 16976
- Location: Samara, Russia; 53.2120°N 50.1776°E
- Website: www.ssau.ru

University rankings

Regional – Overall
- QS Emerging Europe and Central Asia: 110 (2022)

Samara University, officially Samara National Research University named after Academician S.P. Korolev, (Russian: Самарский национальный исследовательский университет имени академика С. П. Королёва) is a public university located in Samara, Russia. In 2022, it was ranked #581 in the world by QS World University Rankings, #1,201 in the world by World University Rankings by Times Higher Education, and #1,579 in the world by Webometrics.

== Structure ==
– Institutions: Space Engineering Institute, Aerospace Propulsion Institute, Aeronautical Engineering Institute, Electronics and Instrumentation Engineering Institute, Continuing Professional Education Institute, Continuing Professional Education Institute;

– Faculties: Industrial Engineering, Informational Science, Computer Science, Economics and Management, Basic Training and Fundamental Sciences and Correspondence Education;

– Research institutes: Research Institute of Machine Acoustics, Research Institute of Airframe constructions, Research Institute of Instrument-making, Research Institute of Technologies and Quality Problems, Research Institute of System Designing;

– 35 research laboratories and centers;

– Training airfield, research library, and public museum of aviation and cosmonautics;

– 9 dissertation councils for doctoral and master's theses.

== Rankings ==
In 2022, it was ranked #581 in the world by QS World University Rankings, #1,201 in the world by World University Rankings by Times Higher Education, and #1,579 in the world by Webometrics.

== History ==
Kuibyshev Aviation Institute (Kuai) formed in accordance with the order of the All-Union Committee on Higher Education in SNK for the military aviation industry designers in 1942. The first classes started in October 1942.

In 1957 Kuai began active development of space technology and the training of qualified specialists in this field. Employees of the Institute participated in the development of rocket, in particular, in the development of carrier rockets Soyuz, "Lightning" and "East" and "Peace" in preparation for space programs at the space station. In 1956 the Institute of management was taken over by the Hero of Socialist Labor, Professor VP Lukachёva that helped the university to go to the national level. On February 22, 1966 under the decree number 136 of the CC CPSU and the USSR Council of Ministers "On the perpetuation of the memory of Academician SP Korolev" Kuai was named after SP Korolev.

After the departure of VP Lukachёva in 1988, the new rector of Kuai was the future academician of the Russian Academy of Sciences Vladimir Pavlovich Shorin, but already in 1990 it was replaced by the new rector of Samara State Aerospace University Corresponding Member of the Russian Academy of Sciences Viktor Soifer. On January 25, 1991 the town was renamed Kuibyshev in Samara, in its historical name, in connection with what has been renamed and the institution itself. He was named Samara Aviation Institute, but on September 23, 1992, he received university status and since then is its Samara State Aerospace University (SSAU) name.

In 2009, the Samara State Aerospace University, along with other first 11 (from 39 in 2010) universities of the Russian Federation is the winner of the contest of national research universities. In July 2013 the University became one of 15 winners of the university increase the competitiveness of the project competition 5-100, the aim of which is to hit the Top 100 universities in the world ranking.

In 2015, Samara State University was integrated to and finally merged with Samara State Aerospace University under a single name Samara University. On April 6, 2016 the Ministry of Education and Science of the Russian Federation № 379 Federal State Autonomous Educational Institution of Higher Education "Samara State Aerospace University named after Academician SP Korolev (National Research University)," renamed the Federal State Autonomous Educational Institution of Higher Education "Samara national Research University named after academician SP Korolev "(abbreviated name -" Samara University "). Renaming and subject to SSAU branch in Toliatti. Also, the Ministry of Education of the Russian Federation approved changes to the charter of the University related to changes in the name of the university.

== Supervisory Board SSAU ==
The Supervisory Board is one of the university administration. The composition of the Supervisory Board includes:

- Dmitry Rogozin, Deputy Chairman of the RF Government;
- Nikolay Merkushkin, former governor of the Samara region;
- Zhores Ivanovich Alferov, Academician of the Russian Academy of Sciences, Nobel Prize winner;
- Igor Komarov, general director of JSC "United Rocket and Space Corporation";
- Edward F. Crawley, rector of the Skolkovo Institute of Science and Technology;
- Mikhail Pogosyan, president of JSC "United Aircraft Corporation"

== Notable alumni ==
- Alexander Brod, politician and human-rights activist
- Michal Klusáček, Czech politician
- Emily Orwaru, Kenyan aeronautical engineer
- Konstantin Titov, politician
- Dmitry Muratov, journalist, Nobel Peace Prize Laureate
