= Emily Orwaru =

Kenyan aeronautical engineer

- Born: 1988 (age 37–38); Kenya
- Citizenship: Kenya
- Education: Samara State Aerospace University (Bachelor of Engineering)
- Occupation: Aerospace engineer
- Years active: 2007–present
- Title: Aeronautical planning engineer at Kenya Airways

Emily Orwaru (born 1988) is a Kenyan aeronautical engineer, who works as an aeronautical planning engineer, at Kenya Airways, the country's national airline.

== Background and education ==
Orwaru was born in Nyamira in Nyamira County, about 305 kilometres (190 mi), by road, west of Nairobi, the capital and largest city of Kenya.

At the age of nine, she suffered from a bout of tonsillitis, which left her deaf in the right ear. Later, she was diagnosed with keratoconus, an eye condition characterized by thinning of the cornea in both eyes. She has to wear rigid contact lensed to correct the problem.

After attending elementary and high schools in Kenya, she benefited from a scholarship by the government of Russia, to attend Samara State Aerospace University, in Samara, Russia, where she studied Aerospace engineering, graduating with a Bachelor of Engineering (BEng) degree in 2009.

== Career ==
In June 2014, she was hired as an aircraft maintenance technician at Kenya Airways, working in that capacity for six months until December 2014. Later, she was promoted to her present position of aeronautical planning engineer.

== Other achievements and activities ==
In October 2017, Orwaru was named among the "Top 40 Under 40 Women in Kenya 2017" by Business Daily Africa, an English-language business daily newspaper, published by the Nation Media Group.

She is involved in a community-based economic development group in Nyamira, her home village. She is also a member of a cancer support group called Faraja Cancer Care.
