= Joseph Mutungi =

- Bishop
- Church: Anglican Church of Kenya
- Province: Kenya
- Diocese: Makueni, Machakos

Personal details
- Denomination: Anglican

Joseph Mutungi is an Anglican bishop: he has served as the Bishop of Makueni and Machakos in the Province of Kenya.
