= Irene Koki Mutungi =

Kenyan aviator (born 1974)

- Born: 1974 (age 51–52); Kenya
- Education: Kenya Civil Aviation Authority (private pilot's license); Oklahoma City Flight Schools (professional pilot's license)
- Occupation: Commercial pilot
- Years active: 1993–present
- Known for: First female pilot in Kenya
- Title: Captain of Boeing 787 Deamliner

Irene Koki Mutungi, commonly known as Koki Mutungi, is a professional pilot in Kenya, the largest economy in the East African Community. She was the first female on the African continent to become certified as a captain of the Boeing 787 "Dreamliner" aircraft. She flies for Kenya Airways, the national airline of Kenya.

== Early life and education ==
Irene Koki was born in November 1974 to Kenyan parents. Her father was a commercial pilot with Kenya Airways. He has since retired and is an aviation consultant.

Koki attended Moi Girls School Nairobi. After graduating high school in 1992 at age 17, she enrolled in flight school at Nairobi's Wilson Airport, where she obtained her private pilot's license. She continued her pilot education in Oklahoma City in the United States where she was awarded the commercial pilot's license, by the Federal Aviation Administration.

== Career ==
She returned to Kenya in 1995 and was hired by Kenya Airway, as their first female pilot. She was the only female pilot at the airline for the next six years.

In 2004, she became the first African woman to qualify to captain a commercial aircraft, when she qualified to command the Boeing 737. She has since qualified to command the Boeing 767. She then took a conversion course which allowed her to transition to commanding a Boeing 787 Dreamliner.Kenya Airways then promoted her to captain of the B787, making her the first African female Boeing 787 captain in the world. Her employer made that announcement on 15 April 2014.

Mutungi's motivation to become a commercial pilot was developed when she was five years old, by observing her father, a pilot for Kenya Airways at that time. Mutungi, who is the mother of one son born circa 2006, enjoys flying and mentoring others, especially female pilots.

In September 2014, she was one of 39 female pilots at Kenya Airways, out of a total of 530. She was the designated captain on the Nairobi to Paris route on the B787.

In December 2014, she was named among "The 20 Youngest Power Women In Africa 2014", by Forbes magazine.
