= Bonaero Park =

- Location within Gauteng Location within South Africa
- Coordinates: 26°7′23″S 28°15′20″E
- Country: South Africa
- Province: Gauteng
- Municipality: Ekurhuleni
- Main Place: Kempton Park

Area
  - Total: 3.13 km^{2} (1.21 sq mi)

Population (2011)
  - Total: 7,392
  - Density: 2,360/km^{2} (6,120/sq mi)

Racial makeup (2011)
  - Black African: 19.3%
  - Coloured: 2.1%
  - Indian/Asian: 3.3%
  - White: 73.9%
  - Other: 1.4%

First languages (2011)
  - Afrikaans: 55.7%
  - English: 29.2%
  - Zulu: 2.9%
  - Northern Sotho: 2.7%
  - Other: 9.4%
- Time zone: UTC+2 (SAST)
- Postal code (street): 1619
- PO box: 1622

Bonaero Park is a southeastern suburb of Kempton Park, Ekurhuleni, in Gauteng province, South Africa. It lies directly next to OR Tambo International Airport, the busiest airport in Africa. Bonaero Park was built in the 1960s to house employees from the nearby military aircraft factory owned by Atlas Aircraft Corporation. In 1992 Atlas was absorbed into a new entity known as Denel, becoming part of Denel Aviation.

== Economy ==
Toyota South Africa has constructed their new parts distribution centre for Southern Africa in Bonaero Park costing 363 million rand. The 42,000 m^{2} facility supplies local dealerships with replacement parts and also provides parts to 70 international destinations where South African vehicles are sold. By 2015 the second phase will be completed adding 38,000 m^{2} to the existing facility making it the largest of its kind in Africa.

At one time Airlink's head office was also in Bonaero Park. In 2009 Airlink leased space in the Greenstone Office Park in Modderfontein, Johannesburg.
