= Kenya Airways =

Flag carrier of Kenya

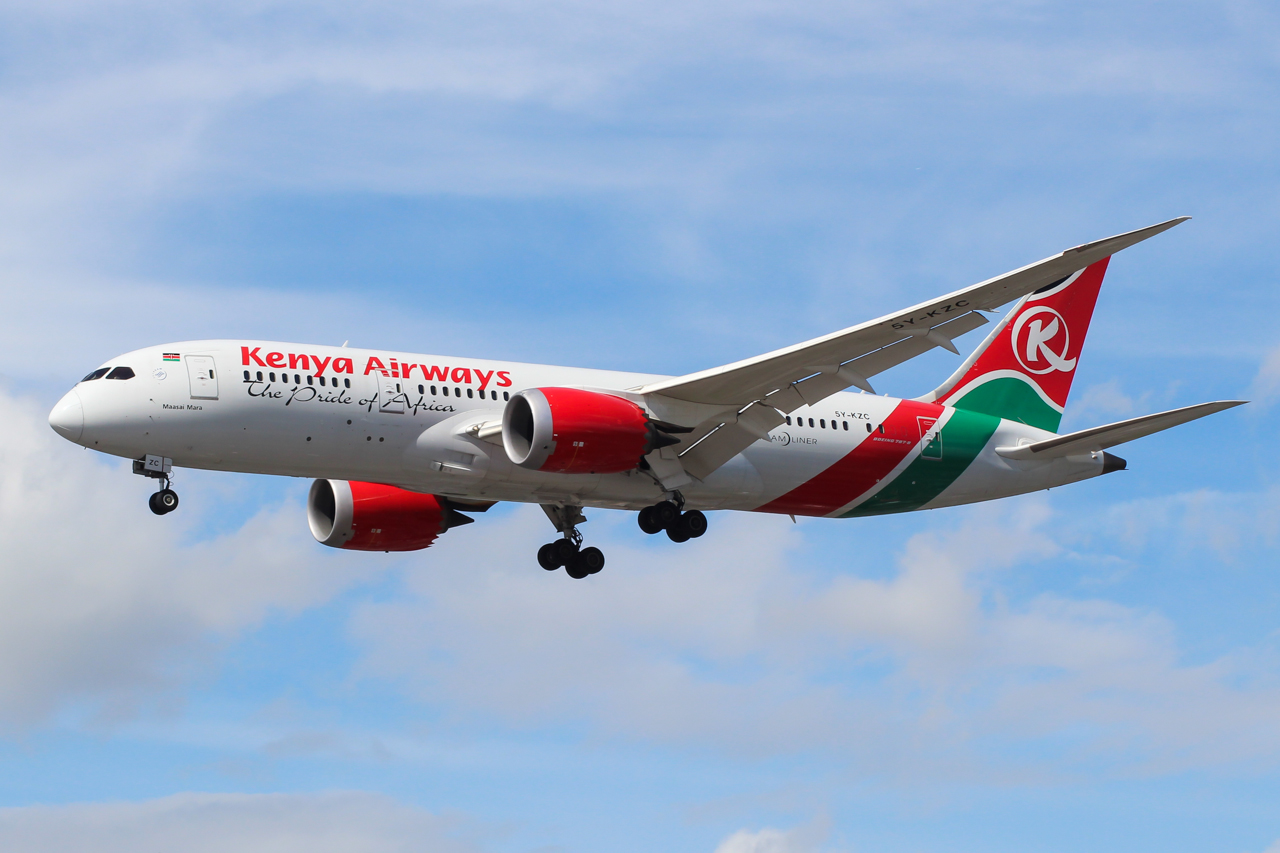
- Kenya Airways Boeing 787-8
IATA	ICAO	Call sign
KQ	KQA	KENYA
- Founded: 22 January 1977; 49 years ago
- Commenced operations: 4 February 1977; 49 years ago
- Hubs: Jomo Kenyatta International Airport
- Frequent-flyer program: Asante Rewards
- Alliance: SkyTeam
- Subsidiaries: African Cargo Handling Limited (100%); Jambojet (100%); Kenya Airfreight Handling Limited (51%)
- Fleet size: 37
- Destinations: 44
- Headquarters: Embakasi, Nairobi, Kenya
- Key people: Michael Joseph (Chairman); Habil Waswani (acting CEO)
- Revenue: ▲KSh 18 billion (US$139.2million) (FY 2024)
- Operating income: ▲KSh 10,531 million (US$80.38 million) (FY 2023)
- Profit: ▲KSh 5.4 billion shillings (US$42.82 million) (FY 2024)
- Total assets: ▲KSh 176,613 million (FY 2023)
- Employees: 3,825 (2022)
- Website: www.kenya-airways.com/ke/

Kenya Airways Ltd., more commonly known as Kenya Airways, is the flag carrier airline of Kenya. The company was founded in 1977, after the dissolution of East African Airways. Its head office is located in Embakasi, Nairobi, with its hub at Jomo Kenyatta International Airport.

The airline was owned by the Government of Kenya until April 1995, and was privatised in 1996, becoming the first African flag carrier to successfully do so. Kenya Airways is currently a public-private partnership. The largest shareholder is the Government of Kenya (48.9%), with 38.1% being owned by KQ Lenders Company 2017 Ltd (in turn owned by a consortium of banks), followed by KLM, which has a 7.8% stake in the company. Private owners hold the rest of the shares; shares are traded on the Nairobi Stock Exchange, the Dar es Salaam Stock Exchange, and the Uganda Securities Exchange.

The airline became a member of SkyTeam in June 2010, and has been a member of the African Airlines Association since 1977.

== History ==
=== Early years ===
Kenya Airways was established by the Government of Kenya on 22 January 1977, following the break-up of the East African Community and the consequent demise of East African Airways (EAA). On 4 February 1977, two Boeing 707-321s leased from British Midland Airways inaugurated operations, serving the Nairobi–Frankfurt–London route. On internal and regional flights, the carrier deployed aircraft formerly operated by the EAA consortium, such as one Douglas DC-9-52 and three Fokker F-27-200s. (Note: Flight International also reported that Kenya Airways flew Douglas DC-9-32s previously operated by EAA.) In late 1977, three Boeing 707s were acquired from Northwest Orient. The following year, the company formed a charter subsidiary named Kenya Flamingo Airlines, which leased aircraft from the parent airline in order to operate international passenger and cargo services. Aer Lingus provided the company with technical and management support in the early years.

=== 1980s–1990s ===
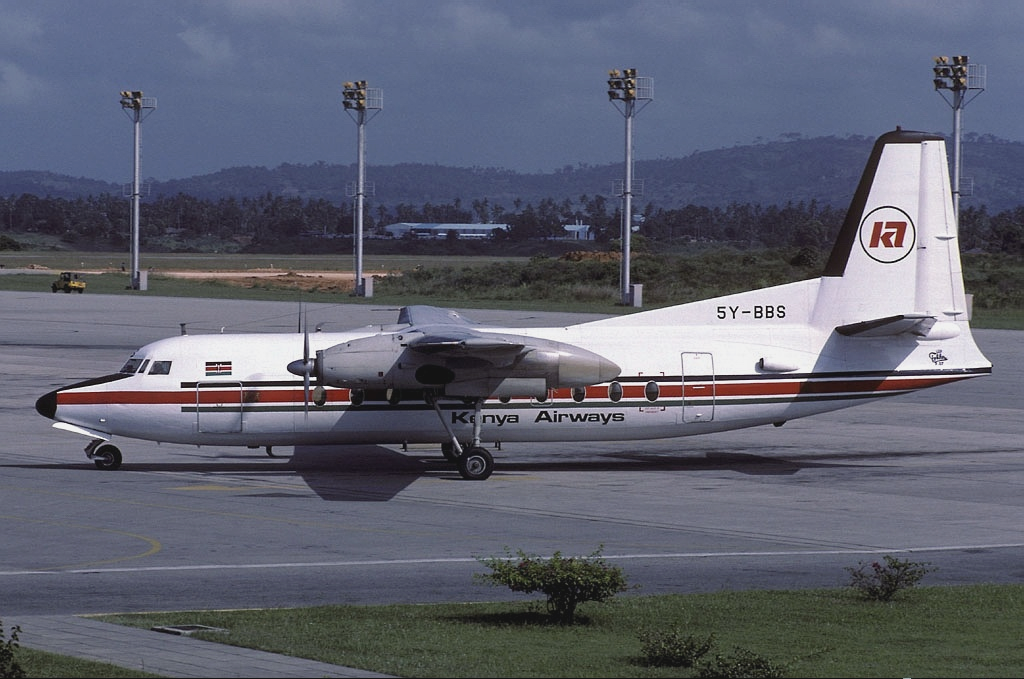
Kenya Airways Fokker F27-200 at Moi International Airport in 1982

In July 1980, the airline had 2,100 employees and a fleet of three Boeing 707-320Bs, one Boeing 720B, one Douglas DC-9-30 and three Fokker F-27-200s. At this time, Addis Ababa, Athens, Bombay, Cairo, Copenhagen, Frankfurt, Jeddah, Kampala, Karachi, Khartoum, London, Lusaka, Mauritius, Mogadishu, Rome, Salisbury, Seychelles and Zürich were among the airline's international destinations, whereas domestic routes radiated from Nairobi to Kisumu, Malindi, Mombasa and Mumias. A Nairobi–Bombay nonstop route was launched in 1982 using Boeing 707-320Bs. A year later, the company commenced serving Tanzania while flights to Burundi, Malawi and Rwanda were launched in 1984. Capacity on the European routes was boosted in November 1985 with the incorporation of an Airbus A310-200 leased from Condor. Kilimanjaro was first served in March 1986. That year, the airline ordered two Airbus A310-300s. Kenya Airways was the first African carrier to acquire the type and was the first wide-bodies ordered by the company. Funded with a US$20,000,000 (equivalent to $58,743,169 in 2025) loan, the delivery of these two aircraft took place in May and September 1986. They flew on the Kenya–Europe corridor, and permitted Kenya Airways to return the A310-200 to the lessor. In early 1988, the carrier ordered two Fokker 50s; for domestic routes, the airline received the first of these aircraft at the end of the year. Also in 1988, the lease of a third Airbus A310-300 was arranged with the International Lease Finance for a ten-year period; the aircraft joined the fleet in November 1989. Leased from Ansett Worldwide, the first Boeing 757-200 was received in January 1990, whereas a third Fokker 50 was acquired in October 1990. By late 1991, two Boeing 737-200s had been leased from Guinness Peat Aviation.

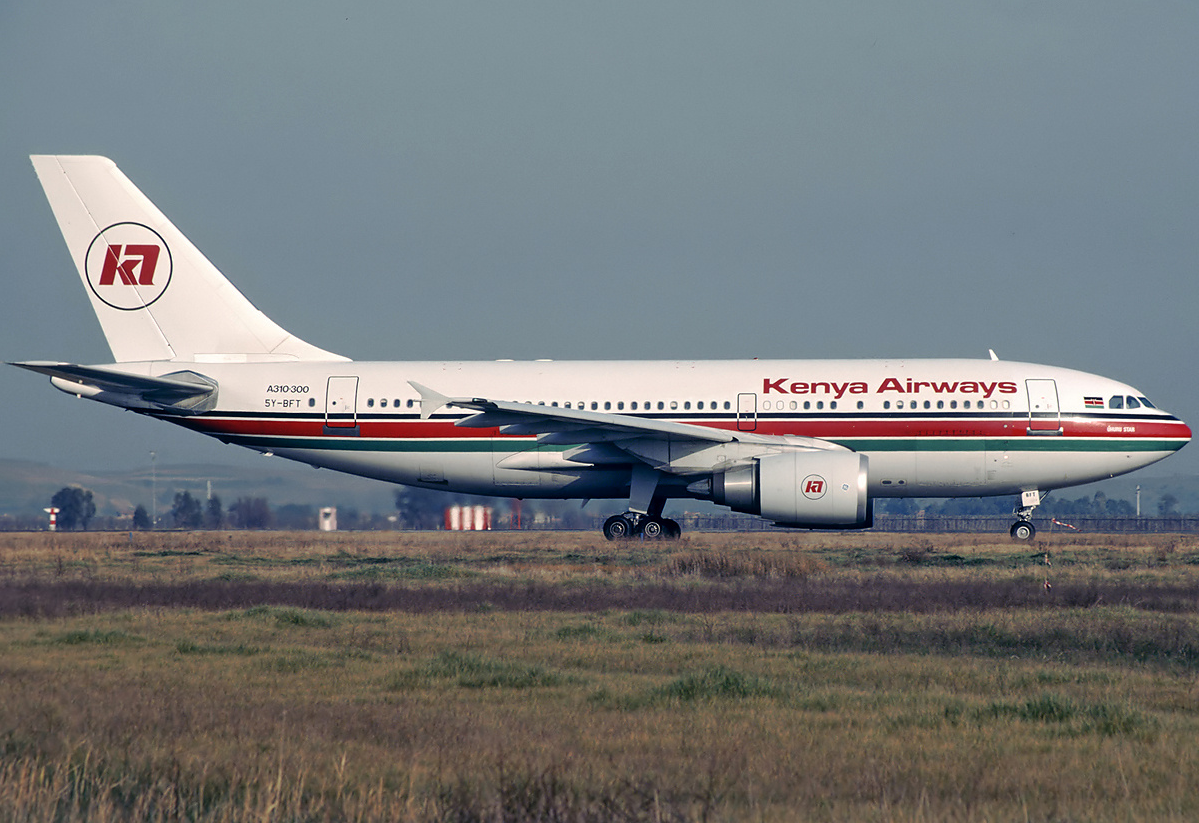
Kenya Airways Airbus A310-300 at Fiumicino Airport in 1999. With registration 5Y-BFT, this particular aircraft entered the fleet in November 1989.

In 1986, Sessional Paper Number 1 was published by the Government of Kenya, outlining the country's need for economic development and growth. The document stressed the government's opinion that the airline would be better off privately owned, thus resulting in the first privatisation attempt. The government named Philip Ndegwa as chairman of the board in 1991, with specific orders to make the airline a privately owned company. In 1992, the Public Enterprise Reform paper was published, giving Kenya Airways priority among national companies in Kenya to be privatised. Ndegwa was succeeded by Isaac Omolo Okero. In September 1992, Brian Davies was appointed as the new Managing Director of the company. Davies had been previously hired to carry out a study of viability on privatisation, working for British Airways' Speedwing consulting arm. Swissair was the first company to provide Kenya Airways with privatisation advice. In the fiscal year 1993 to 1994, the airline produced its first profit since the start of commercialisation. In 1994, the International Finance Corporation was appointed to assist in the privatisation process, which effectively began in 1995. A large aviation industry partner was sought to acquire 40% of the shares, with another 40% reserved for private investors and the government keeping the remaining stake. The government would absorb almost US$90 million in debts and would convert another US$31 million it provided in loans into equity; after reorganisation, the company would have a debt of approximately US$78 million. British Airways, KLM, Lufthansa and South African Airways were among the airlines to express interest in taking a stake in Kenya Airways.

KLM purchased a 26% shareholding, becoming the largest shareholder. Shares were floated to the public in March 1996, and the airline started trading in the Nairobi Stock Exchange. The Government of Kenya kept a 23% stake in the company, and offered the remaining 51% to the public; however, non-Kenyan shareholders could hold a maximum 49% share of the airline. Despite 40% of the shares being kept by foreign investors following privatisation (including KLM's 26% stake), top management positions were held by Kenyans. Following the takeover, the government of Kenya capitalised US$70 million, while the airline was awarded a US$15 million loan from the International Finance Corporation to modernise its fleet. In a deal worth US$82 million, two Boeing 737-300s were ordered in July 1996.

=== 2000s–2010s ===
In January 2000, the airline experienced its first fatal accident when an Airbus A310 that had been bought new in 1986 crashed off Ivory Coast, shortly after taking off from Abidjan. By April the same year, the fleet consisted of four Airbus A310-300s, (Note: It is likely that Flight International records had not been updated at the time of publish. Another source informed that the number of A310s in the fleet immediately after the crash was three.) two Boeing 737-200 Advanced and four Boeing 737-300s. At this time the company had a staff of 2,780, including 400 engineers, 146 flight crew and 365 cabin crew. From its main hub at Jomo Kenyatta International Airport, scheduled services were operated to Abidjan, Addis Ababa, Amsterdam, Bujumbura, Cairo, Copenhagen, Dar es Salaam, Douala, Dubai, Eldoret, Entebbe/Kampala, Harare, Johannesburg, Karachi, Khartoum, Kigali, Kinshasa, Lagos, Lilongwe, Lokichoggio, London, Lusaka, Mahe Island, Malindi, Mombasa, Mumbai, and Zanzibar. In 2002, an order for three Boeing 777-200ERs was placed with Boeing; an additional aircraft of the type was acquired in November 2005. In March 2006, six Boeing 787-8s were ordered; the first two examples would be delivered in 2010 and the rest in 2011. The original Boeing 787 order was amended nine months later to include three more aircraft of the type. The first Embraer E190 joined the fleet in December 2010.

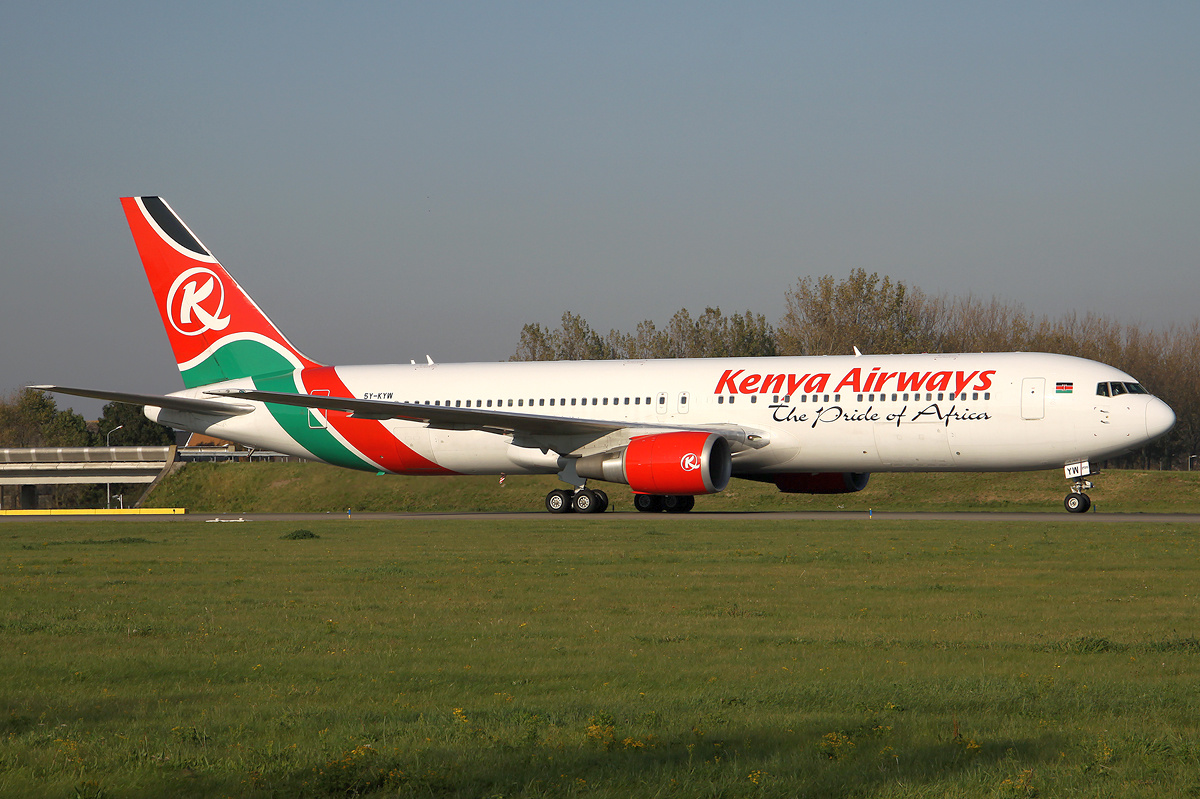
Kenya Airways Boeing 767 in 2011

In June 2012, the company announced the issuance of rights worth KSh.20 billion/=, aimed at increasing capital to support expansion plans. Following the allocation of shares, KLM increased their stake in the company from 26% to 26.73%, while the Kenyan government boosted their participation into the company from 23% to 29.8%, becoming the largest shareholder. In April 2012, the airline launched a plan named Project Mawingu (the Swahili word meaning Clouds) to add 24 destinations by 2021, including the start of services to Australia and North and South America, and expanding its presence in Asia as well. In October 2013, the airline stated that it will add six new destinations every year, following the delivery of Boeing 777s and 787s the carrier has on order.

Operational results for fiscal years 2015 and 2016 showed substantial losses. The rapid expansion of the fleet and routes (dubbed "Project Mawingu") was cited as the primary cause of the downturn. Fuel-price hedging and the 1996 agreement with KLM, considered intrusive in the running of the flag carrier, took secondary blame. Corrective measures were taken to improve the financial and operational position of the airline and avert insolvency. The route partnership with KLM was deemed profitable thus, kept. However, the parties agreed to amend some features of the deal that hurt KQ -IATA code for Kenya Airways. Two Boeing 737-700 were sold and five newer, leased airliners were sub-leased to improve cash flow. Efforts to financially re-position the carrier were successful at the end of 2017. In a complex deal, stakeholders agreed to convert close to half a billion US dollars in equity loans, changing the ownership structure. The government of Kenya, the biggest lender, saw its holdings rise from 29.8% to 48.9% while that of KLM was diluted from 26.7% down to 7.8%. A consortium of local banks, through a special-purpose vehicle called: "KQ Lenders Company 2017 Ltd.", ended up with 38.1%. The latter entity is obligated with a loan from the above local banks for US$225 million; this amount, in turn, is guaranteed by the government. The airline's employees, through a shareholding scheme, and others own the remaining 5.2%. The Government of Kenya issued a guarantee for a further US$525 million debt owed to Import-Export Bank of the United States, financier of the newer Boeing planes of its fleet. In a bid to recover their exposure, syndicated leaseholders and banks unsuccessfully fought these measures to restructure the carrier's ownership.

An outline of a plan to restore profitability was disclosed in a March 2018 interview given by the CEO and the chairman of the company. The turnaround operation will include route expansion, pursuing the high-end segment of the market, on partnerships and joint ventures with other airlines. The carrier plans to add up to twenty new destinations in Africa, Europe and Asia in the next five years. Five sub-leased aircraft are to re-join the fleet by the end of 2019 to facilitate this move. Preparations are underway to roll out an economy-plus class to target the business and high-end leisure travellers. Direct flights to luxury tourism destinations in the Indian Ocean are also planned. Talks are underway with South African Airways regarding route-sharing and aircraft-maintenance collaboration; this is the other focus of the turnaround scheme. In December 2018 Kenya Airways revealed plans to start flights between Nairobi and Windhoek, Namibia.

=== 2020s ===
The airline announced plans to undergo a $1 billion restructuring in 2021 to help it recover from the COVID-19 pandemic. Upon announcing major losses in 2022, the carrier announced plans to cut ties with the Kenyan government by the end of 2023.

In 2024, passenger numbers grew by 10% to 2.54 million, with an expanded capacity leading to a revenue increase of 22% to Ksh91 billion, The airline's capacity, measured in Available Seat Kilometers (ASKs), increased by 16% to 7.991 billion ASKs, while revenue passenger kilometers (RPKs) improved by 14%.

In March 2025, Kenya Airways reported a pre-tax profit of $42.82 million.

== Corporate affairs ==
=== Business trends ===
The key trends for the Kenya Airways group over recent years are shown below (to 31 March until 2017; periods ending 31 December thereafter):

	Turnover (KSh bn)	Profit before tax (EBT) (KSh bn)	Net profit (KSh bn)	Number of employees	Number of passengers (m)	Passenger load factor (%)	Cargo carried (000s tonnes)	Number of aircraft (Note: at year end, excluding dormant and leased/sub-leased)	Notes/references
2010	70.7	2.6		4,133	2.9	66.5		27	
2011	85.8	5.0		4,355	3.1	69.2		31	
2012	107	2.1		4,834	3.6	71.7		34	
2013	98.8	−10.8		4,006	3.7	68.7		43	
2014	106	−4.8		3,989	3.7	65.6		47	
2015	110	−29.7		4,002	4.2	63.6		52	
2016	116	−26.0	−29.7	3,870	4.2	68.3		47	
2017 (Mar)	106	−10.2	−9.9	3,582	4.5	72.3		46	
2017 (Dec)	80.7	−6.3	−6.4	3,548	3.4	76.2		47	9 months
2018	114	−7.5	−7.5	3,905	4.8	77.6		45	
2019	128	−12.9	−12.9	3,816	4.4	77.0	68.2	42	
2020	52.8	−36.5	−36.2	3,652	1.8	65.3	49.4	42	(Note: 2020: Activities and income in fiscal 2020 were severely reduced by the impact of the coronavirus pandemic.)
2021	70.2	−16.0	−15.8	3,544	2.2	60.8	63.7	40	
2022	116	−38.3	−38.2	3,825	3.7	74.5	65.9	39	
2023	178	−22.8	−22.6	4,342	5.0	78.4	56.5	40	
2024	188	5.53	5.4	4,828	5.23	75.2	70.0	35	

=== Subsidiaries and associates ===
Low-cost carrier Jambojet, created in 2013, and African Cargo Handling Limited are both wholly owned subsidiaries of Kenya Airways.

Partly owned companies include Kenya Airfreight Handling Limited, dedicated to the cargo handling of perishable goods (51%-owned) and Tanzanian carrier Precision Air (41.23%-owned).

=== Key people ===
As of August 2023, Allan Kilavuka held both the Group Managing Director and CEO position. Kilavuka was appointed as Kenya Airways Group's acting CEO in December 2019, succeeding Sebastian Mikosz, who resigned amid nationalisation plans for the airline. Mikosz, formerly CEO of LOT Polish Airlines, had taken office as Kenya Airways Group's managing director and CEO on 1 June 2017. Kilavuka was later confirmed in the substantive role. In December 2025, Kilavuka was replaced in the roles of managing director and CEO by former COO George Kamal. As of September 2026, Habil Waswani held the acting CEO position, succeeding George Kamal.

== Destinations ==
Kenya Airways serves 44 destinations with 61 different routes, as of August 2023.

=== Alliances ===
KLM sponsored Kenya Airways' SkyTeam candidacy process in mid-2005. In September 2007, Kenya Airways became one of the first official SkyTeam Associate Airline and achieved full membership in June 2010. The alliance provides Kenya Airways' passengers with access to the member airlines' worldwide network and passenger facilities.

=== Codeshare agreements ===
Kenya Airways has codeshare agreements with the following airlines:

- Aeroflot
- Air Austral
- Air Burkina
- Air France
- Air India
- Air Mauritius
- British Airways
- China Eastern Airlines
- China Southern Airlines
- Congo Airways
- Delta Air Lines
- EgyptAir
- Etihad Airways
- Garuda Indonesia
- ITA Airways
- Jambojet
- KLM
- Korean Air
- LAM Mozambique Airlines
- Precision Air
- Qatar Airways
- Royal Air Maroc
- Saudia
- South African Airways
- TAAG Angola Airlines
- Vietnam Airlines
- Virgin Atlantic

== Fleet ==
=== Current fleet ===
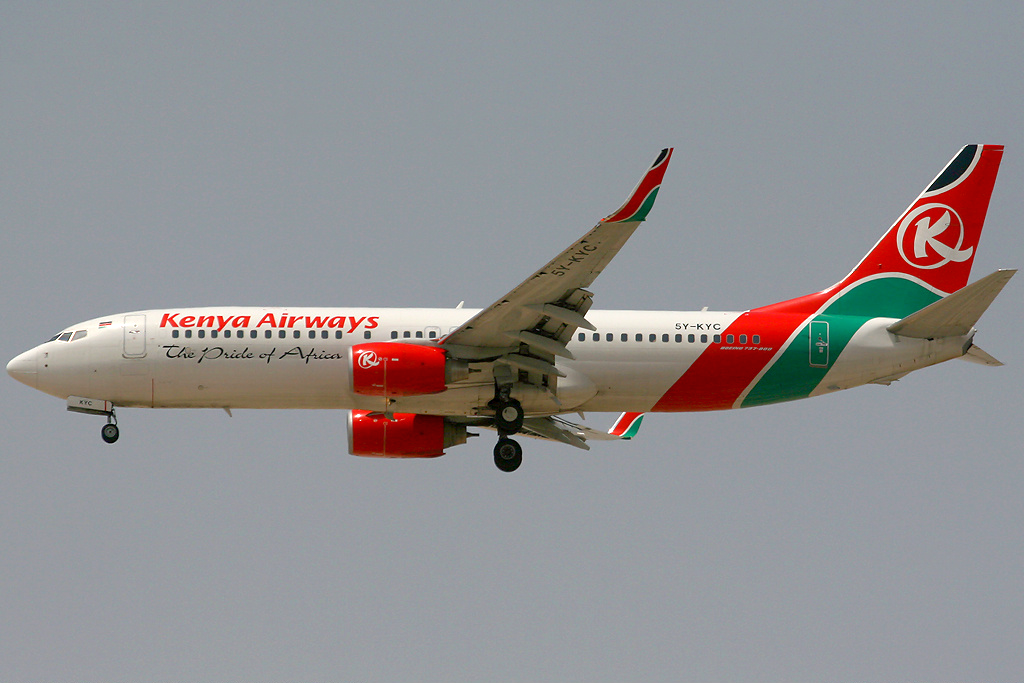
Kenya Airways Boeing 737-800

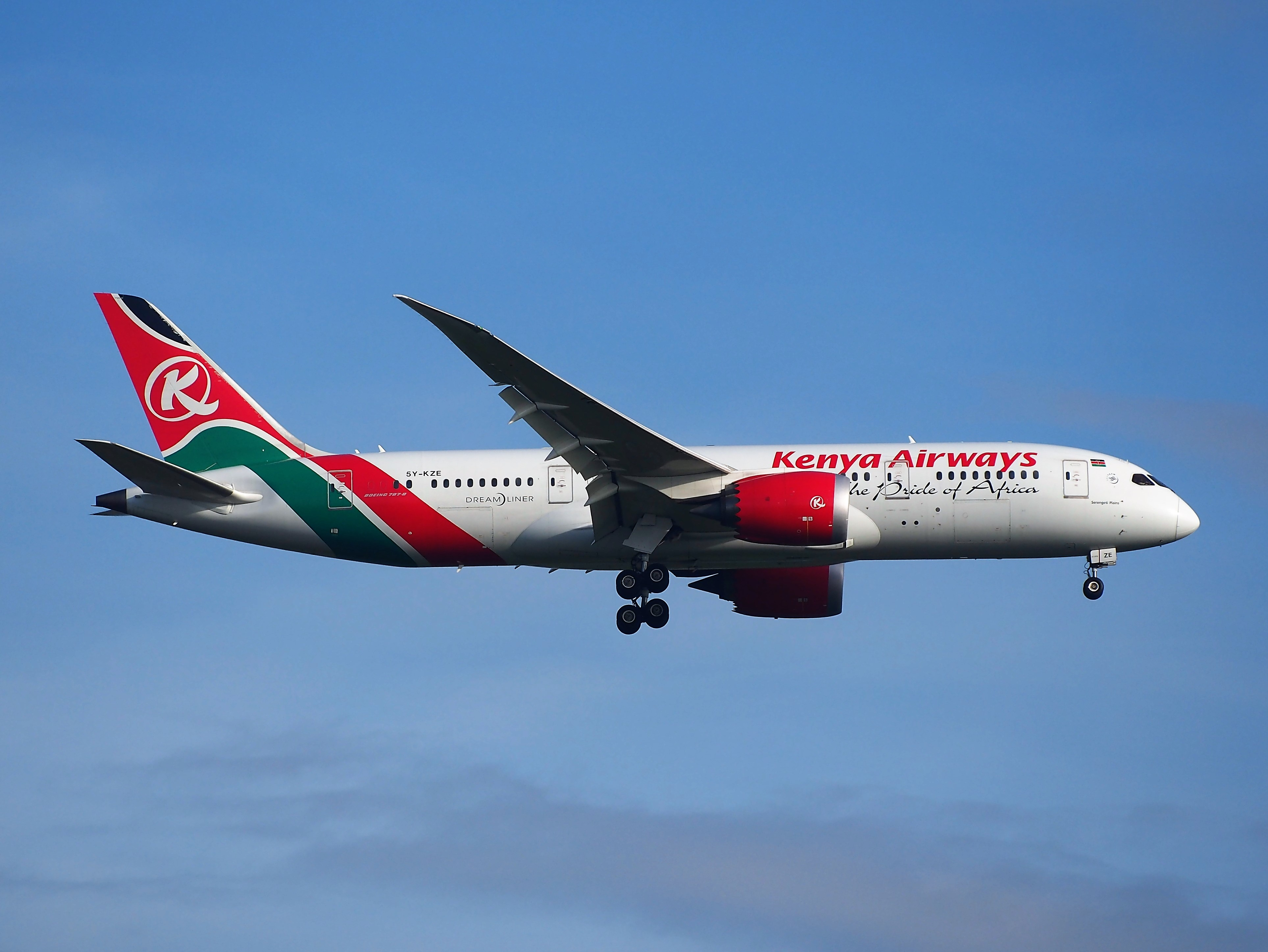
Kenya Airways Boeing 787-8

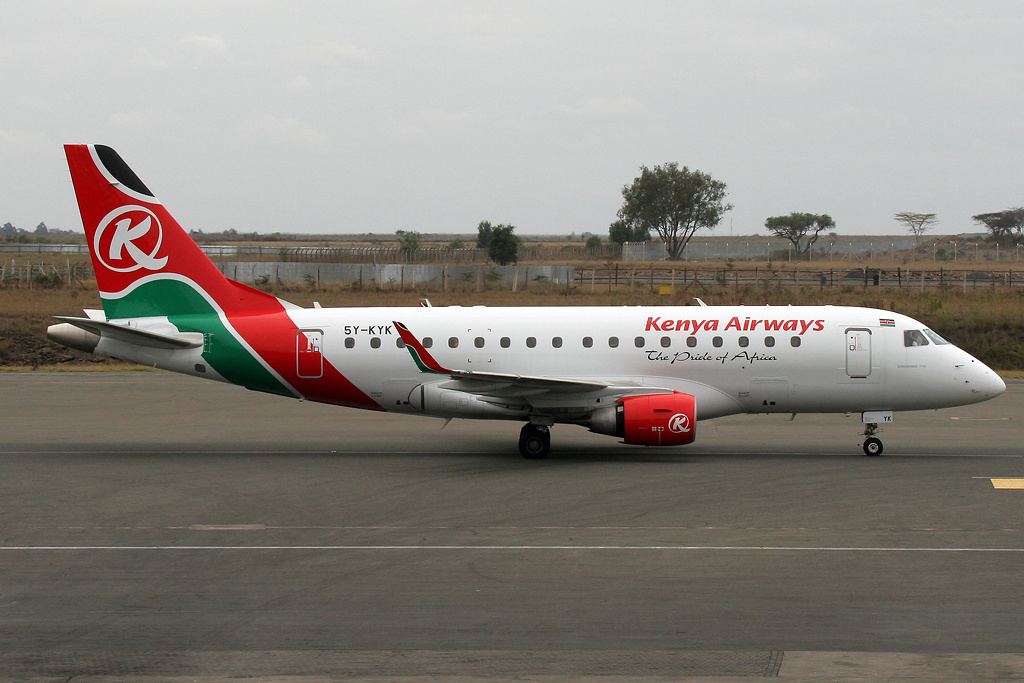
A former Kenya Airways Embraer E170 in 2007

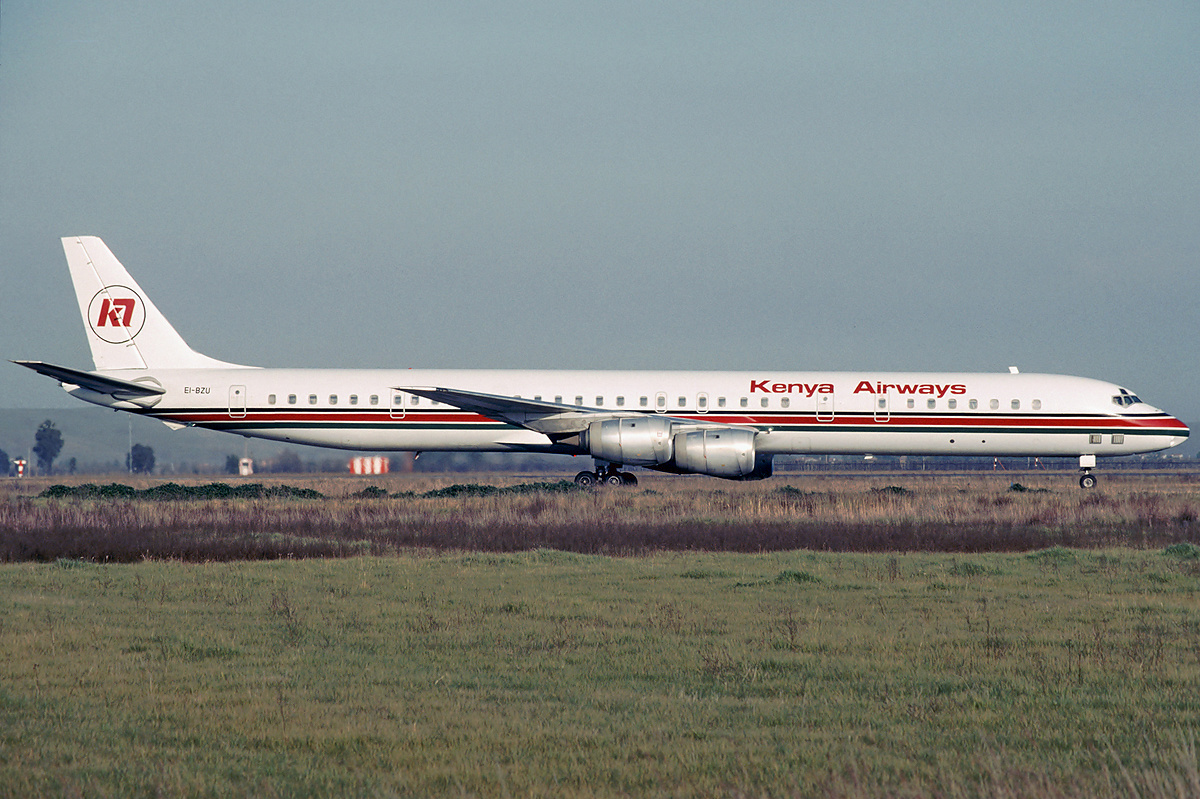
A leased Douglas DC-8-70 in 1990

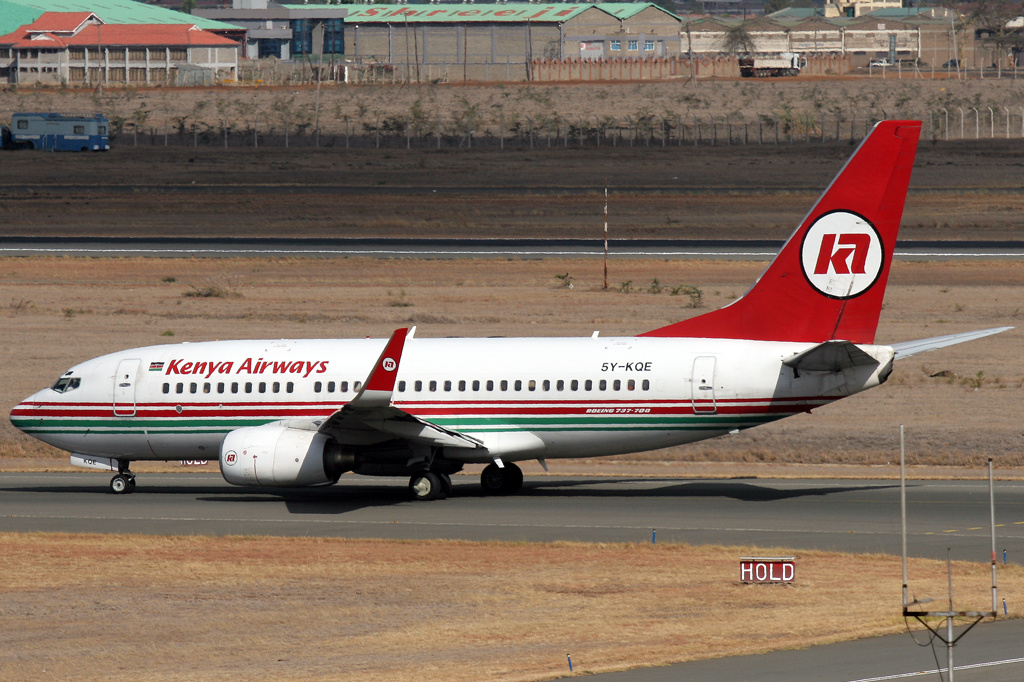
A former Kenya Airways Boeing 737-700 wearing an older livery

As of July 2026, Kenya Airways operates the following aircraft:

Kenya Airways fleet
Aircraft	In service	Orders	Passengers			Notes
Aircraft	In service	Orders	J	Y	Total	Notes
Boeing 737-800	9	—	16	129	145	
Boeing 787-8	9	—	30	204	234	
Boeing 777-300ER	1	—	—	—	400	First of three aircraft returned from lease to Turkish Airlines
Embraer E190	15	—	12	84	96	
Kenya Airways Cargo fleet
Boeing 737-300SF	2	—	Cargo			
Boeing 737-800SF	2	—	Cargo			
Boeing 767-300BCF	1	1	Cargo			
Total	39	1				

=== Developments in 2010s–2020s and future plans ===
The first of four converted Boeing 737-300s was delivered to the company in April 2013; Kenya Airways planned to fly this aircraft on African routes served by the Embraer E190s, to boost cargo capacity. The company took delivery of its first Boeing 777-300ER in October 2013.

Kenya Airways had nine Boeing 787s on order as of April 2011, although the company considered cancelling the order after systematic delays with the delivery dates. The handover of the first Boeing 787 took place on 4 April 2014. Two days later, Nairobi–Paris became the first route to be served by the Boeing 787.

Kenya Airways phased out its Boeing 777s in May 2015 after the airline made losses and incurred debts in the previous financial year. The Boeing 777-300ER fleet was leased to Turkish Airlines in May 2016.

In 2022, the airline announced a plan to downsize its fleet. In 2023, the airline announced plans to retire all non-Boeing aircraft and become an all-Boeing airline.

On 20 December 2023, Kenya Airways announced that they had secured an agreement with Hi Fly Malta for an additional aircraft to enhance operational capacity and flexibility for the peak travel season, being delivered on 20 December, and completing its first flight for the airline a day later, operating KQ310, from Nairobi to Dubai.

The airline took delivery of its first Boeing 737-800SF in November 2023; the aircraft was deployed on revenue service in February 2024.

Kenya Airways has unveiled a $400 million (KSh 51-52 billion) five-year fleet expansion strategy aimed at increasing its aircraft count from 34 to 53 planes by 2029. The investment will fund both new aircraft acquisitions and modernization of existing fleet, including cabin upgrades like in-flight Wi-Fi installation and enhanced interior features to improve passenger experience. CEO Allan Kilavuka emphasized this move is critical for boosting operational efficiency and competitiveness amid industry-wide aircraft shortages, noting that global supply chain delays have already impacted deliveries—such as receiving only one of six planned Boeing 767s this year.

The expansion faces significant hurdles, including multi-year delays in new aircraft production due to global supply constraints and maintenance challenges that have grounded part of its current fleet (including Boeing 787s). To execute this plan, Kenya Airways is seeking flexible lease arrangements and urging government support to secure a strategic investor, as highlighted by outgoing Chairman Michael Joseph. The initiative aligns with the airline's broader financial turnaround efforts after posting a KES 5.4 billion profit in 2024, driven by its Project Kifaru restructuring program.

=== Historical fleet ===
The company has previously operated the following aircraft:

- Airbus A310-200
- Airbus A310-300
- ATR 42-300
- Boeing 707-320
- Boeing 707-320B
- Boeing 707-320C
- Boeing 720B
- Boeing 737-200
- Boeing 737-200C
- Boeing 737-300
- Boeing 737-700
- Boeing 747-100
- Boeing 747-200B
- Boeing 757
- Boeing 767-300
- Boeing 767-300ER
- Boeing 777-200ER
- Boeing 777-300ER
- Douglas DC-8-70
- Embraer 170
- Fokker F27-200
- Fokker 50
- McDonnell Douglas DC-9-30
- McDonnell Douglas DC-10-30

=== Livery ===
In 2005, Kenya Airways changed its livery. The four multicolored stripes running all through the length of the fuselage were replaced by the company slogan Pride of Africa, whereas the KA tail logo was replaced by a styled K encircled with a Q to evoke the airline's IATA airline code.

== Services ==
=== Frequent flyer programmes ===
Former Kenya Airways' frequent flyer programme Msafiri was merged with KLM's Flying Dutchman in 1997, which was in turn merged with that of Air France and rebranded as Flying Blue in 2005, following the fusion of both companies. Gold Elite and Platinum Elite members of the Flying Blue programme are offered the JV Lounge. This service is provided to Kenya Airways passengers, and to passengers flying with its partner airlines as well. Simba Lounge is a service provided to Kenya Airways Business passengers only. Both lounges are located at Jomo Kenyatta International Airport.

=== In-flight entertainment ===
Different in-flight entertainment is available depending upon the aircraft and the class travelled. The airline's in-flight magazine is called Msafiri, and is distributed among the passengers in all aircraft, irrespective of the class.

- Boeing 787-8

Premier World entertainment is AVOD; NVOD is offered in Economy class.

- Boeing 737-800

These aircraft offer overhead screens in both classes, plus eight channels of audio.

- Embraer 190

These aircraft offer individual in-seat touchscreens.

== Accidents and incidents ==
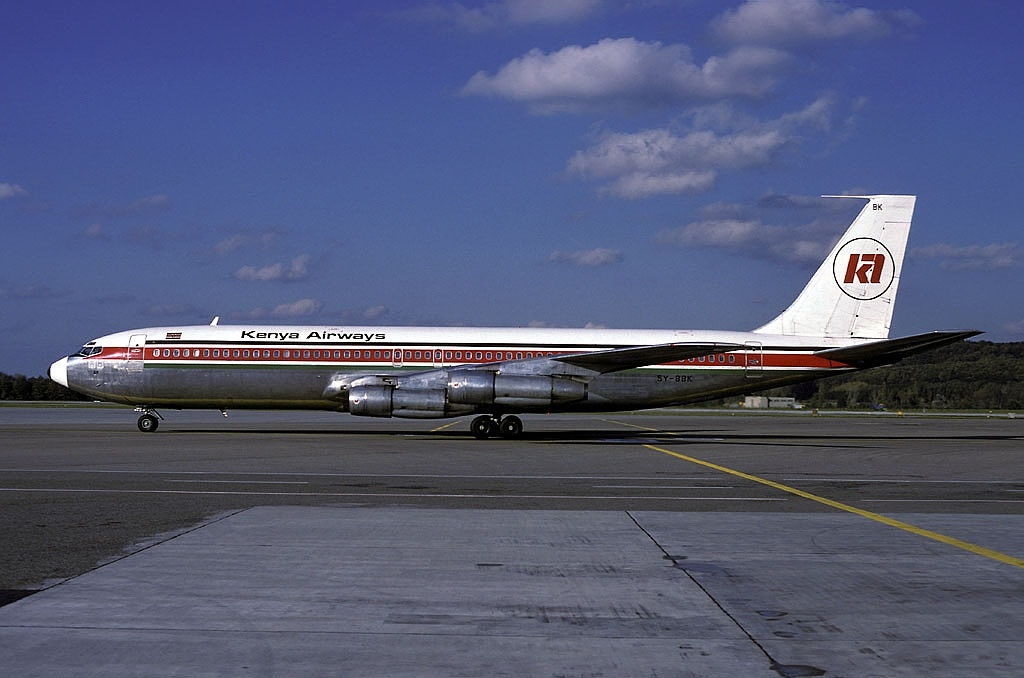
5Y-BBK, a Kenya Airways Boeing 707-320B in 1986, was damaged beyond economical repair on 11 July 1989, in an accident at Bole International Airport.

Kenya Airways has had two fatal accidents and six hull-loss accidents.

- 10 July 1988: A Fokker F27-200, registration 5Y-BBS, approached the runway too fast and made a belly landing at Kisumu Airport inbound from Nairobi as Flight 650, skidding down the runway for some 600 m (2,000 ft).
- 11 July 1989: A Boeing 707-320B, registration 5Y-BBK, overran the runway at Bole International Airport following a brake failure. The aircraft had departed from the same airport, and the non-retraction of the landing gear prompted the crew to return.
- 30 January 2000: Flight 431 was a scheduled Abidjan–Lagos–Nairobi service, operated with an Airbus A310-304, registration 5Y-BEN, that plunged into the Atlantic Ocean and broke up, about a minute after taking off from Abidjan's Félix Houphouët-Boigny International Airport. There were 179 people aboard, including a crew of ten; most of the occupants were Nigerians. 169 people were killed.
- 5 May 2007: Flight 507, operated by a Boeing 737-800, tail number 5Y-KYA, crashed into a mangrove swamp immediately after takeoff for Nairobi, about 5.5 kilometres (3.42 mi) southeast of Douala International Airport. The flight originated in Abidjan, with a stopover in Douala to pick up passengers. All 114 people on board (105 passengers and nine crew) were killed.

== See also ==
- Air France–KLM
- Airlines of Africa
- Emily Orwaru, aeronautical engineer
- Irene Koki Mutungi, first female Kenya Airways captain
- Transport in Kenya
- Wanjiku Mugane, member of the board of Kenya Airways

== Bibliography ==
- Guttery, Ben R. (1998). Encyclopedia of African Airlines. Jefferson, NC: McFarland & Company. ISBN 978-0-7864-0495-7.
