= List of defunct airlines of the United Arab Emirates =

This is a list of now defunct airlines of the United Arab Emirates.

Airline	Image	IATA	ICAO	Callsign	Commenced operations	Ceased operations	Notes
Aerovista Gulf Express			VGF		2004	2008	
Air Cess			ACS				
Air Gulf Falcon		QL	GLN	GULF FALCON	1999	2003	
Al Jaber Aviation			LJB	AL JABER	2004	2019	
Al Rais Cargo			HJT	AL-RAIS CARGO	1983	2008	
Amiri Flight		MO	AUH		1985	2009	Rebranded as Presidential Flight Authority
AVE.com		2E	PHW	PHOENIX SHARJAH	2005	2012	
British Gulf International Airlines			BGI	BRITISH GULF	1996	2012	
Cargo Plus Aviation		8L	CGP		2001		
Dana Executive Jets			DEJ	DANA JET	2006	????	
Dolphin Air		ZD	FDN	FLYING DOLPHIN	1996	2008	
Eastern SkyJets		EE	ESJ	EASTERN SKYJETS	2004	2016	
Emirates Air Services		RF			1976	1994	Rebranded as Abu Dhabi Aviation
Experts Air Cargo					2004	2006	Rebranded as Maximus Air
Falcon Express Cargo Airlines		FC	FCX	Falcon Cargo	1995	2012	
Fly RAK			FRB		2012	2012	
Flying Dolphin Airlines			FDN		1998	1999	Renamed/merged to Dolphin Air
Fujairah Airlines				FIATS			
Gaylan Air Cargo					1980	1981	
Global Charter Services					2011	2012	
Global Jet			GBG	GLOBAL GULF			
Hamarein Air			HMM		1976	1979	
HeavyLift International		HC	HVL		2004	2011	
Jupiter Airlines			JUA	JUPITERAIRLINES LIMITED	1996	2010	
Kang Pacific Airlines					2006	2007	
Kinshasa Airways			KNS	KINSHASA AIRWAYS	2002	2010	
Lotus Airways				LOUTUS	2000		
Liwa Air		T7	KPA		2006	2008	
Maximus Air Cargo			MXU	CARGO MAX	2006	2011	Renamed/merged to Maximus Air
Midex Airlines		MG	MIX	MIDEXCARGO	1990	2015	
Nakheel Aviation			NKL		2006	2007	Rebranded as Istithmar World Aviation
Natalco Air Lines				NATALCO			
Phoenix Aviation		P3	PHG	PHOENIX GROUP	1998	2005	Rebranded as AVE.com
RAK Airways		RT	RKM	RAKAIR	2006	2014	
Red Star Aviation			STR		2005	2009	
RUS Aviation					1999	2015	
Silver Air			SVJ		2004	2009	
SkyLink Arabia		KH					
Starjet			MBM		2005	2006	
Wizz Air Abu Dhabi		5W	WAZ	WIZZ SKY	2019	2025	

== See also ==
- List of airlines of the United Arab Emirates
- List of airports in the United Arab Emirates
