= List of airlines of the United Arab Emirates =

This is a list of airlines which have an Air Operator Certificate issued by the General Civil Aviation Authority of the United Arab Emirates.

== Scheduled airlines ==
Airline	Image	IATA	ICAO	Callsign	Commenced operations	Hub airport(s)	Notes
Air Arabia		G9	ABY	ARABIA	2003	Sharjah International Airport, Ras Al Khaimah International Airport	Largest low-cost airline in the Middle East.
Air Arabia Abu Dhabi		3L	ABY	NAWRAS	2020	Zayed International Airport	Low-cost carrier of Abu Dhabi and a subsidiary of Air Arabia.
Emirates		EK	UAE	EMIRATES	1985	Dubai International Airport	Largest airline in the Middle East.
Etihad Airways		EY	ETD	ETIHAD	2003	Zayed International Airport	Second largest airline in the United Arab Emirates.
Flydubai		FZ	FDB	SKY DUBAI	2008	Dubai International Airport	Low-cost carrier of Dubai.

== Charter airlines ==
Airline	Active	Image	IATA	ICAO	Callsign	Commenced operations	Hub airport(s)	Notes
Abu Dhabi Aviation	Yes					1975	Zayed International Airport	ada.ae
AeroGulf Services	Yes					1976	Al Maktoum International Airport	www.aerogulfservices.com
Aerovista	No					1999	Sharjah International Airport	
Empire Aviation Group	Yes			MJE	EMJET		Dubai International Airport	www.empireaviation.com
Falcon Aviation Services	Yes			FVS	FALCON AVIATION	2006	Al Bateen Executive Airport	www.falconaviation.ae
Gama Aviation	Yes			GSH	GAMAMENA	2010	Dubai International Airport	
GI Aviation	No					2016	Al Bateen Executive Airport	www.gi-aviation.com
Gulf Wings	Yes			GWC	GULF WINGS		Sharjah International Airport	www.gulfwings-fze.com
Heli Dubai	Yes						Dubai International Airport	www.helidubai.com
Sea Wing/ Jet Ops	No					2007		Seawings.ae
Rotana Jet	Yes		RG	RJD	ROTANA	2010	Zayed International Airport	rotanajet.com
Royal Jet	No			ROJ	ROYALJET	2003	Zayed International Airport	www.royaljetgroup.com

== Government airlines ==
Airline	Image	IATA	ICAO	Callsign	Commenced operations	Hub airport(s)	Notes
Dubai Royal Air Wing			DUB	DUBAI		Dubai International Airport	Operating for Royal Family of Dubai
Fujairah Royal Flight (PAB AirWing)			FJR			Fujairah International Airport	Operating for Royal Family of Fujairah
Presidential Flight		MO	AUH	EMIRI		Zayed International Airport, Al Bateen Executive Airport	Operating for the Royal Family and Government of Abu Dhabi
Sharjah Ruler's Flight			SHJ	SHARJAH		Sharjah International Airport	Operating for Royal Family of Sharjah

== Cargo airlines ==
Airline	Image	IATA	ICAO	Callsign	Commenced operations	Hub airport(s)	Notes
Emirates SkyCargo		EK	UAE	EMIRATES	1985	Al Maktoum International Airport	
Etihad Cargo		EY	ETD	ETIHAD	2003	Zayed International Airport	
Maximus Air Cargo			MXU	CARGO MAX	2005	Zayed International Airport	
Unique Air			UQA	UNICARGO	2014	Sharjah International Airport	

== See also ==
- List of airlines
- List of defunct airlines of United Arab Emirates
- List of defunct airlines of Asia
