= UQA =

Uqa is the tuber of Oxalis tuberosa, used as a root vegetable.

UQA may also refer to:

- Unique Air, a cargo airline of the United Arab Emirates (ICAO code: UQA)
- Uniqa Insurance Group an insurance groups focusing on Austria and Central and Eastern Europe (stock ticker symbol: UQA)
