= Starjet =

Starjet may refer to:

- Lockheed L-133 Starjet, plane
- Starjet, List of defunct airlines of the United Arab Emirates
- The Starjets, late 1970s power pop/group from Belfast, Northern Ireland
- Fully Integrated Robotised Engine, unit frequently referred to as the "Starjet" engine
