= Set Jet =

Private jet charter program (2014–2024)

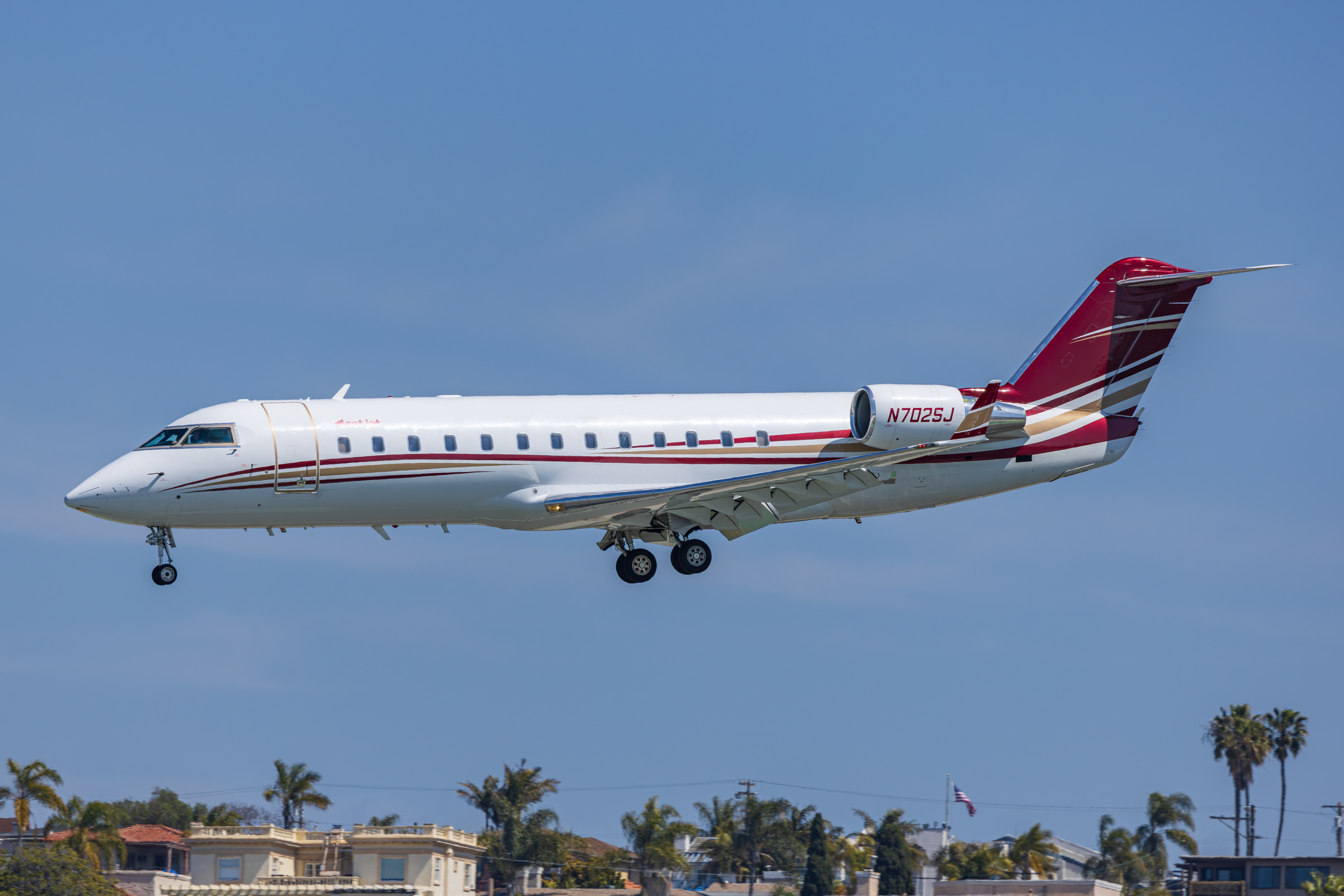
- Founded: 2014
- Ceased operations: 2024
- Fleet size: 5
- Headquarters: Scottsdale, Arizona, United States
- Key people: Trey Smith (CEO); Tom Smith (COO)
- Website: setjet.com

Set Jet was a membership-based by-the-seat private jet charter program.

== Overview ==
Set Jet was headquartered in Scottsdale, Arizona, and was founded in 2014 by Tom Smith and Trey Smith.

Tom was the CEO and Director of Set Jet. Previously, Tom was CEO, President, and Director of Wrap Technologies, Inc. In 1993, Tom co-founded TASER International (now Axon Enterprise, Inc, NASDAQ: AXON), and served as President of TASER until October 2006.

Set Jet operated private jet charter flights on Bombardier Challenger 850 aircraft between Las Vegas, Nevada; Scottsdale, Arizona; Los Angeles; San Diego; San Francisco; and Orange County, California; Cabo San Lucas, Mexico; Salt Lake City, Utah, and had 5,000 members. It used a fleet of 5 Bombardier CRJ100/200 which were configured as Bombardier Challenger 850's.

Set Jet had a 2,500-square-foot terminal in the Atlantic Aviation facility in Las Vegas. Set Jet expanded operations in Las Vegas to shuttle passengers to facilitate the gaming companies.

Set Jet closed in February 2024 after failing to complete its SPAC deal with Revelstone Capital Acquisition Corp. (NASDAQ: RCAC). It had made significant losses for several years and needed funding from the SPAC listing to continue its operations.

== See also ==
- Private jet
- Fractional ownership of aircraft
- Air charter
- Air taxi
- Business jet
