= 17th Air Squadron =

17th Air Squadron/VIP Halim Perdanakusuma Air Force Base
- Skadron Udara 17
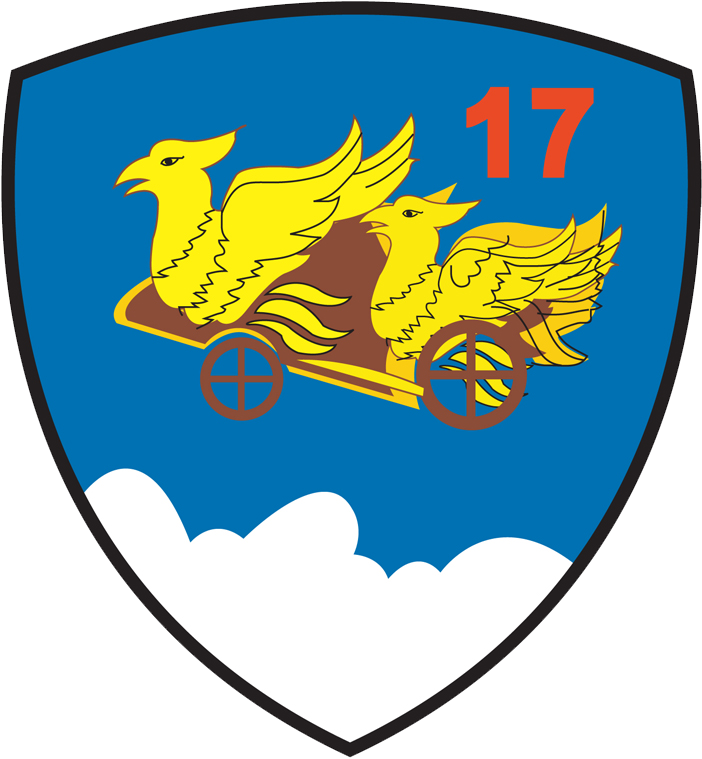
- 17th Air Squadron Badge
- Active: 1 August 1963
- Country: Indonesia
- Branch: Indonesian Air Force
- Type: Special Air Transport Squadron VIP/VVIP
- Role: Transport
- Part of: 1st Air Wing
- Garrison/HQ: Halim Perdanakusuma Air Force Base
- Nickname: "Kereta Kencana" (Golden Chariot)
- Mottos: Valiant, Integrity, Professional
- Website: tni-au.mil.id/portfolio/skadron-17

Aircraft flown
- Transport: Boeing 737; Dassault Falcon 8X

17th Air Squadron (Indonesian: Skadron Udara 17 or Skadud 17) is a Special/VIP transport squadron under the command of the 1st Air Wing at Halim Perdanakusuma Air Base, Jakarta. The 17th Air Squadron operates Indonesian Presidential Aircraft Boeing 737-800 BBJ2 and other transport aircraft.

The 17th Air Squadron was formed by the Air Force Chief of Staff on 1 August 1963. The squadron is based at Halim Perdanakusuma Air Force Base.

== History ==
The 17th Air Squadron was formerly known as IV Air Squadron. In 1963, the name was changed to 17th Air Squadron. The number 17 is taken from the date of the proclamation of independence of the Republic of Indonesia on 17 August 1945.

17th Air Squadron once flew the Secretary General of the United Nations, Ban Ki-moon, using a Boeing 737 aircraft. The trip across the continent departed from their headquarters at Halim Perdanakusuma Air Force Base and was overseen by Lt. Col. Bambang Gunarto, the Squadron Commander at the time.

The duties of this squadron are similar to the "Presidential Airlift Group 89th Airlift Wing of the United States Air Force", better known as "Air Force One", as the 17th Air Squadron operates Indonesian Presidential Aircraft, the Boeing 737 BBJ and other VIP/VVIP aircraft.

== Operations ==
The maintenance of the 17th Air Squadron is under the handling of the Ministry of the State Secretariat and even the operation of the aircraft is under the coordination of the Indonesian President's Military Secretariat.

Besides providing transportation for the president and other VIP passengers, the squadron also operated ex-Garuda Indonesia 737-400, used in evacuation of Indonesian nationals in conflict zone such as Afghanistan and Sudan.

This squadron once operated twentyone Il-14 Avia, three C-140 JetStar, C-47, one 737-200 (moved to another squadron), seven L401/402 Cessna, Fokker F27 Friendship, Fokker F28 Fellowship, Boeing B707.

As of now, the squadron operated one Dassault Falcon 7x and one Falcon 8x, Boeing Business Jet 737, Boeing 737 (500, 400, 800, 800NG), C-130 Hercules. The squadron once operated AS-332 Super Puma, but since 2011, since the formation of the 45th Air Squadron, with the main task of flying VIP rotary wing aircraft, these helicopters were moved to the 45th Air Squadron.

== Sources ==
- Hakim, Chappy (April 2010). Pelangi Dirgantara. Jakarta: Penerbit Buku Kompas. ISBN 978-979-709-480-5.
