= Midex =

Midex or MIDEX may refer to:

== Midex ==
- Midex Airlines, a cargo airline based in the United Arab Emirates
- the callsign of the former United States airline Midwest Airlines

== MIDEX ==
- an index used by the Borsa Italiana, Italy's principal stock exchange
- Medium Explorer program, a NASA spacecraft classification used in its Explorers program
- a series of MIDI interfaces made by the music software and equipment manufacturer Steinberg
