= Embraer Lineage 1000 =

Business jet

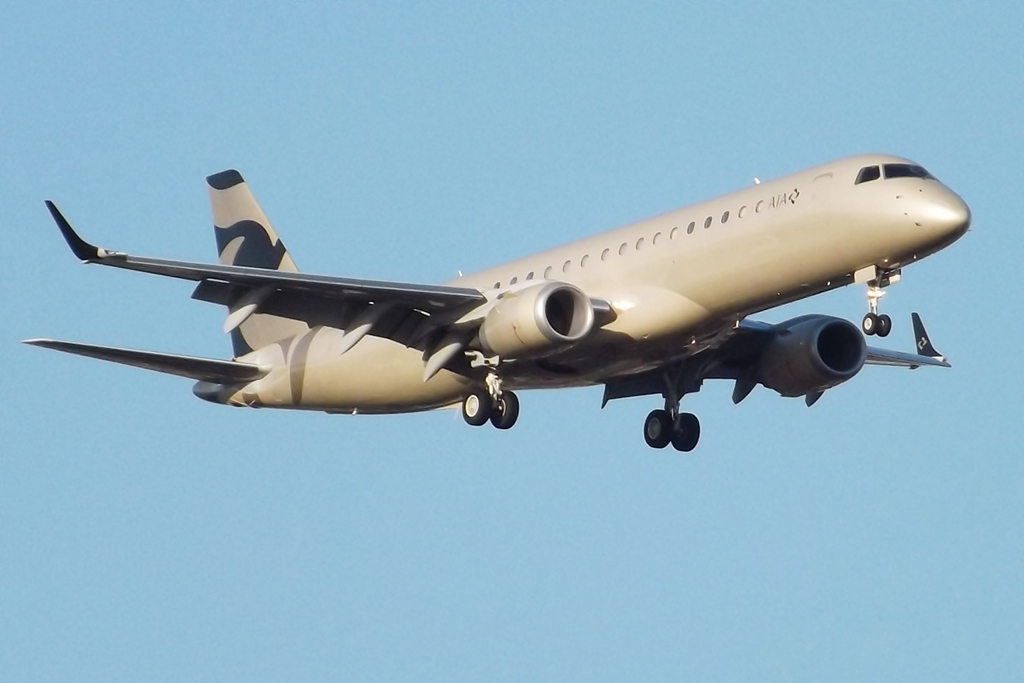
- Lineage 1000 inflight, gear down

General information
- Type: Business jet
- National origin: Brazil
- Manufacturer: Embraer
- Status: In service
- Primary user: AirX Charter
- Number built: 28

History
- Manufactured: 2007–August 2020
- Introduction date: May 7, 2009
- First flight: October 26, 2007

The Embraer Lineage 1000 is a variant of the Embraer E190 regional jet airliner, launched as a private jet on May 2, 2006. Manufactured by the Brazilian aerospace firm Embraer until 2017, the Lineage was advertised as an "ultra-large" business jet with seating for up to 19 passengers.

== Design ==
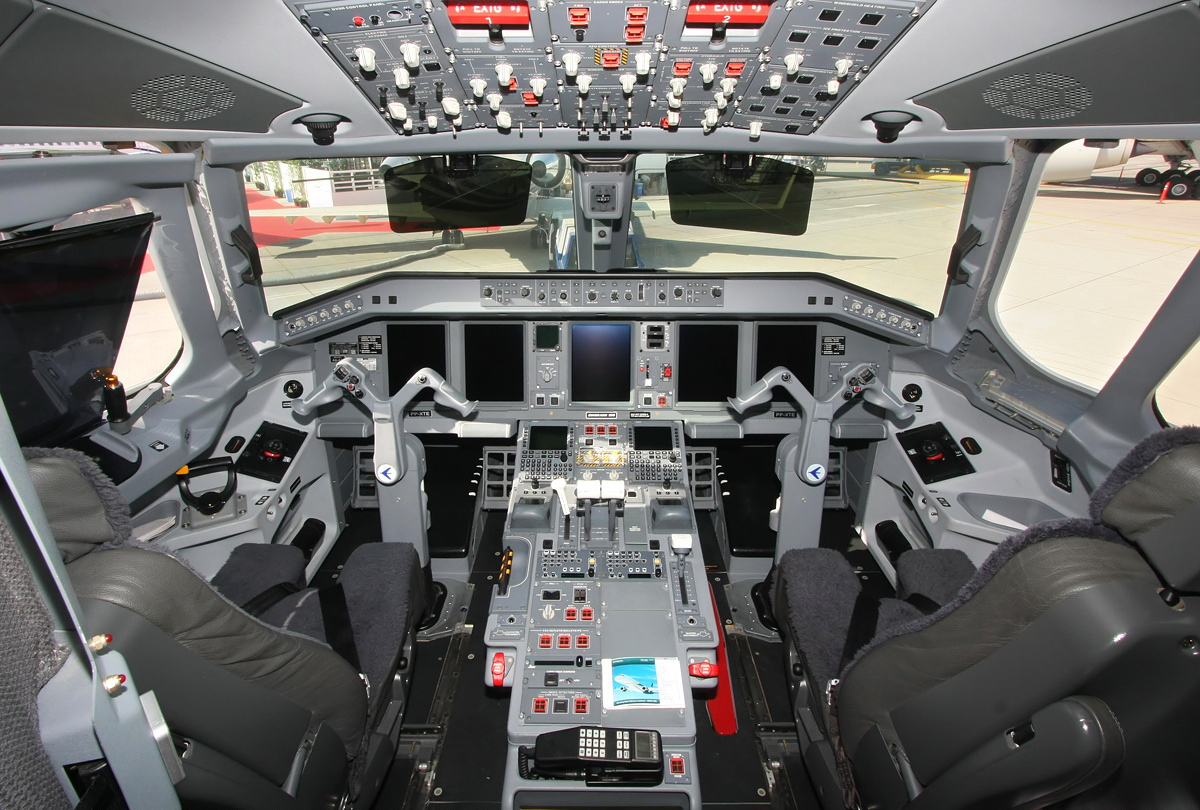
Flight deck.

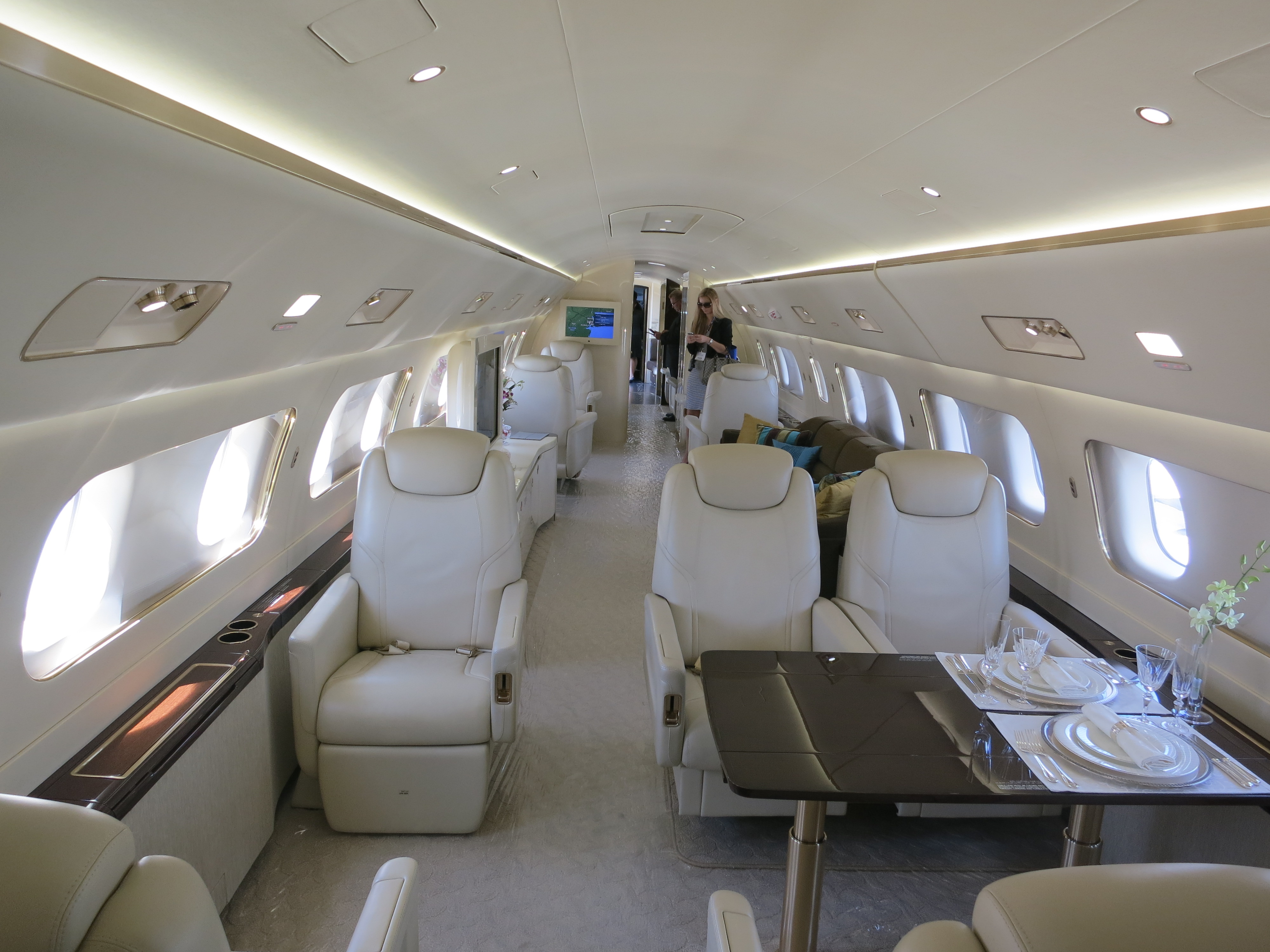
Cabin.

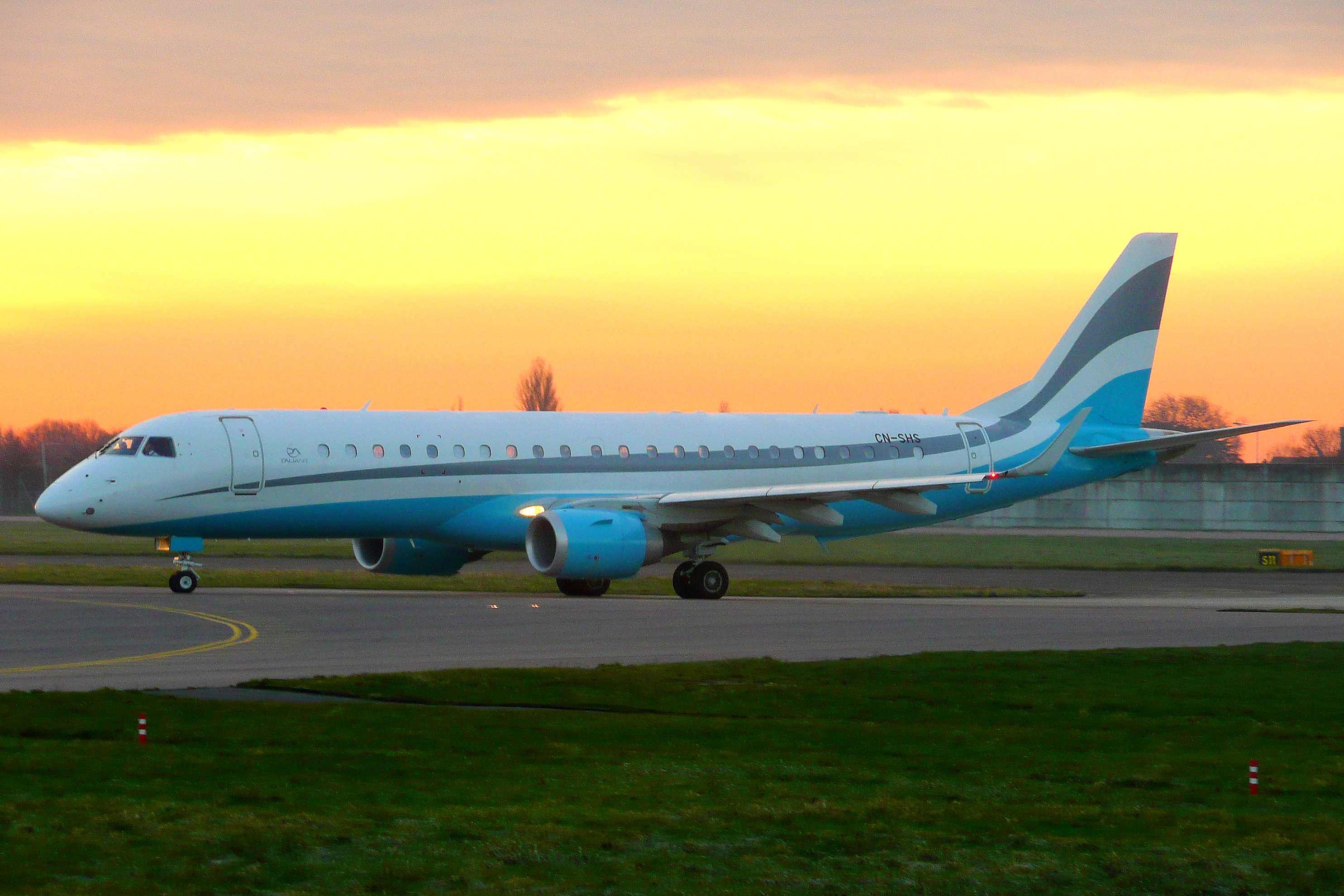
On ramp, at sunrise.

The Lineage 1000 is based on the Embraer 190 airliner, with added fuel tanks in the lower deck cargo hold space, nearly doubling the jet's range. It boasts a lavish interior, divided into up to five sections, including an optional bedroom, a washroom with running water, and a walk-in cargo area at the rear. Its fuselage cross-section is larger than similarly priced business jets, such as the $50.4M Global 5000, the $53.8M Falcon 7X, and the $54.5M Gulfstream G600, although smaller than other airliner conversions, such as the Boeing 737-700 based BBJ1 that costs $71.4M and the Airbus A319 based ACJ319 that costs $87.0M.

== Development ==
The Lineage 1000 received its certification from Brazil's ANAC and from EASA in December 2008. It was certified by the USA Federal Aviation Administration on 7 January 2009. The first Lineage 1000 was delivered on May 7, 2009.

In October 2013, Embraer introduced the Lineage 1000E, which delivers a greater range of 4,600 nautical miles [nmi] (8,519 km; 5,294 mi). In addition, the new Lineage 1000E features new in-flight entertainment and cockpit options. In 2019, its unit cost was US$ 49.9 million. In August 2020 Embraer announced it was stopping sales of the Lineage 1000.

On 6 October 2020, the Pakistan Navy announced the selection of the Lineage 1000 to replace its P-3C Orion in the maritime patrol role, with ten converted commercial jets.

== Variants ==
- Lineage 1000: Standard civil version.
- Sea Sultan: Long range maritime patrol version for the Pakistan Navy.

== Operators ==
=== Civil operators ===
- Al Jaber Aviation
- AirX Charter
- Falcon Aviation Services
- Royal Jet
- Air Hamburg
- Conviasa
- Flex Flight International

=== Military and government operators ===
- Brazil
  - Brazilian Air Force - Two units used as secondary presidential aircraft.
- Pakistan
  - Pakistan Navy - Ten "Sea Sultan" units ordered and two delivered in 2020 to replace their old P-3 Orion aircraft.

== Aircraft deliveries ==
| Year | 2009 | 2010 | 2011 | 2012 | 2013 | 2014 | 2015 | 2016 | 2017 | Total |
|---|---|---|---|---|---|---|---|---|---|---|
| Number of deliveries | 5 | 5 | 3 | 2 | 4 | 3 | 3 | 2 | 1 | 28 |

== Specifications (Lineage 1000/1000E) ==
Data from Aviation Week

General characteristics

- Crew: 2 pilots
- Capacity: 13 passengers (typical configuration); 19 passengers maximum
- Length: 36.24 m (118 ft 11 in)
- Wingspan: 28.72 m (94 ft 3 in)
- Height: 10.57 m (34 ft 8 in)
- Wing area: 92.5 m^{2} (996 sq ft)
- Aspect ratio: 8.9
- Empty weight: 32,133 kg (70,841 lb)
- Max takeoff weight: 54,500 kg (120,152 lb)
- Fuel capacity: 21,871 kg (48,217 lb)
- Max landing weight : 45,800 kg (100,972 lb)
- Max zero fuel weight : 36,500 kg (80,469 lb)
- Powerplant: 2 × General Electric CF34-10E(1000), CF-34-10E7-B(1000E) turbofan engines, 82 kN (18,500 lbf) thrust each

Performance

- Maximum speed: Mach 0.82
- Cruise speed: 874 km/h (543 mph, 472 kn)
- Range: 8,300 km (5,200 mi, 4,500 nmi) 8 pax (M 0.78, NBAA IFR res.)
- Service ceiling: 12,000 m (41,000 ft)
- Thrust/weight: 0.31
- Take-off: (MTOW, SL, ISA) 6,076 ft / 1,852 m
- Landing: (MLW, SL, ISA) 2,450 ft / 747 m
- Climb to FL370: 29 min

Avionics
Honeywell Primus Epic

== See also ==
Related development

- Embraer 190

Aircraft of comparable role, configuration, and era

- Boeing BBJ
- Airbus Corporate Jets
- Airbus A318 Elite
- Bombardier Global Express

Related lists

- List of civil aircraft
