= AirX Charter =

Maltese charter airline

IATA	ICAO	Call sign
AX	AXY	LEGEND
- Founded: 2011
- AOC #: MT-23
- Operating bases: Malta International Airport
- Fleet size: 20
- Headquarters: Smart City, Malta
- Key people: John B. Matthews (Chairman); Houssam Hazzoury (CEO)
- Employees: 485
- Website: airx.aero

AirX Charter is a private charter airline based in Malta.

== Operations ==
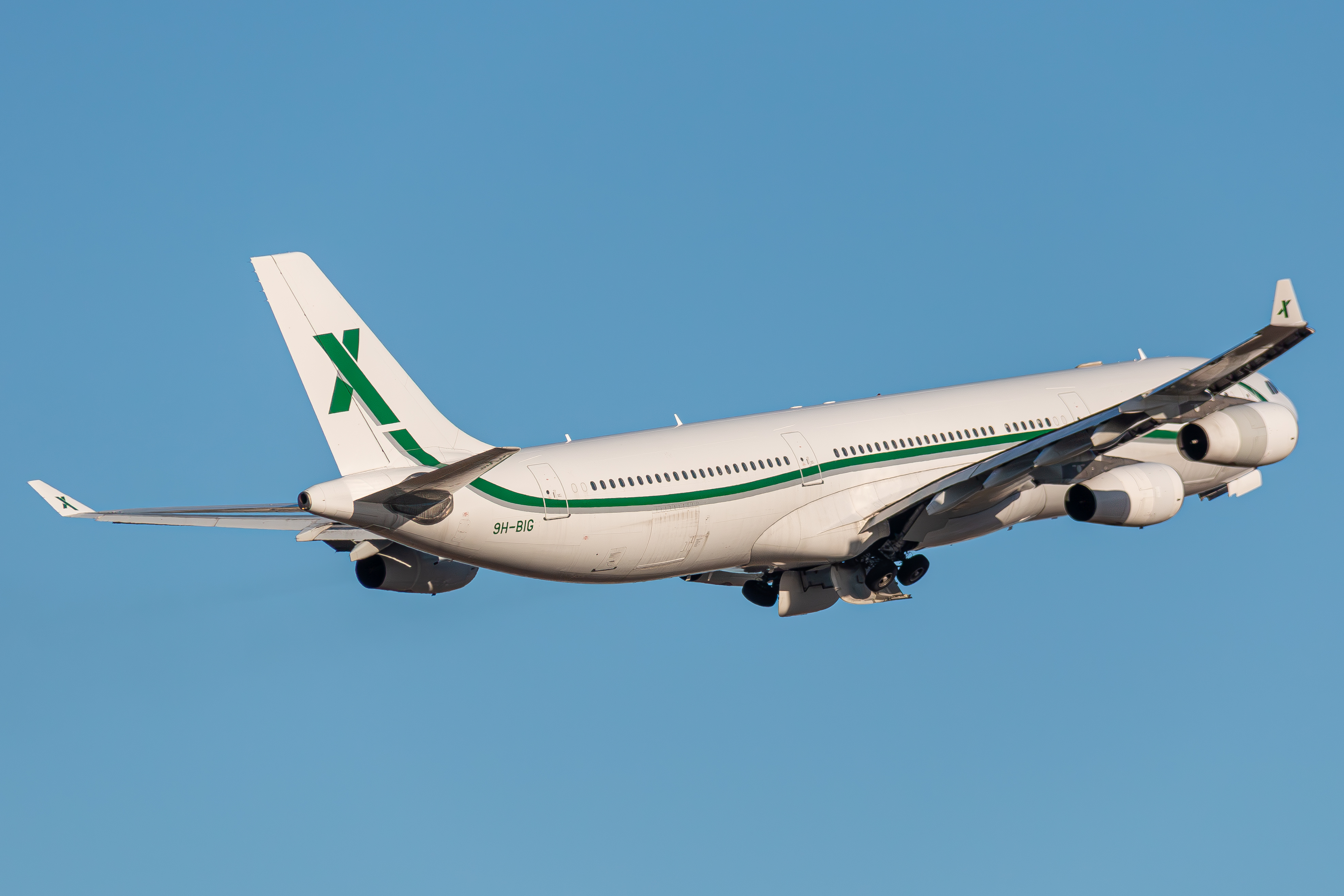
AirX Airbus A340-300

AirX Charter holds a European air operator's certificate (AOC) in Malta and operates a fleet of 20 aircraft. The Head Office is located in Malta, with other offices in London, U.K. AirX Jet Support is based in Stansted Airport and Malta and has two EASA Part-145 Certificate of Maintenance issued by EASA and maintains both the AirX fleet and third party aircraft.

== History ==
In 2019, AirX announced plans to become the world's largest operator of the Embraer Lineage 1000 following the addition of further aircraft to its fleet.

In 2022, AirX participated in humanitarian relief efforts supporting Ukrainian refugees by operating flights delivering aid and transporting displaced people from Eastern Europe.

In 2025, AirX unveiled a new aircraft livery on its Bombardier Challenger 850 fleet, marking the beginning of a fleet-wide livery rollout.

In 2025, AirX completed a €115 million corporate bond issuance arranged by Arctic Securities to support fleet expansion. The bond was reportedly oversubscribed and backed by some of the company’s aircraft.

In 2026, AirX received approval from Saudi Arabia's General Authority of Civil Aviation (GACA) under the Part 129 regulatory framework, allowing the company to expand its private jet charter operations within the Kingdom.

In 2026, AirX reported increased demand for private jet charter flights during heightened geopolitical tensions in the Middle East, as clients sought to leave the region. Founder John Matthews stated that demand had increased as commercial airline schedules became limited or unreliable.

== Fleet ==
As of June 2025, AirX operated the following aircraft:

- 1 Airbus A340-300 (as of July 2026)
- 1 BBJ
- 1 Bombardier Challenger 604
- 8 Bombardier Challenger 850
- 4 Embraer Legacy 600
- 5 Embraer Lineage 1000
