= Jupiter Airlines =

Emirati airline

Jupiter Airlines was a defunct airline based in Sharjah, United Arab Emirates, that operated from 1996 to 2010. The airline provided both passenger and cargo services, focusing on charter operations within the Middle East and Africa.

== History ==
Jupiter Airlines was established in 1996 as a General Sales Agent (GSA) and cargo broker in Sharjah. Over time, it expanded its operations to include passenger services. In 2003, the airline was restructured under Jupiter Holdings, which also oversees Jupiter Cargo Services and other logistics ventures. The airline operated from Dubai International Airport using a fleet of Boeing 737 aircraft.

== See also ==
List of defunct airlines of the United Arab Emirates
