= Indonesian presidential aircraft =

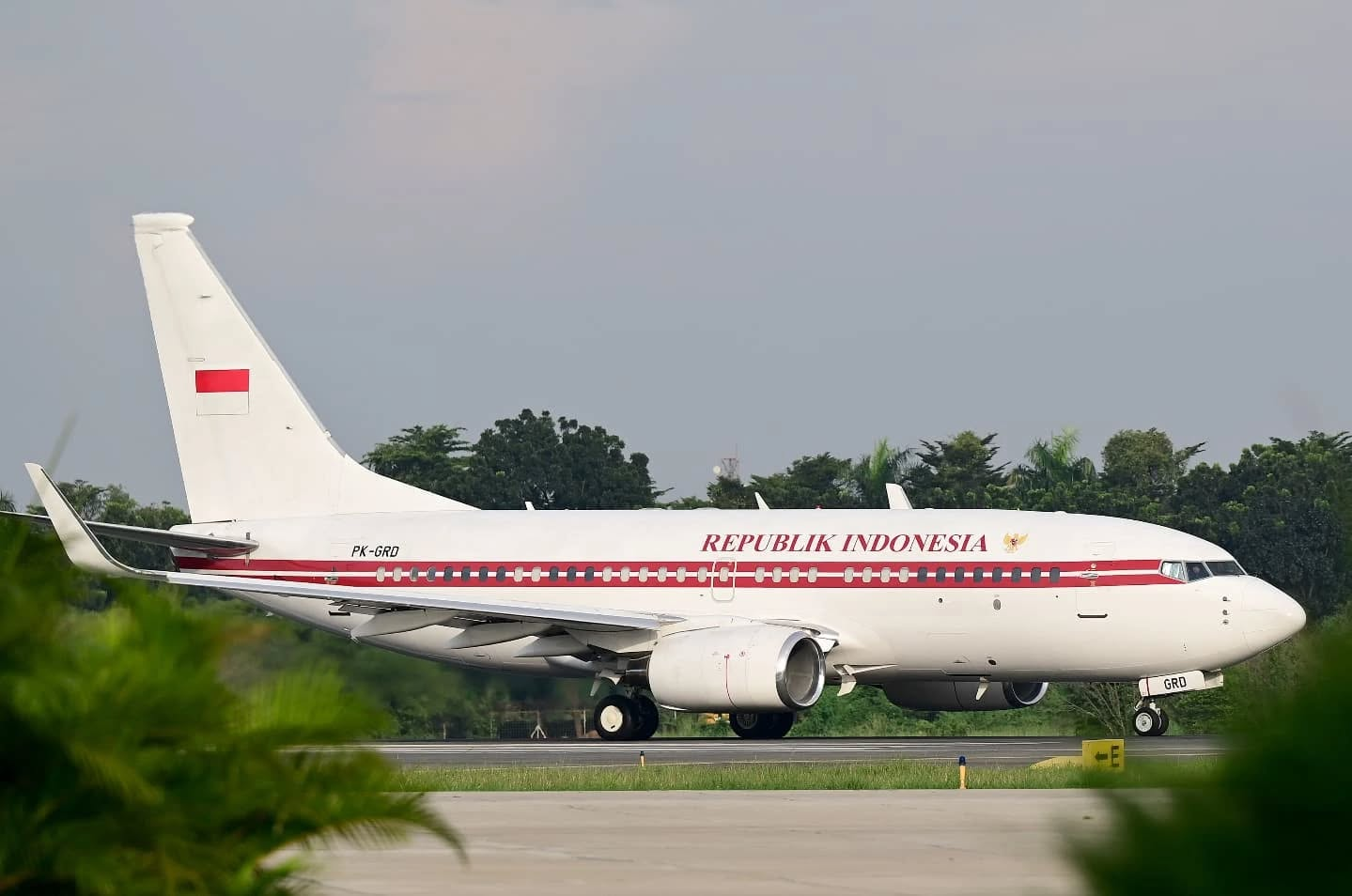
- Boeing 737-700 Business Jet PK-GRD, May 2025

General information
- Type: Boeing 737-73Q(WL) BBJ1
- Manufacturer: Boeing
- Status: Operational
- Owners: Privately owned by Prabowo Subianto
- Construction number: 30789
- Registration: PK-GRD

History
- In service: 2024–present

The Indonesian presidential aircraft (Indonesian: Pesawat Kepresidenan Indonesia), is the presidential aircraft carrying the president of Indonesia.

Since 2024, the aircraft used as the main presidential aircraft is a Boeing 737-700/BBJ1, privately owned by President Prabowo Subianto. The aircraft with registration number PK-GRD is operated with the call sign "INDONESIA ONE".

Previously the main presidential aircraft was a Boeing 737-800/BBJ2. The call sign of this aircraft is "Indonesia One", "Indonesian Air Force 01" or "IDAF01" with registration number "A-001". The aircraft belongs to the Ministry of State Secretariat, operated by the Indonesian Air Force's 17th Air Squadron, and maintained by GMF AeroAsia.

In November 2026, President Prabowo Subianto used an executive Airbus A320-232 as the presidential aircraft for his visit to Manila, Philippines to attend the 2026 ASEAN Summits. The aircraft is registered in San Marino as "T7-ESJ" and operated by the Hong Kong-based charter airline Aegle Aviation.

Beginning in 2020, the Indonesian government chartered a Boeing 777-300ER aircraft, registration PK-GIG, from Garuda Indonesia for the president's use on long-haul flights. When used to transport the president, the call sign of the 777 is "GIA1" or "Indonesia 1".

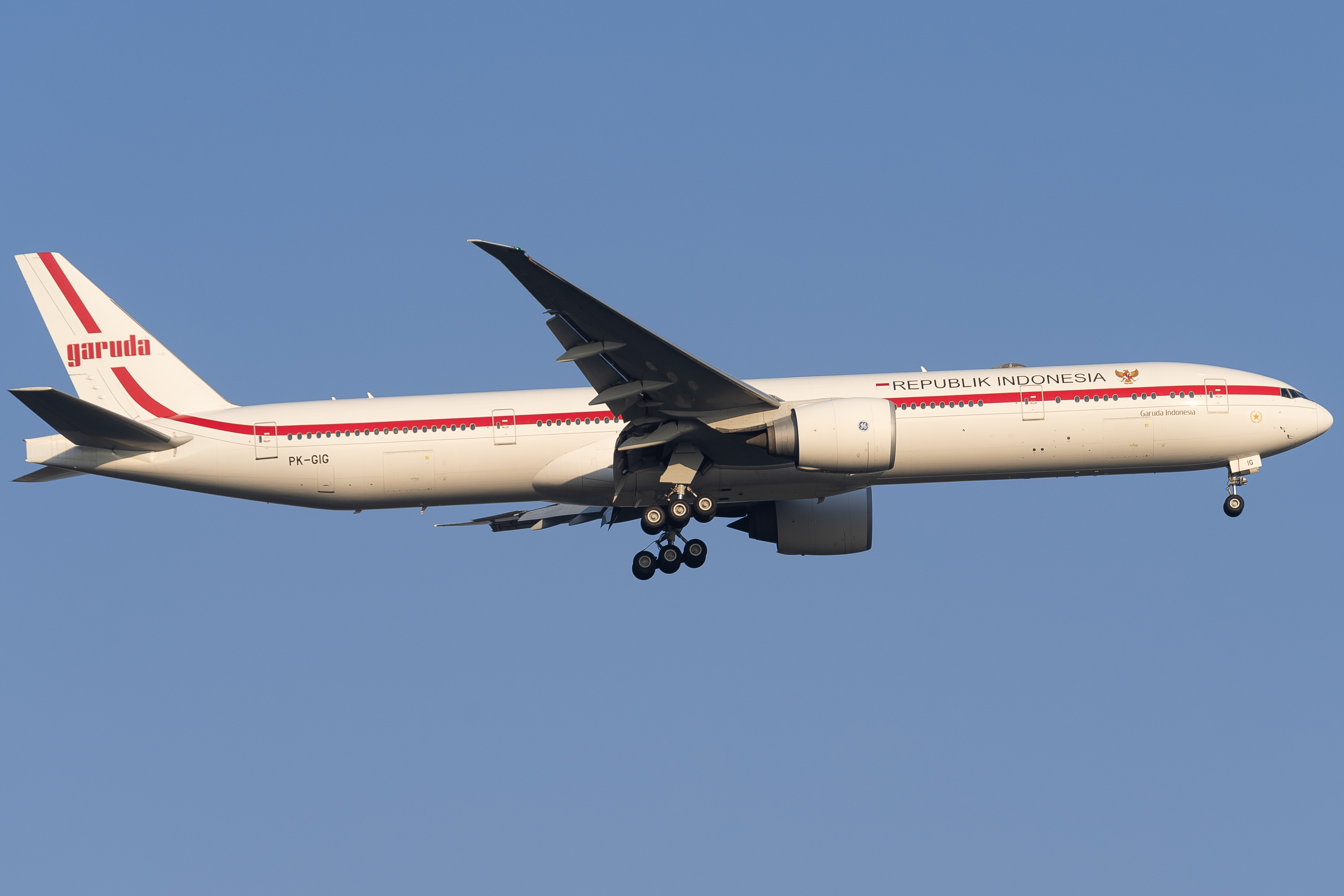
The current Garuda Indonesia aircraft that is often chartered for long-haul official presidential trips. The aircraft is a Boeing 777-300ER registered PK-GIG and painted red and white with "Republic of Indonesia" and Indonesian flag alongside the national emblem attached in its livery.

In September 2025, another Boeing 777-300ER from Garuda Indonesia bearing PK-GIF registration was repainted into "Republik Indonesia" / Presidential livery just like PK-GIG. Those two aircraft also have same cabin configuration.

== History ==
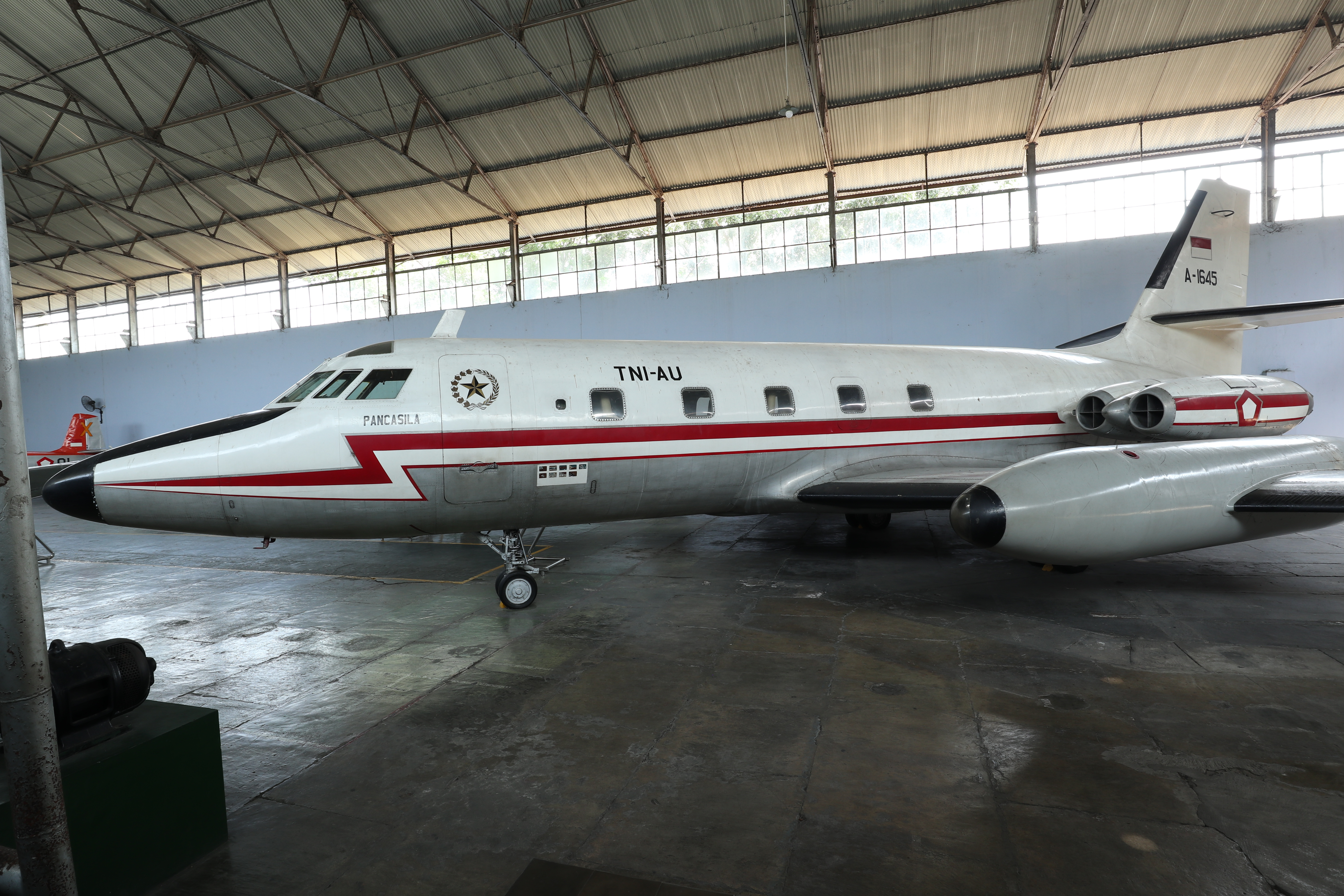
Lockheed C-140 Jetstar "Pancasila" used by President Sukarno the 1960s

In the 1960s, Indonesia's first presidential aircraft was an Ilyushin Il-14, acquired from the Soviet government, and was used by Indonesia's first president, Sukarno. This aircraft was named "Dolok Martimbang", and was allocated to 17th Squadron of the Indonesian Air Force. This aircraft, however, was not modified specifically for its role as a presidential aircraft.

Shortly after Sukarno visited the United States in 1961, the IL-14 was replaced by three Lockheed C-140 Jetstar aircraft, as a gift from John F. Kennedy. These aircraft were named "Pancasila", "Sapta Marga" and "Irian".

In the New Order era, the Indonesian presidential aircraft was originally planned to be a Boeing 727-200 but this was later cancelled and a Boeing 707-320C, originally intended to be used by Pelita Air, was used instead. This aircraft used the civilian registration PK-PJQ from 1975 to 1986 until it was transferred to the Indonesian Air Force as A-7002, and retired from service around 2003. This Boeing 707 was also leased to Sempati Air for chartered flights to Japan and to Garuda Indonesia for hajj flights in the 1980s. However, Suharto frequently used a Garuda Indonesia DC-10 for overseas state visits and a Pelita Air Avro RJ85 for local state visits.

The president of Indonesia and the vice president formerly used aircraft chartered from Garuda Indonesia for air travel. Boeing 737-800s were used for domestic flights and short-range international flights while Airbus A330-300s were used for most overseas trips and state visits. The Indonesian Air Force also has special VIP squadrons for the president, vice president and government ministers. One of them is the 17th Squadron (Indonesian: Skadron Udara 17) operating Avro RJ85s, Boeing 737-200s, Boeing 737-400s, Fokker F27-400s, Fokker F28-1000s and the Lockheed C-130 Hercules fixed-wing aircraft; while the other squadron is the 45th Squadron (Indonesian: Skadron Udara 45) flying Aérospatiale AS 332L-1 Super Puma helicopters. All these aircraft and helicopters are based at Halim Perdanakusuma AFB, Jakarta. Almost all presidential flights depart from there. Garuda Indonesia and Indonesian Air Force aircraft were used by Indonesian presidents Sukarno, Suharto, B.J. Habibie, Abdurrahman Wahid, Megawati Sukarnoputri and during most of Susilo Bambang Yudhoyono's administration.

The plan to acquire a new presidential aircraft had been contemplated since the Abdurrahman Wahid's administration (1999–2001). On 3 November 2009, the legislature approved a budget of IDR 200 billion as down payment for a VVIP Boeing 737-500 aircraft. The Indonesian State Secretariat included the cost of buying a new airplane into the 2010-2011 state budget.

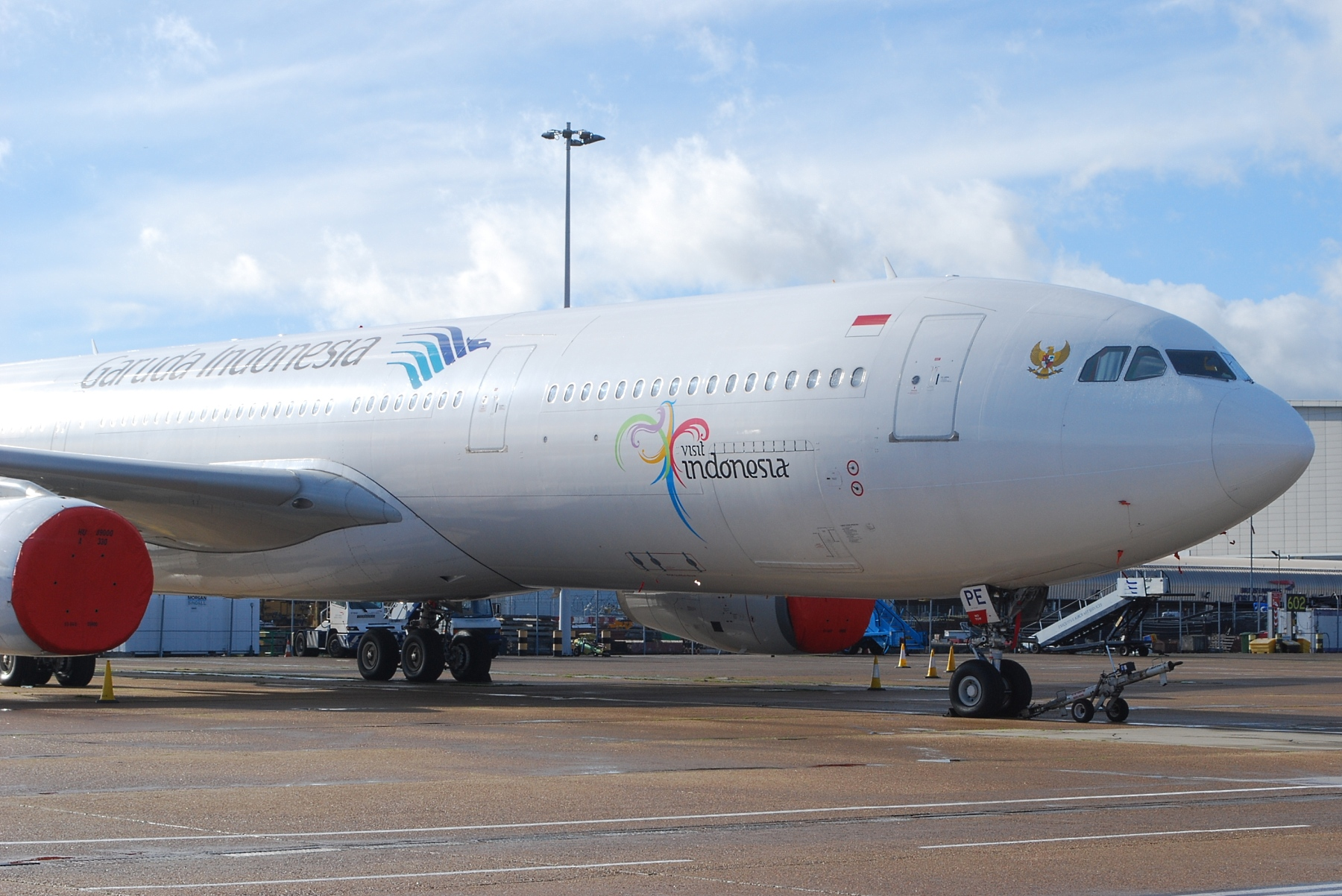
Garuda Indonesia Airbus A330-341 on a state visit at London Heathrow Airport in 2012. Note the national emblem near the cockpit window assigned only on Garuda Indonesia aircraft carrying the president.

In January 2010, the Indonesian government announced a US$200 million budget to acquire a new aircraft for presidential and government use. The government insisted the cost of operating its own aircraft would be lower than chartering aircraft every time the president had to travel. On 27 December 2010, Indonesian government with Boeing signed a purchase agreement for a 737-800 Boeing Business Jet 2 aircraft.

On 20 January 2012, Indonesian Government received a "green " (plain "hollow" aircraft prior to any specific modifications) BBJ2 variant of the 737-800 from the Boeing company, to be further modified and equipped with interior and security features. The price of plain aircraft prior to modification is USD 58 million. After several delays the BBJ2 was delivered on 10 April 2014 and received by the Indonesian Minister of State Secretariat Sudi Silalahi.

President Susilo Bambang Yudhoyono was the first president who flew in "Indonesia One" on state duties, on 5 May 2014 when he flew from Jakarta to Denpasar, Bali, to attend the regional conference of Open Government Partnership (OGP) Asia-Pacific.

President Joko Widodo's first trip in "Indonesia One" was shortly after his inauguration on 29 October 2014. President Joko Widodo flew to Medan, North Sumatra, and went to Karo Regency to address the natural disaster relief efforts and to visit the refugees of the 2014 Mount Sinabung eruption. On this occasion, the president was accompanied by first lady Iriana, Minister of Social Affairs Khofifah Indar Parawansa, and his daughter Kahiyang Ayu.

Since Prabowo Subianto took office in 2024, he has preferred using his privately owned Boeing 737-700/BBJ rather than using the state-owned 737-800/BBJ2.

== Defense system ==
The previous presidential aircraft, a Boeing 737-800BBJ operated by the Air Force, featured an embedded anti missile system. The aircraft has a heat detector and also radar to detect foreign objects, missiles or other airplanes, near, around or approaching the aircraft, plus the ability to avoid the attack. The USD 4.5-million anti-missile defense system deploys chaff, a cloud of thin metal sheets and plastic pieces, and flares as a countermeasure to deter guided missile strikes.

== Livery ==
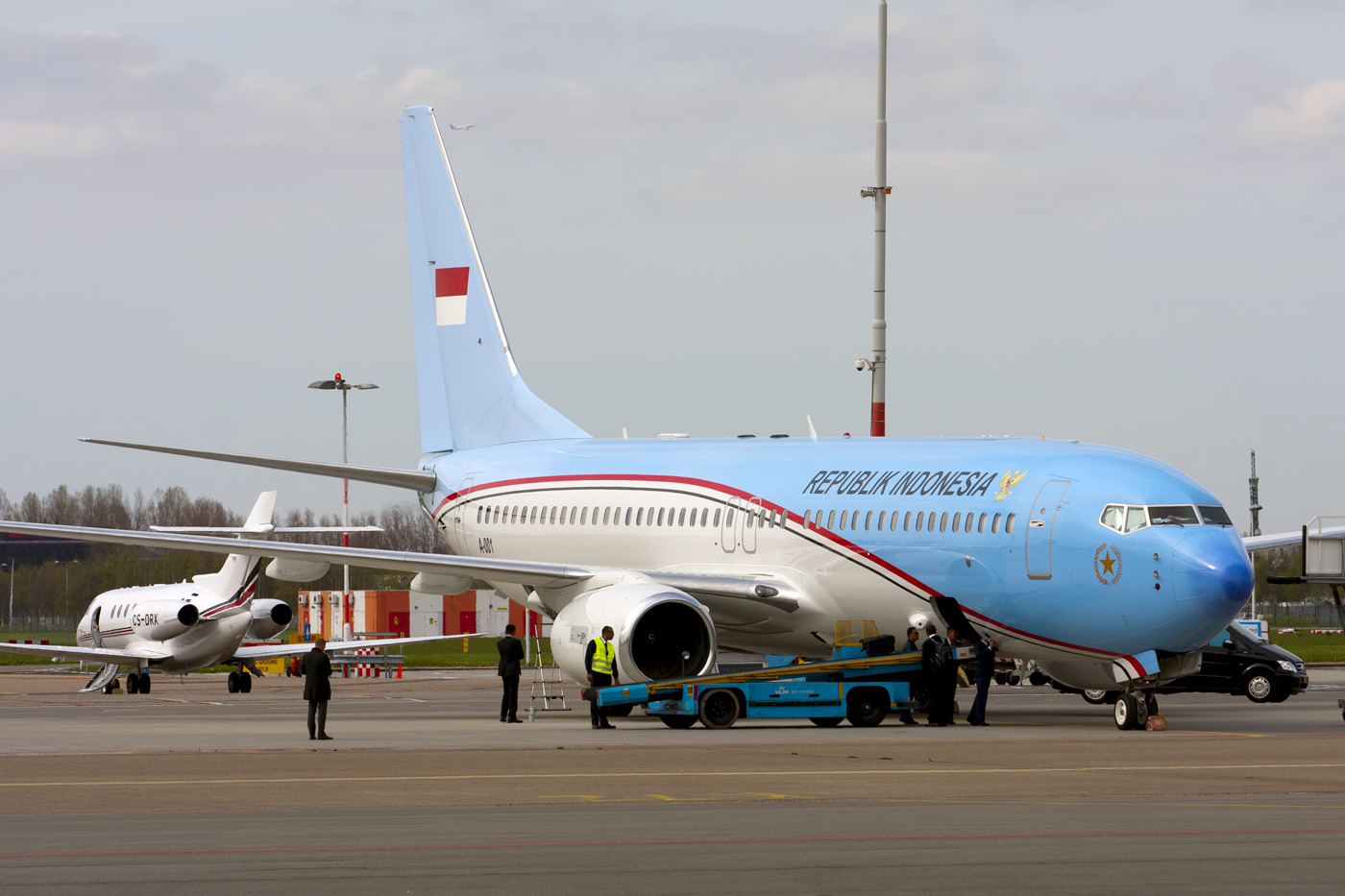
Boeing 737-800 A-001 with previous skyblue-white livery in April 2016

The Indonesian presidential aircraft is painted red on top and white on the bottom, the colors of the national flag. The two color fields is separated by a golden strip, the Indonesian national colors, creating a long curved golden ribbon along the fuselage. On top and along the windows there are the national emblem followed by the text "Republik Indonesia" in white, on each sides. On the front directly below the cockpit windows there is the Indonesian presidential emblems of a gold star on each side. On vertical stabilizer there is a print of Indonesian flag on each sides.

After the aircraft was unveiled, its livery and color scheme was sky blue on top and white on the bottom, and attracted criticism. Some deemed it "unattractive", while others noted the similarity of sky blue color scheme to the United States Air Force One, and others suspected a political connotation. (Note: Yudhoyono's party is the Partai Demokrat which uses blue in its logo.) Minister of State Secretariat Sudi Silalahi, responded that the sky blue color was chosen for safety and security reasons, as a sky-colored camouflage. The color is also widely used as the uniform of the Indonesian Air Force personnel who operate the aircraft. It was also chosen as a unique identity, since there are no Indonesian commercial aircraft using this color in their livery. In early August 2021, the presidential aircraft was repainted red on top and white on the bottom.

The chartered Boeing 777-300ER is painted white with a red cheatline over the length of the fuselage and up the tail, with "Republik Indonesia" written on the front of the fuselage between the national emblem and the flag of Indonesia, with "garuda" written on the tail in red. This livery is similar to Garuda Indonesia's retro livery.

Since 2025 the livery was changed to white with two red stripes, "Republik Indonesia" and the Garuda Pancasila emblem on the side, similar to Garuda Indonesia's PK-GIG retro livery. Aircraft that uses this livery includes one Boeing 737-700/BBJ, one 737-800/BBJ2, two NAS332 Super Puma, one police AW189 and two Airbus H225M.

== Fleet ==
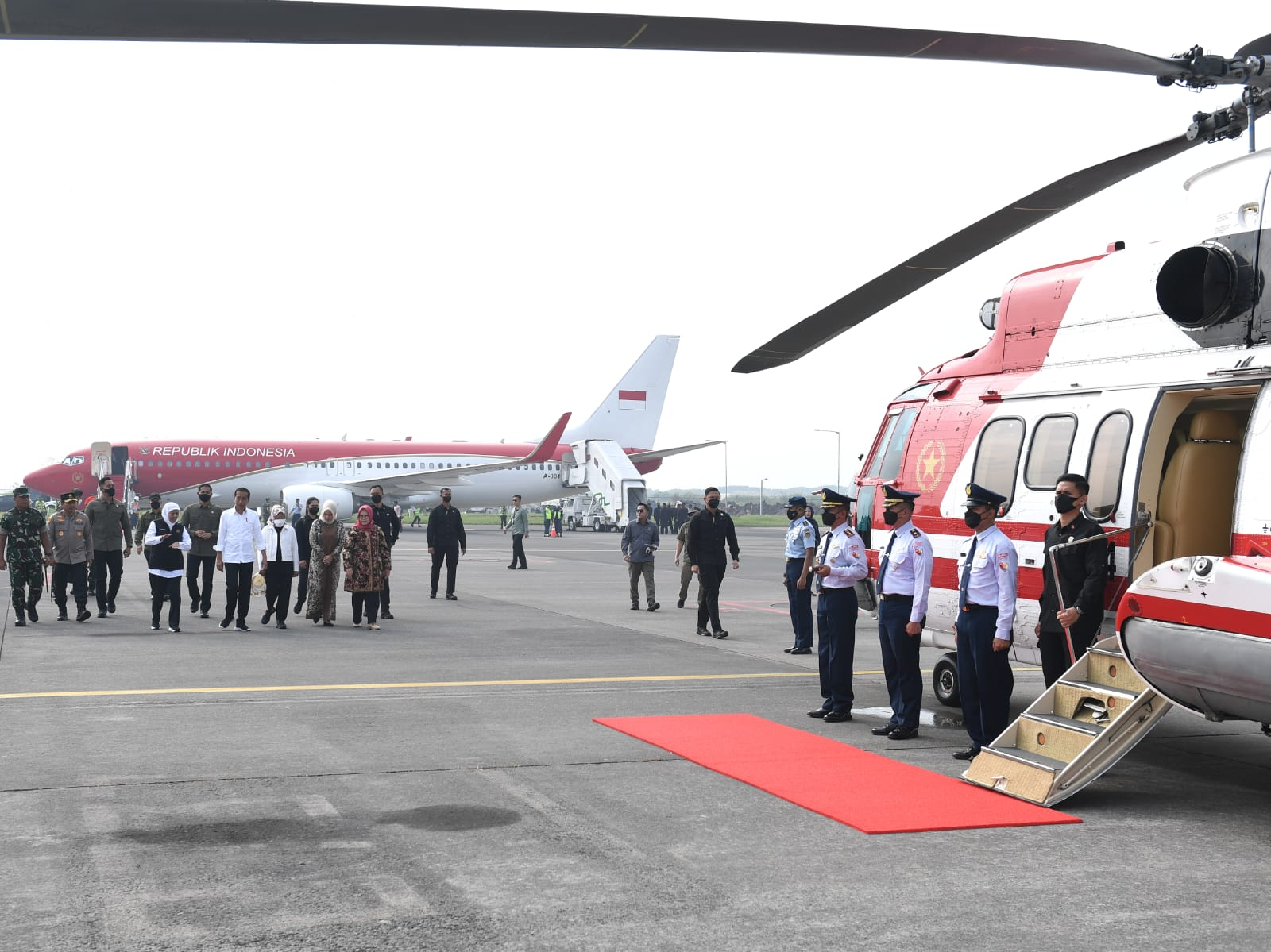
The presidential A-001 and the NAS332 presidential helicopter

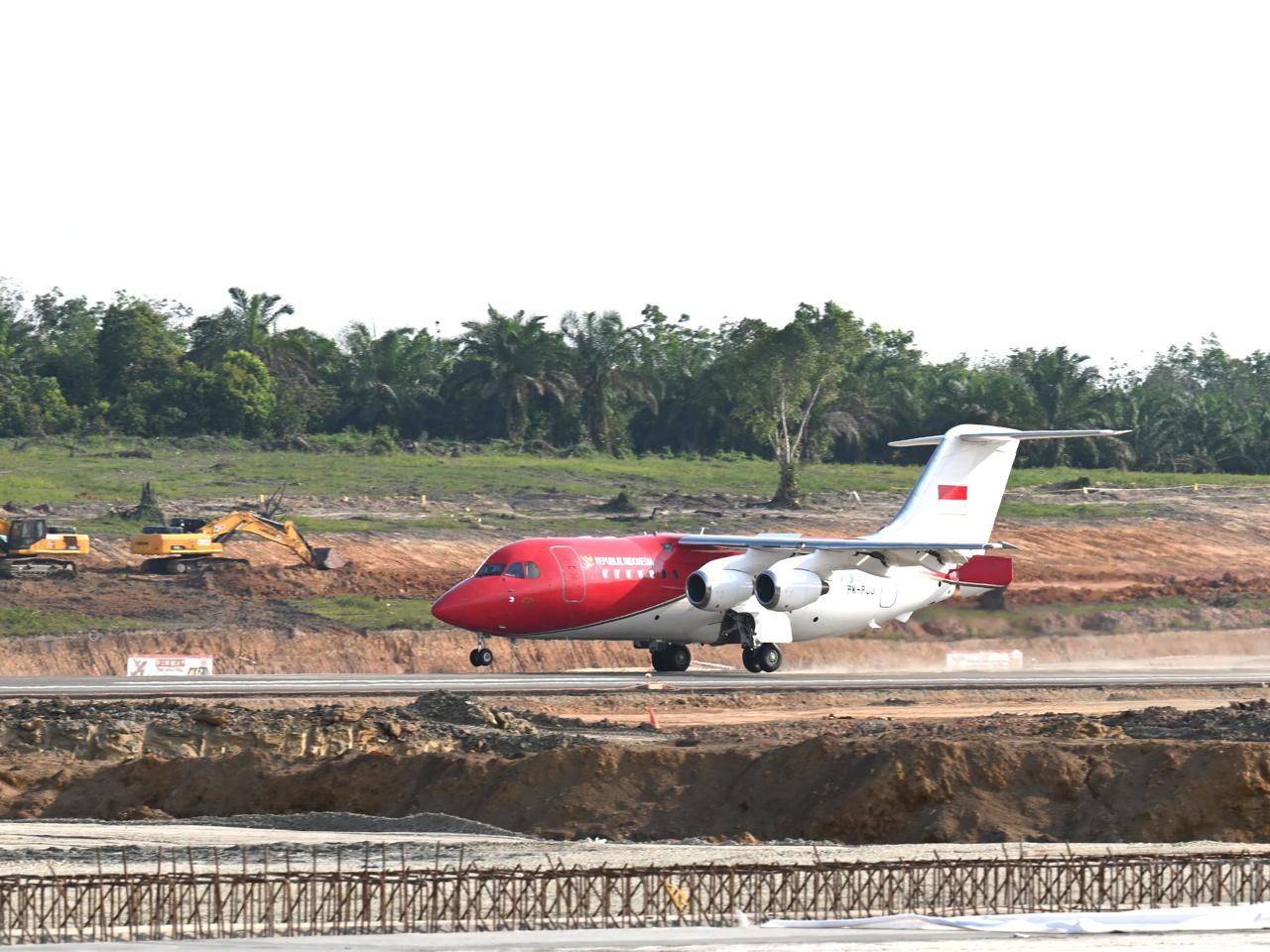
The presidential Avro RJ85 on landing, 2024

The presidential flight fleet consists of the following aircraft (as of 2026):

Presidential flight current fleet
Aircraft	Total	Orders	Notes
Airbus A320-232	1	—	Operated by Aegle Aviation
Airbus A330-941	1	—	Operated by Garuda Indonesia
Airbus A340-542	—	1	
Boeing 737-700/BBJ1	1	—	Chartered from SLL Resources
Boeing 737-800/BBJ2	1	—	Operated by the Air Force
Boeing 777-300ER	2	—	Chartered from Garuda Indonesia
Avro RJ85	1	—	Chartered from Pelita Air
IPTN NAS332 Super Puma	5	—	Operated by the Air Force
AgustaWestland AW189	1		Operated by the Police
Airbus H225M	2		Operated by the Air Force
Total	15	1	

Previously, the presidential fleet used Ilyushin Il-14, Lockheed C-140 Jetstar, and Hiller 360 operated by the Indonesian Air Force. Later the government used aircraft chartered from Garuda Indonesia, such as Convair 990, McDonnell Douglas DC-8, McDonnell Douglas DC-10, McDonnell Douglas MD-11, Boeing 707-320, Boeing 737 Classic, Airbus A300, and A330-300.

Other aircraft occasionally used by the vice president includes Indonesian Air Force's Boeing 737 Classic and 737 Next Generation. While the foreign minister, defence minister and other officials used Indonesian Air Force's Dassault Falcon 8X.

== See also ==
Media related to Presidential aircraft of Indonesia at Wikimedia Commons

- Presidential state car
- Air Force One
