= Kang Pacific Airlines =

UAE airline

IATA	ICAO	Call sign
T7	KPA	-
- Founded: 2006
- Ceased operations: 2008
- Hubs: Fujairah International Airport
- Fleet size: 1
- Destinations: 3
- Headquarters: Fujairah, United Arab Emirates
- Key people: Paul Kang (CEO)
- Website: http://www.flykpa.com/

Kang Pacific Airlines was a low-cost carrier operating out of Fujairah International Airport in the United Arab Emirates. The airline made its first, and only flight on 6 June 2008.

== History ==
Kang Pacific Airline was incorporated in the United Kingdom in 2005. Paul Kang founded the company in 2006, following Fujairah Govt. sponsorship approach to operate a low-cost airline between India and the Philippines. The airline originally provided DC10 aircraft but due to less demand by charter companies, operation started with MD83 using a partner company in Philippine and successfully operated for two years.

In 2008, the airline was awarded a contract to fly between the Philippines and Hong Kong, but lack of demand for a charter company to operate in UAE and Asia due to the global recession the idea was dropped. Kang decided to move back to Europe and continue his operation in Europe with lease and aircraft purchasing. Kang Pacific Airline has now diversified into several companies which include distribution and transportation.

== Destinations ==
The inaugural flight of Kang Pacific Airlines was from Fujairah to Manila, via the Bangladeshi capital, Dhaka. Other routes originally planned to follow included East Midlands Airport (the UK) via Fujairah to Amritsar in India Punjab.

As of 2008, the following destinations were planned to be served by Kang Pacific:

- United Arab Emirates
  - Fujairah (Fujairah International Airport), hub
- Bangladesh
  - Dhaka (Shahjalal International Airport)
- India
  - Kochi (Cochin International Airport)
- Philippines
  - Clark (Clark International Airport)
- Sri Lanka
  - Colombo (Bandaranaike International Airport)

== Fleet ==
As of 2009, a fleet of leased McDonnell Douglas DC-10 aircraft were being used, with further aircraft acquisitions expected later with expansion.

=== Former fleet ===
Former fleet of Kang Pacific Airlines:

Kang Pacific Airlines fleet
Aircraft	Total	Passengers	Routes	Notes
McDonnell Douglas DC-10	1	380		Leased
