= Boeing Business Jet =

Executive transport variants of several Boeing airliners

Boeing Business Jets
- Type: Subsidiary
- Industry: Aerospace; Business aviation
- Founded: July 1996; 30 years ago in Seattle, Washington, US
- Founder: Borge Boeskov; Phil Condit (Boeing); Jack Welch (General Electric)
- Headquarters: Seattle, Washington, US
- Key people: Joe Benson (President of Boeing Business Jets)
- Products: Boeing 737 MAX; Boeing 787 Dreamliner; Boeing 777X
- Parent: Boeing Commercial Airplanes
- Website: businessjets.boeing.com

Boeing Business Jets

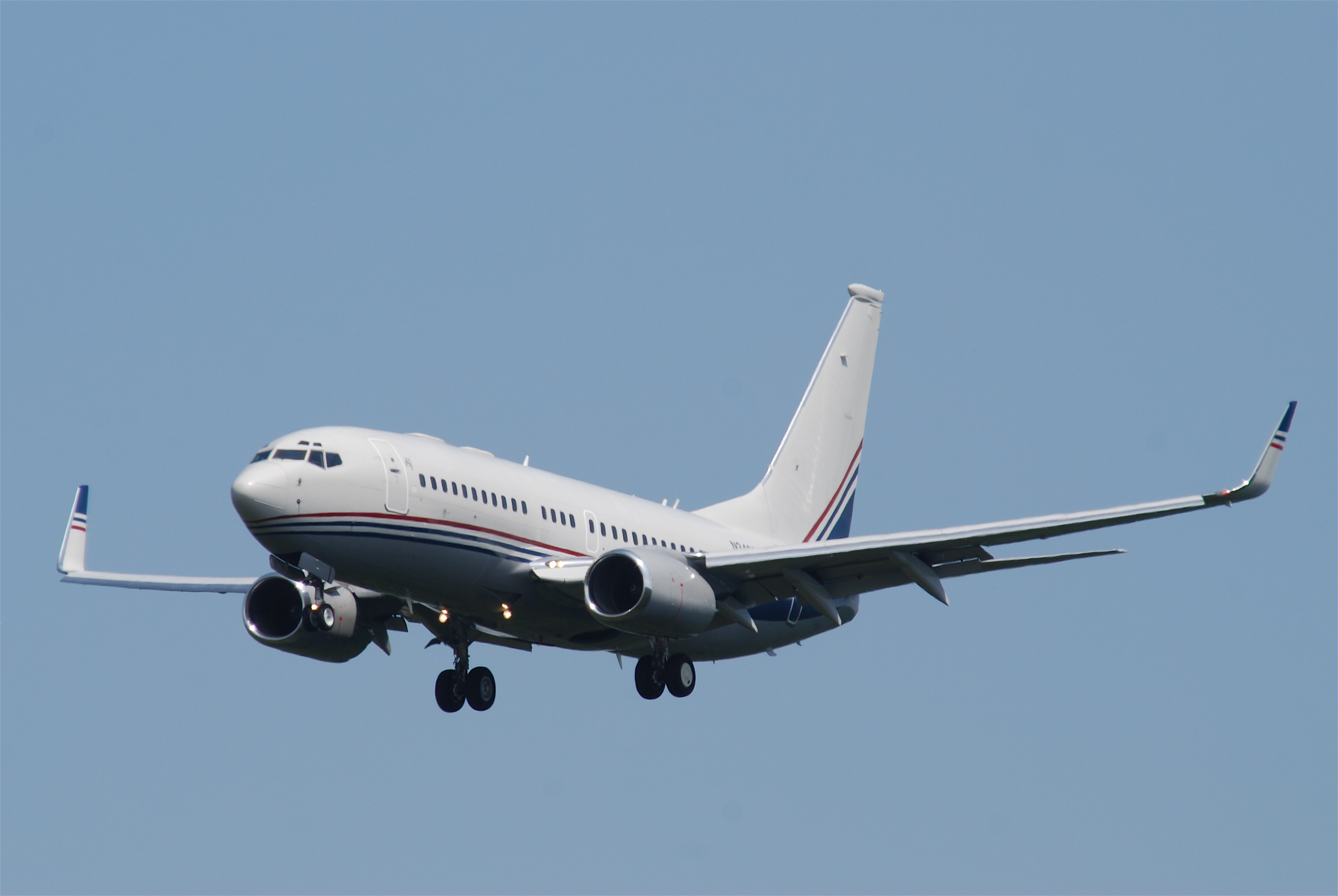
- An original BBJ

General information
- Type: Business jet
- Manufacturer: Boeing Commercial Airplanes
- Designer: Borge Boeskov
- Status: In service
- Number built: +250 (as of December 31, 2021)

History
- Manufactured: 1998–present
- Introduction date: 1999
- First flight: September 4, 1998

A Boeing Business Jet (BBJ) is a version of a Boeing jet airliner with modifications to serve the private, head of state, and corporate jet market. The first BBJ, based on the 737-700, rolled out on July 26, 1998; and had its first flight on September 4, 1998. The BBJ name later came to represent any Boeing aircraft modified to serve in a business jet role.

The first BBJ (later renamed the BBJ1) was first designed in 1996 as a high-performance derivative of the Boeing 737 Next Generation by Borge Boeskov, at the request of Phil Condit, president of Boeing, and Jack Welch, chairman and CEO of General Electric. Since its introduction, over 260 BBJs have been delivered.

Boeing expanded the BBJ brand to include configurations based on the 737 MAX, 777, 777X, 787 Dreamliner and 747-8 Intercontinental, which are known as BBJ 737 MAX, BBJ 777, BBJ 777X, BBJ 787, and BBJ 747-8, respectively. Boeing currently produces the BBJ 737 MAX and BBJ 787.

After the launch of the BBJ, Airbus followed suit with the launch of the Airbus Corporate Jet (ACJ) program. Other smaller competitors include the Embraer Lineage, the Bombardier Global Express, the Gulfstream G550 and the Gulfstream G650.

== Models ==
=== Current production models ===
==== Narrow-body ====
The primary product offered by Boeing Business Jets is the BBJ 737 MAX family. Launch was announced on April 2, 2014, and the first delivery occurred on October 15, 2018. The BBJ MAX replaces and improves upon the original BBJ 737 family, featuring a lower 6,500 ft (2,000 m) cabin altitude for enhanced passenger comfort as well as a 15% reduction in fuel burn and an increase in range to over 6,000 nmi (6,900 mi) brought by new CFM LEAP-1B engines, improved aerodynamics, auxiliary fuel tanks, and other systems.

The BBJ MAX is based on the Boeing 737 MAX family of aircraft. Unlike most commercial 737s, the BBJ MAX is fitted with retractable airstairs to allow independent operations at remote airfields. BBJ MAX aircraft are also equipped with all of the optional extra features available on commercial 737s, as well as the highest takeoff weight certification and maximum available engine thrust option.

The BBJ MAX also benefits from its commercial counterparts. Direct operating costs are estimated at $5,200 to $5,600 per hour, which is lower than many purpose-built business jets of similar size. This efficiency is partly enabled by a low utilization maintenance program, which lengthens the distance between maintenance intervals for BBJ operators – major checks occurring every four years, and heavy checks only once every 12 years.

- BBJ 737-7 (BBJ MAX 7) is a variant of the Boeing 737 MAX 7. It is 6 ft 4 in (1.93 m) longer than the original BBJ1 and features a range of 6,600 nmi (12,225 km; 7,600 mi), which is 445 nmi (825 km; 512 mi) further than the BBJ1. The 737-7 was certified on August 3, 2026, although no deliveries have occurred.
- BBJ 737-8 (BBJ MAX 8) is a variant of the Boeing 737 MAX 8. It first flew on April 16, 2018, and was first delivered in October of that year. The middle member of the family offers a strong combination of size and range.
- BBJ 737-9 (BBJ MAX 9) is a variant of the Boeing 737 MAX 9 and is the largest member of the BBJ MAX family, offering a cabin floor area of 1,120 sq ft (104.1 m^{2}). The first BBJ 737-9 was delivered green on August 18, 2021.

In 2023, the equipped price of the BBJ MAX 7 was $101.5M, $110.5M for the MAX 8, and $118.5M for the MAX 9.

===== Specifications =====
Variant	BBJ MAX 7	BBJ MAX 8	BBJ MAX 9
Cabin	884 sq ft (82.1 m^{2})	1,025 sq ft (95.2 m^{2})	1,120 sq ft (104.1 m^{2})
Cargo	274 cu ft (7.8 m^{3})	593 cu ft (16.8 m^{3})	775 cu ft (21.9 m^{3})
Length	116 ft 8 in (35.6 m)	129 ft 8 in (39.6 m)	138 ft 2 in (42.1 m)
Span × Height	117 ft 10 in (35.9 m) × 40 ft 4 in (12.3 m)		
MTOW	177,000 lb (80.3 t)	181,200 lb (82.2 t)	194,700 lb (88.3 t)
Max Payload	32,500 lb (14.7 t)	35,200 lb (16 t)	38,800 lb (17.6 t)
OEW	106,200 lb (48.2 t)	110,200 lb (50 t)	117,700 lb (53.4 t)
Furnishings	15,500 lb (7 t)	18,000 lb (8.2 t)	21,000 lb (9.5 t)
MEW	90,700 lb (41.2 t)	92,200 lb (41.8 t)	96,700 lb (43.9 t)
Fuel capacity	10,103 US gal (38,244 L)	10,381 US gal (39,296 L)	10,910 US gal (41,299 L)
Engines (2×)	CFM International LEAP-1B		
Range (8 pax)	6,600 nmi (12,225 km; 7,600 mi)	6,465 nmi (11,975 km; 7,440 mi)	6,355 nmi (11,770 km; 7,313 mi)

==== Wide-body ====
BBJ 787 Family: Based on Boeing's commercial 787 Dreamliner, the BBJ 787 is a large business jet featuring a composite airframe and low cabin altitude system. The BBJ 787-8 and the BBJ 787-9 are long-range aircraft, with ranges of 9,960 nmi (18,445 km; 11,460 mi) and 9,475 nmi (17,550 km; 10,904 mi), respectively, with 25 passengers. Eighteen were ordered through September 2022 with sixteen delivered.

BBJ 777X Family: Boeing launched BBJ variants of the 777X at the Middle East Business Aviation Association show in December 2018. The BBJ 777-8 and 777-9 will have ranges of 11,835 nmi (21,920 km; 13,619 mi) and 11,330 nmi (20,985 km; 13,040 mi), respectively, giving it the capability to fly more than halfway around the world without stopping, the longest of any current business jet. Now the largest business jets in the world, these aircraft have cabin areas of 3,256 and 3,689 sq. ft. (302.5 and 342.7 sq m) cabin. The cabin area of the 777-9 is larger than the main deck of a 747-400 and will be 30% cheaper to operate per hour. The 777X is currently undergoing certification before entry into service, currently expected in 2027.

===== Specifications =====
Variant	BBJ 787-8	BBJ 787-9	BBJ 777-8	BBJ 777-9
Cabin	2,340 sq ft (217.3 m^{2})	2,688 sq ft (249.7 m^{2})	3,256 sq ft (302.5 m^{2})	3,689 sq ft (342.7 m^{2})
Cargo	4,397 cu ft (124.5 m^{3})	5,452 cu ft (154.4 m^{3})	6,332 cu ft (179.3 m^{3})	7,705 cu ft (218.2 m^{3})
Length	186 ft 1 in (56.7 m)	206 ft 1 in (62.8 m)	229 ft (69.8 m)	251 ft 9 in (76.7 m)
Span	197 ft 3 in (60.1 m)		235 ft 5 in (71.8 m)	
Height	55 ft 6 in (16.9 m)	55 ft 10 in (17 m)	63 ft 11 in (19.48 m)	64 ft 1 in (19.53 m)
MTOW	502,500 lb (227.9 t)	560,000 lb (254 t)	775,000 lb (351.5 t)	
Max Payload	78,000 lb (35.3 t)	104,600 lb (47.4 t)	138,500 lb (62.8 t)	147,000 lb (66.6 t)
OEW	277,000 lb (125.7 t)	295,400 lb (134 t)	402,500 lb (182.6 t)	415,000 lb (188.3 t)
Furnishings	40,000 lb (18.1 t)	45,000 lb (20.4 t)	55,000 lb (25 t)	65,000 lb (29.5 t)
MEW	237,000 lb (107.6 t)	250,400 lb (113.6 t)	347,500 lb (157.6 t)	350,000 lb (158.8 t)
Fuel capacity	33,340 US gal (126,206 L)	33,380 US gal (126,357 L)	52,136 US gal (197,356 L)	
Engines	GEnx-1B or Rolls-Royce Trent 1000		General Electric GE9X	
Range (25 pax)	9,960 nmi (18,445 km; 11,460 mi)	9,475 nmi (17,550 km; 10,904 mi)	11,835 nmi (21,920 km; 13,619 mi)	11,330 nmi (20,985 km; 13,040 mi)

=== Out-of-production models ===
Narrow-body

The BBJ (retroactively referred to as the BBJ1) was similar in dimensions to the Boeing 737-700 but had additional features, including stronger wings and landing gear from the Boeing 737-800. It offered up to nine auxiliary belly fuel tanks to extend the aircraft's range to over 6,000 nmi (11,000 km; 6,900 mi). Aviation Partners winglets became standard on the BBJ, giving it a 5% range boost. The first BBJ rolled out on August 11, 1998, and flew for the first time on September 4. A total of 113 BBJ1s were delivered to customers.

On October 11, 1999, Boeing launched the BBJ2. Based on the 737-800, it is 19 ft 2 in (5.84 m) longer than the BBJ1, with 25% more cabin space and twice the baggage space, but with slightly reduced range. It is also fitted with auxiliary fuel tanks in the cargo hold and winglets. The first BBJ2 was delivered on February 28, 2001. A total of 23 BBJ2s were delivered to customers.

The BBJ3 aircraft is based on the 737-900ER aircraft. The BBJ3 is approximately 16 feet (4.9 m) longer than the BBJ2 and has a slightly shorter range. Seven BBJ3s were delivered to customers.

During its 20 years of production, 143 BBJs entered service, nearly triple the initial forecast of 50. Boeing delivered the last BBJ based on the 737NG in 2021.

Wide-body

Boeing previously offered BBJs based on the 747-8 Intercontinental, the final model of the venerable 747 family, and BBJs based on the 777 aircraft.

- BBJ 747: The 2nd largest business jet ever produced, it offered over 4,700 sq ft (440 m^{2}) of cabin area, across the main and upper decks. It had a range of 8,875 nmi (16,436 km; 10,213 mi) with 100 passengers. Seventeen were ordered, and all have been delivered.
- BBJ 777: The BBJ 777-200LR and BBJ 777-300ER, based on the commercial 777s of those variants, were offered prior to the introduction of the BBJ 777X family. They offered ranges of 10,030 and 9,300 nmi (18,580 and 17,220 km; 11,540 and 10,700 mi) with 75 passengers, respectively. Seventeen were ordered, and all have been delivered.

== Operators ==
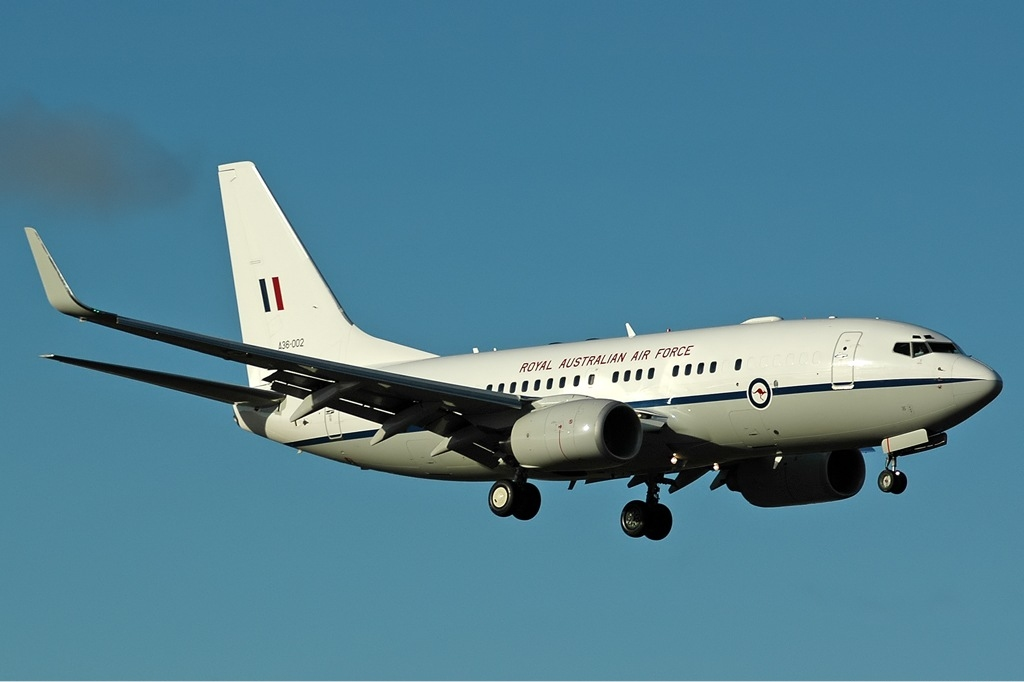
Royal Australian Air Force 737-700 BBJ

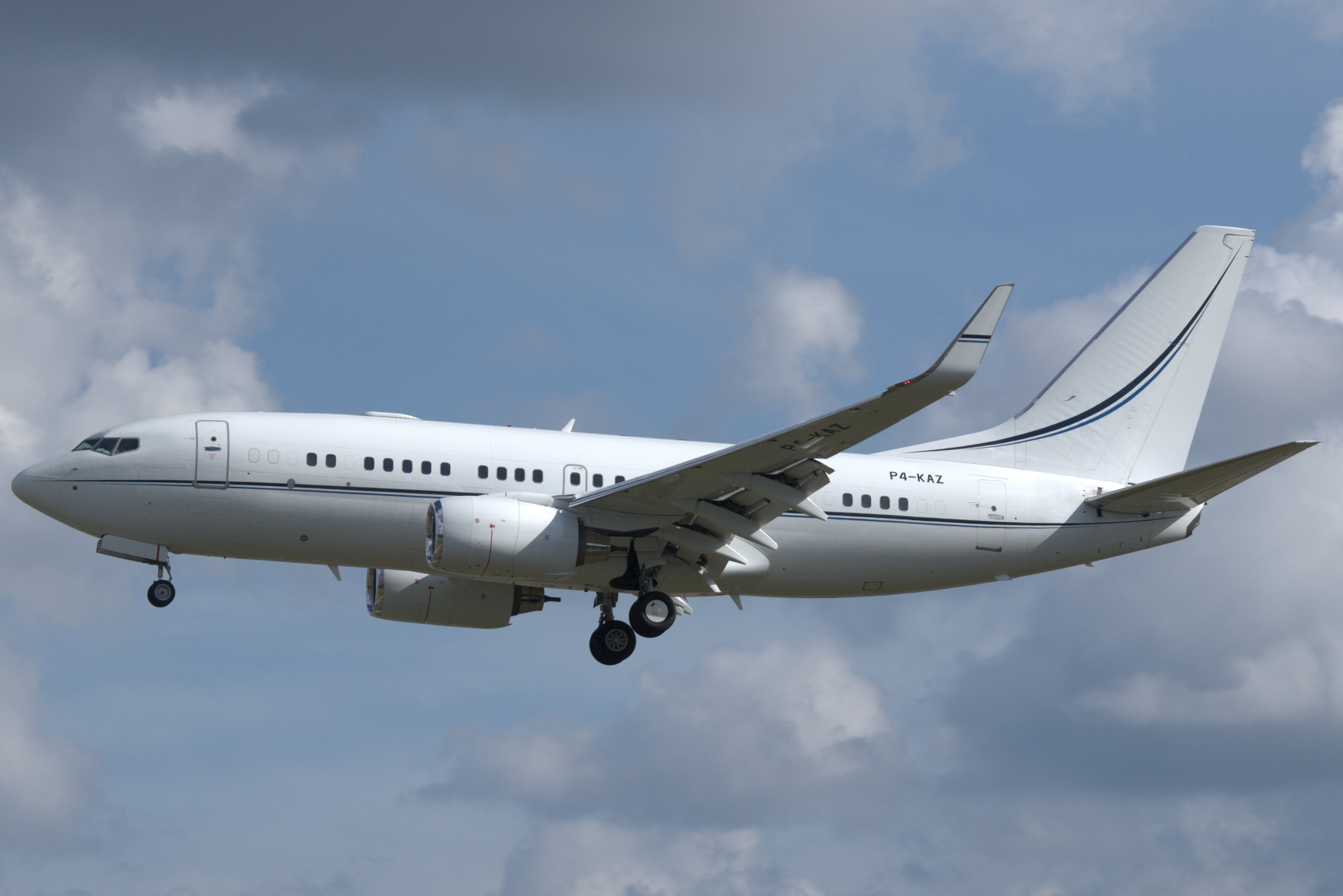
Armed Forces of the Republic of Kazakhstan 737-700/BBJ

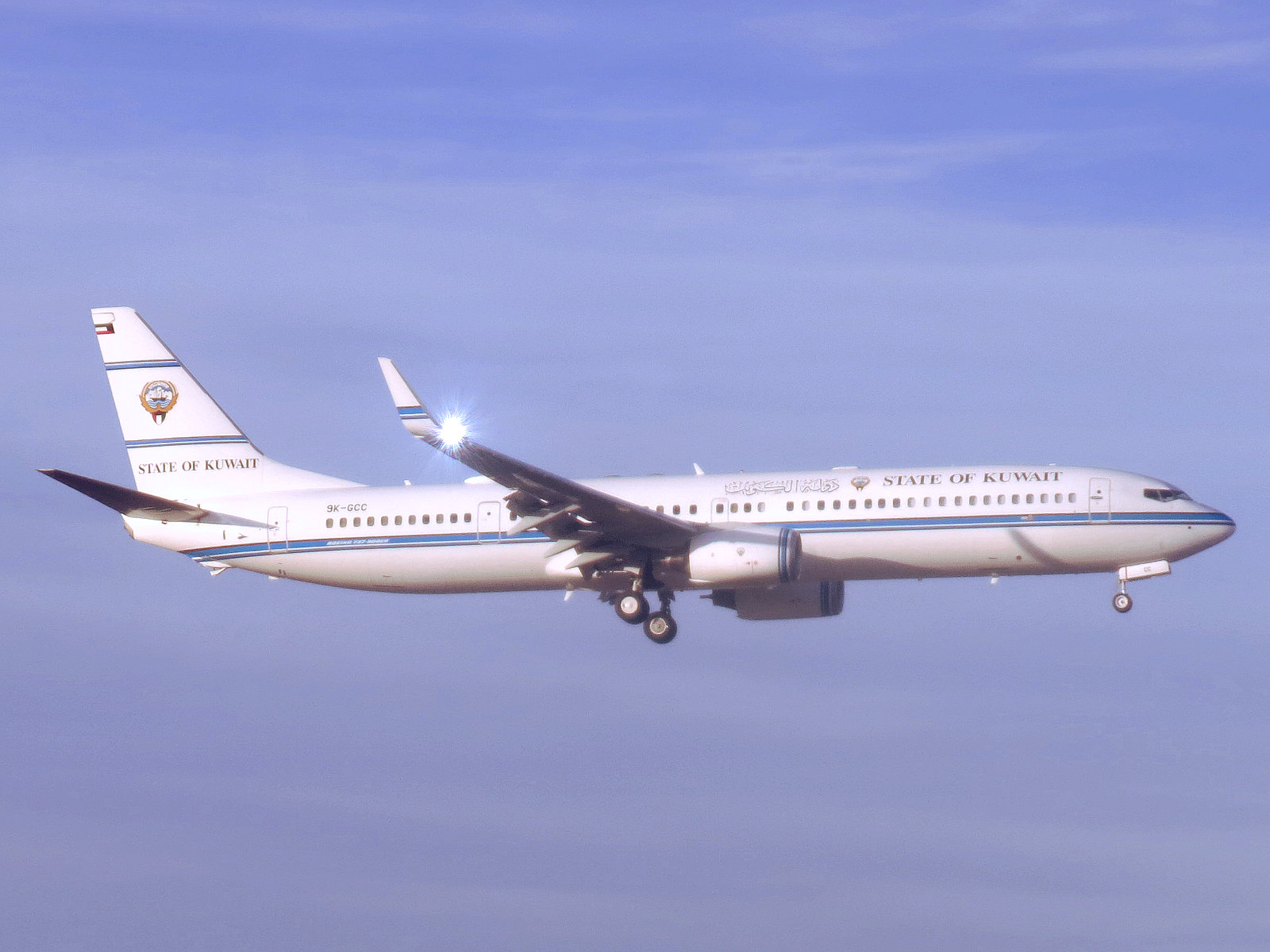
State of Kuwait 737-900/BBJ3

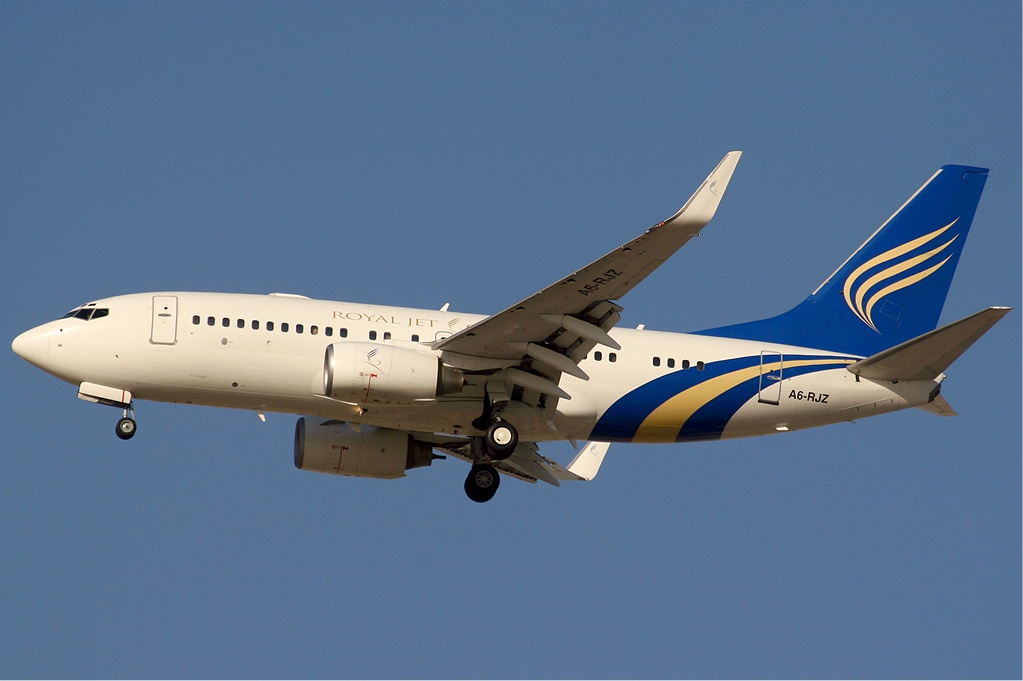
737-700/BBJ of the Abu Dhabi airline Royal Jet

=== Private ===
BBJs were initially operated by Fortune 100 companies like Aramco and Tracinda, NetJets, and casinos like the Las Vegas Sands. However, the 2008 recession put ultra-large jets under scrutiny, and they were divested by many companies including The Limited, General Electric, and Occidental Petroleum. Similarly, Xi Jinping's anti-corruption campaign reduced the conspicuous consumption of private jets in China. BBJs are now operated by private firms and individuals: Fresno's Assemi Group, Miami's Crescent Heights, Wichita's Town & Country Food Market, Funair Corp., toymaker Ty, Fortress Transportation & Instructure, Jeffrey Katzenberg, John Travolta, Steven Spielberg, Washington Corp., Tutor Saliba or pachinko king Hideyuki Busujima, with many registrations hiding their owners’ identities.

=== State VIP users ===
Most BBJs are operated by governments for VIP transport in U.S., Australia and Africa, plus Colombia, Turkey, India, UAE, Jordan, Malaysia, South Africa and Tunisia; or Middle East oil barons like Abu Dhabi, Dubai and Saudi Arabia royalty.

Australia
Royal Australian Air Force (2)

- No. 34 Squadron RAAF

737 MAX 8 BBJ

Belarus
Belarus Air Force (2)

- Boeing 767-32K (EW-001PB) and BBJ2 for Government VIP flight

Colombia
Colombian Air Force (1)

- Grupo de Vuelos Especiales 82 Escuadrón de Transporte Especial 821 for VIP transport

India
Indian Air Force (3)

- Air HQ Communication Squadron for Government VIP use

Indonesia
Indonesian Air Force (2)

- 17th Air Squadron

BBJ1 & BBJ2 for Presidential & Government VVIP flight

Kazakhstan
Armed Forces of the Republic of Kazakhstan (1)
Kuwait
Kuwait Air Force (2)
Madagascar
Presidency (1)
Malaysia
Royal Malaysian Air Force (1)

- 1st Division 2 Squadron for VIP

Mexico
Mexican Air Force (former)

- Boeing 787-8 #40695 acquired in 2014 and sold to Tajikistan in 2023

Morocco
Royal Moroccan Air Force (2)
Netherlands
Royal Netherlands Air Force (1)
Niger
Government of Niger (1)

- 5U-BAG for government VIP flight stored since 2014

Nigeria
Nigerian Air Force (1)

- NAF Mobility Command

Poland
Polish Air Force

- 3rd Transport Aviation Wing Aviation Squadron for government VIP flight, beginning in 2020 (2 BBJ2)

Qatar
Qatar Amiri Flight (1)

- Sold to Moroccan Government in 2010

South Africa
South African Air Force (1)

- 21 Squadron SAAF for VIP transport

Tajikistan
Government of Tajikistan (1)

- Boeing 787-8 (BBJ) for VIP transport

Tunisia
Republic of Tunisia Government (1)
Turkey
Republic of Turkey (1)

- Boeing 747-8ZV (BBJ) for VIP transport

United Arab Emirates
Presidential Flight (9), Royal Jet (6) BBJ1 for Government VIP flight

== Orders and deliveries ==
Through December 2022

Aircraft	737	747	757	767	777	787	Total
Orders	198	17	5	8	17	18	263
Deliveries	190	17	5	8	17	16	253
In service	188	13	5	8	16	14	244

== See also ==
- Environmental impact of aviation – Effect of emissions from aircraft engines

Related development

- Boeing C-40 Clipper

Aircraft of comparable role, configuration, and era

- Airbus Corporate Jets

Related lists

- Air transports of heads of state and government
- List of active United States military aircraft
- List of civil aircraft
- List of military aircraft of the United States
