= RoyalJet =

Emirati charter airline

Royal Jet LLC

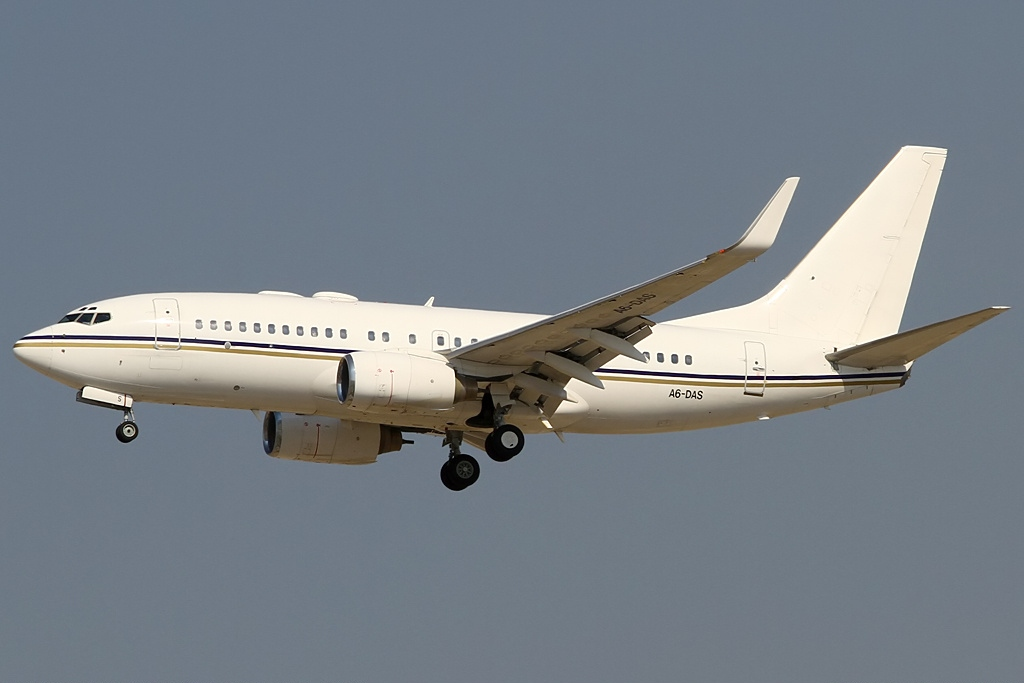
- A Royal Jet Boeing Business Jet (BBJ)
IATA	ICAO	Call sign
-	ROJ	ROYALJET
- Founded: 4 May 2003; 23 years ago
- AOC #: AT-0017 (RoyalJet); 0121 (RoyalJet Bermuda)
- Hubs: Abu Dhabi International Airport; Al Bateen Executive Airport; Al Maktoum International Airport
- Subsidiaries: RoyalJet Bermuda
- Fleet size: 10
- Parent company: Abu Dhabi Aviation; Presidential Flight
- Headquarters: Abu Dhabi, United Arab Emirates
- Key people: Mohammed bin Mahfoodh Alardhi (Chairman); Paul De Salis (CEO)
- Website: royaljetgroup.com

Royal Jet LLC, referred to as RoyalJet, is a charter airline based in Abu Dhabi, United Arab Emirates.

RoyalJet has operating bases at Abu Dhabi International Airport, Al Bateen Executive Airport, and Al Maktoum International Airport.

== History ==
The airline started operations on 4 May 2003 as a joint venture by Abu Dhabi Aviation and Abu Dhabi Amiri Flight (since 2009, Presidential Flight).

In 2021, RoyalJet Bermuda, a wholly owned subsidiary of RoyalJet, was launched, flying a single Boeing 737-700 BBJ.

== Fleet ==
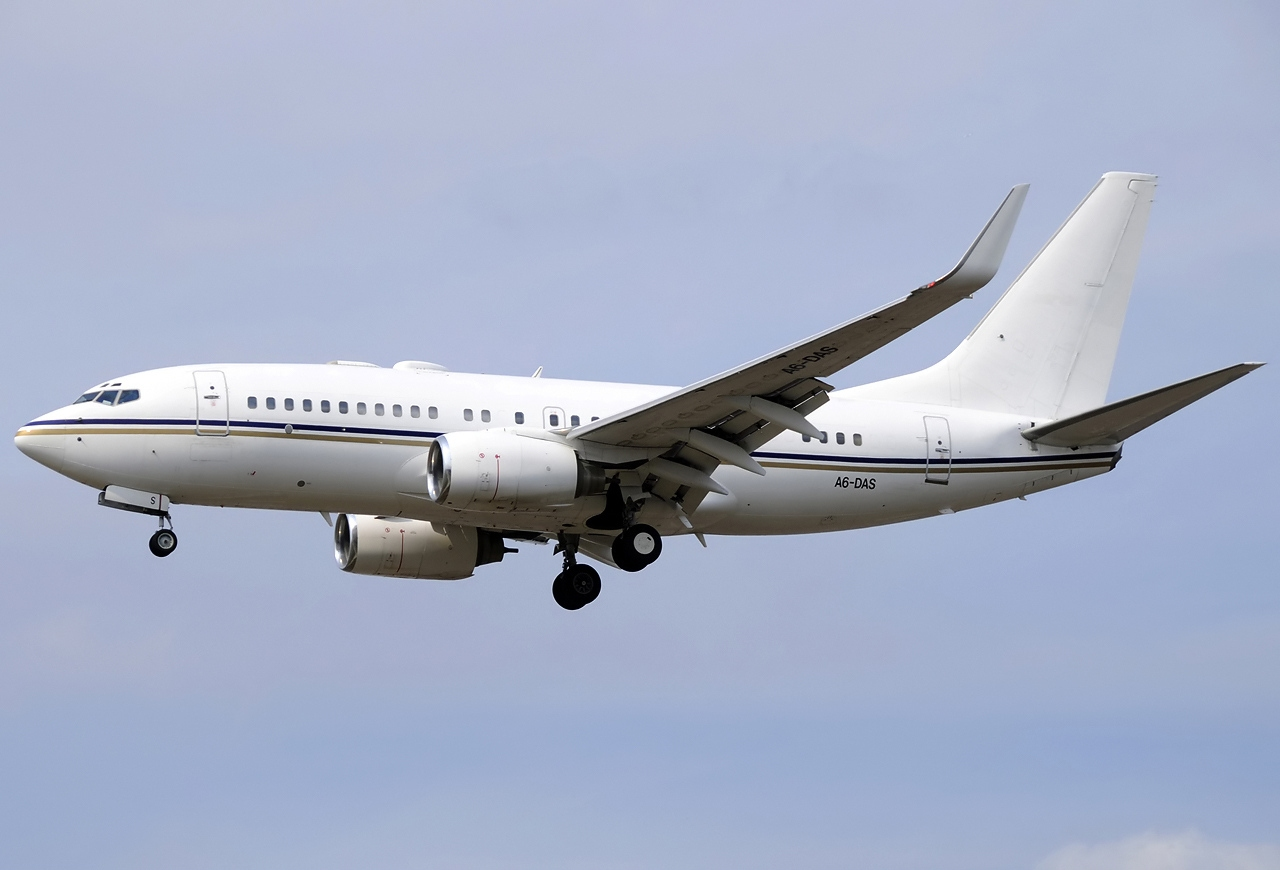
RoyalJet BBJ

The RoyalJet fleet consists of the following aircraft (as of December 2025):

RoyalJet fleet
Aircraft	In service	Notes
Boeing 737-700 BBJ	8	One operated by RoyalJet Bermuda
Bombardier Global 5000	2	
Total	10	
