= Bombardier Challenger 850 =

Business jet

Challenger 800 / 850
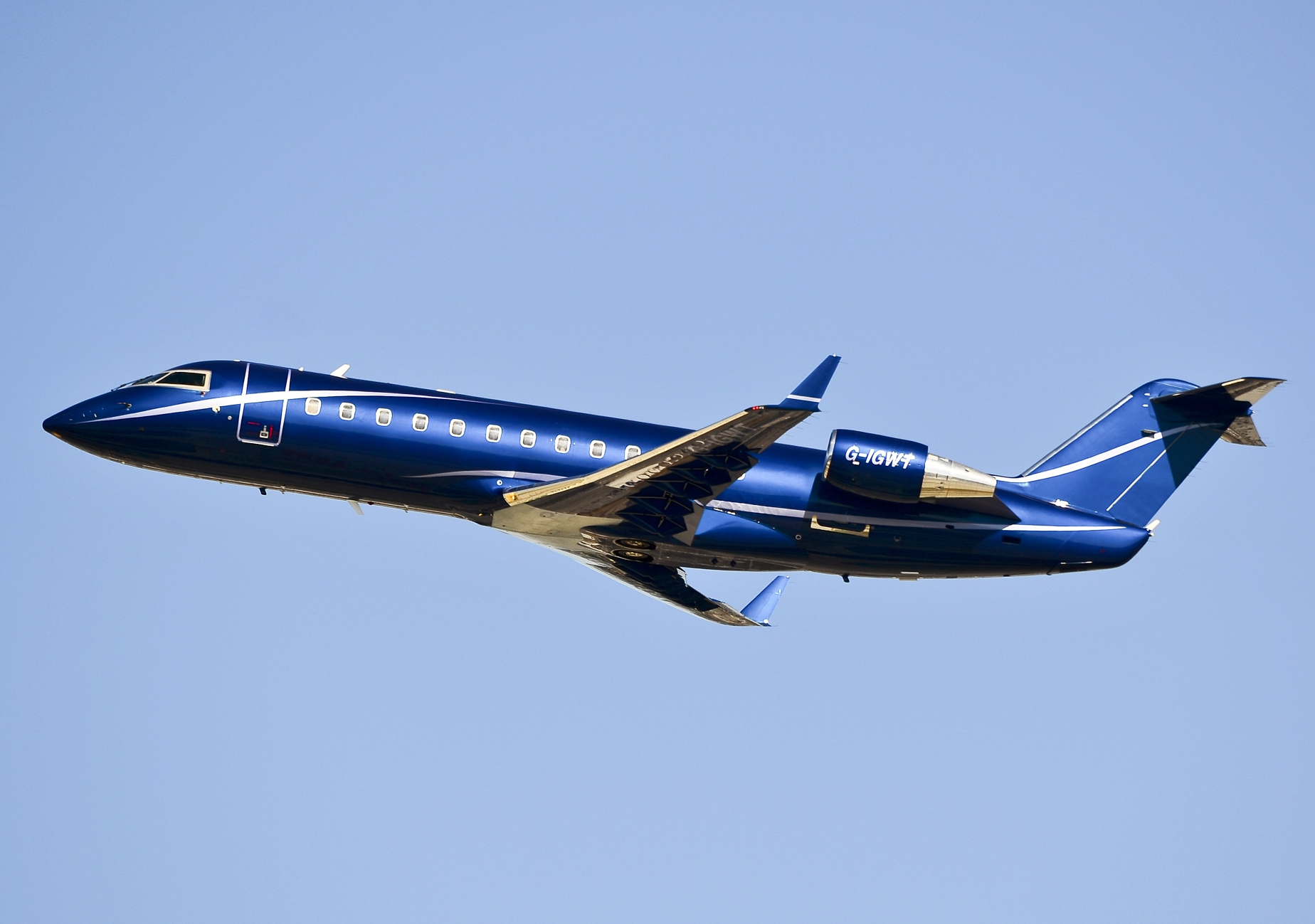
- Challenger 850 taking off

General information
- Type: Business jet
- Manufacturer: Bombardier Aerospace
- Status: Active
- Primary user: AirX Charter

History
- Manufactured: 2006–2012
- Introduction date: 1996 (as Challenger SE)
- Developed from: Bombardier CRJ200

The Bombardier Challenger 800, originally known as the Challenger SE, is the largest super-midsize business jet that was built by Bombardier Aerospace. It is based on Bombardier's 50-seat Bombardier CRJ200 LR. The Challenger 850 is the updated version, produced from 2006 to 2012.

== Design and development ==
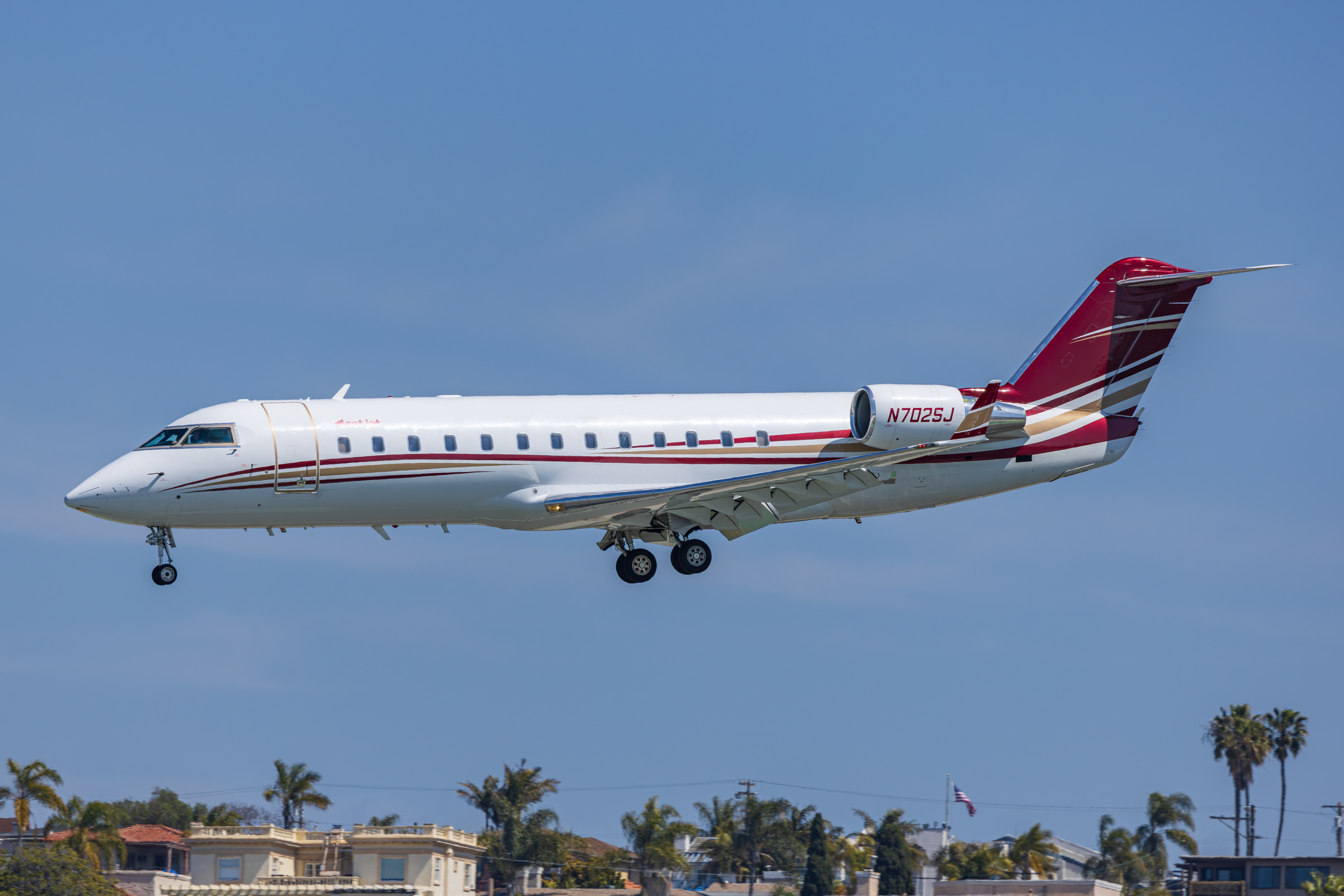
A Challenger 850 landing at San Diego International Airport, 2023

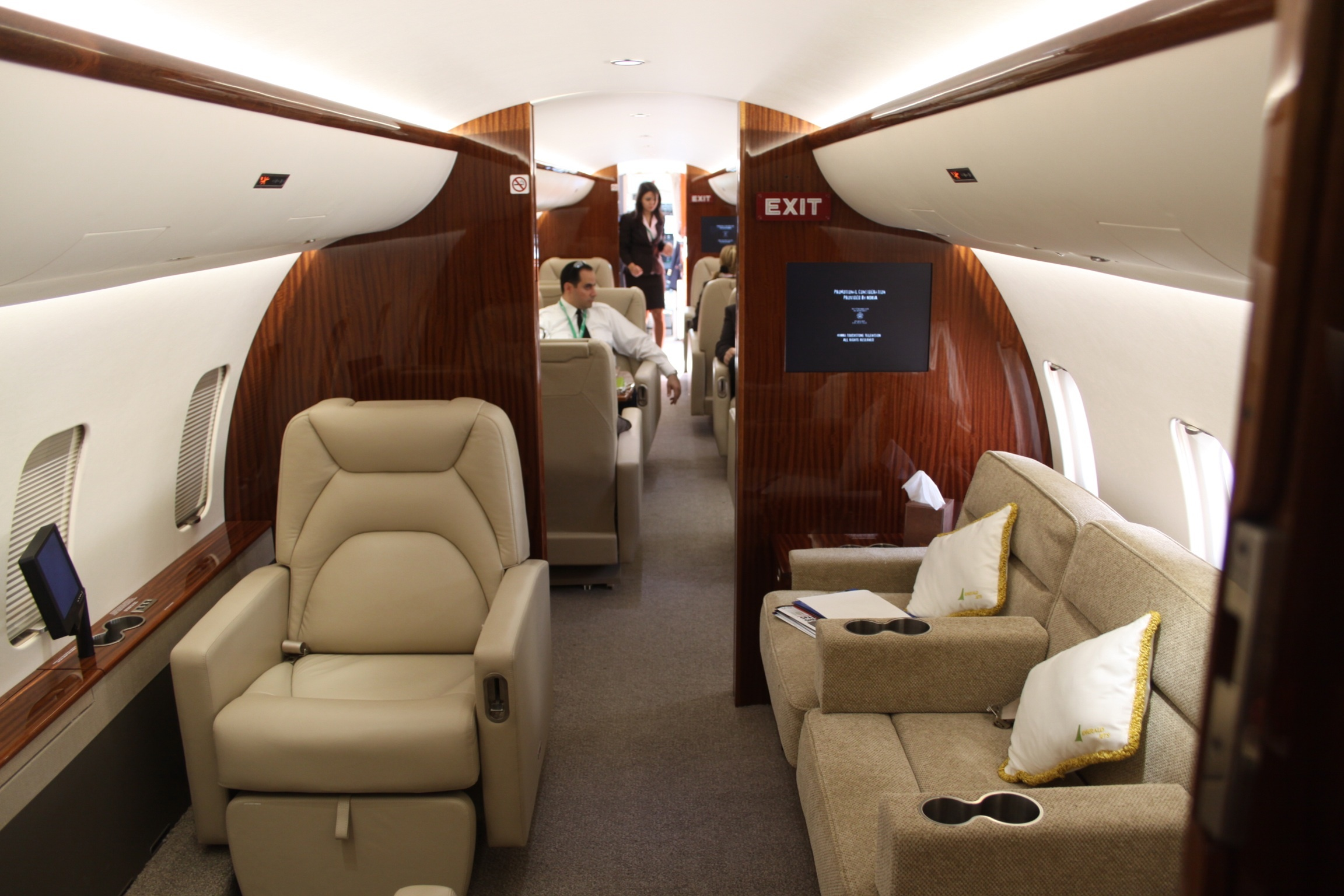
corporate interior

The Challenger 850 is derived from the Bombardier CRJ200 airliner. It is capable of accommodating 12–16 passengers. The Challenger 850 jet has a transcontinental range and a high-speed cruise of Mach 0.80.

The Challenger 850 was first manufactured in 1996 as the Challenger SE (Special Edition) and rebranded in 2006 as the Challenger 850. Production ended in 2012 following completion of 71 deliveries.

"Challenger 850" or "CRJ Special Edition (SE)" are marketing designations for any CL-600-2B19 aircraft that was configured "green" at manufacture and subsequently completed with an interior approved by supplemental type certificate (STC).

== Specifications ==
Data from Bombardier website

General characteristics

- Crew: 2 + 1
- Capacity: up to 16
- Length: 26.77 m (87 ft 10 in)
- Wingspan: 21.21 m (69 ft 7 in)
- Height: 6.22 m (20 ft 5 in)
- Wing area: 48.35 m^{2} (520.4 sq ft)
- Empty weight: 15,440 kg (34,039 lb)
- Maximum ramp weight: 24,154 kg (53,250 lb)
- Maximum takeoff weight: 24,040 kg (52,999 lb)
- Maximum landing weight: 21,319 kg (47,000 lb)
- Maximum zero fuel weight: 19,958 kg (44,000 lb)
- Typical basic operating weight: 15,702 kg (34,617 lb)
- Maximum usable fuel weight: 8,289 kg (18,274 lb)
- Maximum payload (D-E): 4,256 kg (9,383 lb)
- Payload – full fuel (A-E-F): 162 kg (357 lb)
- Fuel with maximum payload (A-D): 4,196 kg (9,251 lb)
- Powerplant: 2 × General Electric CF34-3B1 turbofan engines, 38.84 kN (8,730 lbf) thrust each 41 kN (9,217 lbf) for take=off in ISA + 8°C (73°F)

Performance

- Maximum speed: Mach (V_{mo}) 0.850
- Cruise speed: 819 km/h (509 mph, 442 kn)
- High-speed cruise: M0.80 / 850 km/h (459 kn; 528 mph)
- Long-range cruise speed: M0.74 / 787 km/h (425 kn; 489 mph)
- Range: 5,206 km (3,235 mi, 2,811 nmi) at M 0.74

(Theoretical range with NBAA IFR Reserves, ISA, 8 pax/2 crew. Actual range will be affected by speed, weather, selected options and other factors.)

- Service ceiling: 12,500 m (41,000 ft)
- Balanced field length (SL, ISA, MTOW): 6,305 ft (1,922 m)
- Landing distance (SL, ISA, MLW): 2,910 ft (887 m)
- Noise Level: Flyover: 78.8, Approach: 92.1, Lateral: 82.4 (EPNdB)

Avionics

- Rockwell Collins Pro Line 4 six-screen EFIS
- Two-Screen EICAS
- Dual FMS 4200
- Dual GPS
- Dual IRS
- Dual DME/ Dual ADF
- Enhanced Ground Proximity Warning System (EGPWS)
- Traffic Collision Avoidance System (TCAS II)

== See also ==
Related development

- Bombardier CRJ200
- Bombardier Global 6000
- Bombardier Challenger 600
- Bombardier Challenger 300

Related lists

- List of civil aircraft
