= Al Jaber Aviation =

Business jet airline in the UAE

IATA	ICAO	Call sign
-	LJB	AL JABER
- Founded: 2004
- Ceased operations: 9 March 2019
- Hubs: Al Bateen Executive Airport
- Fleet size: 2
- Headquarters: Abu Dhabi, United Arab Emirates
- Key people: Mohammed Al Jaber (President); Bilal Yousuf (COO)
- Website: www.ajaprivatejets.com

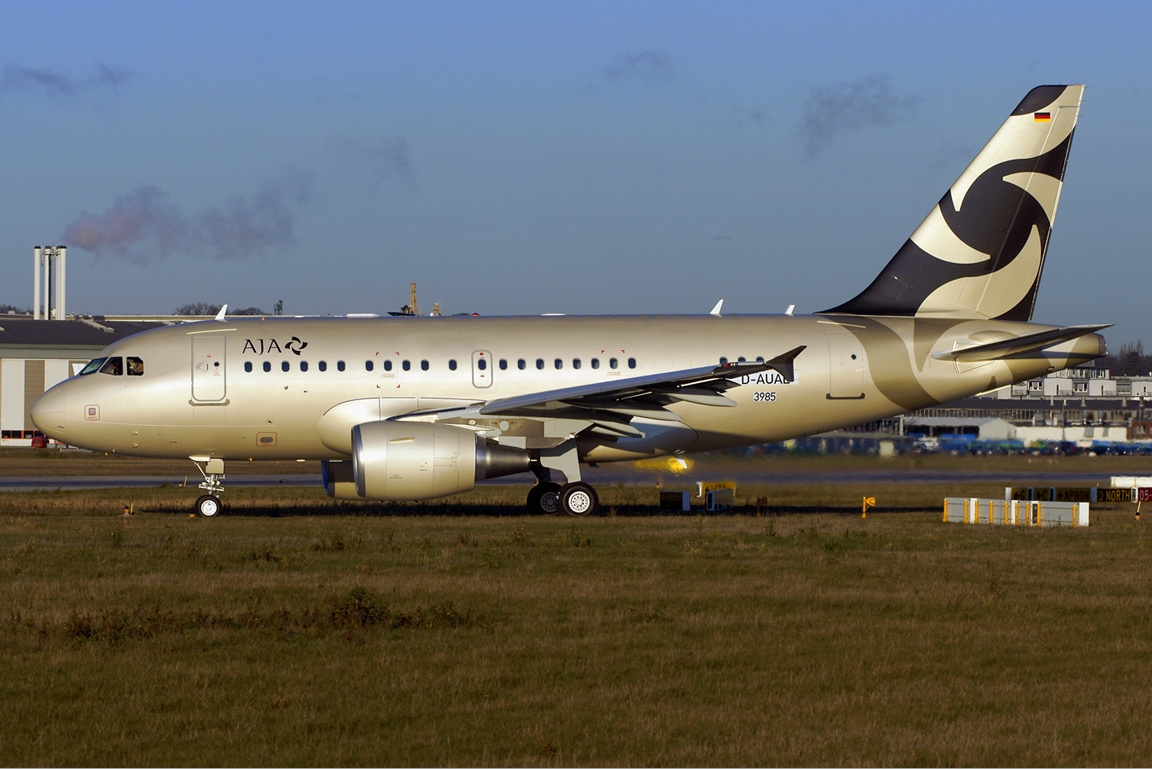
An Al Jaber Aviation Airbus A318CJ

Al Jaber Aviation (AJA) was a business jet airline based in Abu Dhabi, United Arab Emirates.

== History and profile ==
The AJA was part of the Al Jaber Group. The main hub of the AJA was Al Bateen Executive Airport. In addition to executive business flights, AJA dealt with aircraft management, sales, acquisitions and consultancy. Mohammed Al Jaber was its chief executive officer and Bilal Yousuf was its chief operating officer. AJA ceased operations on 9 March 2019.

== Fleet ==
The Al Jaber Aviation fleet includes the following aircraft (as of August 2016):

Al Jaber Aviation fleet
Aircraft	In fleet	Orders	Passengers	Notes
Airbus A318-100 CJ	1	—		
Embraer Lineage 1000	1	—		
Total	2			

In 2007, the airline became the first company in the United Arab Emirates to purchase the Airbus A318 Elite. The airline's fleet included the following aircraft types as of 31 July 2011: A318, EMB Lineage 1000 and ERJ Legacy 600. AJA had a fleet of five owned aircraft, one A318-Elite plus, two Lineage 1000s, and two Legacy 600s.
