= Maximus Air =

Emirati cargo airline

IATA	ICAO	Call sign
6M	MXA	CARGO MAX
- Founded: 2004
- Hubs: Abu Dhabi International Airport
- Fleet size: 3
- Headquarters: Abu Dhabi, United Arab Emirates
- Key people: Mohamed Ebrahim Al Qassimi, CEO
- Website: maximus.aero

Maximus Air is a cargo airline based at Abu Dhabi International Airport in the United Arab Emirates.

== History ==
The airline was established in 2004 as Experts Air Cargo and was renamed in 2006.

In 2011, it announced the purchase of three Airbus A300-600 previously operated by Japan Airlines for freighter conversion by EADS EFW in Dresden, Germany. However, the entire fleet of then overall five Airbus A300 freighters was subsequently grounded in 2015 stating an insufficient cost basis to keep them operating.

== Destinations ==
Maximus Air operates cargo services across the Middle East, Europe, Africa and Asia. The airline formerly ran regular scheduled cargo services on behalf of Etihad Cargo.

It also has been appointed as an air relief support partner of the Red Crescent of the UAE. In 2017, the airline additionally signed a contract with the Ministry of Defense of the United Arab Emirates.

== Fleet ==
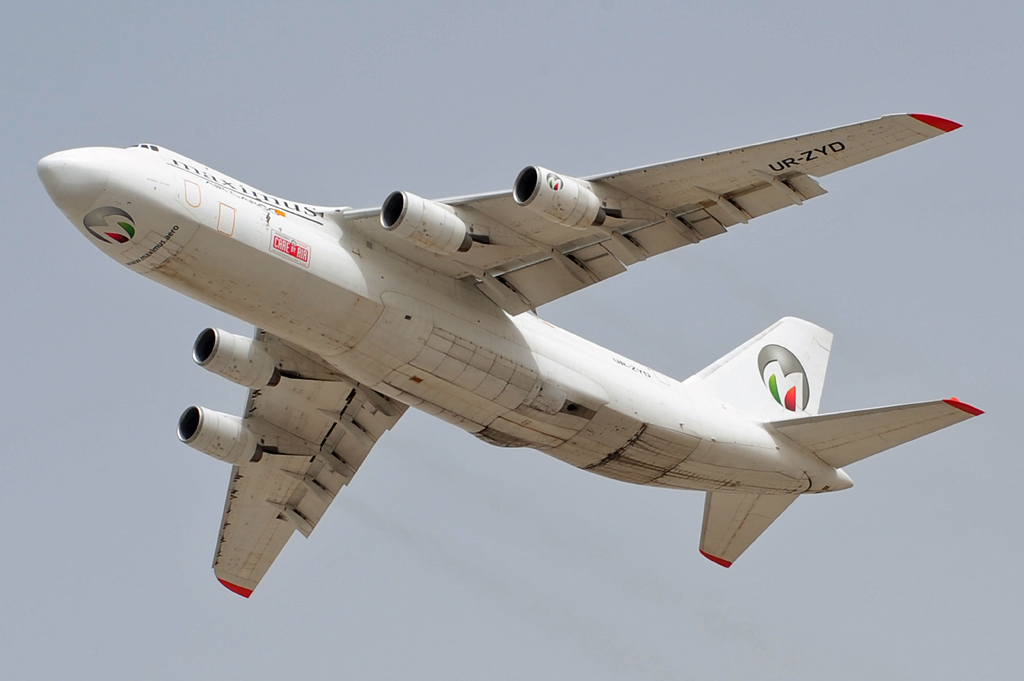
Maximus Air Antonov An-124

As of March 2024, Maximus Air fleet consists of the following aircraft:

Aircraft	Total	Orders	Notes
Antonov An-124	1	—	Cargo
Ilyushin IL-76TD	2	—	Cargo
Total	3	—	
