= Midex Airlines =

IATA	ICAO	Call sign
MG	MIX	MIDEXCARGO
- Founded: 2007
- Ceased operations: 2015
- Hubs: OMSJ - Sharjah International Airport
- Fleet size: 9
- Destinations: 17
- Headquarters: Abu Dhabi, United Arab Emirates
- Key people: Issam Khairallah (President)
- Website: http://www.midexairlines.com

Midex Airlines was a cargo airline based in the United Arab Emirates. Licensed for both cargo and passenger services in 2007, the airline concentrated on scheduled cargo services. Passenger service never started. Scheduled cargo service had been operated from Al Ain to Paris-ORY for few months, and subsequently closed due to lack of freight.

Midex ended operations in 2015.

== Destinations ==
Midex Airlines ran an ADHOC Cargo operation, mostly operating from Sharjah International Airport. Usual destinations included until May 2012:

- Bagram AF Base, Kabul and Kandahar in Afghanistan (A300 and 747)
- Karachi, Islamabad, Sialkot and Lahore in Pakistan (A300 and 747)
- Yekaterinburg in Russia (A300)
- Bergamo in Italia (A300)
- Dubai, Abu Dhabi and Fujairah in the United Arab Emirates (A300 and 747)
- Sana'a, Yemen (A300)
- Shanghai, China (747)
- Rio de Janeiro, Brazil (747)
- Amsterdam, the Netherlands (747)
- Frankfurt-Hahn, Germany (747)
- Ankara, Turkey (747)
- Minsk, Belarus (747)

From June 2012, the only destination left was Kabul, which was served with a B747.

== Fleet ==
The Midex Airlines fleet includes (as of May 2012):

Midex Airlines Fleet
Aircraft	In service	Capacity	Routes
Airbus A300B4-203F	0		
Boeing 747-228F	0	110 Tonnes	
Total	0		
