= Abu Dhabi Aviation =

Emirati airline

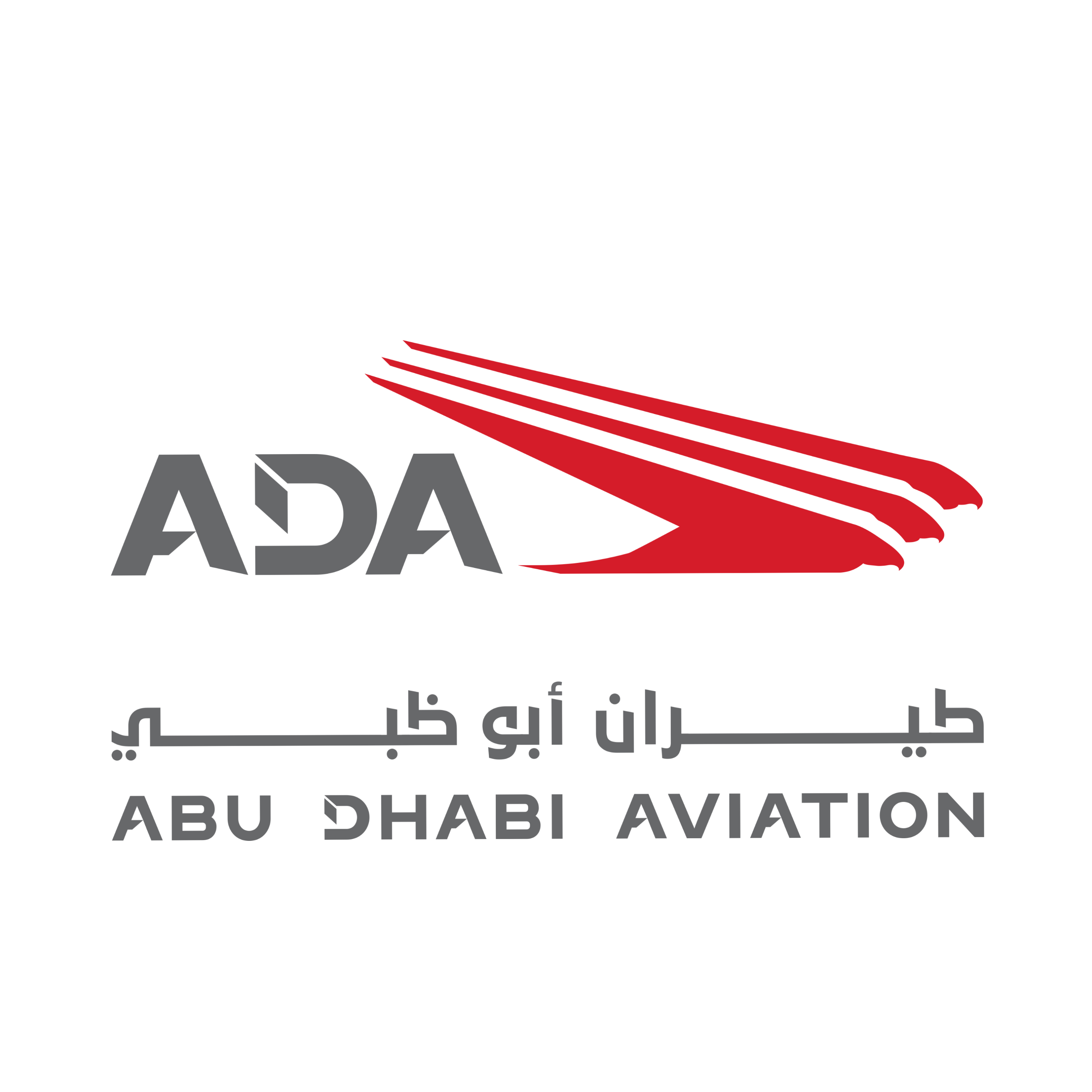
IATA	ICAO	Call sign
-	AXU	-
- Founded: 1975; 51 years ago
- Hubs: Zayed International Airport
- Fleet size: 61
- Headquarters: Abu Dhabi, UAE
- Key people: Nadir Al Hammadi (Chairman); Ahmed Al Dhaheri (Vice Chairman); Mohammed Al Mazrouei (General Manager); Mohamed Saeed Al Remeithi (Deputy General Manager); Ashraf Fahmy (Chief Financial Officer); Dr. Mark Pierotti (Commercial Director); Herbert Brantl (Operations Director); Ian Taverner (Engineering Director)
- Website: ada.ae

Abu Dhabi Aviation Co. (Arabic: شركة طيران أبوظبي) (ADX: ADAVIATION) is an airline based in Abu Dhabi, United Arab Emirates. It serves oil-fields and economic facilities in the United Arab Emirates and other Arab states. Its main base is Zayed International Airport. Abu Dhabi Aviation is the largest commercial helicopter operator in the Middle East, operating and owning 58 aircraft in total comprising 51 helicopters. (16 AgustaWestland AW139s, 22 Bell 412s, 12 Bell 212s, 1 EC-135), and 7 fixed-wing aircraft (DHC-8). The company employs over 1000 personnel, including 130 pilots and 250 engineers. The bulk of the company's business activity is in support of Abu Dhabi offshore oil and engineering and construction companies. Other business activities include medical evacuation, aerial construction, survey, photography, charter, and providing VVIP passenger transportation services. All aerial spraying of crops in the UAE and the majority of aerial spraying in Oman is carried out by ADA.

Abu Dhabi Aviation Group companies are: Maximus Air, ADA Millennium, ADAIRE, Abu Dhabi Aviation Training Center, Royal Jet, Agusta Westland Aviation Services LLC, ADA Real Estate Management and General Maintenance LLC.

Abu Dhabi Aviation Training Center (ADATC) is a pilot training service provider for commercial and military pilots utilizing CAE full flight level "D" simulators; AW139, Bell 412, EMB 145 and King Air 350.

== History ==
The airline was established in 1975 and started operations in March 1976. It began with helicopter operations and added fixed-wing aircraft in 1991. A third-party maintenance facility was opened in 1994. It is owned by Abu Dhabi nationals (70%) and the Abu Dhabi government (30%) and has 960 employees (at March 2013).

By 1983, the fleet size had increased to a total of 34 aircraft, flying over 38,800 hours annually, an average of over 100 hours per day. In 1985, Abu Dhabi Aviation was authorised to operate fixed-wing aircraft and to conduct third-party aircraft maintenance. In 1991, Abu Dhabi Aviation was awarded its first fixed-wing aircraft contract. This contract, with the largest oil company in the UAE, is now operated with three new DHC-8 aircraft.

Abu Dhabi Aviation has completed contracts throughout the Middle East and beyond, including Saudi Arabia, Qatar, Kuwait, Sultanate of Oman, Republic of Yemen, Spain, Pakistan, Eritrea, Brazil, Papua New Guinea, Australia, India, Afghanistan and Indonesia. Seismic surveys in search of oil and other natural resources have been completed using specialist underslung load techniques using a 100 feet (30 m) "long line", thus enabling the helicopter to remain clear of obstructions. The same technique has been used to conduct other work, such as erecting pylons, as part of government schemes to bring electricity to remote areas, and construction of microwave towers.

ADA has operated one Bell 212 helicopter in support of long-term contracts for a major oil company in the Republic of Yemen. The company has a firefighting contract in Spain.

ADA is approaching 1,000,000 flight hours in helicopters and over 55,000 hours in fixed-wing aircraft. Bell Helicopter awarded Abu Dhabi Aviation with a plaque to commemorate the completion of 700,000 helicopter hours. The high intensity of offshore oil support work has required an annual average of approximately 200,000 landings and take-offs. In an average month, 15,000 passengers and 162,000 kg (357,000 lb) of freight are transferred to and from offshore areas. In addition, over 11,000 passengers are moved between offshore locations.

== Abu Dhabi Aviation Strategic Organization Structure View ==
Abu Dhabi Aviation Organizational Chart

=== Fleet ===
The Abu Dhabi Aviation fleet includes the following aircraft:

- 2 Bombardier Dash 8 Q200
- 3 Bombardier Dash 8 Q300(as of August 2025)
- 2 Bombardier Dash 8 Q400(as of August 2025)
- 17 AgustaWestland AW139
- 12 Bell 212
- 22 Bell 412 EP & EPi
- 1 Eurocopter EC 135
- 2 AgustaWestland AW169
