= Royal Flight =

Royal Flight may refer to:

- Royal Canadian Air Force VIP aircraft, air transport for the Canadian Royal Family and other VIPs in Canada
- No. 32 Squadron RAF, the air transport provider for the British Royal Family and other VIPs in the United Kingdom
- Royal Flight (airline), a Russian charter airline based at Moscow Vnukovo Airport
- Presidential Flight (UAE), an organization responsible for air transport of the government of Abu Dhabi, United Arab Emirates
- Dubai Royal Air Wing, an airline used by members of the Dubai Royal Family, as well as VIPs based in Dubai, United Arab Emirates
