= Avia =

Avia may refer to:

== Arts and entertainment ==
- AVIA, a 1980s Russian band
- Maxwell Avia, a Shortland Street character
- Avia and Avia II, of the New Gods in DC comics

== Businesses and organisations ==
- Avia (airline), in South Africa
- Avia (shoes), American shoe manufacturer
- Ateliers vosgiens d'industrie aéronautique (AVIA), a French aircraft manufacturer
- Avia Air, an airline based in Aruba
- Avia Express, a Swedish charter airline
- Avia International, an association of independent mineral oil importers in Switzerland
- Avia Motors, a Czechoslovak automotive manufacturer, founded in 1919 as an aircraft maker
- Avia Solutions Group, an aircraft, crew, maintenance, and insurance provider
- Avia Traffic Company, an airline based in Kyrgyzstan
- Avia Vehicles, a Spanish brand of trucks

== Places ==
- Avia, Messenia, Greece
- Avià, Spain
- Avia (river), in Spain

== See also ==
- Avian (disambiguation)
