= Rand Airport =

General aviation airport of Johannesburg; in Germiston, Gauteng, South Africa

Rand Airport Afrikaans: Randse Lughawe
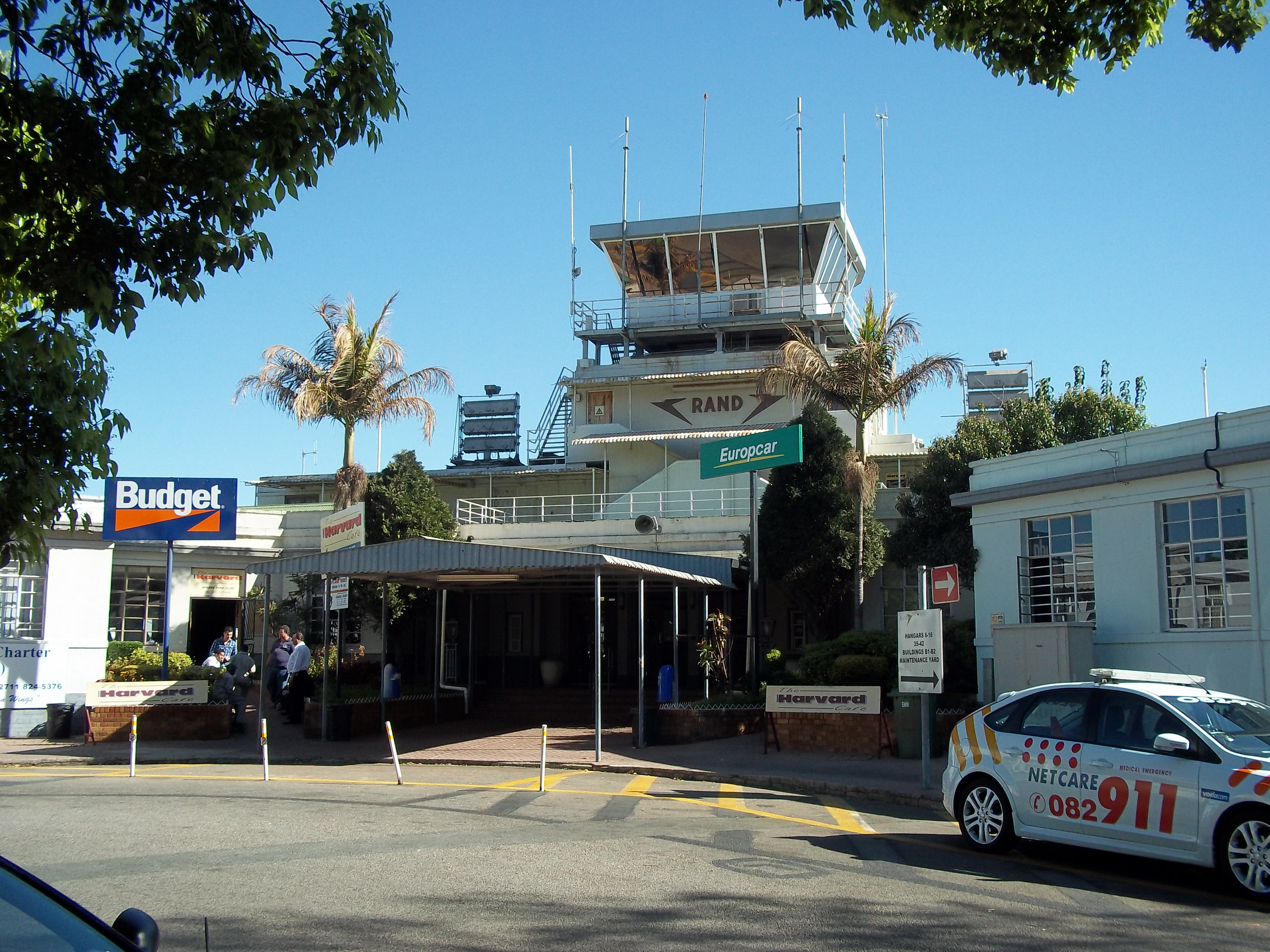
- Rand Airport Control Tower from landside
- IATA: QRA; ICAO: FAGM

Summary
- Airport type: Public
- Operator: Rand Airport Management Company (Pty) Ltd.
- Serves: Johannesburg
- Location: Germiston, Gauteng
- Elevation AMSL: 1,671 m / 5,482 ft
- Coordinates: 26°14′33″S 028°09′04″E
- Website: http://www.randairport.co.za

Map
- Location in the Johannesburg area

Runways
Direction	Length		Surface
Direction	ft	m	Surface
11/29	5,617	1,712	Asphalt
17/35	4,898	1,493	Asphalt

Rand Airport (IATA: QRA, ICAO: FAGM) is an airport in Germiston, South Africa. It was constructed in the 1920s as the main airport for Johannesburg, but the city outgrew it and replaced the airport with Palmietfontein Airport in 1948 (itself replaced by Jan Smuts International Airport in 1952).

== History ==
=== Before World War II ===
In 1917, Major Allister Miller landed on Germiston Golf Course and thought the area close by would be suitable as an airfield due to its location near to Johannesburg, the landmark of Victoria Lake and the well-drained land. But it would take until February 1929, for the three interested parties to agree for 160 hectares (400 acres) of land to be set aside for what was called the Germiston Public Aerodrome. The three parties were the Germiston Town Council, Elandsfontein Estate Company and the Rand Refinery. Later that year, the Germiston Town Council gained full control and further plans were developed for the aerodrome when Imperial Airways was thinking of adding South Africa to their flight schedules. After the involvement of the South African government, they were able to convince the airline that Johannesburg, with its mining and industry, should be their base rather than Cape Town, with Rand Refinery seeking to export its refined gold by air.

Imperial Airways received a £400 000 (equivalent to £23,300,000 in 2025) subsidy from both the South African and UK governments over five years. In November 1929, the Germiston Town Council bought a further 280 ha (700 acres) of land for £14 000, after permission was given by the Mining Commissioner, as the land was owned by the Simmer and Jack mine with the understanding that the land could be reacquired as a mining area. In order to proceed with the development, the Johannesburg and Germiston Town Councils formed a joint committee on 14 November 1930 and £85 000 (equivalent to £4,947,000 in 2025) was set aside for infrastructure. This would consist of a large and small hangar, administrative buildings, a workshop, floodlights and cottages.

The airport was officially opened on 21 December 1931 by the Governor-General Earl of Clarendon and owned jointly by the Germiston and Johannesburg Town Councils. In 1932, Captain Roy Makepeace became its manager. It became the headquarters of South African Airways (SAA) when the airline's head office was moved from Durban to Rand Airport on 1 July 1935. By 1938, the development costs had reached £200 000 (equivalent to £11,600,000 in 2025) and losses of £20 000 (equivalent to £1,164,000 in 2025), a cost the Germiston Town Council could no longer afford and so sold its share to the Johannesburg City Council for £106,498, with 84 hectares (207 acres) of land not used resold to the former and land provided for a future highway to connect to the Heidelberg road. The final transfer took place in 1944.

In early 1939, the Union Defence Force took control of Rand Airport and by May 1940, all commercial flights ended. The training schools based there trained pilots for the war effort and the facilities were extended with fifteen additional hangars built. By 1944, a limited number of internal commercial flights resumed from the airport.

=== After World War II ===
SAA moved its headquarters to Palmietfontein Airport in 1948 because of runway length constraints. Nevertheless, Rand Airport grew quickly after World War II ended because of the influx of former air force pilots. In 1975, with 133 135 recorded aircraft movements, Rand Airport was the busiest airport in the southern hemisphere.

The ownership of the airport originally consisted of 23 private shareholders and there has been very little change. Most of the re-sales have been taken up by existing owners under new company names so there has been a small increase to the current 25 owners, plus the Mayondi BEE consortium and Ekurhuleni Metropolitan Council.

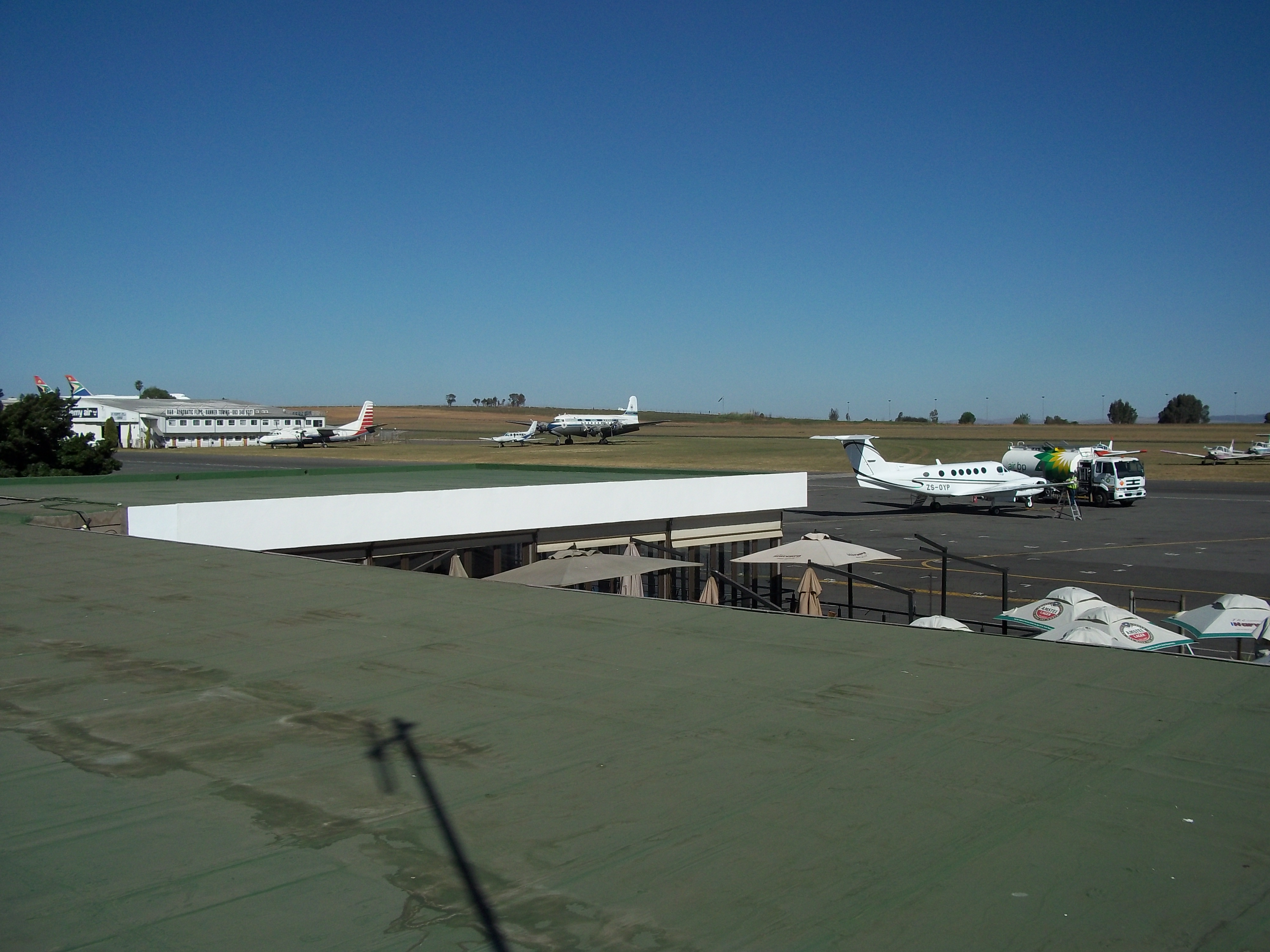
Rand Airport from the observation deck

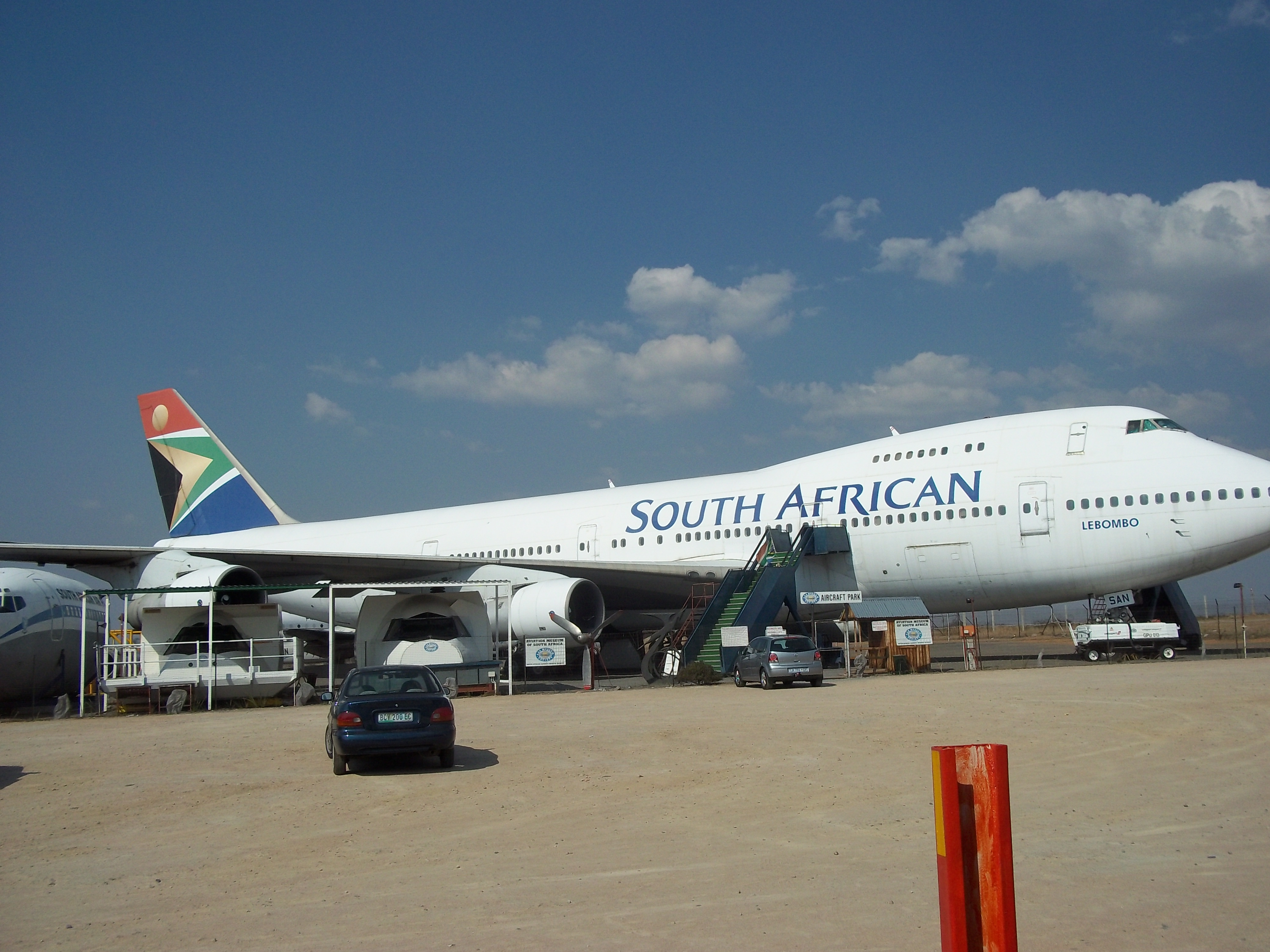
The Lebombo, a retired Boeing 747 from South Africa Airways, on display at the SAA Museum

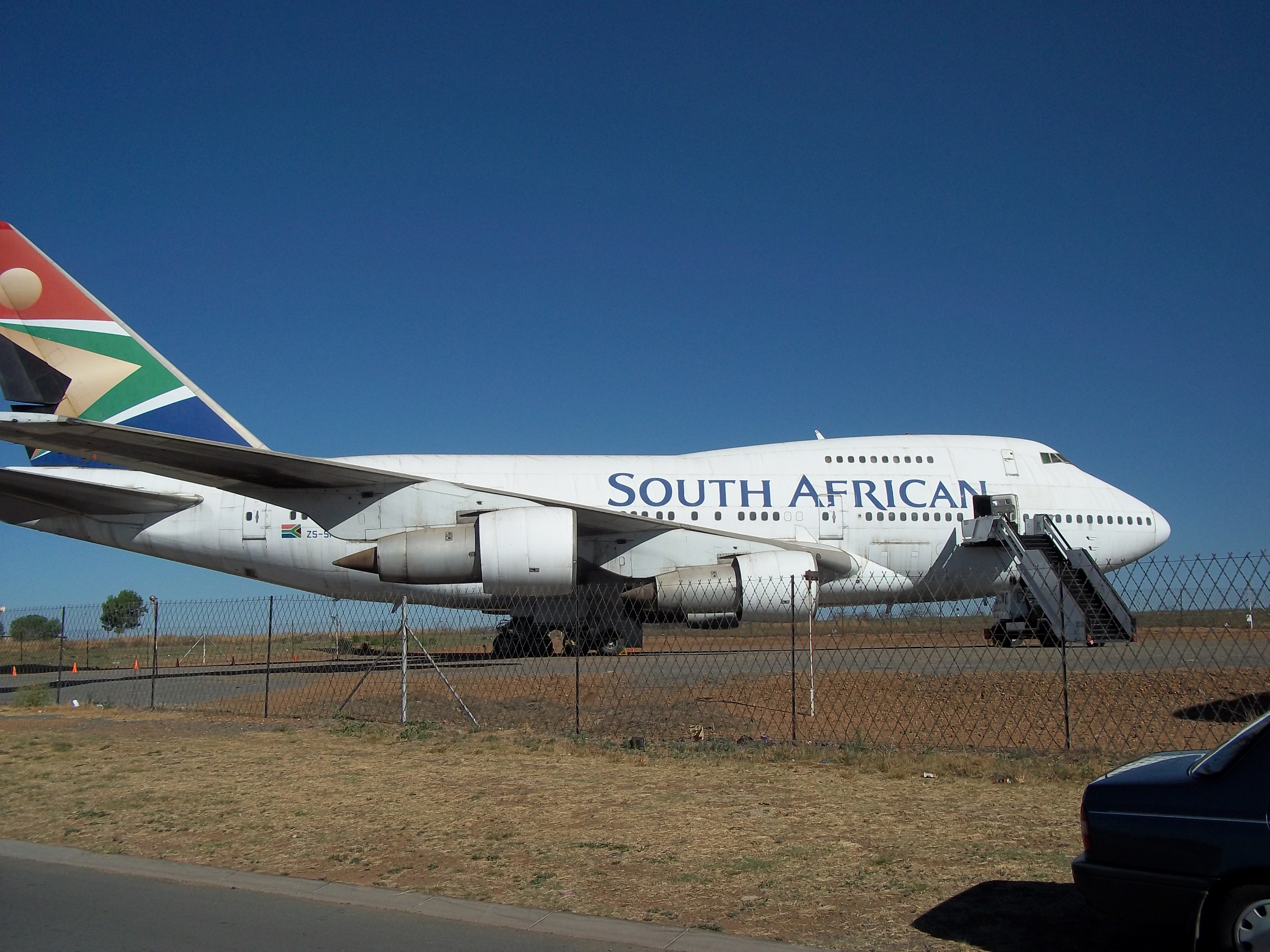
Boeing 747SP at the South African Airways Museum Society situated near the threshold of Runway 29

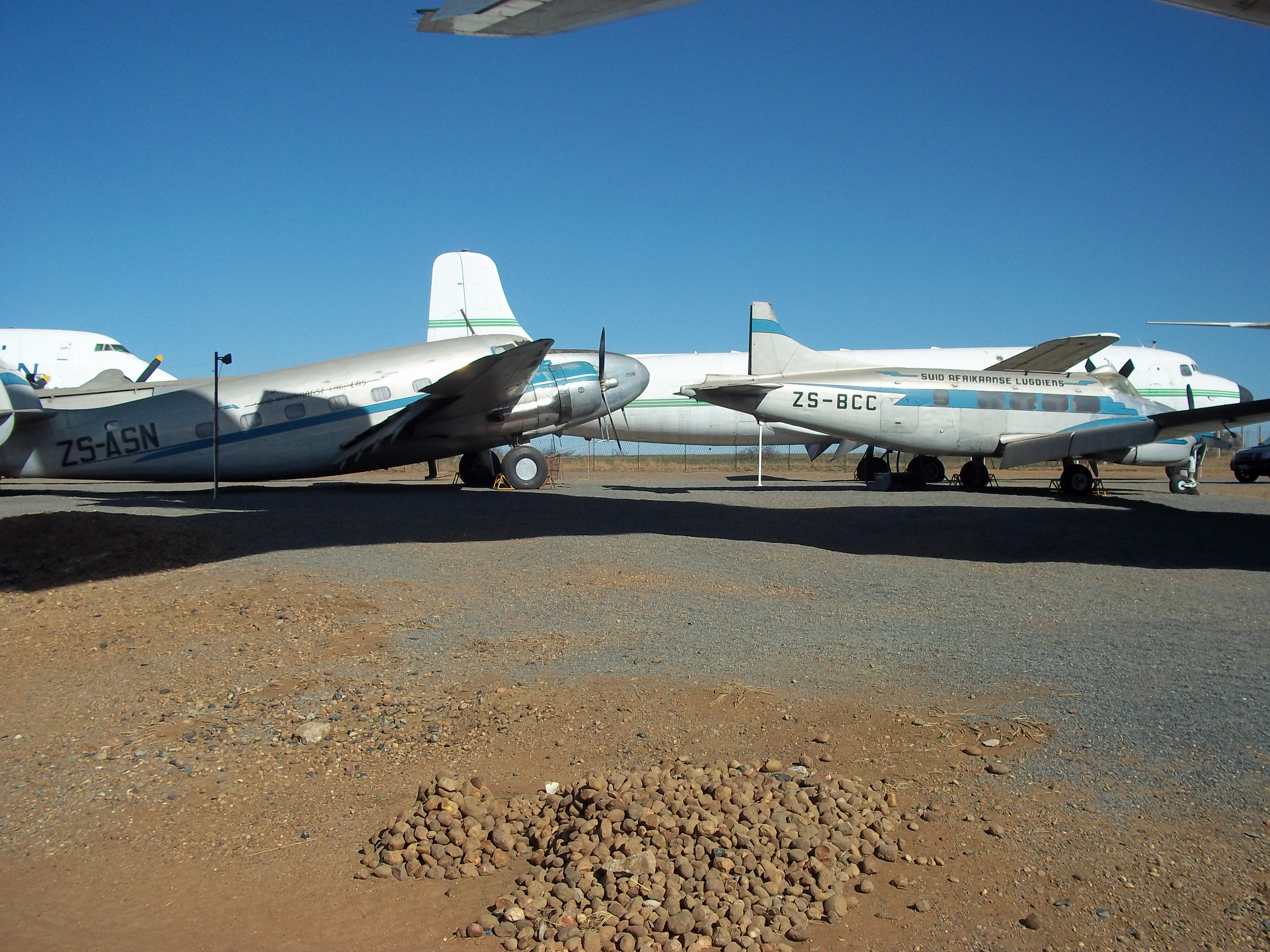
de Havilland Dove and Lockheed Model 18 Lodestar on display at the South African Airways Museum Society at Rand Airport

=== Rand Airport today ===
Today, the airport hosts air charter operators, flying schools and a number of aircraft maintenance organisations, as well other aviation-related enterprises. Charter operator Phoebus Apollo Aviation has its headquarters at Rand; the airport is also home to the Flying Lions Aerobatic Team.

South African Airways donated a Boeing 747-200 and a Boeing 747SP to the South African Airways Museum Society which are on display at the airport. The museum also owns a Boeing 737-200, two DC-4s, a DC-3, Vickers Viking, Lockheed Lodestar, Lockheed L1649 Starliner, DH Dove and numerous other exhibits. The airport also hosts an annual air show.

The airport recently saw extensive industrial development, including new business parks and modern industrial units. These facilities cater to logistics, manufacturing, and other commercial activities, contributing to the region's economic growth. The strategic location and upgraded infrastructure make it a prime site for industrial expansion.

== Airlines and destinations ==
Today, all scheduled flights operate at the nearby O. R. Tambo International Airport.

== Hot and high conditions ==
Rand Airport is notorious for its hot and high conditions and relatively short runways. Situated at an altitude of 1,680 metres (5,510 ft) above sea level, the density altitude is as high as 2,590 metres (8,500 ft) when the outside air temperature (OAT) is 30 °C. Special consideration must be given to flight planning in the summer when the ambient temperature is that high; there have been many accidents at this airfield as a result of reduced aircraft performance under these extreme conditions. A compounding factor is the lack of forced landing fields or areas, as the airport is surrounded by urban sprawl.

== Notable accidents and incidents ==
- On 6 October 1970, at about 7:10 am, Douglas DC-3 registration ZS-DKR en route for Orapa, Botswana crashed as it attempted to return to Rand Airport after the left engine failed just after take-off. There were two crew and ten passengers aboard. The Captain and two passengers subsequently died of injuries. The aircraft was completely burnt-out after impact.
- On 2 August 1995, an Antonov An-2 on a cargo flight from Rand airport to Jamba, Angola, crashed shortly after takeoff killing all three persons on board. The accident was attributed to the cargo which was not properly secured and shifted during the initial climb out, rendering the aircraft uncontrollable.
- On 6 December 1999, a Piper PA-31-350 ZS-OJY crashed shortly after takeoff after suffering an engine failure. All ten people on board were killed.
- On 30 August 2022, a SAPS PC-6 Turbo Porter crashed after takeoff. Reports indicate that five people on board were killed, with one of the pilots in critical condition.
