= South African Airways Museum Society =

- Established: 1986
- Location: Rand Airport, Germiston, Gauteng, South Africa
- Coordinates: 26.241799°S 28.159343°E
- Type: Aviation museum
- Website: www.saamuseum.co.za

The South African Airways Museum Society is an aviation museum based at Rand Airport in Germiston, Gauteng, South Africa. The museum was founded in 1986 and houses a collection of South African Airways memorabilia such as photos and aircraft scale models. The museum also has a collection of static display aircraft including two Boeing 747s donated to them in 2004 and 2006. The museum is funded by entrance fees to the museum and by renting out the aircraft interiors for corporate functions. The flying aircraft of the museum are known as the South African Historic Flight collection, the aircraft are owned by the South African Airways Museum Society and are leased to the company Skyclass Aviation, who operate them for charter usage.

== SAA museum ==
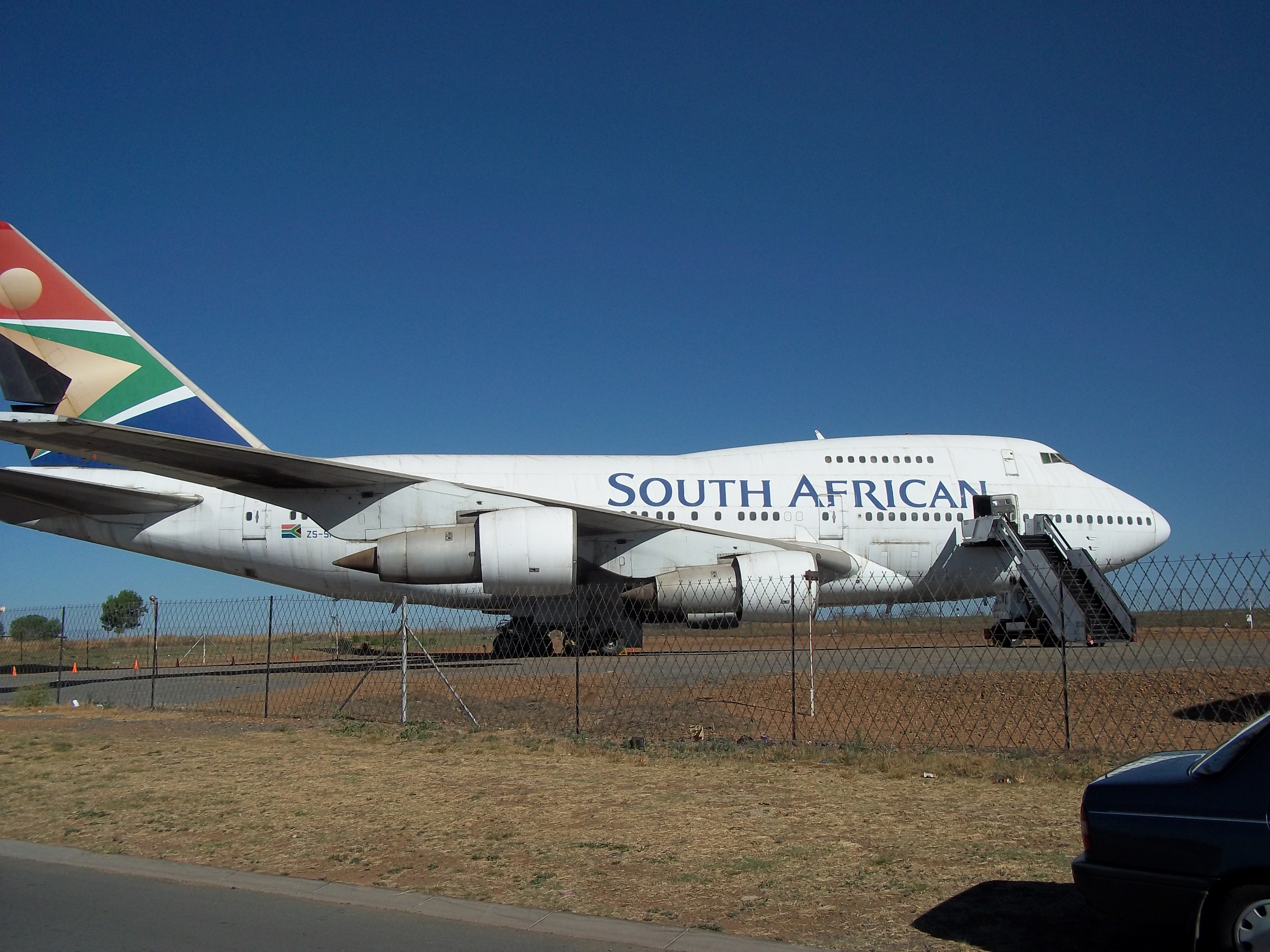
The Boeing 747SP at Rand Airport

The South African Airways Museum Society (SAA Museum Society) was officially founded in 1986 by individuals working at South African Airways (SAA) and other parties who were interested in the preservation of SAA history and South African civil aviation. The interest in starting a museum began when SAA bought a Junkers Ju 52 in 1981, the museum restored the aircraft to flying condition and have been active in preserving SAA history ever since.

In March 2002 the SAA Museum requested that an ex-SAA Boeing 747 be made available. Two 747s were donated to the museum by SAA, a Boeing 747-244 and a Boeing 747SP. On 5 March 2004, the 747-244, registered ZS-SAN and named 'Lebombo', was delivered to the SAA Museum from SAA Technical at Johannesburg International Airport. It landed on Rand Airport's runway 11, which is 15 metres (49 ft) wide and 1,712 metres (5,617 ft) long at an altitude of 1,671 metres (5,482 ft), without the use of reverse thrust. The flight had been postponed twice because of bad weather. The 747SP, registered ZS-SPC, named "Maluti" was delivered on 30 September 2006 and also landed on runway 11.

As of 2020, the museum has a collection of static display aircraft that includes a Lockheed Lodestar, a de Havilland Dove, a Vickers Viking, a Lockheed Starliner, a Douglas C-54, a Boeing 707-320C forward fuselage, a Boeing 737-200, the 747-244B and the 747SP-44.

== SAA historic flight ==
In 1984 the Ju 52 was still flying on an informal basis and not generating the funds required to support itself. In 1989, Captain Flippie Vermeulen, the pilot in charge of the Ju 52, submitted a request for the formation of a profit centre within SAA to manage the Ju 52 operation. Approval was received 23 November 1993. The Historic Flight operated out of Johannesburg International Airport. In 1993, after negotiation with the South African Air Force, the Historic Flight acquired a Douglas DC-3 and a Douglas DC-4. The DC-4 was delivered with a certificate of airworthiness and Vermeulen was able to introduce it to service before the Historic Flight was formally approved by SAA. The SAA Historic Flight was approved and Vermeulen acquired a second DC-3 and a second DC-4. The aircraft performed at airshows in America and Europe from 1994 to 2000. In 1999, a decision was made by SAA to shut down the SAA Historic Flight and dispose of its assets. Vermeulen negotiated with the Transnet Heritage Foundation to take over the aircraft and the SAA Historic Flight became the SA Historic Flight. In 2006 the Historic Flight moved from Johannesburg International Airport to Rand Airport in Germiston. At the end of 2007 all the SA Historic Flight's assets were donated to the SAA Museum Society and one of the DC-3s was sold to Vermeulen.

== Appearances in film ==
Scenes from the film Invictus and several other films and documentaries were filmed around and on board the SAA Museum 747s.

== See also ==
- South African Air Force Museum
