= Boeing 747SP =

Shortened version of the Boeing 747

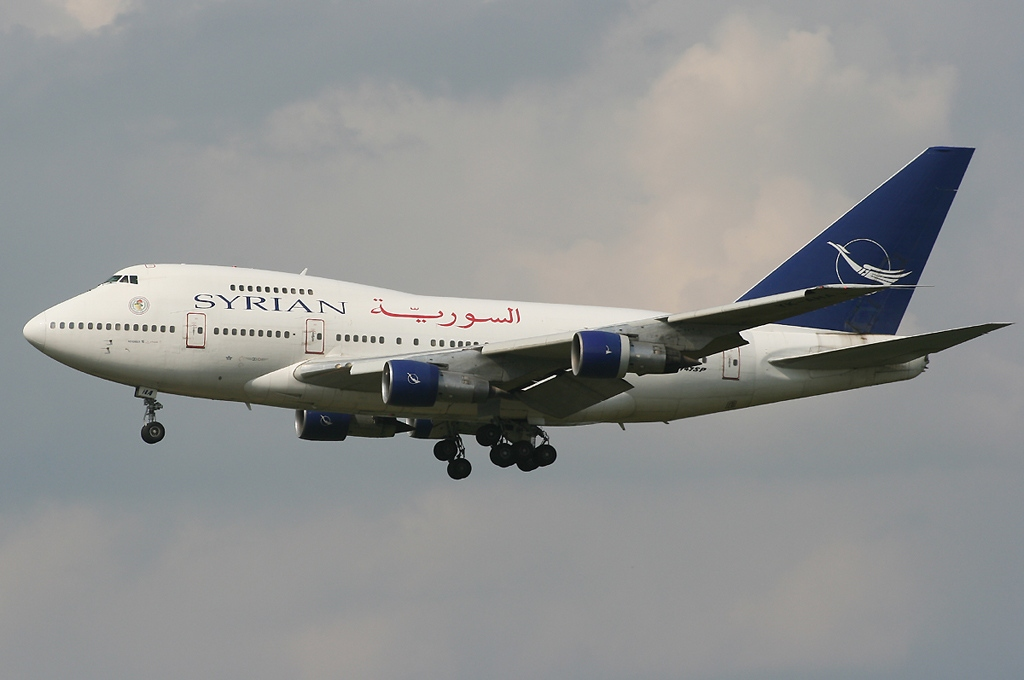
- A Boeing 747SP of Syrian Air in 2007

General information
- Type: Wide-body jet airliner
- National origin: United States
- Manufacturer: Boeing Airplane Company
- Status: Two in service with Pratt & Whitney Canada
- Primary users: Pan Am (historical): United Airlines (historical); South African Airways (historical); Iran Air (historical)
- Number built: 45

History
- Manufactured: 1976–1982, 1987–1989
- Introduction date: April 25, 1976 with Pan Am
- First flight: July 4, 1975
- Developed from: Boeing 747-100
- Variant: SOFIA

The Boeing 747SP (for Special Performance) is a shortened version of the Boeing 747 wide-body airliner, designed for a longer range. It is the highest flying subsonic passenger airliner, with a service ceiling of 45,100 feet (13,700 m). Built to meet a requirement for a long range and smaller aircraft to compete with the McDonnell Douglas DC-10 and Lockheed L-1011 TriStar tri-jet wide-bodies, the aircraft introduced in 1971/1972. Pan Am requested a 747-100 derivative to fly between New York and the Middle East, a request also shared by Iran Air, and the first order came from Pan Am in 1973.

The variant first flew on July 4, 1975, was approved by the Federal Aviation Administration on February 4, 1976, and entered service that year with Pan Am.

The SP is 184 feet 9 inches (56.31 m) in length, 47 feet (14 m) shorter than the original 747 variants. Its main deck doors are reduced to four on each side to suit its lower capacity. The vertical and horizontal tailplanes are larger and its wing flaps have been simplified. With a 700,000-pound (320 t; 320,000 kg) maximum take-off weight, it can fly 276 passengers in three classes over 5,830 nautical miles [nmi] (10,800 km; 6,710 mi). One 747SP was modified into the Stratospheric Observatory for Infrared Astronomy (SOFIA). The last example was delivered in 1987; some were converted to transports of heads of state. Sales did not meet the expected 200, with only 45 produced.

== Development ==
Pan American World Airways requested a 747 variant capable of carrying a full payload non-stop on its longest route between New York and Tehran which resulted in the development of the 747SP Joined with Pan Am's request was Iran Air; their joint interest was for a high-capacity airliner capable of covering Pan Am's New York–Middle Eastern routes and Iran Air's planned New York-Tehran route (New York to Tehran was the longest non-stop commercial flight in the world for a short time). The aircraft was launched with Pan Am's first order in 1973, and the first example was delivered in 1976.

A shorter derivative of the 747-100, the SP was developed to target two market requirements. The first was a need to compete with the DC-10 and L-1011 while maintaining commonality with the 747, which in its standard form was too large for many routes. Until the arrival of the 767, Boeing lacked a mid-sized wide-body to compete in this segment. The second market requirement was an aircraft suitable for the ultra-long-range routes emerging in the mid-1970s following the joint request. These routes needed not only longer range but also higher cruising speeds. Boeing could not afford to develop an all-new design, instead opting to shorten the 747 and optimize it for speed and range, at the expense of capacity.

Originally designated 747SB for "short body", it was later nicknamed "Sutter's balloon" by employees after 747 chief engineer Joe Sutter. Boeing later changed the production designation to 747SP for "special performance", reflecting the aircraft's greater range and higher cruising speed. Production of the 747SP originally ran from 1976 to 1983. However, a VIP order for UAE's Abu Dhabi Amiri Flight led Boeing to produce one last SP in 1987. Pan Am was the launch customer for the 747SP, taking the first delivery, Clipper Freedom, on March 5, 1976. Pan Am then made the first flight of the 747SP on April 25, 1976, making a nonstop flight from New York to Tokyo.

The 747SP was the longest-range airliner available until the 747-400 entered service in 1989. Despite its technical achievements, the SP never sold as well as Boeing hoped. Increased fuel prices in the mid-1970s to early 1980s, the SP's heavy wings, high cost, and reduced capacity, and the increased ranges of forthcoming airliners were some of the many factors that contributed to its low sales. Only 45 were built. However, some of the engineering work on the 747SP was reused with the development of the 747-300. In the 747SP, the upper deck begins over the section of fuselage that contains the wing box, not ahead of the wing box (as is the case with the 747-100 and 747-200). This same design was used in the 747-300 and newer 747-400, resulting in a stretched upper deck. A proposed variant called Boeing 747 ASB, which based on 747SP's design with advanced improvements found on 747-400, includes new glass cockpit, new engine options, and winglets, was announced in 1986 but cancelled later year due to low interest from airlines and in favor of Boeing 777.

== Design ==
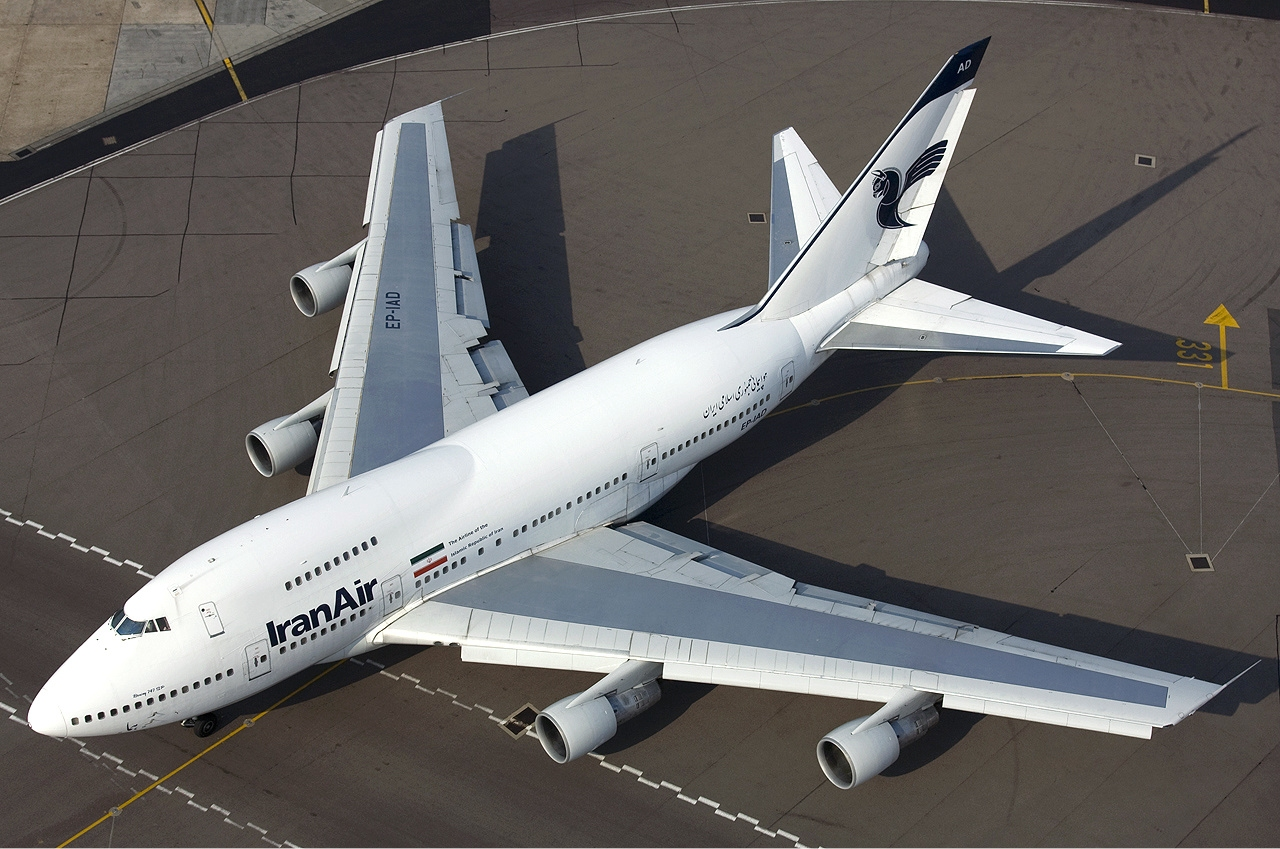
Iran Air 747SP from above, 47 ft (14 m) shorter than the 747, with four exit doors per side

Apart from having a significantly shorter fuselage and one fewer cabin door per side, the 747SP differs from other 747 variants in having simplified flaps and a taller vertical tail to counteract the decrease in yaw moment-arm from the shortened fuselage. The 747SP uses single-piece flaps on the trailing edges, rather than the smaller triple-slotted flaps of standard 747s.

The SP could accommodate 230 passengers in a 3-class cabin or 331 (303 economy, 28 business) in a 2-class cabin, and a maximum of 400 passengers in one class.

== Variants ==
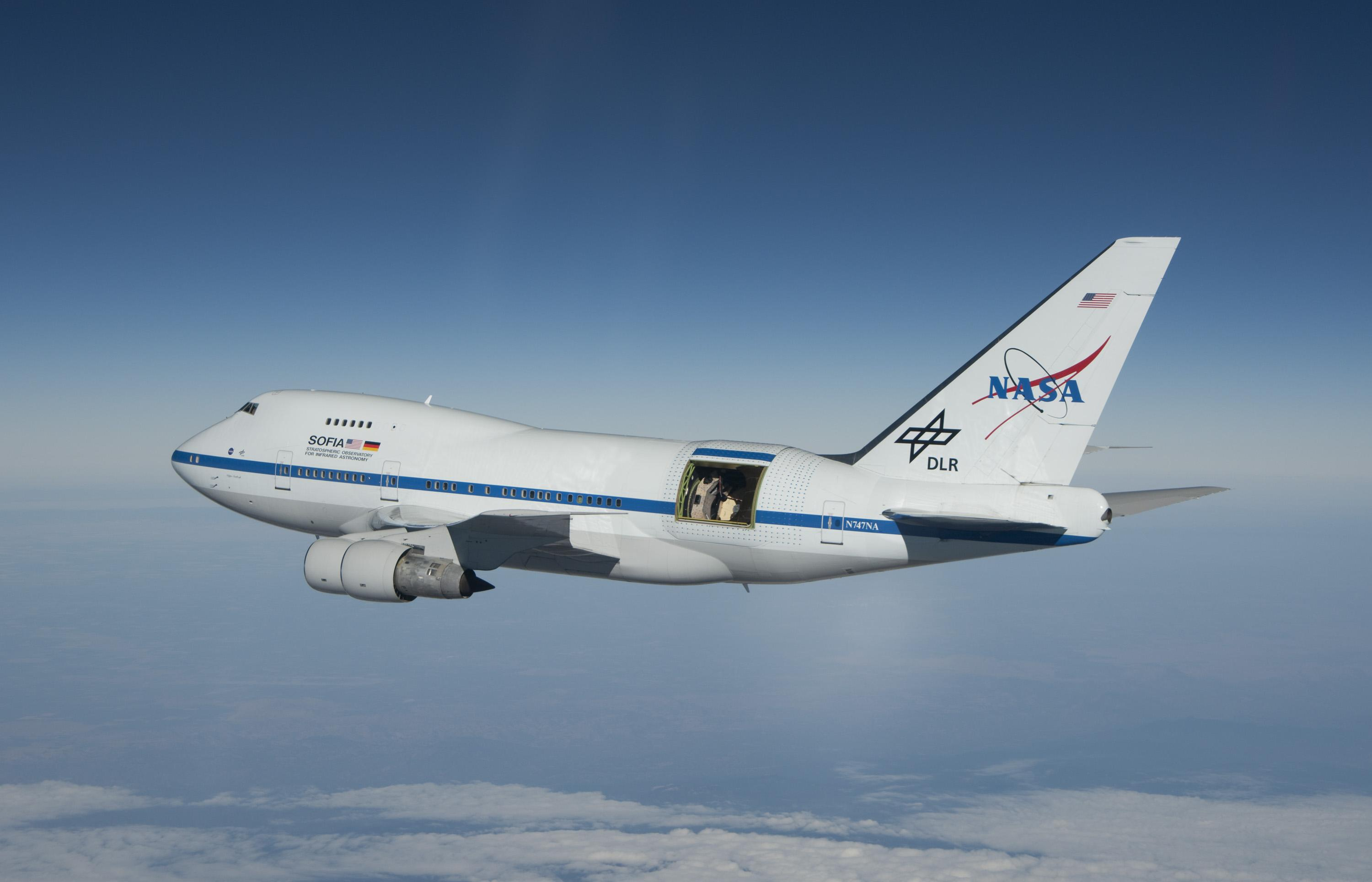
The 747SP used as the NASA Stratospheric Observatory for Infrared Astronomy

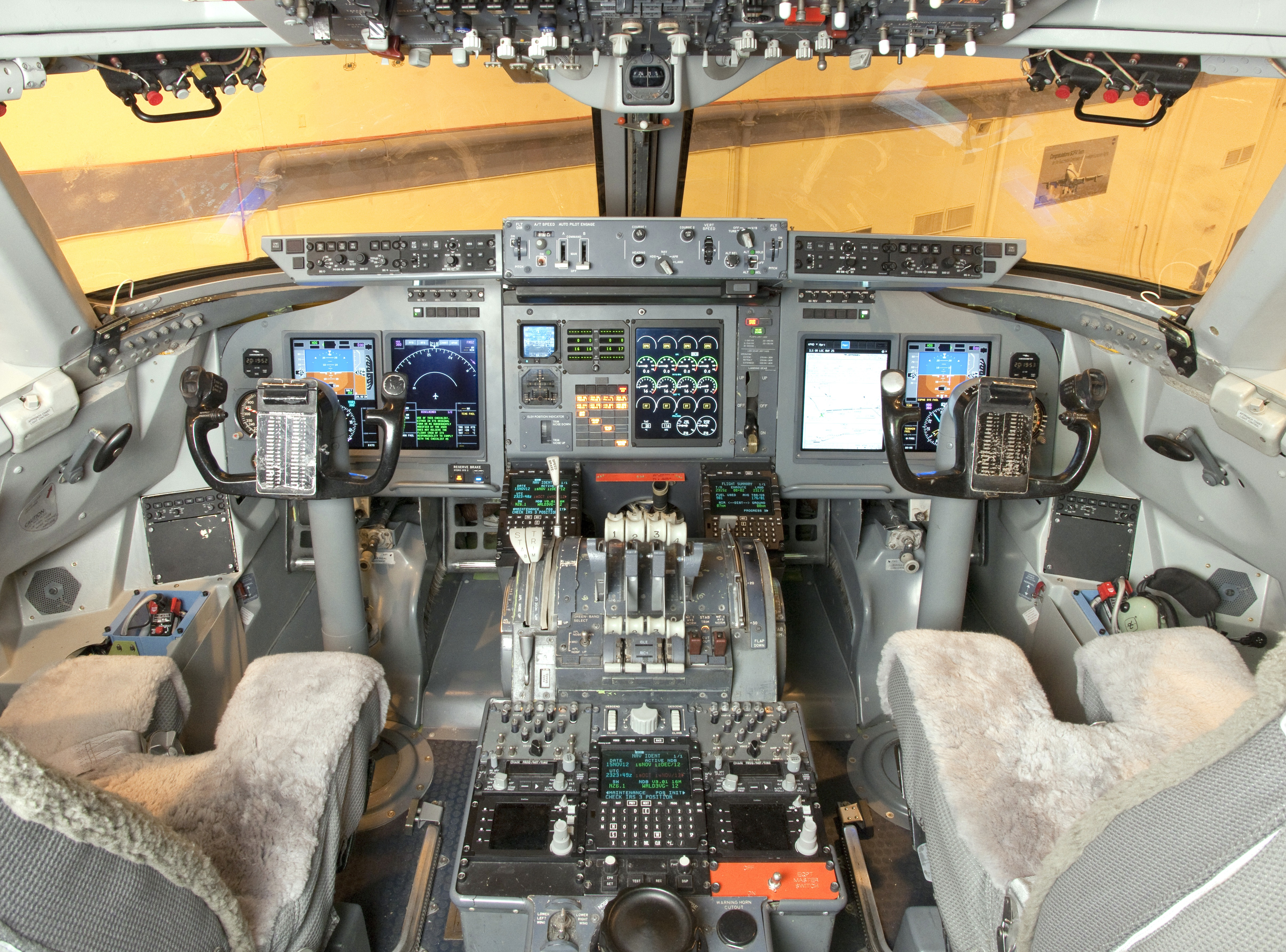
NASA Stratospheric Observatory for Infrared Astronomy Boeing 747SP flight deck

From 2007 until 2022, a specially modified 747SP was used as the Stratospheric Observatory for Infrared Astronomy (SOFIA) astronomical observatory, operated jointly by NASA and Germany's DLR. A former Pan Am and United Airlines aircraft acquired in 1997, its airframe was modified to carry a 2.5-meter-diameter reflecting telescope to high altitude, above 99.9% of the light-absorbing water vapor in the atmosphere. The telescope and its detectors covered a wide wavelength range from the near infrared to the sub-millimeter region; no window material is transparent over this whole range, so the observations were made through a 13 feet (4.0 m) square hole in the port upper quarter of the rear fuselage, aft of a new pressure bulkhead. A sliding door covered the aperture when the telescope was not in use. Astronomers took data and controlled the instrument from within the normally pressurized cabin. Originally delivered to Pan Am and named "Clipper Lindbergh", the name was displayed in script on the port side of the aircraft.

In September 2022, SOFIA ceased operations after the conclusion of its final mission. The retirement was made both on the grounds of cost and suitability for the requirements of the decade to come. The aircraft was later flown to the Pima Air & Space Museum in Tucson, Arizona, to be put on public display.

== Operators ==
=== Deliveries ===
Forty-five 747SP aircraft were built between 1974 and 1987. The production line was ended in 1982 but reopened in 1987 to fulfill an order for the Abu Dhabi Amiri Flight.

Type	1976	1977	1978	1979	1980	1981	1982	1983	1984	1985	1986	1987	1988	1989	Total
747-SP	14	4	2	5	9	6	4	—N/a	—N/a	—N/a	—N/a	—N/a	—N/a	1	45

=== Status ===
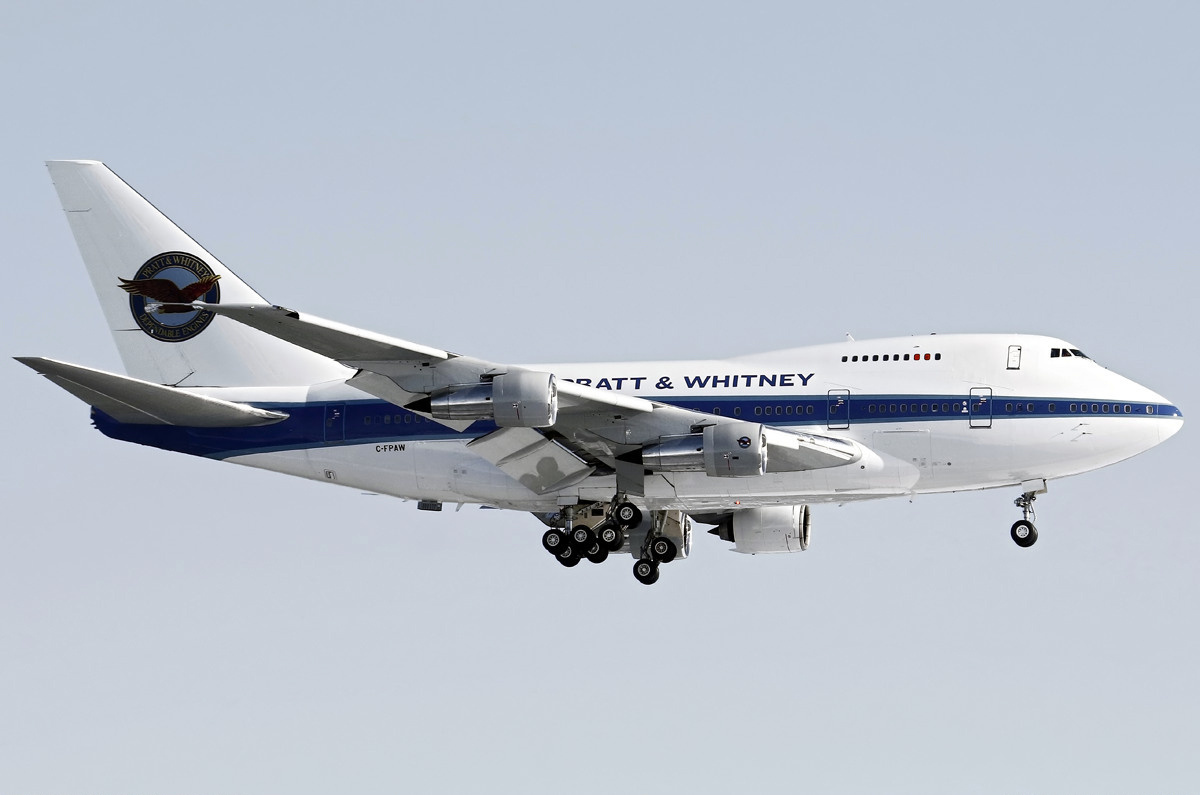
Pratt & Whitney engine testbed testing the Pratt & Whitney PW1000G engine

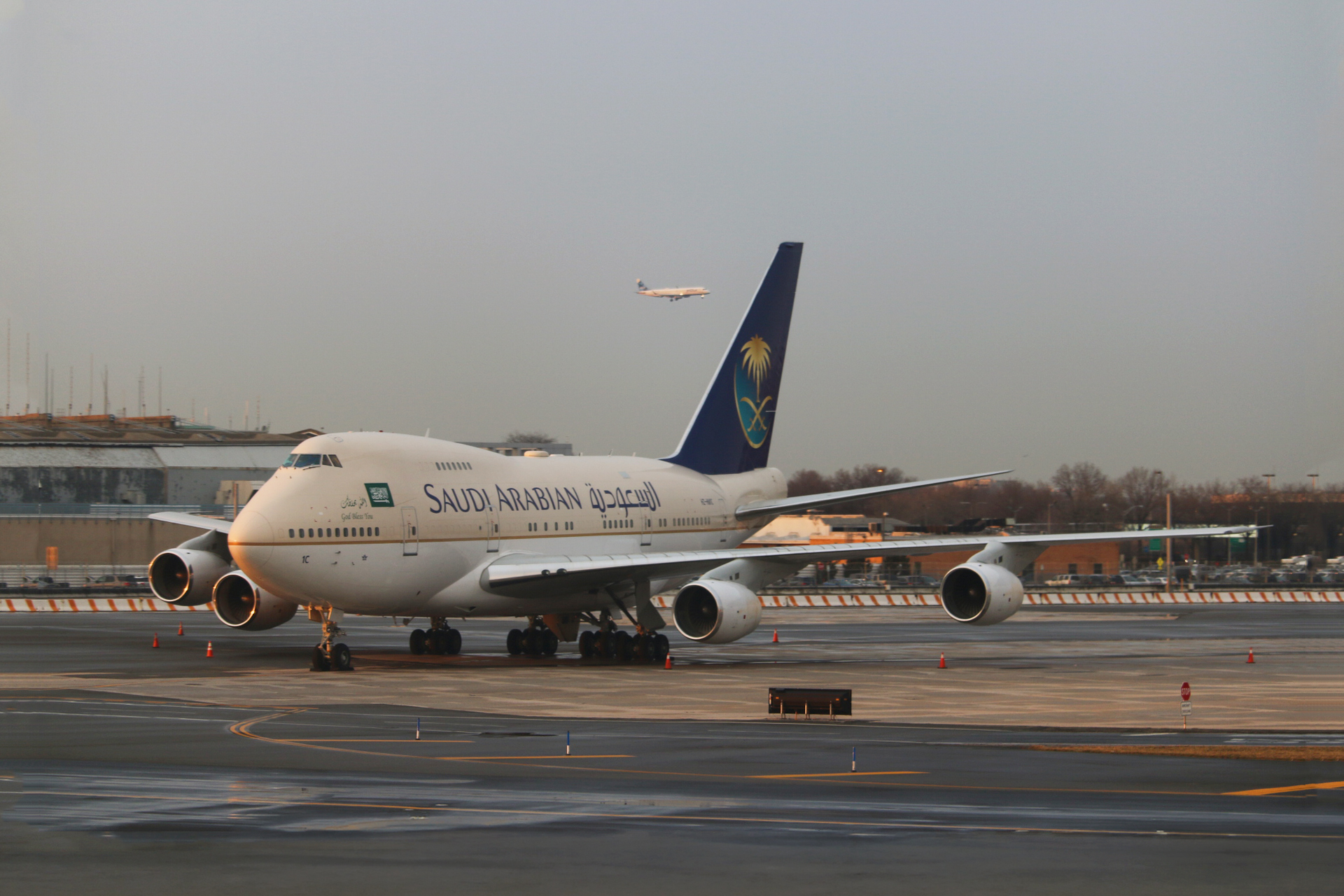
747SP for the Saudi Arabian royal family in 2017

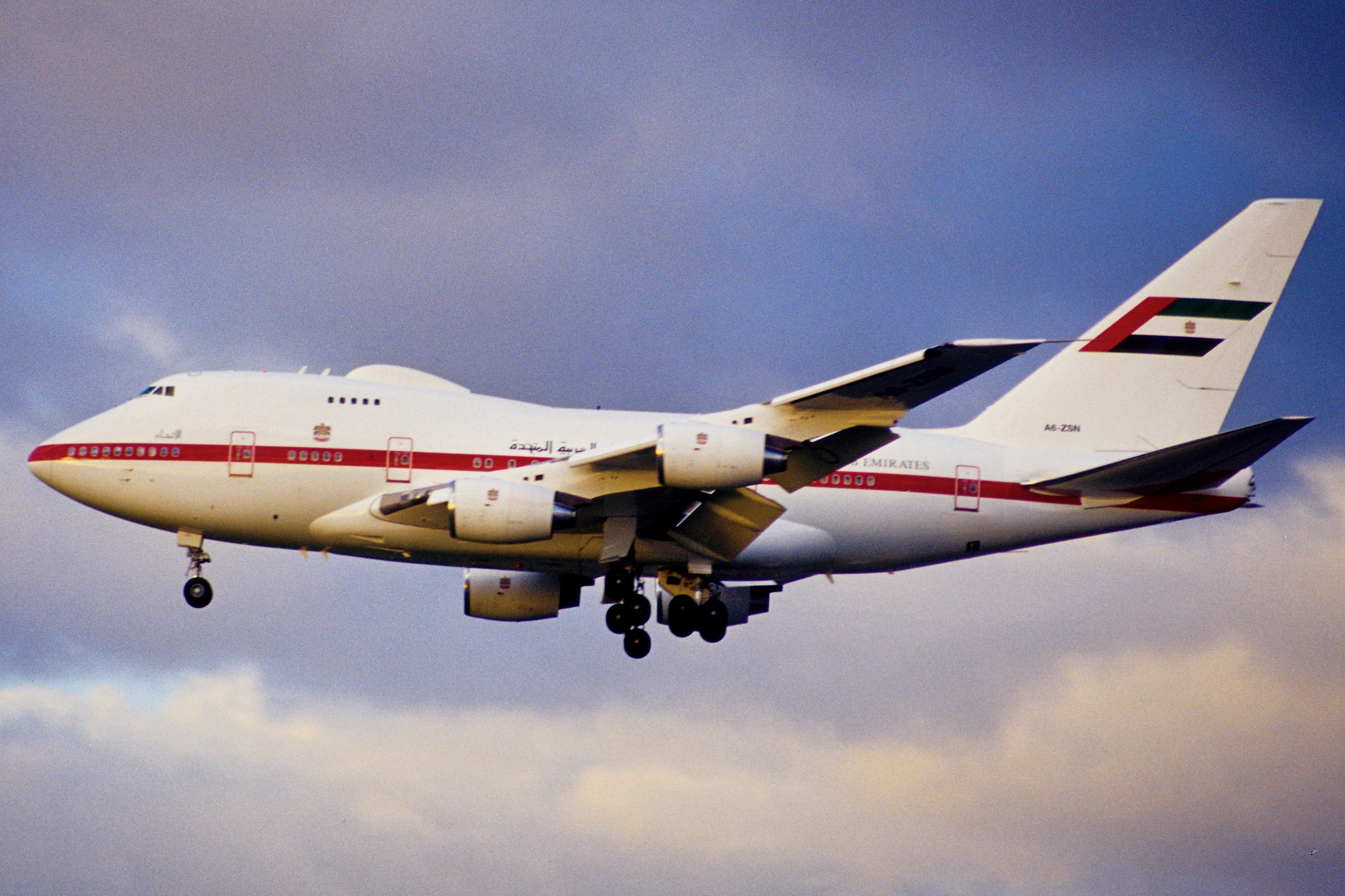
The last 747SP, built in 1987 for Abu Dhabi Amiri Flight

As of August 2026, one Boeing 747SP remains in active service, operating as a testbed aircraft for engine manufacturer Pratt & Whitney Canada. Eighteen more aircraft are stored or otherwise preserved. The remaining aircraft were either scrapped, otherwise destroyed, or abandoned. In 2016, the last 747SP in commercial service flew from Tehran to Mumbai before being withdrawn from service after 40 years by Iran Air. In 2020, the last aircraft in governmental use was stored by the Royal Flight of Oman.

=== Former operators ===
This list also includes organizations that used the aircraft temporarily, besides main operators.

Africa

- Cameroon
  - Cameroon Airlines
- Democratic Republic of the Congo
  - Kinshasa Airways
- Malawi
  - Air Malawi
- Morocco
  - Royal Air Maroc
- Mauritius
  - Air Mauritius
- Mozambique
  - LAM Mozambique Airlines
- Namibia
  - Air Namibia
- Uganda
  - Alliance Air
- South Africa
  - Avia Airlines
  - South African Airways
  - Trek Airways

America

- Argentina
  - Aerolíneas Argentinas
- United States
  - American Airlines
  - Braniff International Airways
  - Global Peace Ambassadors
  - Las Vegas Sands
  - Pan Am
  - Trans World Airlines
  - United Airlines

Asia

- Bahrain
  - Bahrain Royal Flight
- Brunei
  - His Majesty The Sultan's Flight
- Iran
  - Iran Air
- Iraq
  - Iraqi Airways
- Kazakhstan
  - Kazakhstan Airlines
- Lebanon
  - Middle East Airlines
- Oman
  - Royal Flight of Oman
- China
  - Air China
  - Civil Aviation Administration of China
- Qatar
  - Qatar Airways
  - Qatar Amiri Flight
- Republic of China
  - China Airlines
  - Mandarin Airlines
- Republic of Korea
  - Korean Air
- Saudi Arabia
  - Saudia
- Syria
  - Syrian Air
- Tajikistan
  - Tajik Air
- United Arab Emirates
  - Abu Dhabi Amiri Flight
  - Dubai Royal Air Wing
- Yemen
  - Yemenia

Europe

- France
  - Corsair International
  - Union de Transports Aériens
- Iceland
  - Air Atlanta Icelandic
- Luxembourg
  - Luxair

Oceania

- Australia
  - Australia Asia Airlines
  - Qantas

== Records ==
There were three significant commercial around-the-world record-setting flights flown by 747SP: two operated by Pan Am and the other operated by United Airlines with the aircraft being "loaned" to Friendship Foundation, in order to raise money for the foundation. Those flights are:

- Liberty Bell Express—Flown from New York/JFK May 1–3, 1976. 2 stopovers at Palam Airport, New Delhi and Tokyo-Haneda Airport. The round-the-world flight took 46 hours and 26 minutes over 23,137 miles.
- Pan Am Flight 50—to celebrate the 50th anniversary of Pan Am. Flown October 28–30, 1977 from San Francisco, with a time duration of 54 hours, 7 minutes, 12 seconds. 3 stopovers at Heathrow Airport, Cape Town and Auckland. Flight 50 flew over both the North Pole and the South Pole.
- Friendship One—Flown January 29–31, 1988 from Seattle, to raise funds for Friendship Foundation. Two stopovers were made, at Athens and Taipei. The record lasted less than a month, as it was beaten by a Gulfstream IV. The round-the-world flight took 35 hours and 54 minutes over 23,125 miles.
- In 1976 a Boeing 747SP (ZS-SPA) of South African Airways was flown non-stop from the Boeing Company factory in Seattle to Cape Town during its delivery flight. This was a world record for an un-refueled commercial aircraft, this record was held for over a decade.

== Incidents and accidents ==
- On February 19, 1985, China Airlines Flight 006, a 747SP-09 (aircraft registration N4522V) with 274 passengers and crew on a flight from Chiang Kai-shek Airport to Los Angeles suffered an inflight failure on engine number four. While the flight crew attempted to restore power the aircraft rolled to the right and started a steep descent from the cruising altitude of 41,000 feet, pulling 4.8 G and 5.1 G on two occasions. The captain managed to stabilize the aircraft at 9,500 feet and the aircraft diverted to San Francisco which was 550 km (297.0 nmi; 341.8 mi) away. Two passengers were injured and the aircraft suffered major structural damage.
- On October 5, 1998, a South African Airways Boeing 747SP-44 (ZS-SPF) operated by LAM Mozambique Airlines suffered an engine failure shortly after take-off from Maputo International Airport, Mozambique. The no. 3 engine suffered an uncontained failure – flying debris caused damage to the no. 4 engine and the wing. A fire broke out that couldn't be extinguished immediately, forcing an emergency landing. All 66 people on board survived. As a result, the aircraft was withdrawn from service and scrapped.
- On January 15, 2004, Iran Air Flight 800, a 747SP-86 (aircraft registration EP-IAC), faced hydraulic malfunction shortly after takeoff from Beijing Capital International Airport, the aircraft made an emergency landing, but the front landing gear collapsed. All people on board survived with no injuries.
- During the Yemeni Civil War, a 747SP owned by the President of Yemen, 7O-YMN, was struck by gunfire on March 19, 2015. Subsequent photographs show that the aircraft was then completely destroyed by fire afterward.
- On August 27, 2020, a Las Vegas Sands Boeing 747SP-21 (VQ-BMS) was damaged beyond repair during Hurricane Laura while undergoing maintenance. The right-hand wing fractured and the wing of another aircraft, believed to be BBJ N836BA, cut through the forward fuselage.

== Preserved aircraft ==
- An ex-South African Airways 747SP nicknamed "Maluti" is on static display at Rand Airport in South Africa, where it is maintained by the South African Airways Museum Society.
- 21648/367 - 747SP-21 registration N7477S (formerly N148UA, N539PA, VR-BAT and VP-BAT) — originally delivered to Pan Am as Clipper Liberty Bell and later operated by United Airlines and the Qatar Amiri Flight VVIP fleet, it was acquired by CSDS Aircraft Sales and Leasing in 2018 for long-term preservation.
- NASA 747SP N747NA, SOFIA (ex-Pan Am Clipper Lindbergh) is preserved at the Pima Air & Space Museum in Tucson, Arizona.

== Specifications (Boeing 747SP with JT9D-7J engines) ==
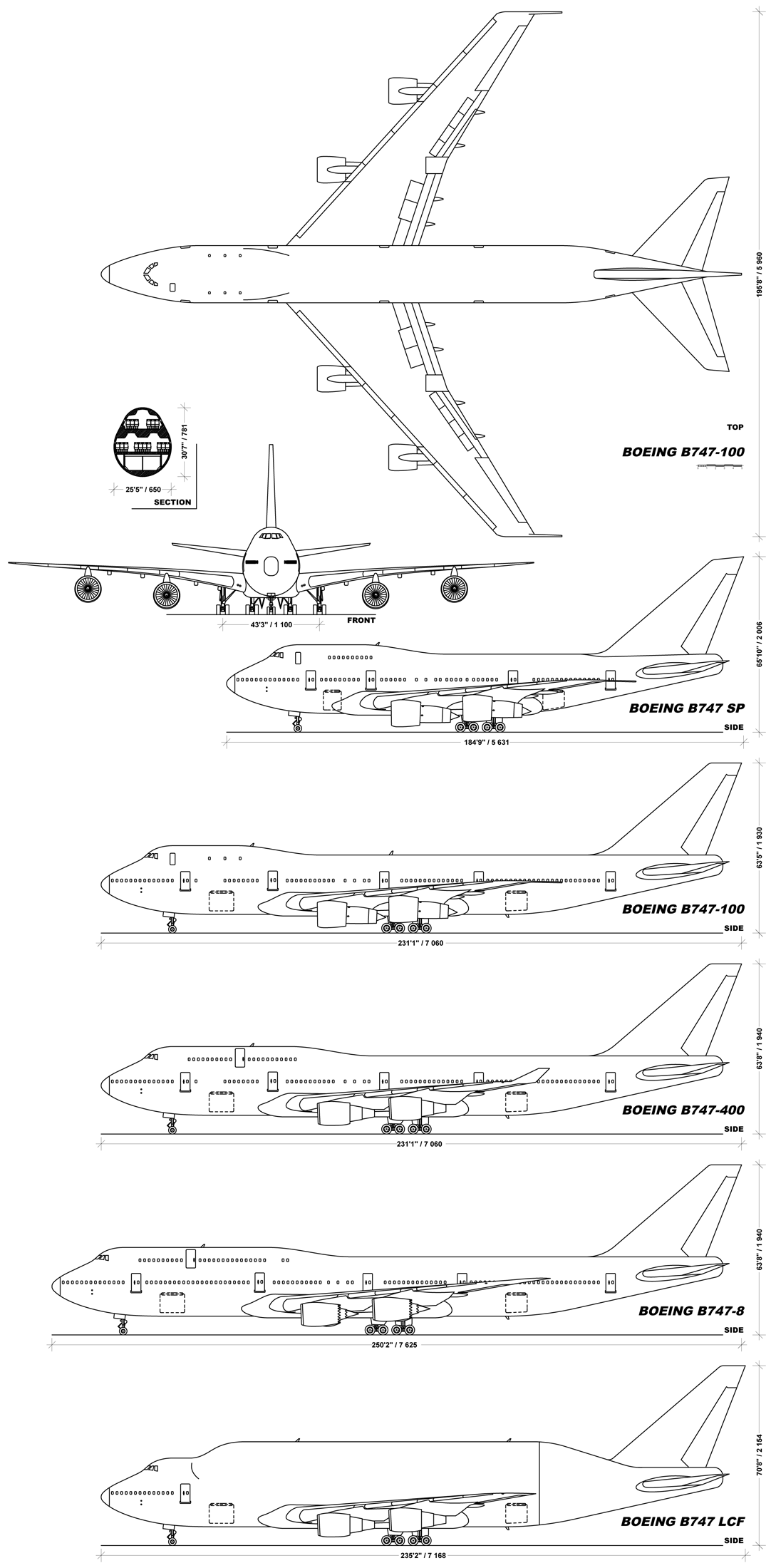
747-100 top view, cross-section, front view, 747 side views: 747SP, -100, -400, -8I, and LCF

Data from

General characteristics

- Crew: 3
- Capacity: 331 or 343 passengers (three-class), 3,900 cu ft (110 m^{3}) of cargo, 83,730 lb (37,970 kg) total payload
- Length: 183 ft 3 in (55.85 m)
- Wingspan: 195 ft 8 in (59.64 m)
- Width: 21 ft 4 in (6.50 m) cabin width
- Height: 65 ft 10 in (20.06 m) with landing gear extended
- Empty weight: 337,100 lb (152,906 kg)
- Max takeoff weight: 700,000 lb (317,515 kg)
- Fuel capacity: 50,359 U.S. gal (190,630 L)
- Max landing weight: 450,000 lb (200,000 kg)
- Max zero fuel weight: 410,000 lb (190,000 kg)
- Powerplant: 4 × Pratt & Whitney JT9D-7J high bypass turbofan, 50,000 lbf (220 kN) thrust each

Performance

- Maximum speed: Mach 0.92
- Range: 6,710 mi (10,800 km, 5,830 nmi)
- Service ceiling: 45,100 ft (13,700 m)
- Takeoff distance: 9,250 ft (2,820 m) at max takeoff weight
- Landing distance: 5,250 ft (1,600 m) at max landing weight

== See also ==
Related development

- Boeing 747
- Boeing 747-400
- Boeing 747-8

Aircraft of comparable role, configuration, and era

- Ilyushin Il-86
- Lockheed L-1011 TriStar
- McDonnell Douglas DC-10

Related lists

- List of Boeing 747 operators
- List of civil aircraft
