= Flying Lions Aerobatic Team =

South African formation aerobatic team

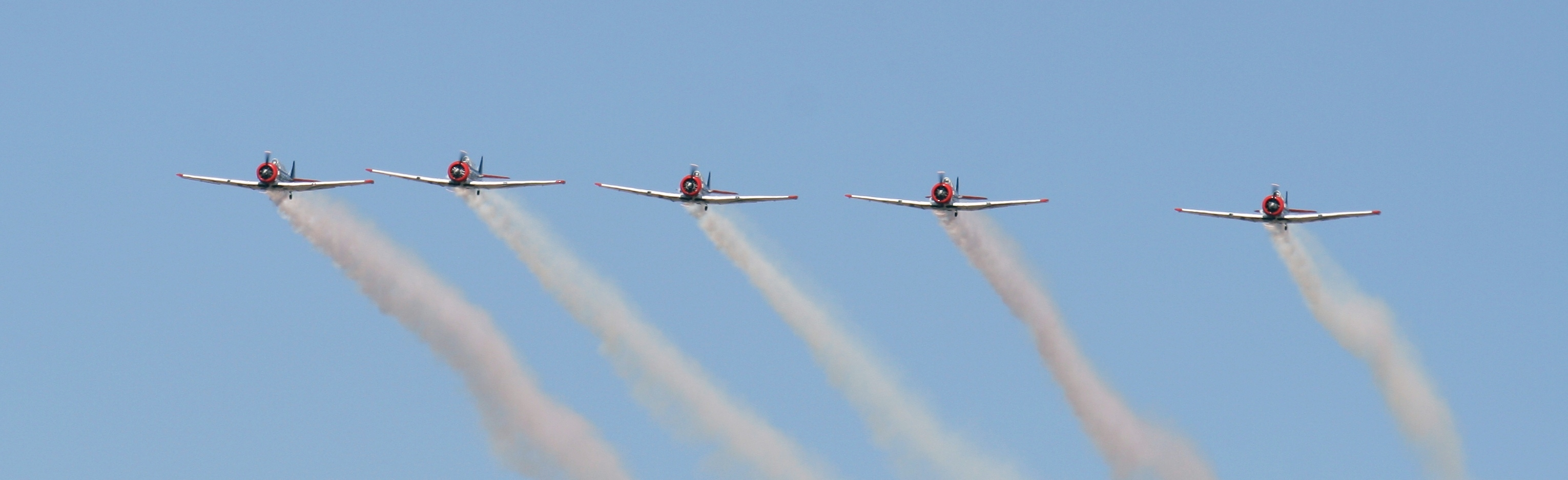
- All five Harvards of the Flying Lions in formation at the 2011 Rand Airport air show
- Active: 1999–present
- Country: South Africa
- Type: Civilian aerobatic display team
- Garrison/HQ: Johannesburg, South Africa
- Website: http://www.flyinglions.co.za/

Aircraft flown
- Trainer: North American Harvard

The Flying Lions Aerobatic Team is a South African formation aerobatic team. They fly a four-ship aerobatic display using North American Harvard aircraft. The team operates five aircraft but only uses four in their display, leaving the fifth to be used as a backup. The Flying Lions have been in operation since 1999 when Arnie Meneghelli acquired the Harvard aircraft that the South African Air Force was decommissioning. The Flying Lions participate at many major airshows around South Africa during the airshow season.

== The pilots ==
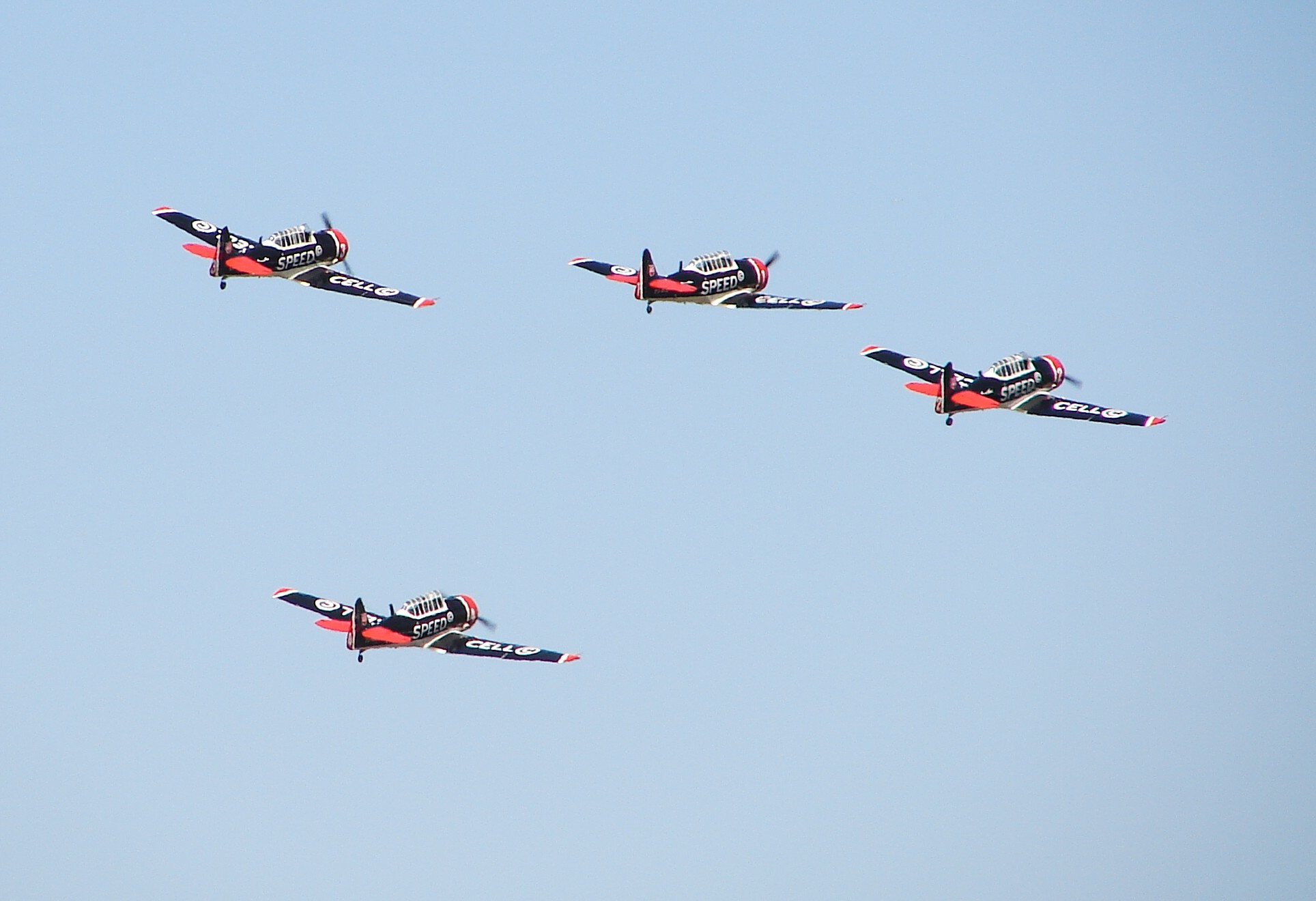
The Flying Lions form up to begin their four-ship display.

=== Scully Levin ===
Scully Levin is the team leader of the Flying Lions Aerobatic Team. He was born in Polokwane in 1946. He joined South African Airways in 1971 at the age of 25 and flew one of their aircraft in a three-ship formation at the inauguration of President Thabo Mbeki. After reaching SAA's mandatory retirement age, he joined Mango Airlines. He has over 27,000 hours of flight experience. Levin is also the leader of the Gabriel Wings Aerobatic Team.

=== Arnie Meneghelli ===
Arnie Meneghelli is the number 2 pilot and the owner of the Flying Lions Aerobatic Team. He has flown many aircraft types including Extras, Pitts and Zlins. Meneghelli also flies as the right wingman of the Gabriel Wings Aerobatic Team.

=== Ellis Levin ===
Ellis Levin is the son of Scully Levin and the number 3 pilot of the Flying Lions Aerobatic Team. He is currently flying Airbus aircraft with South African Airways. He also flies as a soloist for the Gabriel Wings Aerobatic Team and is the wingman of the Mazda Zoom Zoom aerobatic team.

=== Sean Thackwray ===
Sean Thackwray is the number 4 pilot of the Flying Lions Aerobatic Team. He was born into a military family and flew Impalas, Mirages and Cheetahs in the South African Air Force. In the past he flew for Cathay Pacific Airlines and currently flies with South African Airways. He is also the left wingman of the Gabriel Wings Aerobatic Team.

=== Steward Lithgow ===
Steward Lithgow is the number 5 pilot of the Flying Lions Aerobatic Team. He was part of the team that landed an SAA Boeing 747 at Rand Airport and he was one of the pilots that participated in the 2004 presidential flypast.

== Sponsors ==
The Team is currently sponsored by Eqstra Holdings Ltd. Past sponsors include: Academy Brushware, Air BP, Castrol, Cell C, Nissan, and Peugeot.

== 2006 water-skiing stunt ==
In 2006, the Flying Lions Aerobatic Team performed a water-skiing stunt with their aircraft in the Klipdrift Dam near Johannesburg. The pilots flew low over the dam and reduced their altitude until their aircraft's wheels were about four millimetres into the water, the deepest they could safely go. The stunt was approved by the South African Civil Aviation Authority. The pilots who took part in this stunt were Scully Levin, Arnie Meneghelli, Stewart Lithgow and Ellis Levin. The stunt was photographed by photographer, Frans Dely.
