= Kinshasa Airways =

Cargo airline based in the United Arab Emirates

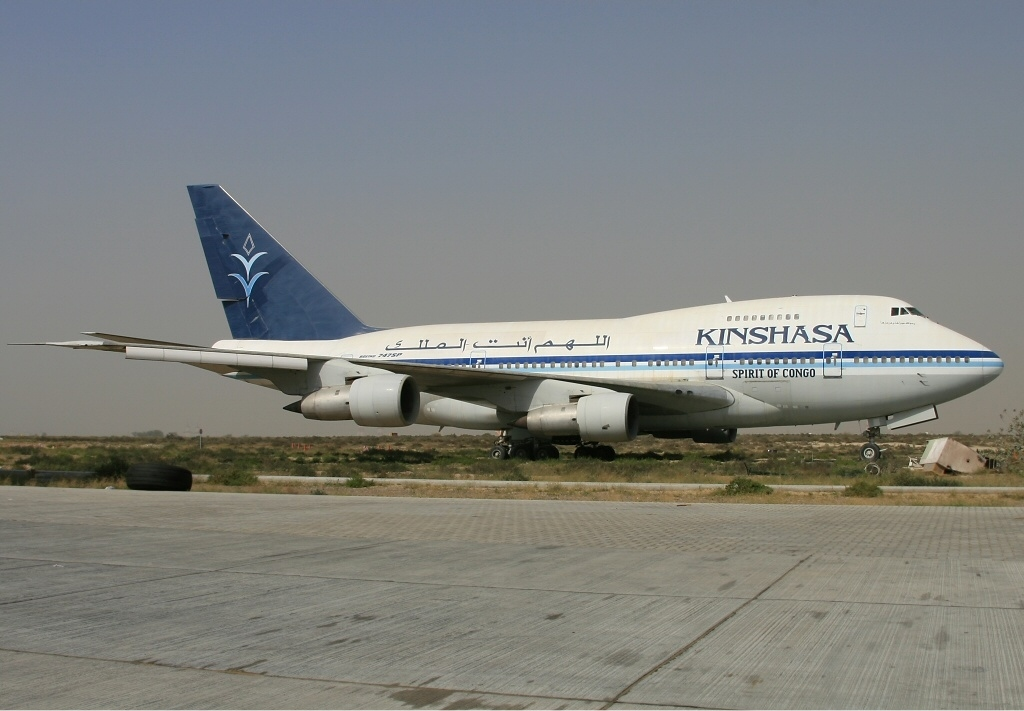
IATA	ICAO	Call sign
-	KNS	KINSHASA AIRWAYS
- Founded: 2002
- Ceased operations: 2010
- Hubs: Sharjah International Airport
- Focus cities: Kinshasa, Lubumbashi
- Fleet size: 4
- Headquarters: Democratic Republic of the Congo
- Key people: Willy Mubela (owner) Max Allan Mubela (CEO)

Kinshasa Airways was a cargo airline based in Sharjah, United Arab Emirates. It was established in 2002 by Willy Mubela Kumwimba and operated cargo services from the Democratic Republic of the Congo and the Middle East.

== Fleet ==
At August 2010 the Kinshasa Airways fleet included:

- 1 Boeing 707-320B
- 1 Boeing 727-200
- 1 Boeing 747SP (stored in Sharjah)
- 2 Douglas DC-8-55JT

=== Previously operated ===
As of January 2005 the airline operated:

- 1 Boeing 707-320C
- 1 Tupolev Tu-154B-2
- 2 A.119 Koala

== See also ==
- Transport in the Democratic Republic of the Congo
