= Douglas DC-4 =

Four-engine propeller-driven airliner

DC-4
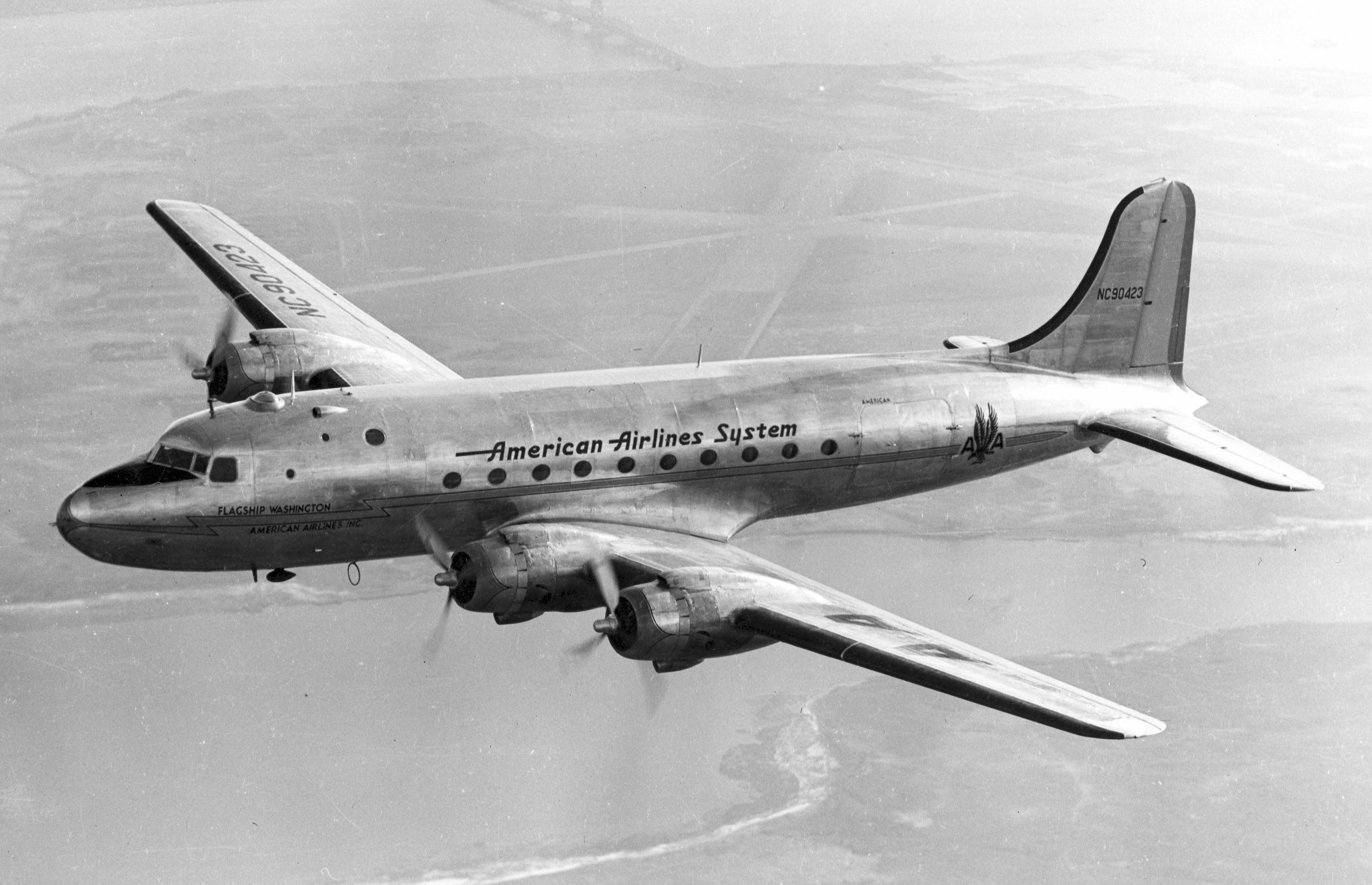

General information
- Type: Airliner/transport aircraft
- National origin: United States
- Manufacturer: Douglas Aircraft Company
- Status: In very limited use
- Primary users: South African Airways Museum Society United Airlines (historical); American Airlines (historical); Trans World Airlines (historical); Buffalo Airways (historical)
- Number built: 80 DC-4 and 1,163 C-54/R5D

History
- Manufactured: 1942 – August 1947
- Introduction date: 1942 with United Airlines
- First flight: 14 February 1942 (production series)
- Retired: 1991
- Variants: C-54 Skymaster; Canadair North Star
- Developed into: Aviation Traders ATL-98 Carvair; Douglas DC-6

The Douglas DC-4 is an American four-engined (piston), propeller-driven airliner developed by the Douglas Aircraft Company. Military versions of the plane, the C-54 and R5D, served during World War II, in the Berlin Airlift and into the 1960s. From 1945, many civil airlines operated the DC-4 worldwide.

== Design and development ==
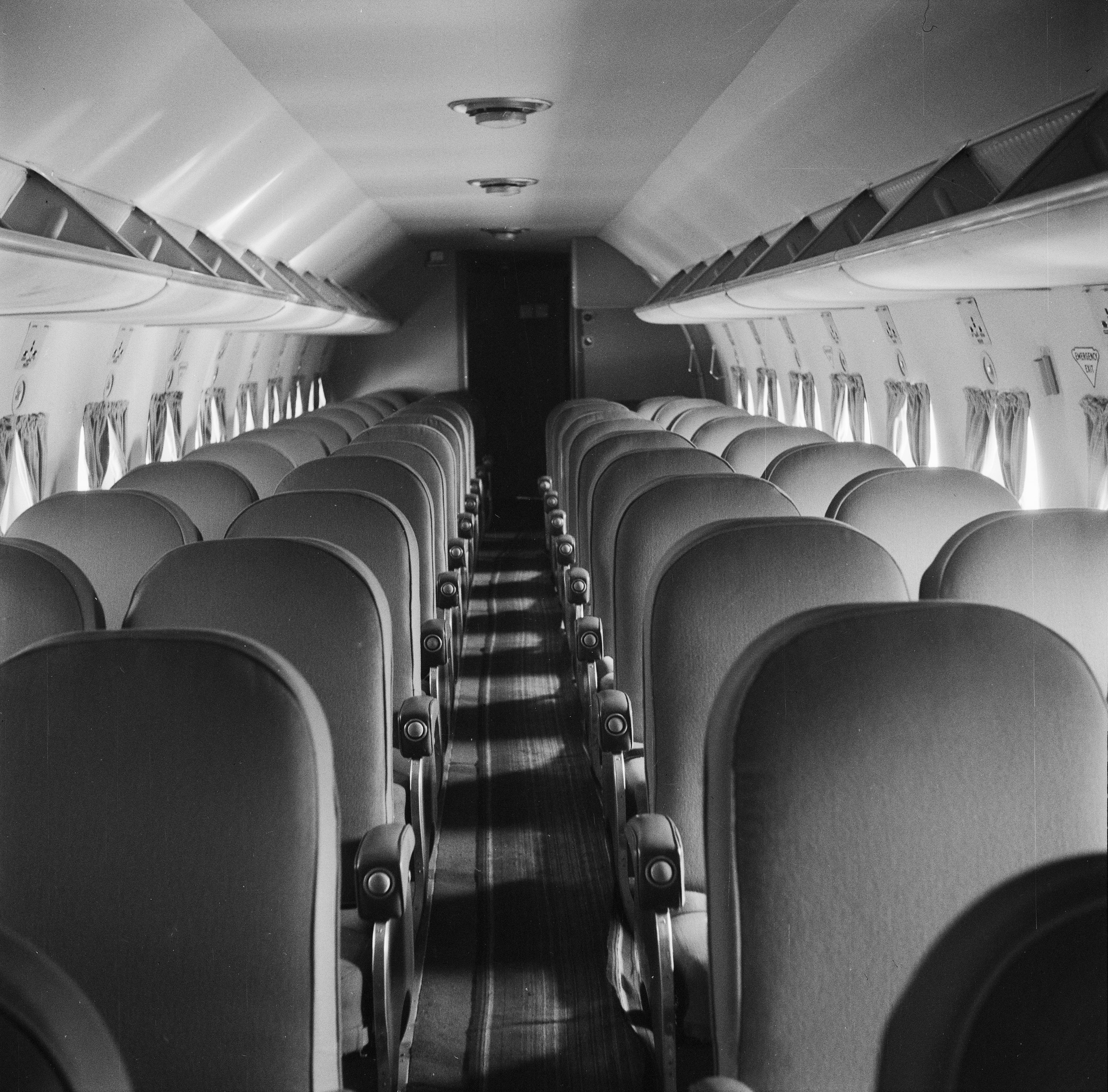
DC-4 cabin

The name "DC-4" had already been used for a prototype 52-seat precursor that first flew in 1935, but did not enter production and later became known as the DC-4E (to distinguish it from the DC-4 per se). The DC-4E had been rejected by airlines, following proving flights by United Airlines; it had become obvious that the design was too inefficient and unreliable to operate economically and partner airlines – United, American Airlines, Eastern, Pan American and TWA – recommended a lengthy list of changes. Douglas integrated the new requirements into an entirely new, smaller design, the DC-4A, with a simpler fuselage, Pratt & Whitney R-2000 Twin Wasp engines, and a single fin and rudder (rather than the tri-fin tail of the DC-4E). However, the tricycle landing gear and unpressurized cabins of the precursor were retained.

With the entry of the United States into World War II, in December 1941, the United States Army Air Forces took over the provisional orders for the airlines and allocated them the designation C-54 Skymaster. The first C-54 flew from Clover Field in Santa Monica, California, on 14 February 1942.

To meet military requirements, the first production aircraft had four additional auxiliary fuel tanks in the main cabin, which reduced the passenger seats to 26. The following batch of aircraft was the first built to military specifications, and was designated C-54A and built with a stronger floor and a cargo door with a hoist and winch. The first C-54A was delivered in February 1943. With the introduction of the C-54B in March 1944, the outer wings were changed to hold integral fuel tanks, allowing two of the cabin tanks to be removed; this allowed 49 seats (or 16 stretchers) to be fitted. The C-54C was a hybrid for Presidential use; it had a C-54A fuselage with four cabin fuel tanks and the C-54B wings with built-in tanks to achieve maximum range.

The most common variant was the C-54D, which entered service in August 1944, essentially a C-54B with more powerful R-2000-11 engines. With the C-54E the last two cabin fuel tanks were moved to the wings, which allowed more freight or 44 passenger seats.

In total, 1,163 C-54s (or R5D in US Navy service) were built for the United States military between 1942 and January 1946 and another 79 DC-4s were built after the war. A later variant, with more powerful Merlin engines allowing it to fly over 40% faster, was built in Canada as the Canadair North Star.

== Operational history ==
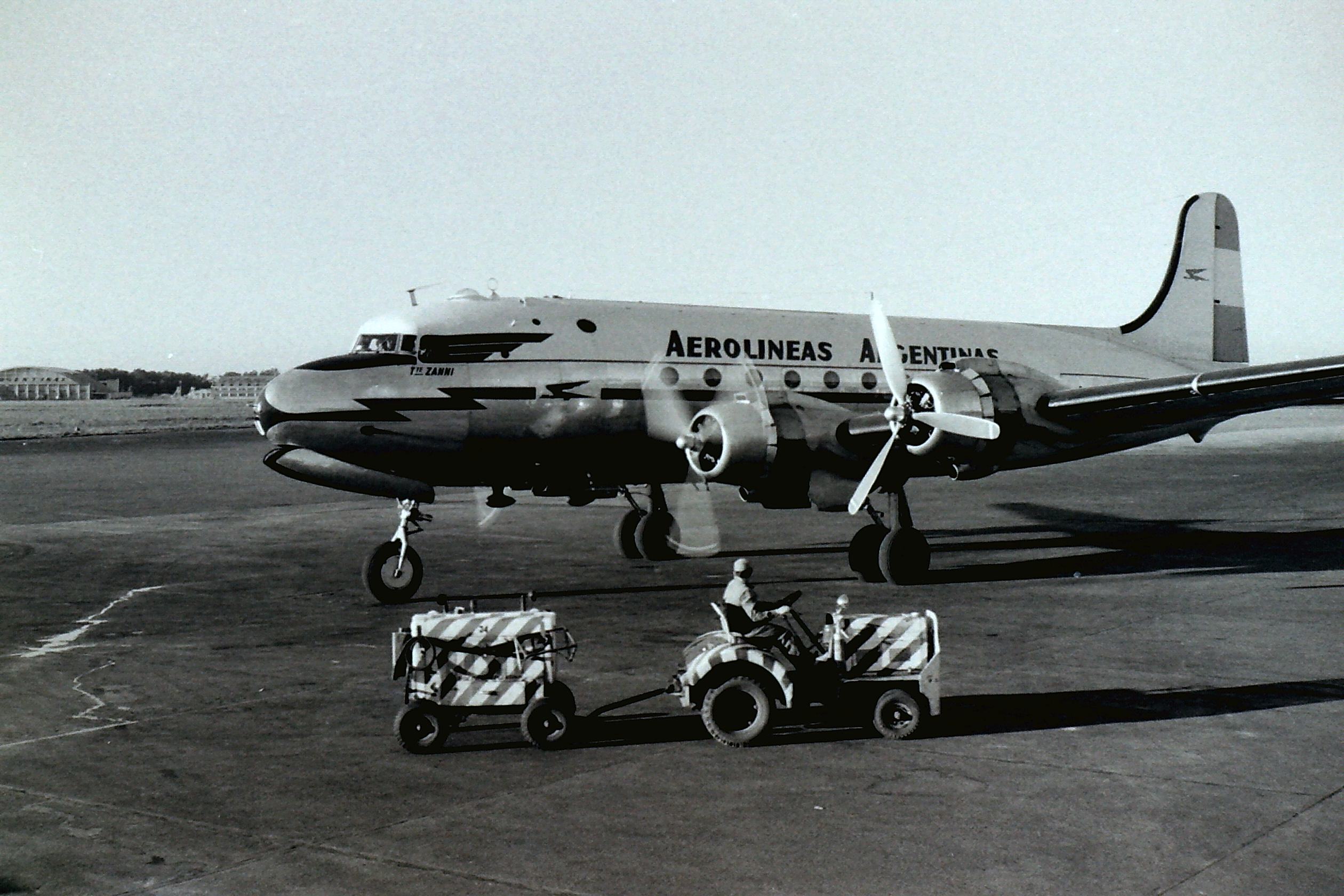
Aerolíneas Argentinas DC-4 starting engines at Buenos Aires international airport in 1958

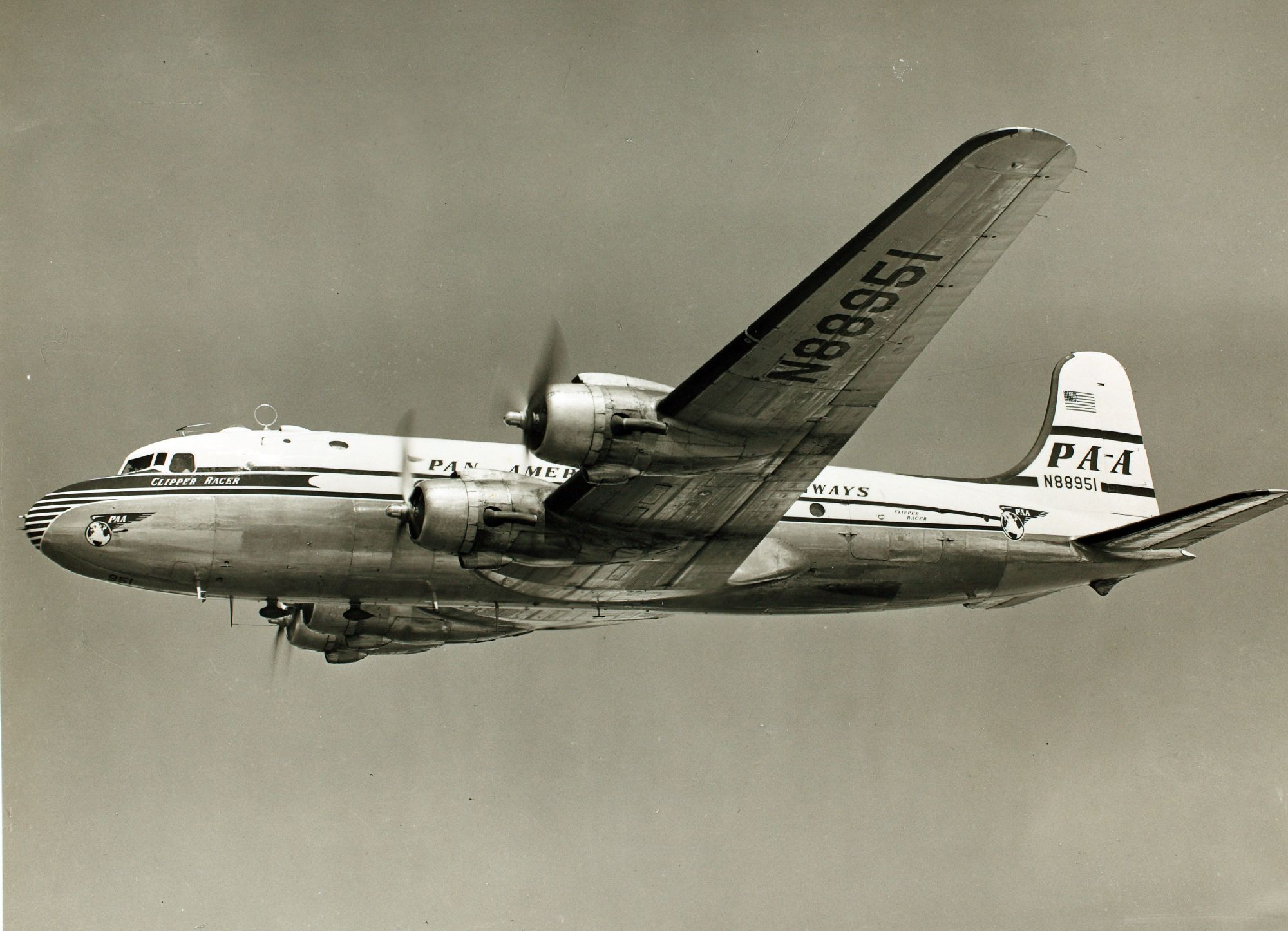
Pan American DC-4 in flight

The DC-4/C-54 proved to be a popular and reliable type, with 1,245 being built between May 1942 and August 1947, including 79 postwar DC-4s. Several remain in service as of 2022.

Douglas continued to develop the type during the war in preparation for a return to airline use when peace returned. Sales of new aircraft had to compete against 500 wartime ex-military C-54s and R5Ds which came onto the civilian market, many of which were converted to DC-4 standard by Douglas. DC-4s were a favorite of charter airlines such as Great Lakes Airlines, North American Airlines, Universal Airlines, and Transocean Air Lines. In the 1950s, Transocean (Oakland, California) was the largest civilian C-54/DC-4 operator.

Douglas produced 79 new-build DC-4s between January 1946 and August 9, 1947, the last example being delivered to South African Airways. Pressurization was an option, but all civilian DC-4s (and C-54s) were built unpressurized.

A total of 330 DC-4s and C-54s were used in the Berlin Airlift, which made them one of the most numerous types involved.

Purchasers of new-build DC-4s included Pan American Airways, National Airlines, Northwest Airlines, and Western Airlines in the US, and KLM Royal Dutch Air Lines, Scandinavian Airlines System, Iberia Airlines of Spain, Swissair, Air France, Sabena Belgian World Airlines, Cubana de Aviación, Avianca, Aerolíneas Argentinas, Aeropostal of Venezuela (1946), and South African Airways overseas. Several airlines used new-build DC-4s to start scheduled transatlantic flights between Latin America and Europe. Among the earliest were Aerolíneas Argentinas (1946), Iberia Airlines of Spain (1946), and Cubana de Aviación (1948).

Basic prices for a new DC-4 in 1946–47 were around £140,000-£160,000 (equivalent to £5,793,679 in 2025). In 1960, used DC-4s were available for around £80,000 (equivalent to £1,603,032 in 2025).

As of June 2020, two DC-4s were used for charters in South Africa by the South African Airways Museum Society, with both aircraft (ZS-BMH and ZS-AUB) carrying historical South African Airways livery.

Buffalo Airways of Yellowknife, Northwest Territories continues to operate the type commercially.

== Variants ==
DC-4
Main production airliner, postwar
Canadair North Star
Canadian production of a Rolls-Royce Merlin-powered variant, plus a single example powered with Pratt & Whitney R-2800s

Aviation Traders Carvair
British cargo and car ferry with a modified nose with a raised cockpit to allow cars to be loaded more easily

== Surviving aircraft ==
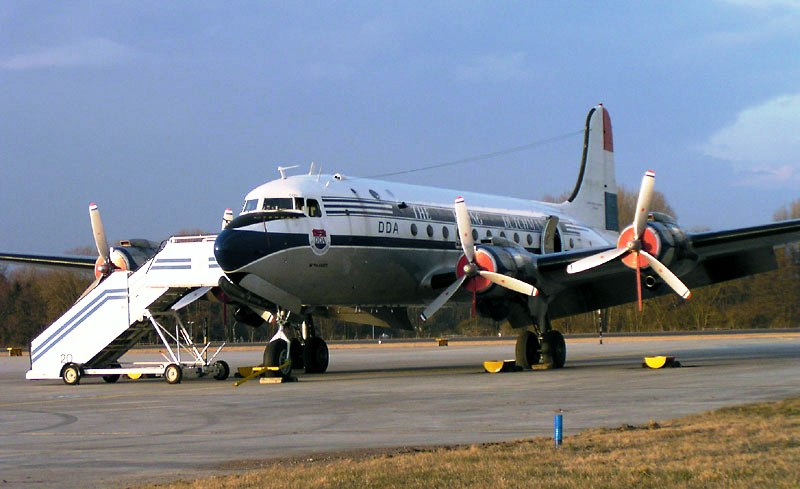
A DC-4 painted in the KLM "Flying Dutchman" scheme of the Dutch Dakota Association, Lelystad, Holland

Few DC-4s remain in service today.

- The last two passenger DC-4s operating worldwide are based in Johannesburg, South Africa. They fly with old South African Airways (SAA) livery. They are ZS-AUB Outeniqua and ZS-BMH Lebombo and are owned by the South African Airways Museum Society and operated by Skyclass Aviation, a company specialising in classic and VIP charters to exotic destinations in Africa.
- A 1944-built DC-4/C-54 is on display at Historical Aircraft Restoration Society in New South Wales, Australia, with a planned restoration to airworthiness.
- A 1945-built DC-4 (C-54D) 43-17228 (Civilian Registration N500EJ) is being operated by Berlin Airlift Historical Foundation as a flying museum of the Berlin Airlift. Called the Spirit of Freedom, it replaced a previous C-54 (44-9144) damaged by a tornado in 2020.
- One ex-Buffalo Airways DC-4 (N55CW c/n 10673, currently registered to Aircraft Guaranty Corp Trustee) is fitted with spray bars on top of the wings and is currently based in Florida on standby for oil pollution control.

== Specifications (DC-4-1009) ==
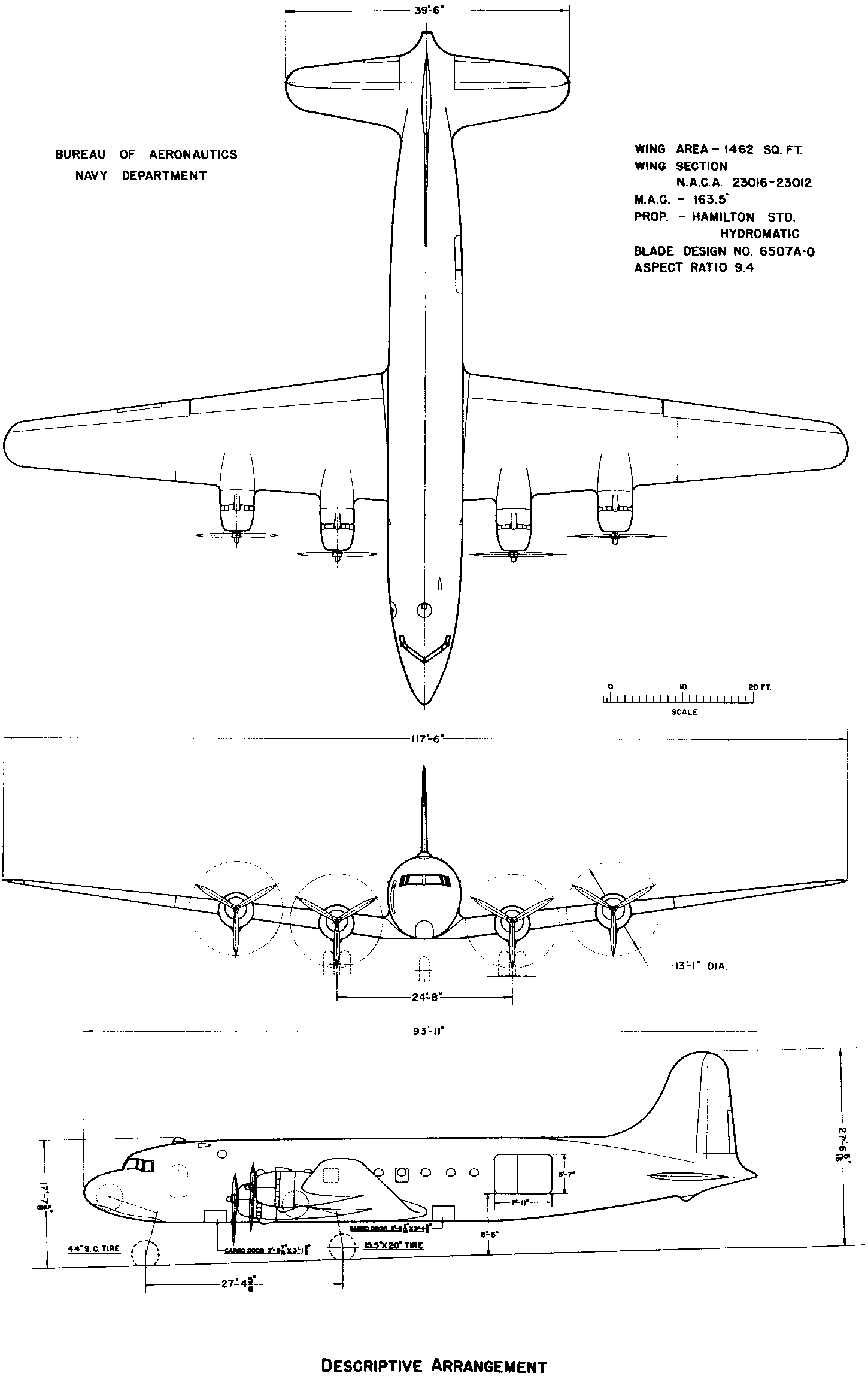
3-view line drawing of the Douglas R5D-2 Skymaster

Data from Jane's all the World's Aircraft 1947, McDonnell Douglas aircraft since 1920 : Volume I

General characteristics

- Crew: 4
- Capacity: Day transport: 44 pax with baggage and freight; Sleeper transport: 22 pax with baggage and freight; — later, up to 86 in high density seating
- Length: 93 ft 10 in (28.60 m)
- Wingspan: 117 ft 6 in (35.81 m)
- Height: 27 ft 6 in (8.38 m)
- Wing area: 1,460 sq ft (136 m^{2})
- Airfoil: root: NACA 23016; tip: NACA 23012
- Empty weight: 43,300 lb (19,641 kg)
- Gross weight: 63,500 lb (28,803 kg)
- Max takeoff weight: 73,000 lb (33,112 kg)
- Fuel capacity: 2,868 US gal (2,388 imp gal; 10,860 L) normal capacity or 3,592 US gal (2,991 imp gal; 13,600 L) with alternative inner wing tanks
- Powerplant: 4 × Pratt & Whitney R-2000-2SD13-G Twin Wasp 14-cylinder air-cooled radial piston engines, 1,450 hp (1,080 kW) each for take-off

1,100 hp (820 kW) at 14,000 ft (4,300 m)

- Propellers: 3-bladed Hamilton-Standard Hydromatic, 13 ft 1 in (3.99 m) diameter constant-speed propellers

Performance

- Maximum speed: 280 mph (450 km/h, 240 kn) at 14,000 ft (4,300 m)
- Cruise speed: 227 mph (365 km/h, 197 kn) 60% power at 10,000 ft (3,000 m)

Maximum cruise speed 246 mph (214 kn; 396 km/h) in high blower at 20,800 ft (6,300 m)

- Range: 3,300 mi (5,300 km, 2,900 nmi) at 10% above max L/D speed
- Ferry range: 4,250 mi (6,840 km, 3,690 nmi) with inner wing fuel cells
- Wing loading: 50.1 lb/sq ft (245 kg/m^{2}) at maximum gross weight
- Power/mass: 0.0787 hp/lb (0.1294 kW/kg) at maximum gross weight with take-off power

== See also ==
Related development

- Aviation Traders Carvair
- Canadair North Star
- Douglas DC-4E
- Douglas C-54 Skymaster
- Douglas DC-6
- Douglas DC-7

Aircraft of comparable role, configuration, and era

- Boeing 307 Stratoliner
- Lockheed Constellation
- Lockheed L-049 Constellation

Related lists

- List of aircraft
- List of civil aircraft

== Bibliography ==
- Aro, Chuck (April–July 1982). "Talkback". Air Enthusiast (18): 80. ISSN 0143-5450.
- Berry, Peter; et al. (1967). The Douglas DC-4. Tonbridge, Kent, UK: Air-Britain (Historians) Ltd.
- Blewett, R. (2007). Survivors. Coulsdon, UK: Aviation Classics. ISBN 978-0-9530413-4-3.
- Francillon, René (1979). McDonnell Douglas Aircraft Since 1920. Vol. I. London: Putnam. ISBN 0-87021-428-4.
- Griffith, Alan (2019). "Ploughshares into Swords: The Douglas DC-4/4E Bomber Projects". The Aviation Historian (28): 20–31. ISSN 2051-1930.
- Pearcy, Arthur (1995). Douglas Propliners: DC-1–DC-7. Shrewsbury, UK: Airlife Publishing. ISBN 1-85310-261-X.
- Yenne, Bill (1985). McDonnell Douglas: A Tale of Two Giants. Greenwich, Connecticut, US: Bison Books. ISBN 0-517-44287-6.
