= Dubai Royal Air Wing =

VVIP air transport operator of Dubai

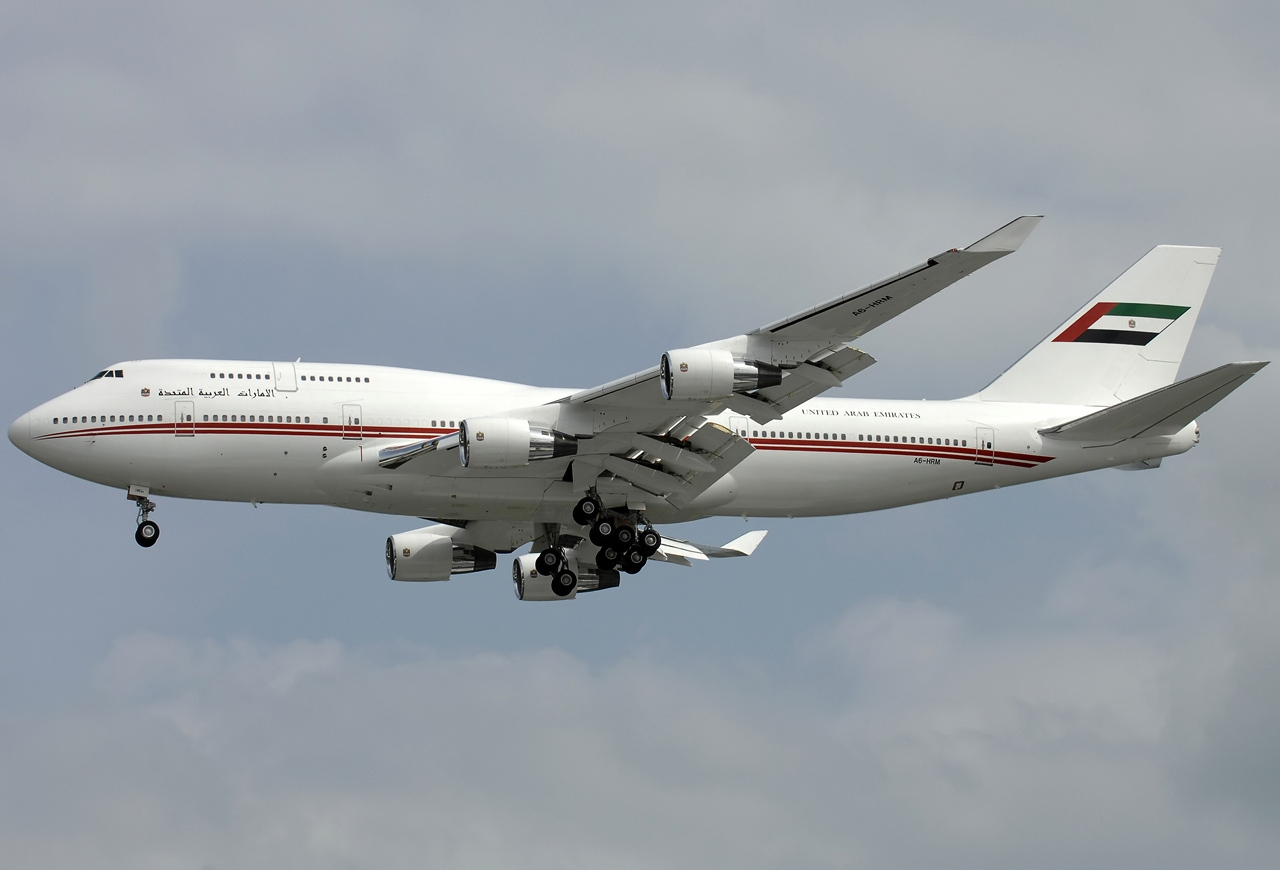
- A Dubai Royal Air Wing Boeing 747-422
IATA	ICAO	Call sign
-	DUB	DUBAI
- Operating bases: Dubai International Airport (DXB)
- Fleet size: 11
- Headquarters: Dubai, United Arab Emirates
- Employees: 201-500
- Website: airwing.govu.ae

Dubai Royal Air Wing (otherwise simply known as the "Royal Airwing") is a VVIP air transport operator for the royal family and government of Dubai, United Arab Emirates.

Dubai Royal Air Wing, located on the southeast side of Dubai International Airport (DXB), consists of a VIP terminal dedicated to the UAE royal family and special interest flights and is primarily used by the Emir of Dubai, the prime minister of the United Arab Emirates, members of the Dubai Royal family, as well as other influential government officials based in Dubai, United Arab Emirates.

The airline provided Emirates with their first aircraft but the two are not affiliated beyond both having ties with the government of Dubai.

== Fleet ==
=== Current fleet ===
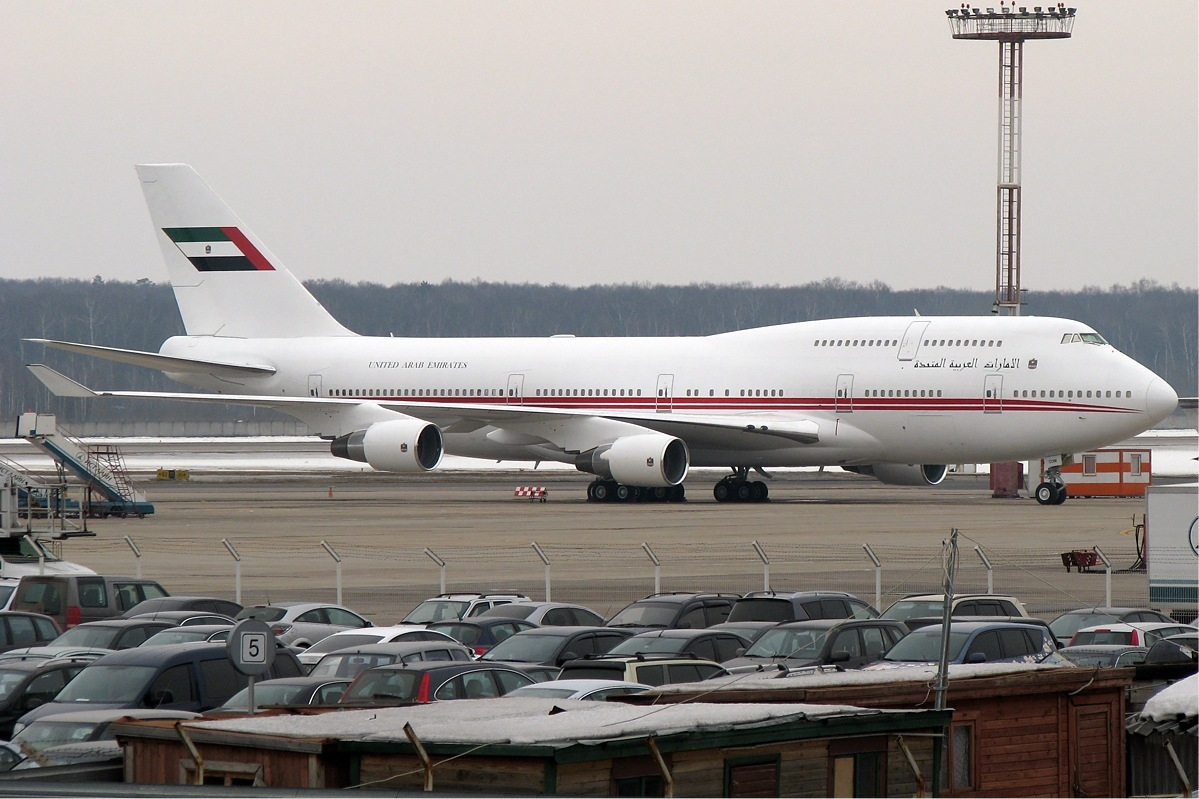
Boeing 747-400 of the Dubai Air Wing at Domodedovo International Airport, Russia in 2009.

The Dubai Air Wing fleet consists of the following known aircraft (as of July 2023):

Dubai Air Wing current fleet
Aircraft	Total	Order	Configuration	Notes
Boeing 737-700/BBJ	1	—	VIP	
Boeing 737-800	2	—	VIP	
Boeing 737-800/BBJ2	3	—	VIP	
Boeing 747-400	2	—	VIP	
Boeing 747-400M	1	—	VIP	Final 747-400M in operation
Boeing 747-400F	1	—	Cargo	
Boeing 777-200ER	1	—	VIP	
Total	11	—		

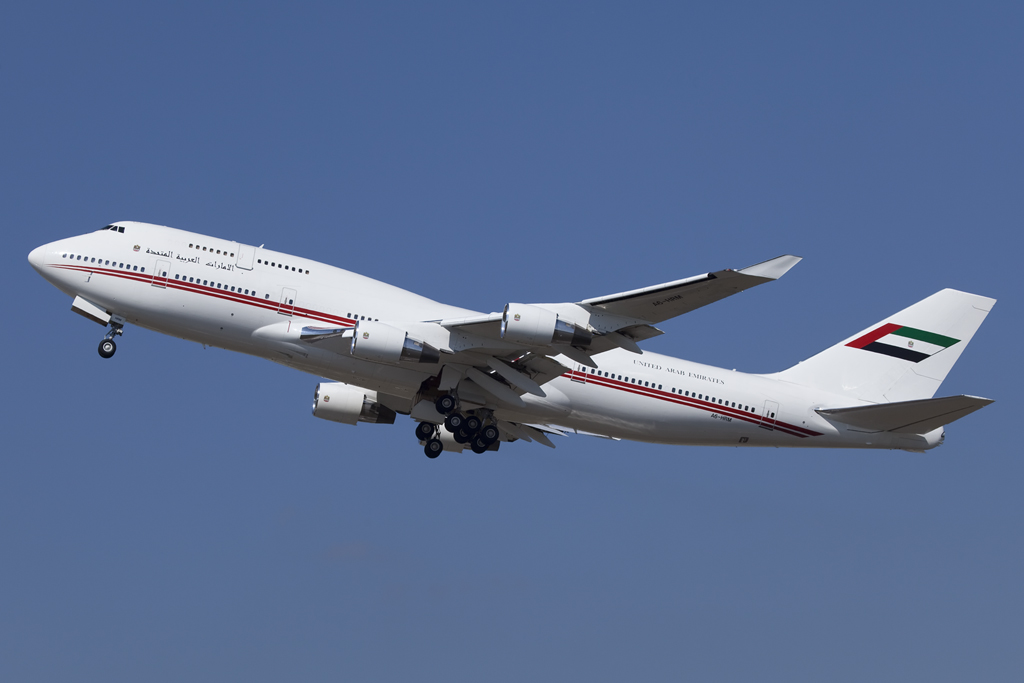
Boeing 747-400 of the Dubai Air Wing, used by the members of the UAE Royal family.

=== Historic fleet ===
The airline fleet previously included the following known aircraft:

Dubai Air Wing historic fleet
Aircraft	Total	Introduced	Retired	Notes
Boeing 727-200/Adv	2	1985	Unknown	Transferred to Emirates
Boeing 747-200F	1	2000	2010	
Boeing 747-400M	1	2019	2022	
Boeing 747SP	2	1994	2004	
British Aerospace Avro RJ85	2	2008	2021	
