= Avia (airline) =

Airline based in Johannesburg, South Africa

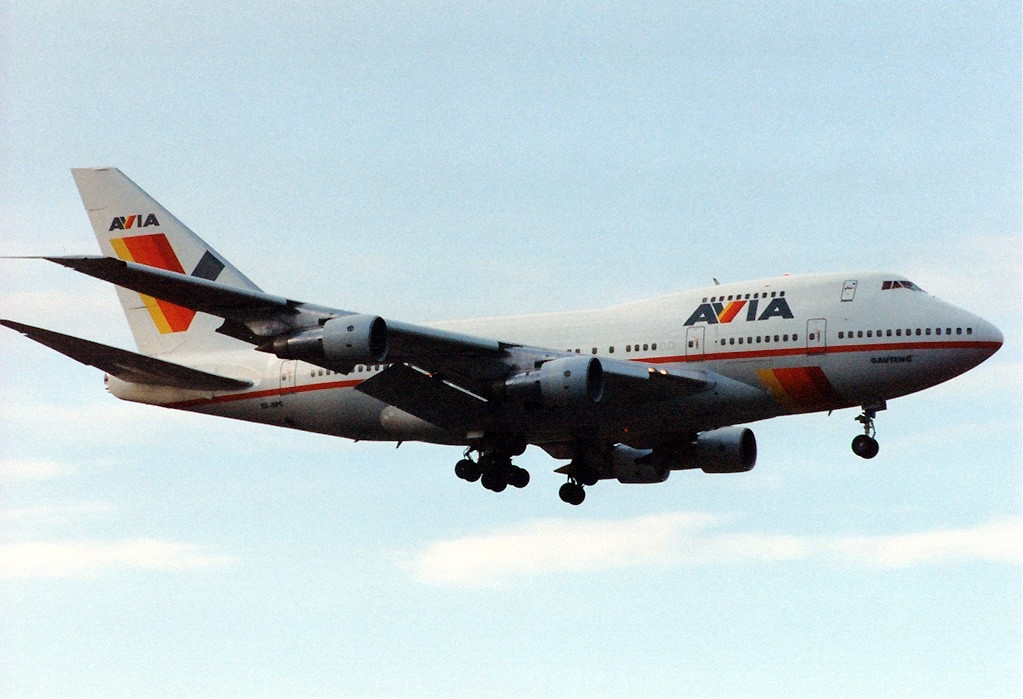
Avia Boeing 747SP.

Avia (ICAO: AGW) was an airline based in Johannesburg, South Africa, it started operations in April 1995 and ended them in August of the same year. Avia flew from Johannesburg to London-Gatwick Airport, which was their only route. They operated one Boeing 747SP.
