= Avia Air =

IATA	ICAO	Call sign
3R	ARB	Aviair
- Ceased operations: November 2003
- Fleet size: See Fleet below
- Headquarters: Oranjestad, Aruba

Avia Air was an airline based in Aruba.

== Code data ==
- IATA Code: 3R
- ICAO Code: ARB
- Callsign: Aviair

== History ==
Avia Air suspended service in November 2003 and was working to restructure its operations under bankruptcy protection.

== Fleet ==
- Short 360-200
- Embraer EMB 110 Bandeirante
