= Presidential Flight (UAE) =

Organisation responsible for Abu Dhabi governmental air travel

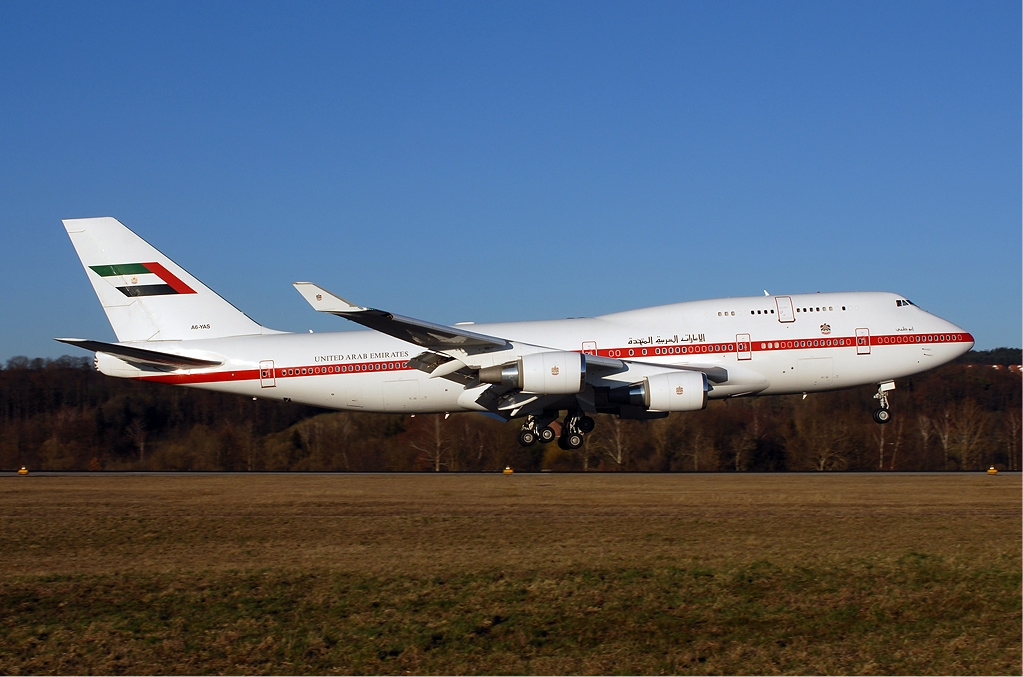
- A Presidential Flight Boeing 747-400
IATA	ICAO	Call sign
MO	AUH	SULTAN
- Founded: 1975
- Operating bases: Abu Dhabi International Airport (AUH)
- Fleet size: 8
- Headquarters: Abu Dhabi, United Arab Emirates
- Website: http://pf.gov.ae

Presidential Flight (previously known as Royal Flight and Amiri Flight) is the organization responsible for air transport of the government of Abu Dhabi, United Arab Emirates. It was first established in 1975 under the Private Department of Sheikh Zayed Bin Sultan Al Nahyan.

The airline previously operated under the name Abu Dhabi Amiri Flight and changed its name to Presidential Flight on 16 February 2009.

== Fleet ==
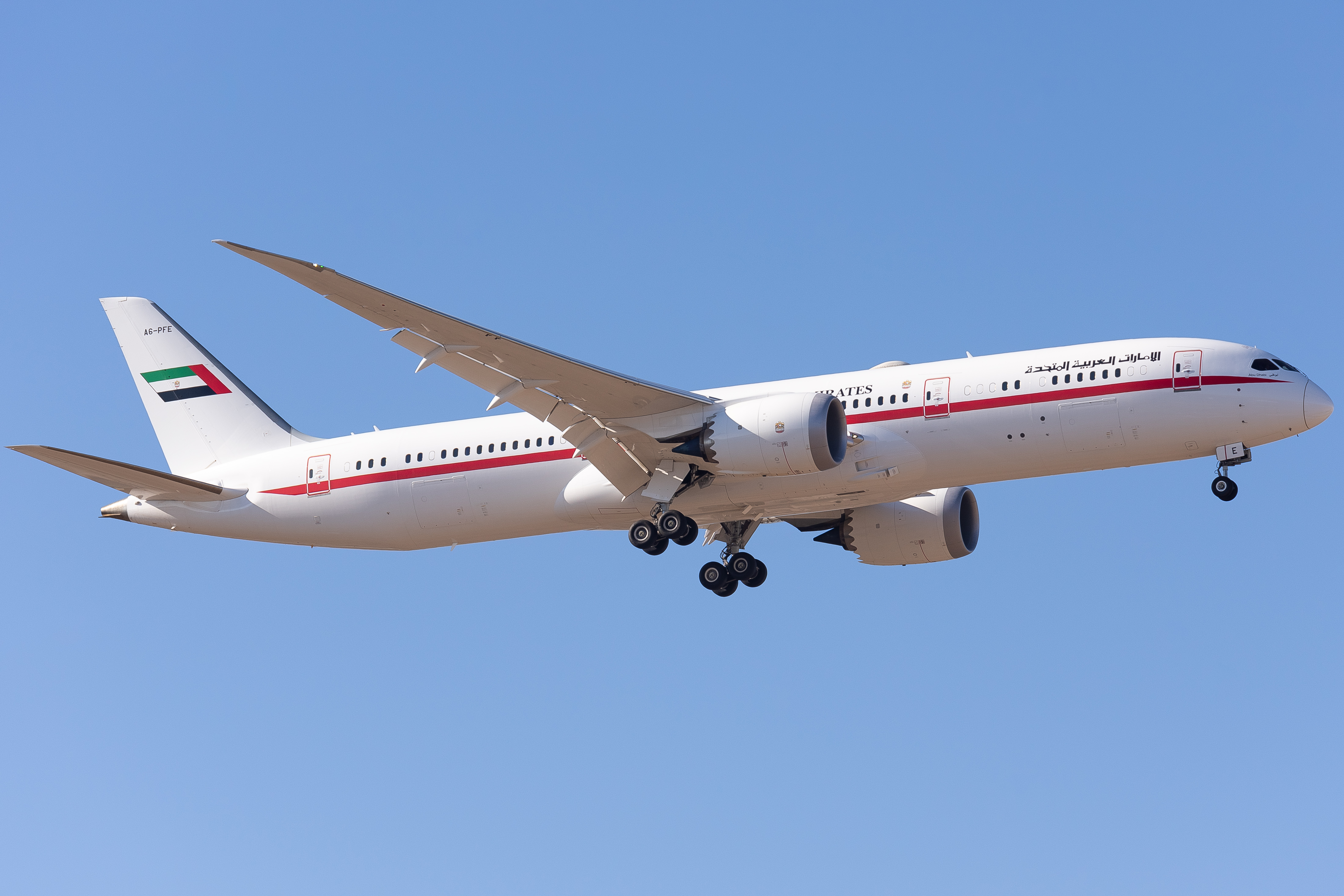
Boeing 787-9 of the Presidential Flight in 2022

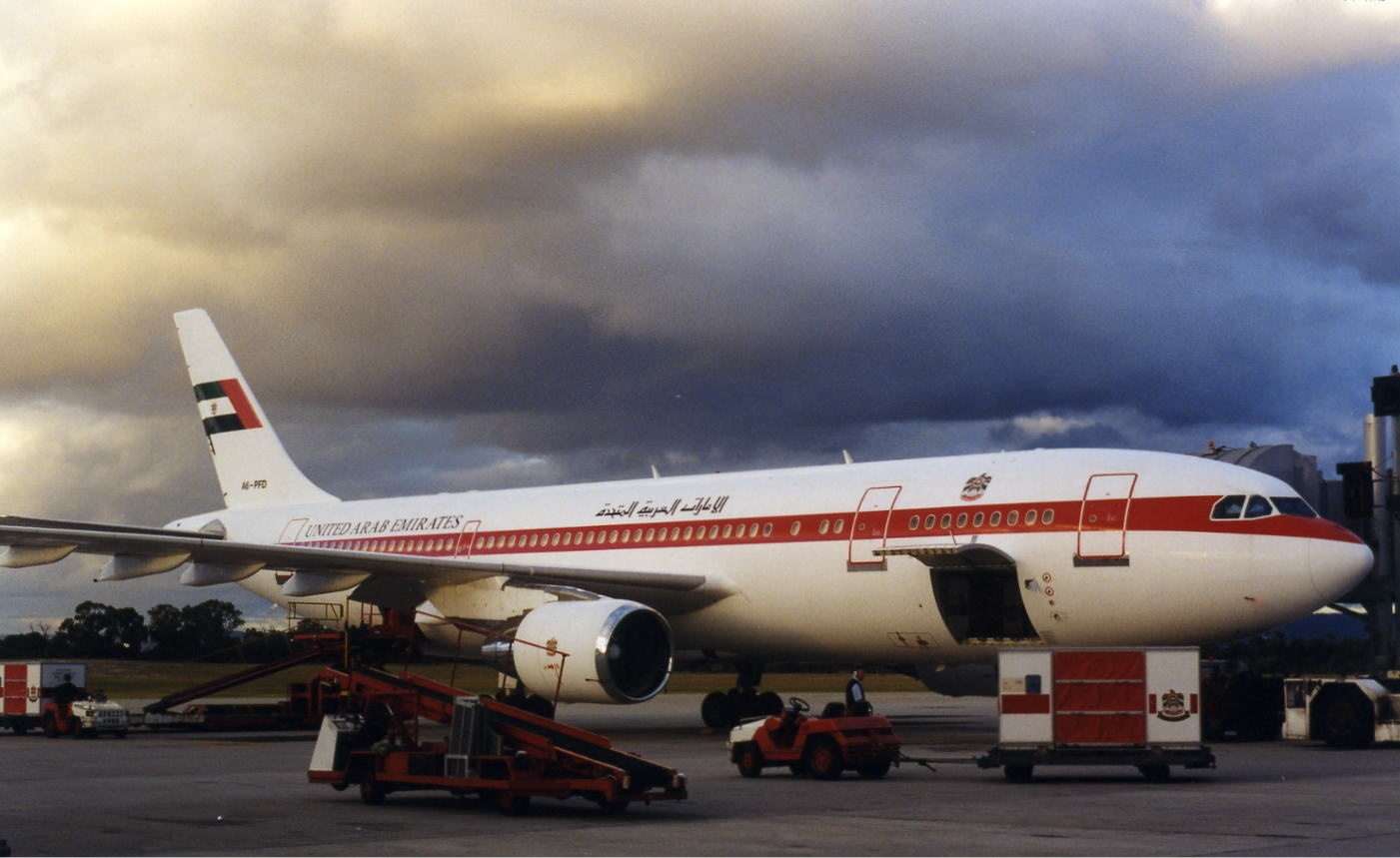
Airbus A300-600R of the Presidential Flight at Perth Airport, Australia, in 1990s.

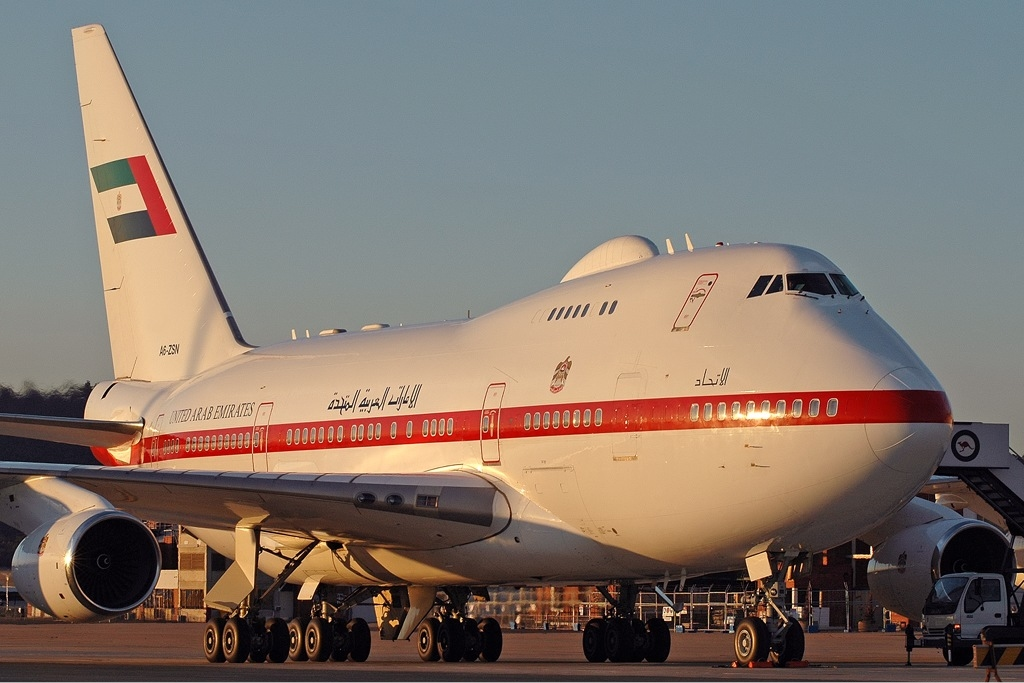
Amiri Flight Boeing 747SP

=== Current fleet ===
The Presidential Flight fleet consists of the following aircraft (as of June 2024):

Presidential Flight current fleet
Aircraft	Total	Config	Notes
Boeing 737-800/BBJ2	1	VIP	Named Al Wathba / الوثبة
Boeing 777-200ER	1	VIP	Named Al Ain / العين
Boeing 777-300ER	2	VIP	One aircraft named Al Ain / العين
Boeing 787-8	1	VIP	Named Al Dhafra / الظفرة
Boeing 787-9	3	VIP	One aircraft named Abu Dhabi / أَبُو ظَبْيٍ
Total	8		

=== Historic fleet ===
The fleet previously included the following aircraft:

Presidential Flight historic fleet
Aircraft	Total	Config	Retired	Notes
Airbus A320-200	1	VIP	Aug 2023	Named Delma / دلما
Boeing 737-700 BBJ	1	VIP	Jun 2010	-
Boeing 747SP	1	VIP	Feb 2007	-
Boeing 747-400M	1	VIP	Dec 2015	-
Boeing 747-400	1	VIP	Oct 2015	Named Abu Dhabi / أبو ظبي
Boeing 747-8I	1	VIP	Oct 2017	Named Al Emarat / الإمارات
Boeing 767-300	1	VIP	Jul 2010	-
BAE Systems Avro RJ100	1	VIP	Mar 2016	-
British Aerospace Avro RJ70	1	VIP	Mar 2015	-
Total	9			
