= List of Gulf Air destinations =

As of February 2026, Gulf Air flies (or has flown) to the following destinations from its hub at Bahrain International Airport.

== List ==
Country	City	Airport	Notes	Refs
Australia	Melbourne	Melbourne Airport	Terminated	
Australia	Sydney	Sydney Airport	Terminated	
Azerbaijan	Baku	Heydar Aliyev International Airport		
Bahrain	Al Muharraq	Bahrain International Airport	Hub	
Bangladesh	Dhaka	Hazrat Shahjalal International Airport		
Bosnia and Herzegovina	Sarajevo	Sarajevo International Airport	Seasonal	
China	Guangzhou	Guangzhou Baiyun International Airport		
China	Shanghai	Shanghai Pudong International Airport		
Cyprus	Larnaca	Larnaca International Airport		
Denmark	Copenhagen	Copenhagen Airport	Terminated	
Egypt	Alexandria	Borg El Arab International Airport	Seasonal	
Egypt	Cairo	Cairo International Airport		
Egypt	Sharm El Sheikh	Sharm El Sheikh International Airport	Seasonal	
Egypt	El Alamein	El Alamein International Airport	Seasonal	
Ethiopia	Addis Ababa	Addis Ababa Bole International Airport	Terminated	
France	Nice	Nice Côte d'Azur Airport	Seasonal	
France	Paris	Charles de Gaulle Airport		
Georgia	Tbilisi	Tbilisi International Airport		
Germany	Frankfurt	Frankfurt Airport		
Germany	Munich	Munich Airport		
Greece	Athens	Athens International Airport		
Greece	Mykonos	Mykonos Airport	Seasonal	
Greece	Rhodes	Rhodes International Airport	Seasonal	
Greece	Santorini	Santorini International Airport	Seasonal	
Hong Kong	Hong Kong	Hong Kong International Airport	Terminated	
Hong Kong	Hong Kong	Kai Tak Airport	Airport closed	
India	Bengaluru	Kempegowda International Airport		
India	Chennai	Chennai International Airport		
India	Delhi	Indira Gandhi International Airport		
India	Goa	Dabolim Airport		
India	Hyderabad	Rajiv Gandhi International Airport		
India	Kolkata	Netaji Subhas Chandra Bose International Airport	Terminated	
India	Kochi	Cochin International Airport		
India	Kozhikode	Calicut International Airport	Terminated	
India	Mumbai	Chhatrapati Shivaji Maharaj International Airport		
India	Thiruvananthapuram	Thiruvananthapuram International Airport		
Indonesia	Jakarta	Soekarno–Hatta International Airport	Terminated	
Iran	Isfahan	Isfahan International Airport	Terminated	
Iran	Mashhad	Mashhad International Airport	Terminated	
Iran	Shiraz	Shiraz International Airport	Terminated	
Iran	Tehran	Imam Khomeini International Airport	Terminated	
Iraq	Baghdad	Baghdad International Airport		
Iraq	Basra	Basra International Airport	Terminated	
Iraq	Erbil	Erbil International Airport	Terminated	
Iraq	Najaf	Al Najaf International Airport		
Ireland	Dublin	Dublin Airport	Terminated	
Israel	Tel Aviv	Ben Gurion Airport	Suspended	
Italy	Milan	Milan Malpensa Airport		
Italy	Rome	Rome Fiumicino Airport		
Jordan	Amman	Queen Alia International Airport		
Kenya	Nairobi	Jomo Kenyatta International Airport		
Kuwait	Kuwait City	Kuwait International Airport		
Lebanon	Beirut	Beirut–Rafic Hariri International Airport	Terminated	
Malaysia	Kuala Lumpur	Kuala Lumpur International Airport		
Maldives	Malé	Velana International Airport		
Morocco	Casablanca	Mohammed V International Airport		
Nepal	Kathmandu	Kathmandu International Airport	Terminated	
Netherlands	Amsterdam	Amsterdam Airport Schiphol	Terminated	
Oman	Muscat	Muscat International Airport		
Oman	Salalah	Salalah International Airport	Seasonal	
Pakistan	Islamabad	Islamabad International Airport		
Pakistan	Karachi	Jinnah International Airport		
Pakistan	Lahore	Allama Iqbal International Airport		
Philippines	Cebu	Mactan–Cebu International Airport	Terminated	
Philippines	Manila	Ninoy Aquino International Airport		
Qatar	Doha	Hamad International Airport		
Russia	Moscow	Moscow Domodedovo Airport	Terminated	
Russia	Moscow	Sheremetyevo International Airport		
Russia	Sochi	Adler-Sochi International Airport	Seasonal	
Saudi Arabia	Al-'Ula	Prince Abdul Majeed bin Abdulaziz International Airport	Seasonal	
Saudi Arabia	Buraidah	Prince Nayef bin Abdulaziz International Airport		
Saudi Arabia	Dammam	King Fahd International Airport		
Saudi Arabia	Jeddah	King Abdulaziz International Airport		
Saudi Arabia	Medina	Prince Mohammad bin Abdulaziz International Airport		
Saudi Arabia	Riyadh	King Khalid International Airport		
Saudi Arabia	Taif	Taif International Airport	Terminated	
Singapore	Singapore	Changi Airport		
Spain	Málaga	Málaga–Costa del Sol Airport	Seasonal	
South Africa	Durban	Durban International Airport	Terminated	
South Africa	Johannesburg	O. R. Tambo International Airport	Terminated	
Sri Lanka	Colombo	Bandaranaike International Airport		
Sudan	Khartoum	Khartoum International Airport	Terminated	
Switzerland	Geneva	Geneva Airport	Seasonal	
Switzerland	Zurich	Zurich Airport	Terminated	
Syria	Damascus	Damascus International Airport	Terminated	
Tanzania	Dar es Salaam	Julius Nyerere International Airport	Terminated	
Tanzania	Zanzibar	Zanzibar International Airport	Terminated	
Thailand	Bangkok	Don Mueang International Airport	Terminated	
Thailand	Bangkok	Suvarnabhumi Airport		
Thailand	Chiang Mai	Chiang Mai International Airport	Terminated	
Turkey	Bodrum	Milas–Bodrum Airport		
Turkey	Istanbul	Istanbul Airport		
Turkey	Trabzon	Trabzon Airport	Seasonal	
Uganda	Entebbe	Entebbe International Airport	Terminated	
United Arab Emirates	Abu Dhabi	Zayed International Airport		
United Arab Emirates	Al Ain	Al Ain International Airport	Terminated	
United Arab Emirates	Dubai	Al Maktoum International Airport	Terminated	
United Arab Emirates	Dubai	Dubai International Airport		
United Arab Emirates	Fujairah	Fujairah International Airport	Terminated	
United Arab Emirates	Ras Al Khaimah	Ras Al Khaimah International Airport	Terminated	
United Arab Emirates	Sharjah	Sharjah International Airport	Terminated	
United Kingdom	London	Gatwick Airport		
United Kingdom	London	Heathrow Airport		
United Kingdom	Manchester	Manchester Airport		
United States	Houston	George Bush Intercontinental Airport	Terminated	
United States	New York City	John F. Kennedy International Airport		
Vietnam	Hanoi	Noi Bai International Airport	Terminated	
Vietnam	Ho Chi Minh City	Tan Son Nhat International Airport	Terminated	
Yemen	Aden	Aden International Airport	Terminated	
Yemen	Sanaa	Sanaa International Airport	Terminated	
