= Rotana Jet =

Emirati airline

IATA	ICAO	Call sign
RG	RJD	ROTANA
- Founded: 2010
- AOC #: UAE AC-0006
- Hubs: Abu Dhabi Al Bateen Executive Airport
- Secondary hubs: Abu Dhabi International Airport
- Focus cities: Sir Bani Yas Airport; Delma Airport; Al Ain International Airport; Fujairah International Airport
- Fleet size: 2
- Headquarters: Abu Dhabi, UAE
- Key people: Sheikh Ahmed bin Saif Al Nahyan (Chairman)
- Website: www.rotanajet.com

Rotana Jet (Arabic: روتانا جت Rūtānā Jat) is an airline with its main base at Al Bateen Executive Airport, Abu Dhabi. Its corporate head office is located in the NOVOTEL Gate Hotel, Khor Al Maqta Gate City, Abu Dhabi, United Arab Emirates. While it initially operated only executive charter flights; Rotana started scheduled flights to Sir Bani Yas island in June 2012 but suspended scheduled operations in 2017. Its flights to Fujairah made it the first domestic airline to connect two emirates. On 6 April 2014, the airline announced Colombo and Mattala as its first international destinations outside the Gulf Cooperation Council.

== Destinations ==
^{Hub}	Hub
¤	Focus Cities
^	Future destinations
^{[T]}	Terminated destinations

Country	City	Airport	Notes	Refs
Bahrain	Bahrain	Bahrain International Airport	Terminated	
Bangladesh	Chittagong	Shah Amanat International Airport	Terminated	
Bangladesh	Dhaka	Hazrat Shahjalal International Airport	Terminated	
India	Hyderabad	Rajiv Gandhi International Airport	Terminated	
India	Mumbai	Chhatrapati Shivaji International Airport	Terminated	
Jordan	Amman	Queen Alia International Airport	Terminated	
Kuwait	Kuwait City	Kuwait International Airport	Terminated	
Lebanon	Beirut	Rafic Hariri International Airport	Terminated	
Oman	Salalah	Salalah Airport	Terminated	
Oman	Muscat	Muscat International Airport	Terminated	
Pakistan	Rahim Yar Khan	Shaikh Zayed International Airport	Terminated	
Pakistan	Gwadar	New Gwadar International Airport		
Pakistan	Karachi	Jinnah International Airport	Terminated	
Qatar	Doha	Hamad International Airport	Terminated	
Saudi Arabia	Jeddah	King Abdulaziz International Airport	Terminated	
Saudi Arabia	Riyadh	King Khaled International Airport	Terminated	
Sri Lanka	Colombo	Bandaranaike International Airport	Terminated	
Sri Lanka	Hambantota	Mattala Rajapaksa International Airport	Terminated	
United Arab Emirates	Abu Dhabi	Abu Dhabi International Airport^{Int}	Hub	
United Arab Emirates	Abu Dhabi	Al Bateen Executive Airport^{Base}	Private Jet Services	
United Arab Emirates	Al Ain	Al Ain International Airport	Terminated	
United Arab Emirates	Dalma (island)	Delma Airport	Focus city	
United Arab Emirates	Dubai	Al Maktoum International Airport		
United Arab Emirates	Dubai	Dubai International Airport	Terminated	
United Arab Emirates	Fujairah	Fujairah International Airport	Terminated	
United Arab Emirates	Sir Bani Yas	Sir Bani Yas Airport	Terminated	

== Fleet ==
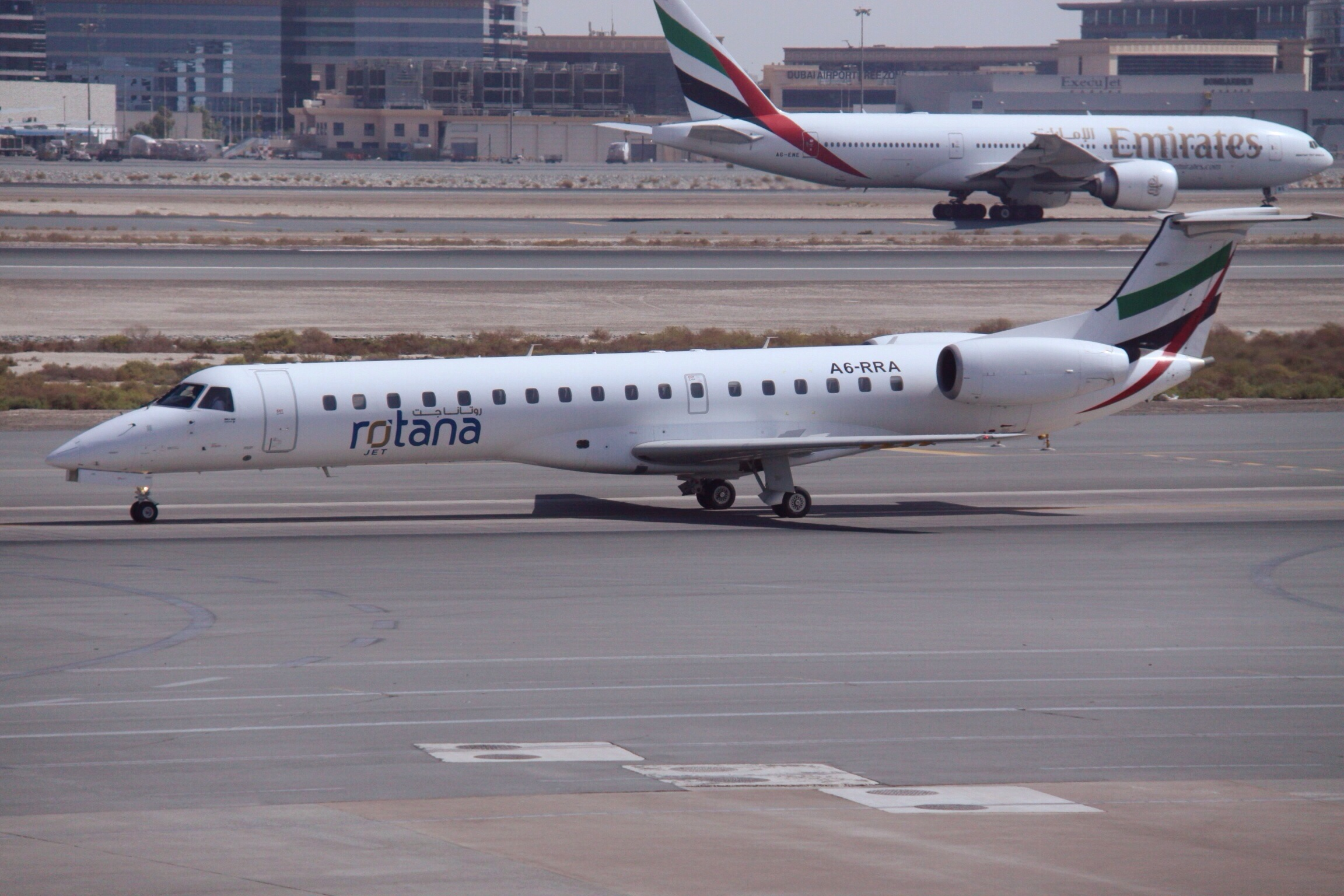
Rotana Jet Embraer 145 at Dubai International Airport

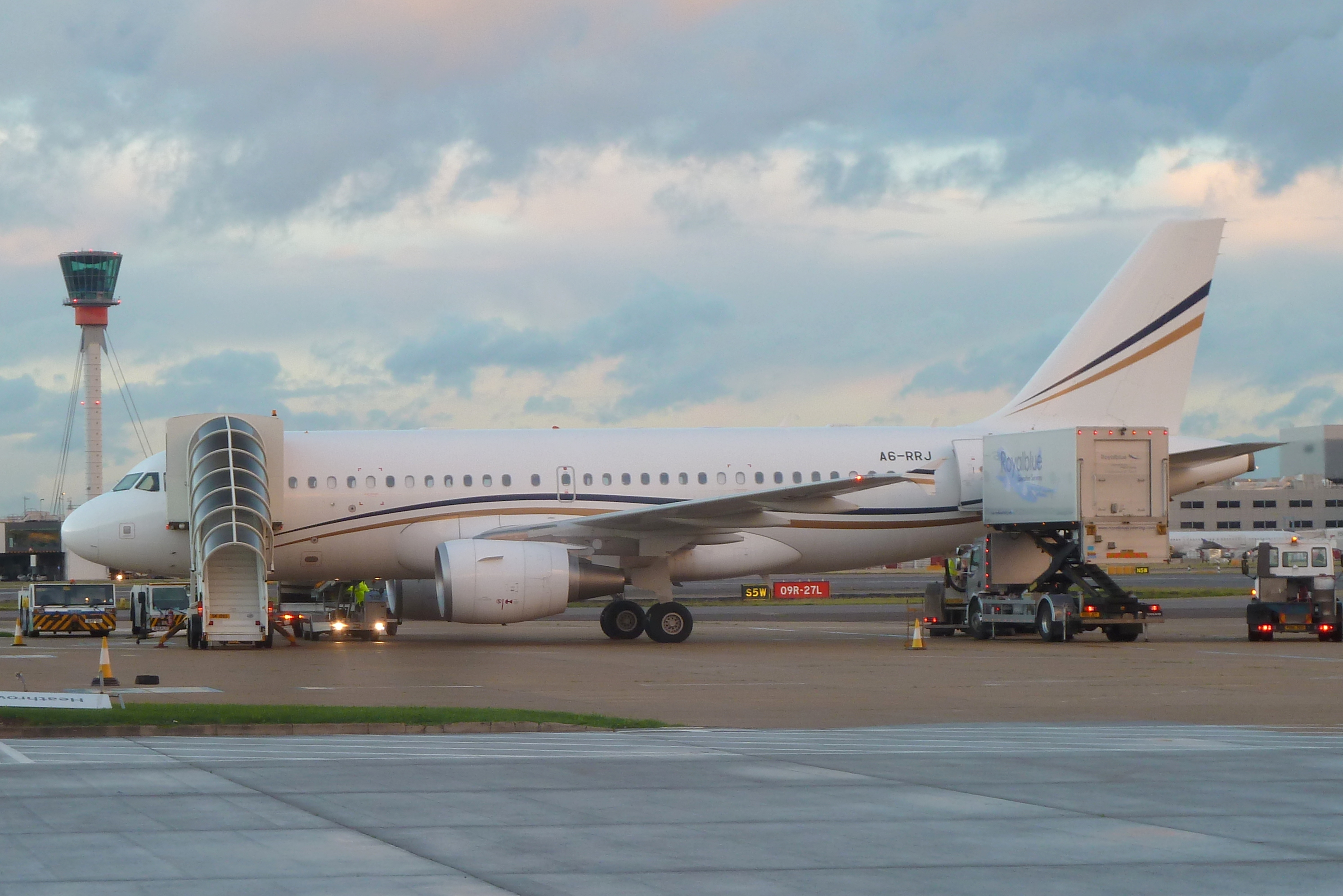
Rotana Jet Airbus ACJ319 at London Heathrow Airport

The Rotana Jet fleet comprises the following aircraft (as of July 2019):

Rotana Jet Fleet
Aircraft	In Fleet	Orders	Passengers	Notes
Gulfstream G450	1	—	14	
Airbus A319-100 CJ	1	—	50	
Total	2	—		

The airline fleet previously included the following aircraft (as of July 2017):

- 1 Gulfstream G450
- 2 Embraer ERJ 145 (out of service)
- 1 Airbus A319-100
