= Al Bateen Executive Airport =

General aviation airport of Abu Dhabi, United Arab Emirates

Al Bateen Executive Airport مطار البطين
- IATA: AZI; ICAO: OMAD

Summary
- Airport type: Public/Military
- Operator: Abu Dhabi Airports Company
- Serves: Abu Dhabi
- Opened: 1970
- Time zone: UAE Standard Time (UTC+04:00)
- Elevation AMSL: 16 ft (4.9 m)
- Coordinates: 24°25′42″N 54°27′29″E

Map
- Location in the UAE OMAD (Persian Gulf) OMAD (Indian Ocean) OMAD (Middle East) OMAD (West and Central Asia) OMAD (Asia)

Runways
Direction	Length		Surface
Direction	m	ft	Surface
13/31	3,202	10,505	Asphalt
- Sources: DoD FLIP

Al Bateen Executive Airport (Arabic: مطار البطين, IATA: AZI, ICAO: OMAD) is a dedicated business jet international airport located 6.5 nautical miles (12.0 km; 7.5 mi) south-east of the city centre of Abu Dhabi, United Arab Emirates. The airport is on the Abu Dhabi island. Other tenants include aviation assets of the UAE government. It opened in 1970, as Abu Dhabi International Airport (not to be confused with the current Zayed International Airport, also formerly called Abu Dhabi International Airport) to replace the city's previous airport.

== History ==
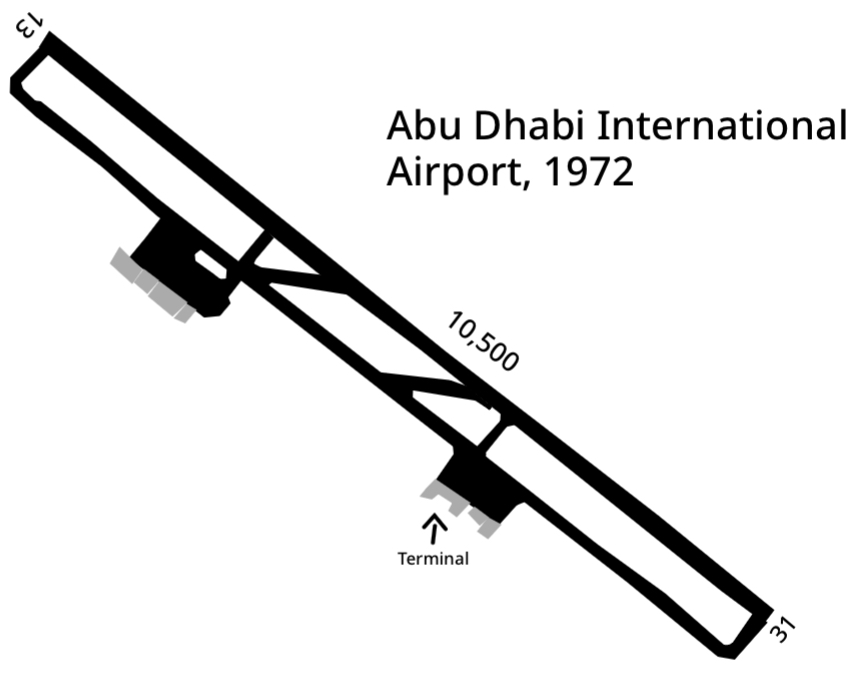
Abu Dhabi International Airport (now Al-Bateen Airport) in 1972.

The airport was built in the 1960s and officially opened in 1970. Following the opening of the new Abu Dhabi International Airport in 1982, it was renamed Al Bateen Airport.. In November 1976, a $5.5 million contract was awarded to English contractor Wimpey Asphalt for the resurfacing of the runway. The contractor had to ship heavy equipment from Britain and Italy to carry out the work. Resurfacing works were completed within the six month timeframe, becoming Wimpey's first project in Abu Dhabi.

In 1982, a new airport was opened on the mainland southeast of the city to accommodate the increasing air traffic. The terminal building was later repurposed, and the airport continued operating as Al Bateen Airport, primarily for military, government and business aviation.

In 1983, Al Bateen became a military airbase, known as Bateen Air Base.

Starting on 17 August 1990, two units of the United States Air Force deployed to Al Bateen in preparation of what would ultimately become the Gulf War. The first unit deployed to Al Bateen was the 314th Military Airlift Squadron from Little Rock Air Force Base, Arkansas with sixteen Lockheed C-130E Hercules transport aircraft. It was joined by the 41st Electronic Combat Squadron from Davis–Monthan Air Force Base, Arizona with ultimately six Lockheed EC-130H Compass Call electronic attack aircraft, starting 26 August 1990.

The airport remained under military control until 2008, when it became a civilian airport focusing on executive jets under the name Al Bateen Executive Airport.

On December 8, 2022, the airport was the site of the Viktor Bout–Brittney Griner prisoner exchange.

In April 2023, Jetex, Dubai-based aviation company, announced opening a private terminal (FBO) in Al Bateen Executive Airport.

== Government use ==
Al Bateen's tenants include a UAE Naval Aviation helicopter squadron and the Abu Dhabi Police Department air wing.

== Passenger airlines and destinations ==
Rotana Jet operates private jet services from the airport, having moved all scheduled commercial operations to Zayed International Airport Terminal 2 in October 2014.

Solar Impulse 2, a Swiss experimental solar-powered aircraft, was given its final touches here in 2015. It used the airport as the starting point for its Around the World circumnavigation attempt. The aircraft took off on 9 March 2015 and flew to nearby Oman and then onwards to India. It was also used as the landing site for the final leg from Cairo to Abu Dhabi, landing July 25, 2016.

== Historical airlines and destinations ==
=== Passenger ===
Airlines	Destinations
Air France	Paris–Charles de Gaulle
Air India	Bombay
Air Lanka	Colombo
Biman Bangladesh Airlines	Dacca–Tejgaon, Dacca–Hazrat Shahjalal
B.O.A.C.	London–Heathrow
British Airways	London–Heathrow
EgyptAir	Cairo
Ethiopian Airlines	Sanaa
Gulf Air	Bahrain
Gulf Aviation	Bahrain
Iran Air	Shiraz
KLM	Amsterdam
Kuwait Airways	Kuwait City
Lufthansa	Frankfurt
Middle East Airlines	Beirut
Pakistan International Airlines	Gwadar, Karachi, Lahore
Rotana Jet	Muscat
Royal Jordanian	Amman-Civil
Saudia	Jeddah, Riyadh
Somali Airlines	Mogadishu
Syrian Air	Damascus
Tunisair	Damascus
Yemenia	Sanaa
Sudan Airways	Khartoum
Singapore Airlines	Singapore-Paya Lebar, Singapore-Changi

=== Cargo ===
Airline	Destinations
German Cargo	Frankfurt
PIA Cargo	Damascus, Istanbul–Atatürk

== Depictions ==
The airport is depicted in a set of postage stamps issued March 1969 by Abu Dhabi.
