= List of Oman Air destinations =

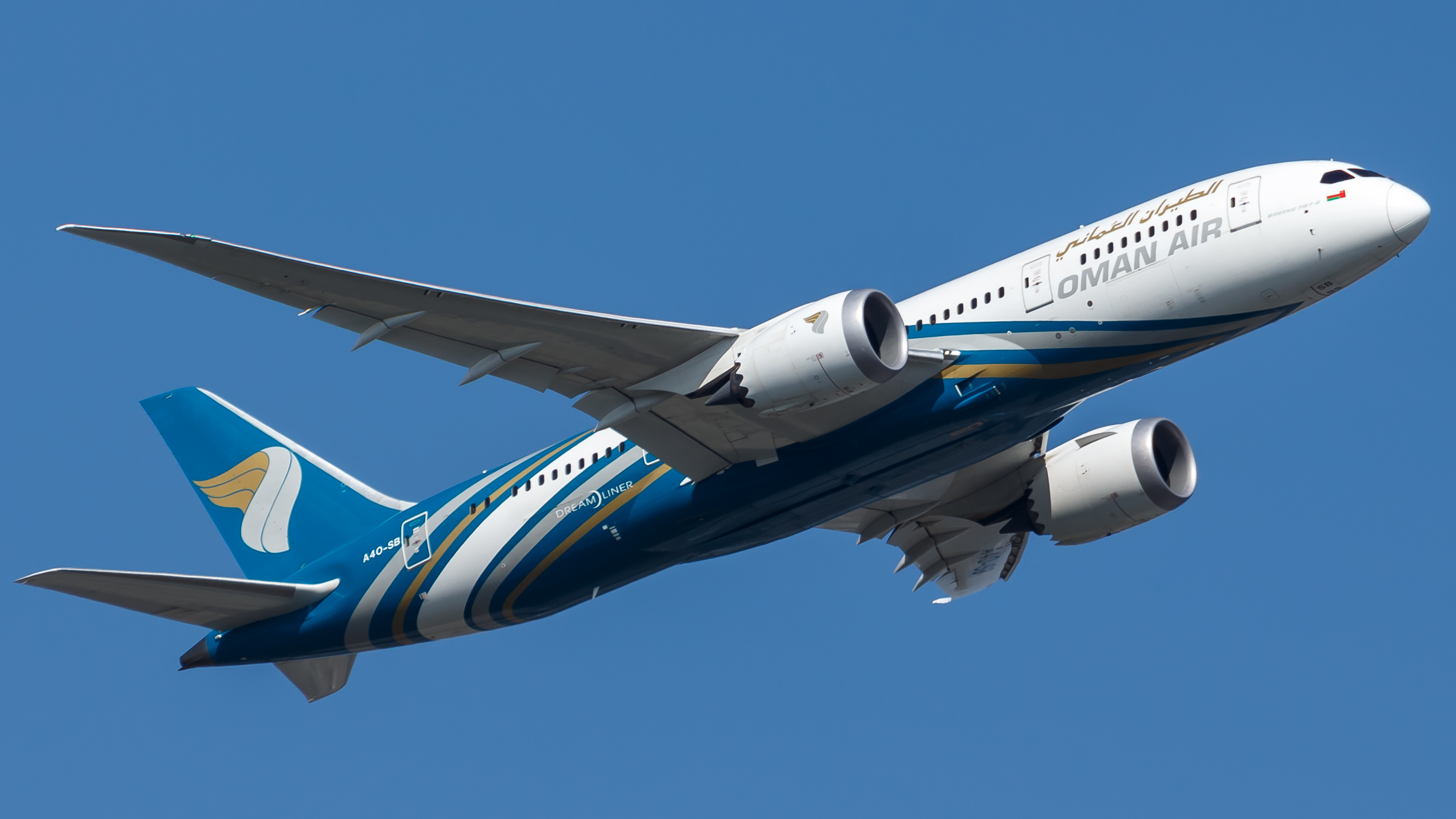
Oman Air operates 43 destinations in 24 countries across the Middle East, Asia, Africa, and Europe.

Oman Air serves the following scheduled destinations as of November 2024:

== History ==
The airline's first flight occurred in March 1993 when it flew from Muscat to Salalah which was a domestic flight with a leased Boeing 737-300 from Ansett Worldwide Aviation Services. Months later, Oman Air had then performed its first international flight from Muscat to Dubai which also used the Boeing 737-300. By 1994, Oman Air had launched flights to Kuwait City and Karachi and later in 1994 it announced flights to Trivandrum in India and Colombo in Sri Lanka. Between 1995 and 1997, Mumbai, Doha, Abu Dhabi, Dhaka, and Chennai were then added to the airline's network. Gwadar, Peshawar, Al Ain, and Jeddah were then added between 1998 and 1999. Also between 1998 and 2000, Oman Air launched a flight to Kochi. Kozhikode was then added to the airline's network. However, in 2000, Oman Air discontinued services to Gwadar and Peshawar due to a strategic shift, and even Al Ain was suspended. In the 2000s, the airline expanded into Europe when the airline had launched flights to London-Heathrow and then launched a flight to Paris and Frankfurt and even Munich were added to Oman Air's European network and the airline then expanded operations in India with Delhi, Chennai, and Hyderabad including Jaipur and Amritsar being added to the network.

The airline also expanded into Southeast Asia with a codeshare agreement with Malaysia Airlines when the airline had started flying to Kuala Lumpur and Bangkok. The airline also launched a flight to Male in the Maldives. However, the airline had to suspend operations in Jaipur and Amritsar. During the 2000s, services to Kenya were axed, Kathmandu was suspended before 2010, and the airline withdrew services to Beirut and Colombo.

Due to financial reasons, many of the previous destinations (specially short ones, such as Iran) served by Oman Air, are being served by SalamAir, an Omani low-cost carrier.

== List ==
Country	City	Airport	Notes	Refs
Bahrain	Manama	Bahrain International Airport		
Bangladesh	Chittagong	Shah Amanat International Airport	Terminated	
Bangladesh	Dhaka	Hazrat Shahjalal International Airport		
China	Guangzhou	Guangzhou Baiyun International Airport	Terminated	
Egypt	Cairo	Cairo International Airport		
France	Paris	Charles de Gaulle Airport		
Germany	Frankfurt	Frankfurt Airport		
Germany	Munich	Munich Airport		
Greece	Athens	Athens International Airport		
India	Amritsar	Sri Guru Ram Dass Jee International Airport	Terminated	
India	Bengaluru	Kempegowda International Airport		
India	Chennai	Chennai International Airport		
India	Delhi	Indira Gandhi International Airport		
India	Goa	Dabolim Airport	Terminated	
India	Goa	Manohar International Airport		
India	Hyderabad	Rajiv Gandhi International Airport		
India	Jaipur	Jaipur International Airport	Terminated	
India	Kochi	Cochin International Airport		
India	Kolkata	Netaji Subhas Chandra Bose International Airport	Terminated	
India	Kozhikode	Calicut International Airport		
India	Lucknow	Chaudhary Charan Singh International Airport		
India	Mumbai	Chhatrapati Shivaji Maharaj International Airport		
India	Thiruvananthapuram	Thiruvananthapuram International Airport		
Indonesia	Jakarta	Soekarno–Hatta International Airport		
Iran	Mashhad	Mashhad International Airport	Terminated	
Iran	Shiraz	Shiraz Shahid Dastgheib International Airport	Terminated	
Iran	Tehran	Tehran Imam Khomeini International Airport	Terminated	
Iraq	Najaf	Al Najaf International Airport	Terminated	
Italy	Milan	Milan Malpensa Airport		
Italy	Rome	Rome Fiumicino Airport		
Jordan	Amman	Queen Alia International Airport		
Kenya	Nairobi	Jomo Kenyatta International Airport	Terminated	
Kuwait	Kuwait City	Kuwait International Airport		
Lebanon	Beirut	Beirut–Rafic Hariri International Airport	Terminated	
Malaysia	Kuala Lumpur	Kuala Lumpur International Airport		
Maldives	Malé	Velana International Airport		
Morocco	Casablanca	Mohammed V International Airport	Terminated	
Nepal	Kathmandu	Tribhuvan International Airport	Terminated	
Netherlands	Amsterdam	Amsterdam Airport Schiphol		
Oman	Duqm	Duqm Airport		
Oman	Khasab	Khasab Airport		
Oman	Muscat	Muscat International Airport	Hub	
Oman	Salalah	Salalah International Airport		
Pakistan	Gwadar	New Gwadar International Airport	Terminated	
Pakistan	Islamabad	Islamabad International Airport	Terminated	
Pakistan	Karachi	Jinnah International Airport		
Pakistan	Lahore	Allama Iqbal International Airport	Terminated	
Pakistan	Peshawar	Bacha Khan International Airport	Terminated	
Philippines	Manila	Ninoy Aquino International Airport		
Russia	Moscow	Moscow Domodedovo Airport	Terminated	
Russia	Moscow	Sheremetyevo International Airport		
Russia	Sochi	Sochi International Airport		
Russia	Yekaterinburg	Koltsovo International Airport		
Qatar	Doha	Hamad International Airport		
Saudi Arabia	Dammam	King Fahd International Airport		
Saudi Arabia	Jeddah	King Abdulaziz International Airport		
Saudi Arabia	Medina	Prince Mohammad bin Abdulaziz International Airport		
Saudi Arabia	Riyadh	King Khalid International Airport		
Singapore	Singapore	Changi Airport		
Sri Lanka	Colombo	Bandaranaike International Airport	Terminated	
Switzerland	Zürich	Zürich Airport		
Syria	Damascus	Damascus International Airport	Terminated	
Tanzania	Dar es Salaam	Julius Nyerere International Airport		
Tanzania	Zanzibar	Abeid Amani Karume International Airport		
Thailand	Bangkok	Suvarnabhumi Airport		
Thailand	Phuket	Phuket International Airport		
Turkey	Istanbul	Istanbul Airport		
Turkey	Trabzon	Trabzon Airport		
United Arab Emirates	Abu Dhabi	Zayed International Airport		
United Arab Emirates	Al Ain	Al Ain International Airport	Terminated	
United Arab Emirates	Dubai	Dubai International Airport		
United Arab Emirates	Sharjah	Sharjah International Airport	Terminated	
United Kingdom	London	Heathrow Airport		
United Kingdom	Manchester	Manchester Airport	Terminated	
Uzbekistan	Tashkent	Islam Karimov Tashkent International Airport		
Vietnam	Hanoi	Noi Bai International Airport	Terminated	
