= Dalma Airport =

- IATA: ZDY; ICAO: OMDL

Summary
- Airport type: Public
- Operator: Abu Dhabi Airports Company
- Serves: Dalma Island, UAE
- Focus city for: Rotana Jet
- Time zone: UAE Standard Time (UTC+04:00)
- Elevation AMSL: 16 ft / 5 m
- Coordinates: 24°30′11″N 052°20′09″E

Map
- Location in the UAE

Runways
Direction	Length		Surface
Direction	m	ft	Surface
17/35	2,500	8,202	Asphalt
- Sources: Google Earth, Abu Dhabi Airports Company

Dalma Airport (IATA: ZDY, ICAO: OMDL) is a small airport serving Dalma Island, United Arab Emirates. It is capable of handling small and medium size aircraft, most of which shuttle workers and visitors between the island and other cities.

== Airlines and destinations ==
Airlines	Destinations
Abu Dhabi Aviation	Abu Dhabi
Rotana Jet	Abu Dhabi

== Accidents and incidents ==
- On 15 May 1990, a twin engine Piper PA-31-310 Navajo aircraft following a cartography mission over the area crashed short of the runway on landing attempt. All four occupants were killed.
