= Hafarah =

Place in Fujairah, United Arab Emirates

Ahfara
- Location within United Arab Emirates
- Coordinates: 25°2′30″N 56°18′41″E
- Country: United Arab Emirates
- Emirate: Fujairah
- Elevation: 61 m (200 ft)

Ahfara is a settlement in Fujairah, United Arab Emirates, about ten kilometres south of Fujairah International Airport.

The Ahfara village was the subject of an arid land agricultural study in 2004 which mentioned livestock ranching in the area.

12 new homes were built for Emiratis in 2014. Ahfara also has a mosque.
