= Husain Jaafar Almandeel =

Bahraini educator and politician (1931–2008)

Husain Jaafar Al Mandeel
- حسين جعفر المنديل
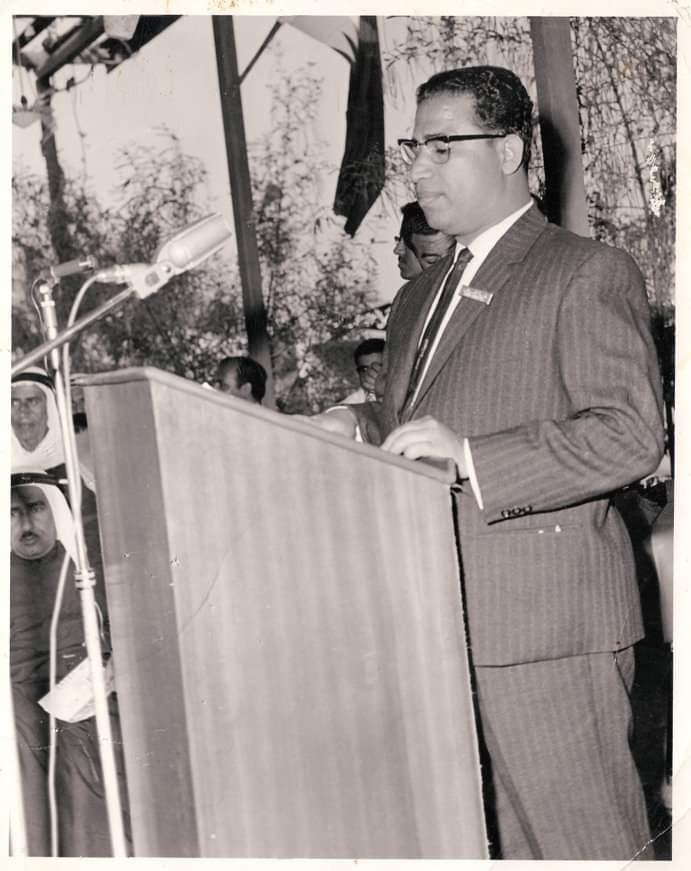
- Husain Al Mandeel speaking at an event in the Al Orooba club.
- Born: 1931; Manama, Bahrain
- Died: May 9, 2008 (aged 77); Bahrain
- Education: American University of Beirut (BA in Arts, Psychology and Education)
- Occupations: Educator, public servant, cultural figure
- Known for: Pioneering media and public relations in Bahrain; Developing archaeology and tourism in the UAE; Founding the Bahrain Automobile and Touring Club
- Spouse: Thuraya Ali Al Radhawi
- Children: 6, including Maha, Hesham, Hani, Yaser, Mohammed, and Ali
- Relatives: Juma Jaafar Al Mandeel (brother)

Husain Jaafar Al Mandeel (Arabic: حسين جعفر المنديل; 1931 – 9 May 2008) was a prominent Bahraini educator, public servant, and political figure. He played a foundational role in the development of education, media, and cultural institutions in both Bahrain and the United Arab Emirates. As one of the first Bahrainis to receive a university degree, he held several key positions, including serving in Bahrain's Public Relations Directorate and later as the Director General of Antiquities and Tourism in the UAE under Sheikh Zayed bin Sultan Al Nahyan. He is also remembered for founding the Bahrain Automobile and Touring Club in 1975.

== Early life and education ==
Husain Jaafar Al Mandeel was born in 1931 in Manama, Bahrain, into a family active in the pearl trade. His father was a tawash (pearl merchant) who conducted business across the Arabian Gulf and with Mumbai, India. He received his primary and intermediate education in local Bahraini schools.

In 1944, at age 13, Al Mandeel was selected as part of the first Bahraini student delegation sent abroad for secondary education, studying in Cairo, Egypt. He went on to attend the American University of Beirut, where he earned a Bachelor of Arts degree in psychology and education, along with a teaching license, in 1953. He was among the first wave of university graduates from Bahrain, alongside notable figures like Yusuf Al Shirawi and Qasim Fakhro.

Later in his career, Al Mandeel traveled to Denmark to study modern education systems, where he authored research papers on technical education in Bahrain, women's education in Saudi Arabia, and the role of media in community development.

== Career ==
Al Mandeel's career spanned several decades and two Gulf nations, marked by significant contributions to public service, culture, and heritage.

=== In Bahrain ===
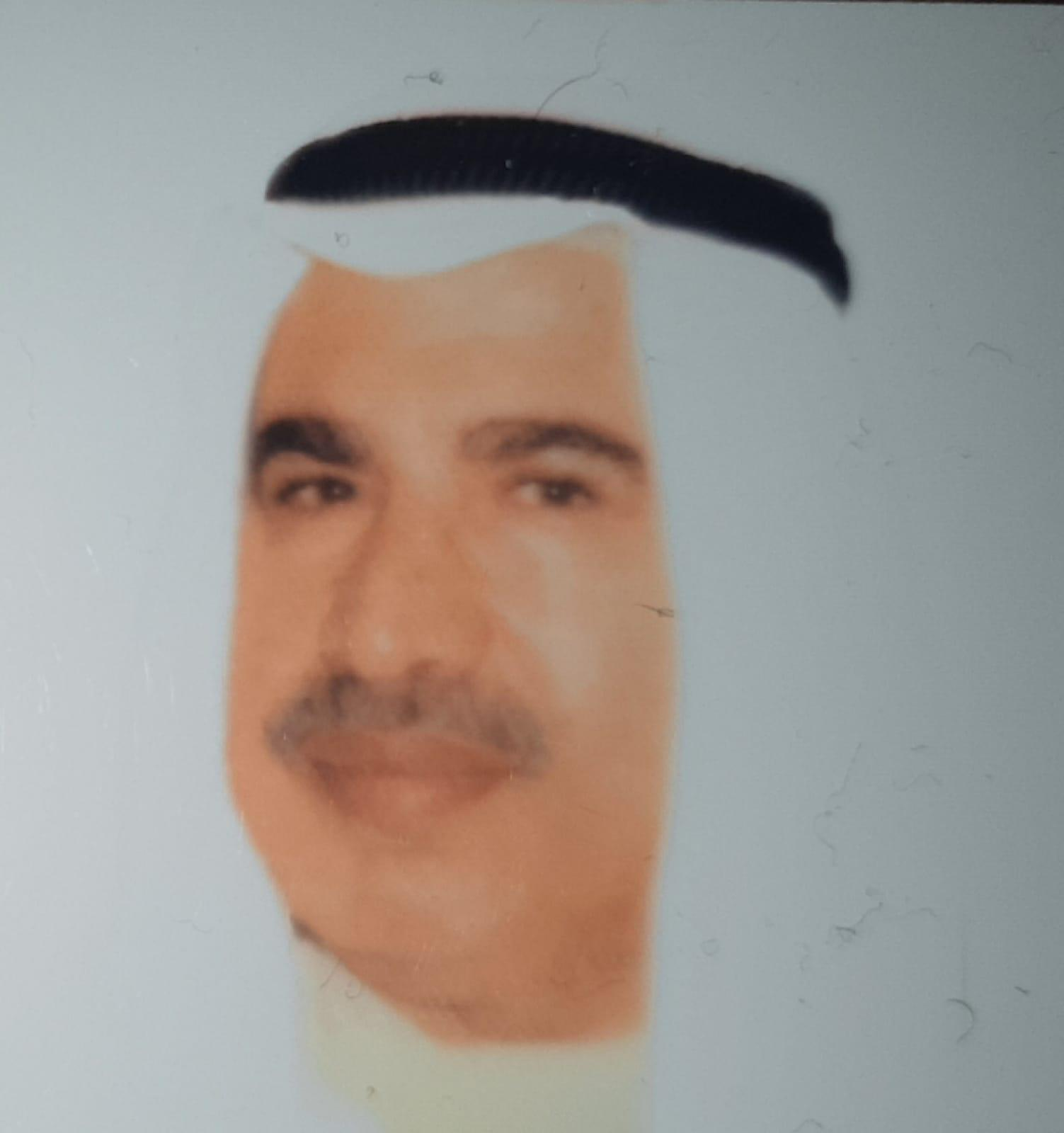
Al Mandeel in his later years

Al Mandeel began his professional life in 1953 as a social studies and English teacher at Manama Secondary School. He soon transitioned to public service, joining the Public Relations and Broadcasting Department as deputy director general under James Belgrave, son of the British advisor Charles Belgrave. In the mid-1960s, he was involved in reorganizing the department, which laid the groundwork for the future Foreign Affairs and Information Departments.

His cultural and civil society involvement was extensive. In 1954, he co-founded the Bahrain History and Antiquities Society and served as its first treasurer. Throughout the late 1950s and mid-1960s, he chaired the organizing committee for the Bahrain Agricultural and Commercial Exhibition.

A prominent figure in the era's Arab nationalist movement, he chaired the board of Al Orooba Club for three terms (1960–1961, 1963, and 1964–1968). In 1961, as president of the Union of National Clubs, he successfully negotiated to increase scholarships for Bahraini students in Iraqi schools and universities to nearly thirty.

=== In the United Arab Emirates ===
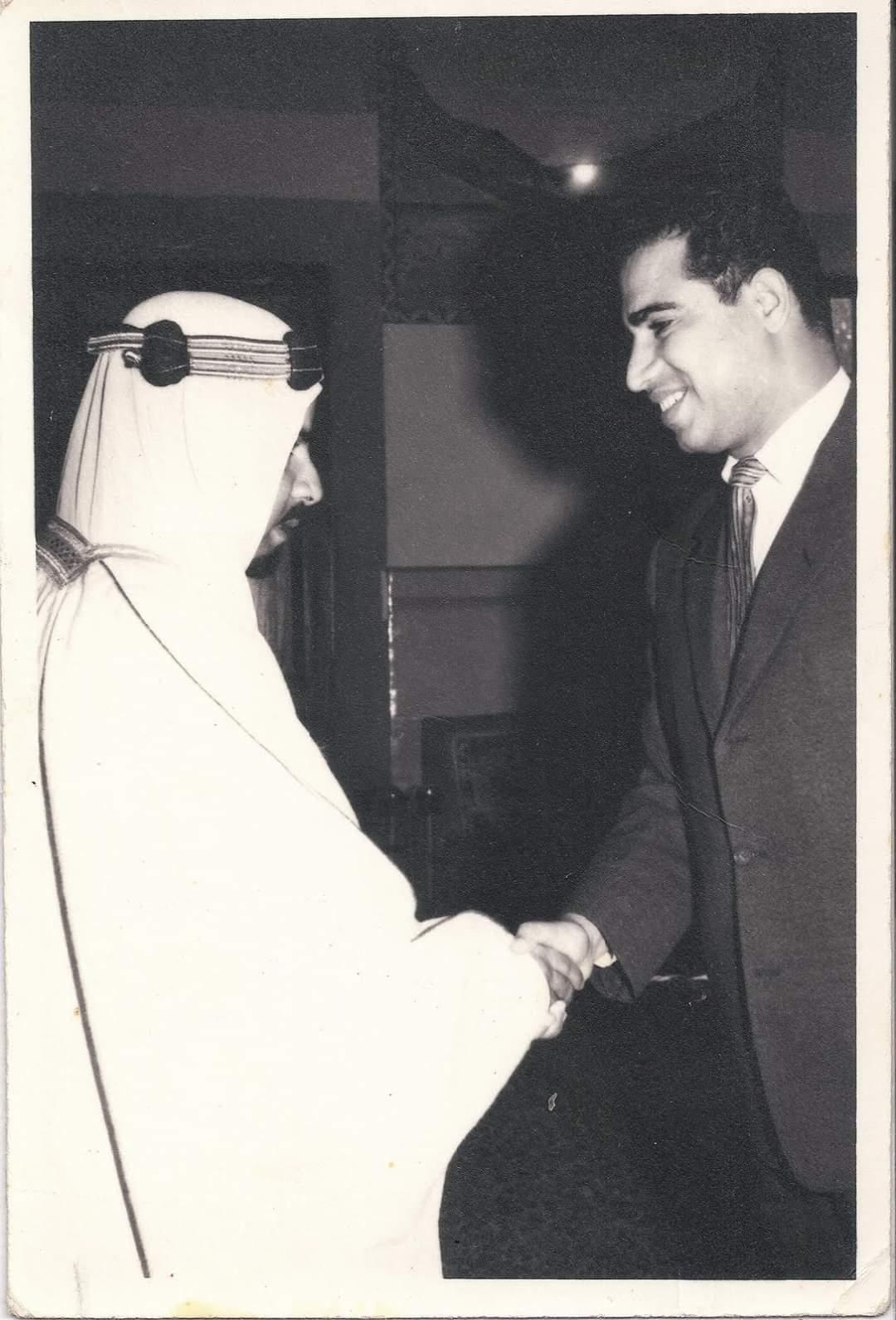
Husain Al Mandeel (right) with Sheikh Isa bin Salman Al Khalifa, the former ruler of Bahrain.

In 1969, Al Mandeel's expertise was sought by Sheikh Zayed bin Sultan Al Nahyan, who appointed him as the first Director General of Antiquities and Tourism for Abu Dhabi, a role he held until 1983. He was instrumental in establishing the foundations of the UAE's cultural heritage infrastructure.

During his tenure, he oversaw the organization of national museums in Abu Dhabi and Al Ain. He collaborated closely with international archaeological missions from Iraq and Denmark, leading to the discovery and preservation of key historical sites, including:

- Jebel Hafeet: Bronze Age tombs revealing ancient trade links.
- Hili Archaeological Park: A Bronze Age settlement with sophisticated irrigation systems.
- Umm an-Nar: An island that was a major center of trade and culture (c. 2800–2200 BC).
- Dalma Island: A settlement with evidence of human activity dating back over 7,000 years.

In 1975, while still serving in the UAE, he founded the Bahrain Automobile and Touring Club, creating an institution to promote tourism and cultural exchange.

== Personal life ==
Al Mandeel was married to Thuraya Radhawi. He had six children: five sons (Mohammed, Hani, Hesham, Yaser, and Ali) and one daughter (Maha). His brother, Juma Jaafar Al Mandeel, was also a well-known educator in Bahrain.

== Death ==
Husain Jaafar Al Mandeel died on 9 May 2008 at the age of 77, after a long illness.
