= Abu Dhabi Airfield =

Former airport of Abu Dhabi, United Arab Emirates (1955–1969)

Abu Dhabi Airfield was the first airport in Abu Dhabi, operating from 1955 to 1969. The original terminal building remains intact, having been preserved in the center of the television and radio complex of Abu Dhabi Media Company, off Muroor Road near the junction with 17th street.

== History ==
Abu Dhabi Airfield مطار أبوظبي
- IATA: none; ICAO: none

Summary
- Airport type: Defunct
- Serves: Abu Dhabi
- Location: Abu Dhabi Island
- Opened: 1955
- Closed: 1969
- Focus city for: Gulf Aviation
- Interactive map of Abu Dhabi Airfield

Runways
Direction	Length		Surface
Direction	ft	m	Surface
	3,000	914	~~Sand~~

The history of aviation in Abu Dhabi began in 1955, when a 3,000-foot sand runway was built, along with a tiny sandstone terminal. When the airport opened, there was no control tower and air traffic controllers had to peak their head through a window to see if the runway was clear for landing or takeoff. A small wind turbine was next to the terminal in order to cool down the interior of the building. The first flights were operated by the local airline Gulf Aviation, which flew seven-seater De Havilland Doves and larger De Havilland Herons from Doha Airport. These aircraft would use the airport as a stopover en route to nearby Sharjah. In its first years, there was only one flight weekly in each direction. There were no runway lights, so flights could be made only during the day; however, on some occasions, there were night operations. Also, during the winter months, it occasionally rains and puts the airport out of operations. All these inconveniences gave the airfield a bad reputation among pilots and passengers.

In 1960, Gulf Aviation expanded its route network to Bahrain, Kuwait, Dhahran, and Muscat. The following year services were started to Dubai. In 1963, a small parking lot was added along with a terminal extension to accommodate added airport services. Several other extensions were made in the following 2 years, such as a smaller building built alongside the original terminal to deal with a more airport services. The parking lot was so extended too. In 1966, Fokker F27 Friendships replaced the De Havilland Doves and De Havilland Herons that regularly operated at the airport. These newly introduced aircraft created a massive boom and it quickly grew saturated. By 1967, the local government began a project with the British to build a massive new airport, with a runway longer than the runways at London Heathrow Airport. During this time, the British airline British Overseas Airways Corporations showed interest in beginning operations to the airfield. This led to the construction of a massive new terminal was able to handle both airlines. B.O.A.C. began flights from Abu Dhabi to London using Bristol Britannia by the beginning of 1968. At this time, the new terminal had opened and had replaced the old terminal. This new terminal did not help as the new route to London quickly grew popular and the air terminal became saturated in a matter of months. Construction had already started on the new airport and was expected to open in 1970. However, the new airport opened early in 1969 and was named Abu Dhabi International Airport (known today as Al Bateen Executive Airport), and it became the main airport of Abu Dhabi and the emirate in general. All operations were relocated on its opening day and the old facility was abandoned.

== Historical airlines and destinations ==
Airline	
B.O.A.C.	London–Heathrow
Gulf Aviation	Bahrain, Dhahran, Doha, Dubai, Kuwait, Muscat, Sharjah
