= Abu Dhabi Airports =

Company in Abu Dhabi

Abu Dhabi Airports (ADA) is public joint-stock company and part of ADQ, one of the region's largest holding companies, established in 2006 to spearhead the development of the aviation infrastructure and aviation-related services at the Emirate of Abu Dhabi's airports.

The airports it is responsible for include Zayed International Airport, Al Ain International Airport, Al Bateen Executive Airport, Dalma Airport and Sir Bani Yas Airport.

== See also ==
- Abu Dhabi Developmental Holding Company
