= Sir Bani Yas Airport =

Sir Bani Yas Airport Yas Airport
- IATA: XSB; ICAO: OMBY

Summary
- Airport type: Public
- Serves: Sir Bani Yas Island
- Focus city for: Rotana Jet
- Elevation AMSL: 10 ft (3.0 m)
- Coordinates: 24°17′00″N 52°35′00″E

Map
- Location of the airport in United Arab Emirates

Runways
Direction	Length		Surface
Direction	ft	m	Surface
13/31	8,760	2,670	Asphalt
- Source: Google Maps

Sir Bani Yas Airport (IATA: XSB, ICAO: OMBY) is an airport serving Sir Bani Yas Island in the United Arab Emirates. It has a single paved runway, not lighted, and 8,760’ long.

Sir Bani Yas Airport began operating in 2008 and primarily serves tourists visiting the island. The airport is located 250 kilometres southwest of the coast of Abu Dhabi in the Western Region.

== Airlines and destinations ==
Airlines	Destinations
Rotana Jet	Abu Dhabi

|Falcon Aviation Services|Abu Dhabi }}

|Empire Aviation Group|Abu Dhabi }}

== See also ==
- Transport in the United Arab Emirates
