= Fujairah International Airport =

Fujairah International Airport مطار الفجيرة الدولي
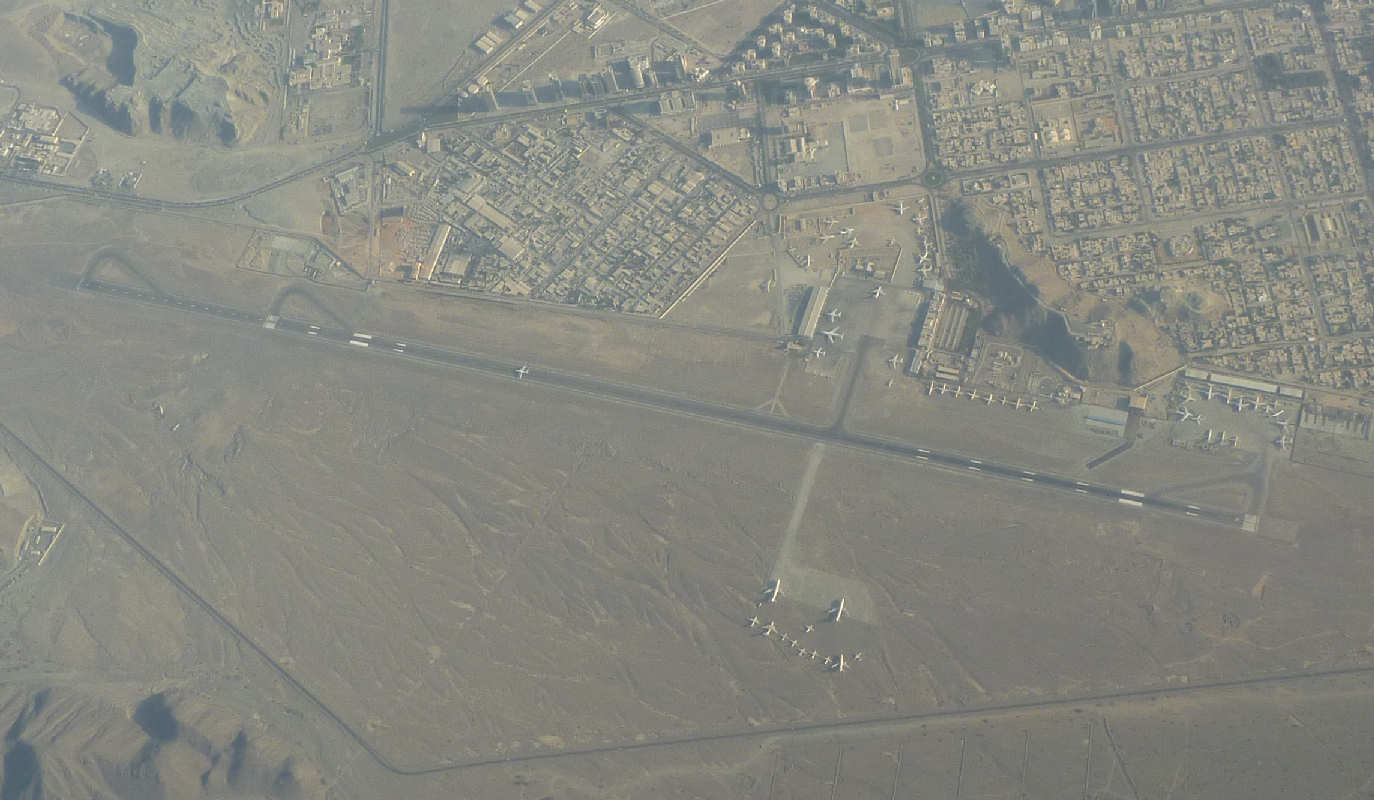
- IATA: FJR; ICAO: OMFJ

Summary
- Airport type: Public
- Operator: Department of Civil Aviation
- Location: Fujairah City, Emirate of Fujairah, UAE
- Time zone: UAE Standard Time (UTC+04:00)
- Elevation AMSL: 153 ft (47 m)
- Coordinates: 25°06′44″N 056°19′27″E

Map
- Location in the UAE OMFJ (Indian Ocean) OMFJ (Middle East) OMFJ (West and Central Asia) OMFJ (Asia)

Runways
Direction	Length		Surface
Direction	m	ft	Surface
11/29	3,749	12,300	Asphalt
- Sources: UAE AIP

Fujairah International Airport (Arabic: مطار الفجيرة الدولي) (IATA: FJR, ICAO: OMFJ) is an international airport located 1 nautical mile (1.9 km; 1.2 mi) south of central Fujairah City. The airport has one terminal serving both passengers and cargo and is home to the Fujairah Aviation Academy.

== History ==
Fujairah airport commenced operations in October 1987. The airport has since undergone major redevelopment with a memorandum of cooperation with Abu Dhabi Airports being signed in 2014 initiating a masterplan for future developments regarding both airfield infrastructure and the passenger terminal. Following recent upgrades the passenger terminal now has the capacity to handle 2 million passengers annually. Fujairah Airport mainly attracts the tourists from the GCC (Gulf Cooperation Council) countries and also has a cargo terminal, and offers aircraft dismantling and maintenance.

== New runway ==
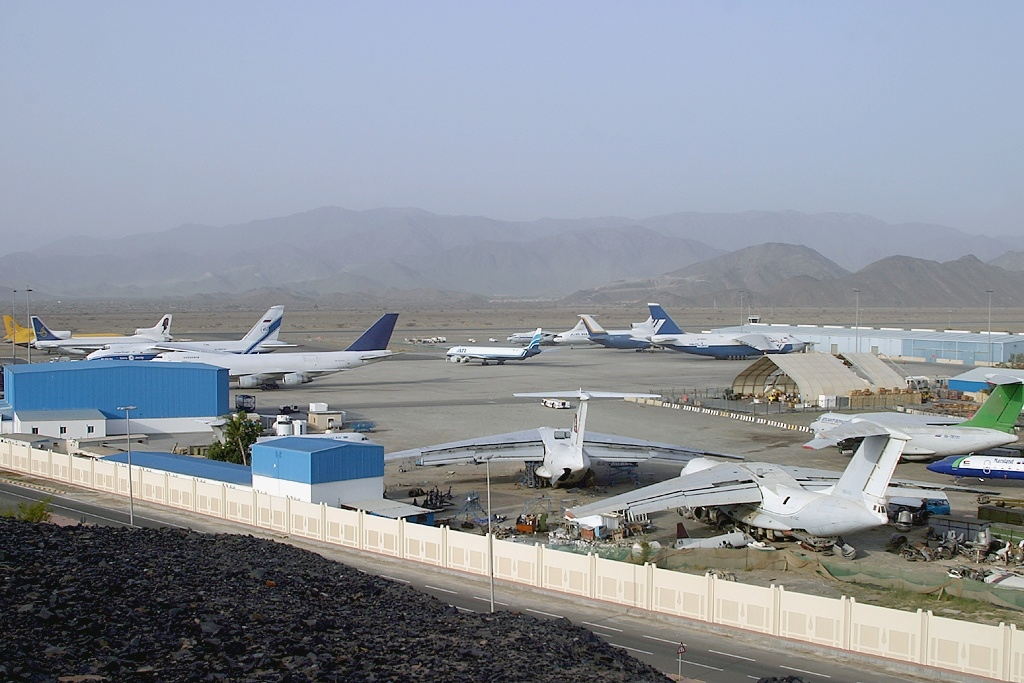
Fujairah International Airport

On 3 December 2022, Fujairah Airport opened a new runway which is more than 3km long and 45m wide.

== Airlines and destinations ==
The following airlines operate regular scheduled, charter and cargo flights to and from Fujairah Airport:

=== Passenger ===
Airlines	Destinations
IndiGo	Kannur, Kochi (begins 26 October 2026), Mumbai
SpiceJet	Seasonal: Kochi Kozhikode
