= New Gwadar International Airport =

International airport in Gwadar, Balochistan, Pakistan

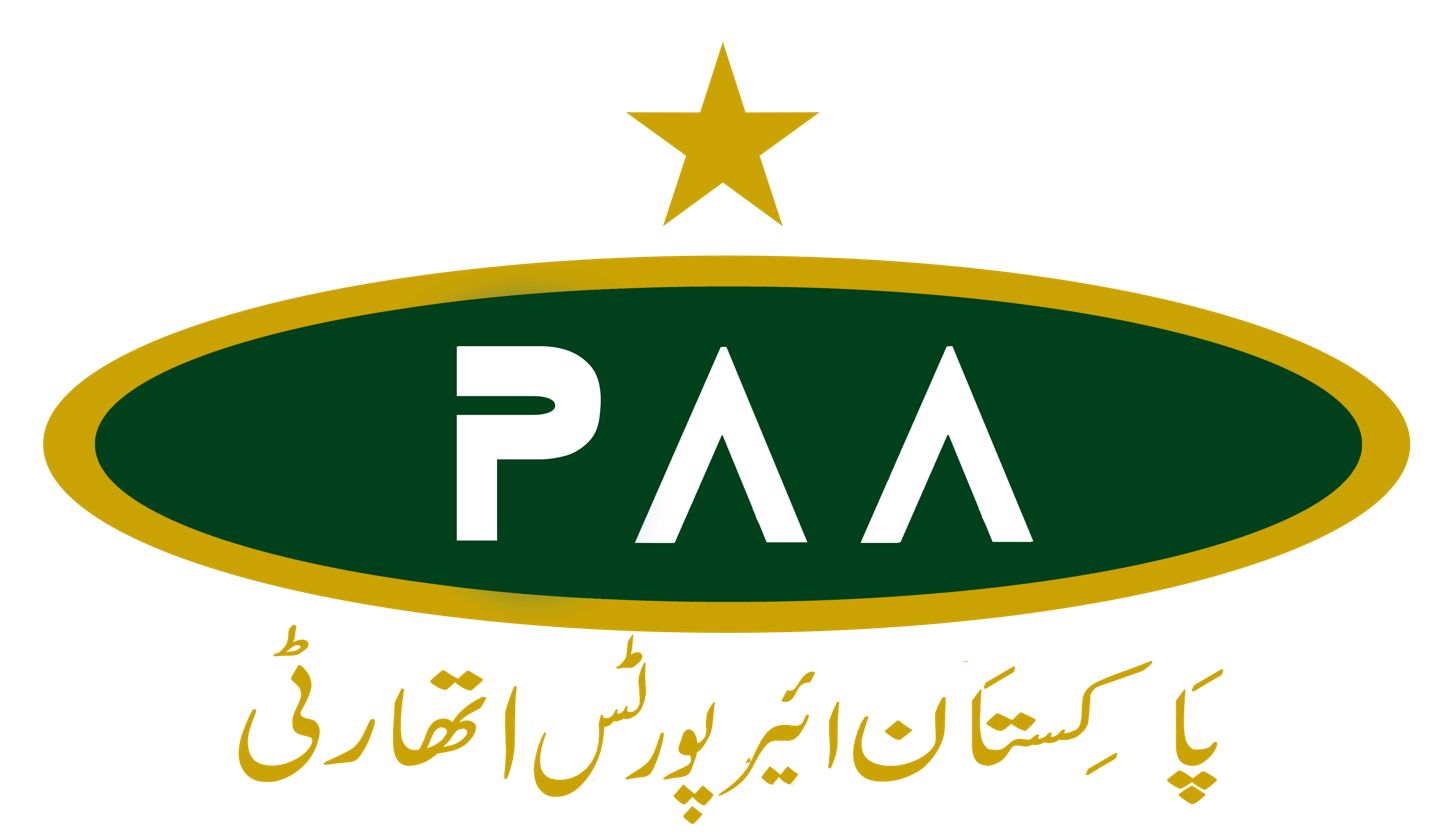
New Gwadar International Airport نیو گوادر بین الاقوامی ہوائی اڈا
- IATA: GWD; ICAO: OPGW

Summary
- Airport type: Public
- Owner: Government of Pakistan Aviation Division
- Operator: Pakistan Airports Authority
- Serves: Gwadar
- Location: Gwadar, Balochistan, Pakistan
- Opened: 14 October 2024; 2 years ago
- Built: 2019–2024
- Elevation AMSL: 64 ft (20 m)
- Coordinates: 25°17′48″N 62°29′55″E
- Website: paa.gov.pk/airport/gwadar
- Interactive map of New Gwadar International Airport

Runways
Direction	Length		Surface
Direction	ft	m	Surface
07/25	12,000	3,658	Concrete
- Sources: PAA AIP, Quetta

New Gwadar International Airport (NGIA) is an airport in Gwadar, Balochistan. It is the largest airport in Pakistan by area, occupying 17 km^{2} of land, the second greenfield airport in Pakistan after Islamabad International Airport. Located in Gorandani, 26 kilometres (16 mi) north-east of the former Gwadar International Airport on the south-western Arabian Sea coast of Balochistan, NGIA was constructed at a cost of Rs66 billion (approximately US$237 million at 2025 exchange rates), funded primarily as a grant by China, with participation from Pakistan and Oman.

The airport was formally inaugurated on 14 October 2024 by Prime Minister Shehbaz Sharif and Chinese Premier Li Qiang as a flagship project of the China-Pakistan Economic Corridor (CPEC). Commercial operations commenced on 20 January 2025, replacing the old airport. With a runway spanning 3,658 m (12,001 ft) in length and 45 m (148 ft) in width, NGIA is capable of accommodating wide-body aircraft including the Airbus A380 and Boeing 747-8.

Ownership of the airport is shared among Pakistan, Oman, and China, and the facility is designed to accommodate both domestic and international flights. Both the need for a new airport and its $240 million price tag have been questioned, given that Gwadar is a small city of only 90,000 people and the old Gwadar airport operated only three flights per week. As of February 2025, after the closure of the old airport, the airport operates five flights per week.

== History ==
The airport project was launched as a high-priority initiative within the China-Pakistan Economic Corridor (CPEC) programme in 2014. The Pakistan Civil Aviation Authority awarded the design-and-build contract to the China Communications Construction Company (CCCC). Former Prime Minister Imran Khan laid the foundation stone on 29 March 2019. The airport includes a modern terminal building alongside a cargo terminal with refrigeration facilities for perishable goods and an initial handling capacity of 30,000 tonnes per year. NGIA has the capacity to accommodate wide-body aircraft including the Airbus A380 and Boeing 747-8, and narrow-body aircraft such as the ATR 72 and Boeing 737-900ER.

On 1 August 2023, the National Assembly of Pakistan passed a resolution calling for the renaming of the airport as Feroz Khan Noon Airport, in honour of Pakistan's seventh prime minister, Feroz Khan Noon, who played an instrumental role in securing Gwadar for Pakistan through an agreement with the Sultanate of Oman. The resolution was one of three passed by the house that day. As of June 2026, the airport continues to operate under its original name.

The airport was inaugurated on 14 October 2024 in a ceremony led by Prime Minister Shehbaz Sharif and Chinese Premier Li Qiang. The opening had initially been planned for 14 August 2024, to coincide with Pakistan's Independence Day celebrations, but was delayed due to protests organised by the Baloch Yakjehti Committee (BYC).

The airport's first international flight departed on 10 January 2025, ahead of full commercial launch, operating a service to Muscat, the capital of Oman. The service had originally been scheduled for 1 January 2025 but was delayed due to Balochistan Liberation Army (BLA) activity in the region.

Commercial operations commenced on 20 January 2025 when PIA flight PK-503 from Karachi, carrying 46 passengers, landed at 11:10am. Defence Minister Khawaja Asif and Balochistan Chief Minister Sarfraz Bugti received the passengers at a ceremony at the airport. The flight had departed Karachi at 9:50am and was greeted with a water cannon salute on arrival.

In late January 2025, an Airbus A319 registered as A6-RRJ, operated by Rotana Jet as a special charter on behalf of the United Arab Emirates, landed at runway 25, becoming the first Airbus aircraft to use the airport.

On 3 December 2025, the Pakistan Airports Authority began construction of an air-cargo building at the airport to manage containerised and oversized cargo.

== Runway ==
The airport has a single runway with a length of 3,658 m (12,001 ft) and a width of 45 m (148 ft), capable of accommodating wide-bodied aircraft. A taxiway of 23 m (75 ft) runs alongside paved shoulders of 10.5 m (34 ft) on both sides.

== Construction ==
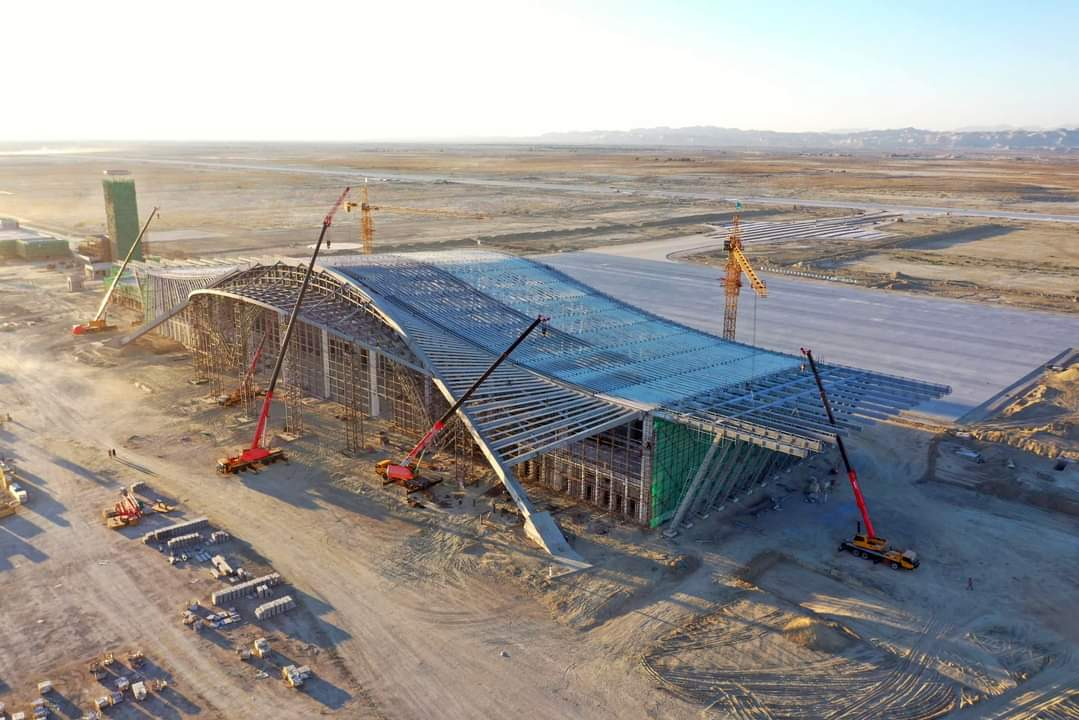
The airport under construction in 2022.

The New Gwadar International Airport was constructed at a cost of Rs66 billion (approximately US$237 million at 2025 exchange rates), funded primarily (67%) as a grant by China, with participation from Pakistan and Oman.

== Airlines and destinations ==
Airlines	Destinations
Pakistan International Airlines	Karachi
Rotana Jet	Charter: Dubai-Al Maktoum
South Air	Karachi, Quetta
