= Gwadar International Airport =

Airport in Pakistan

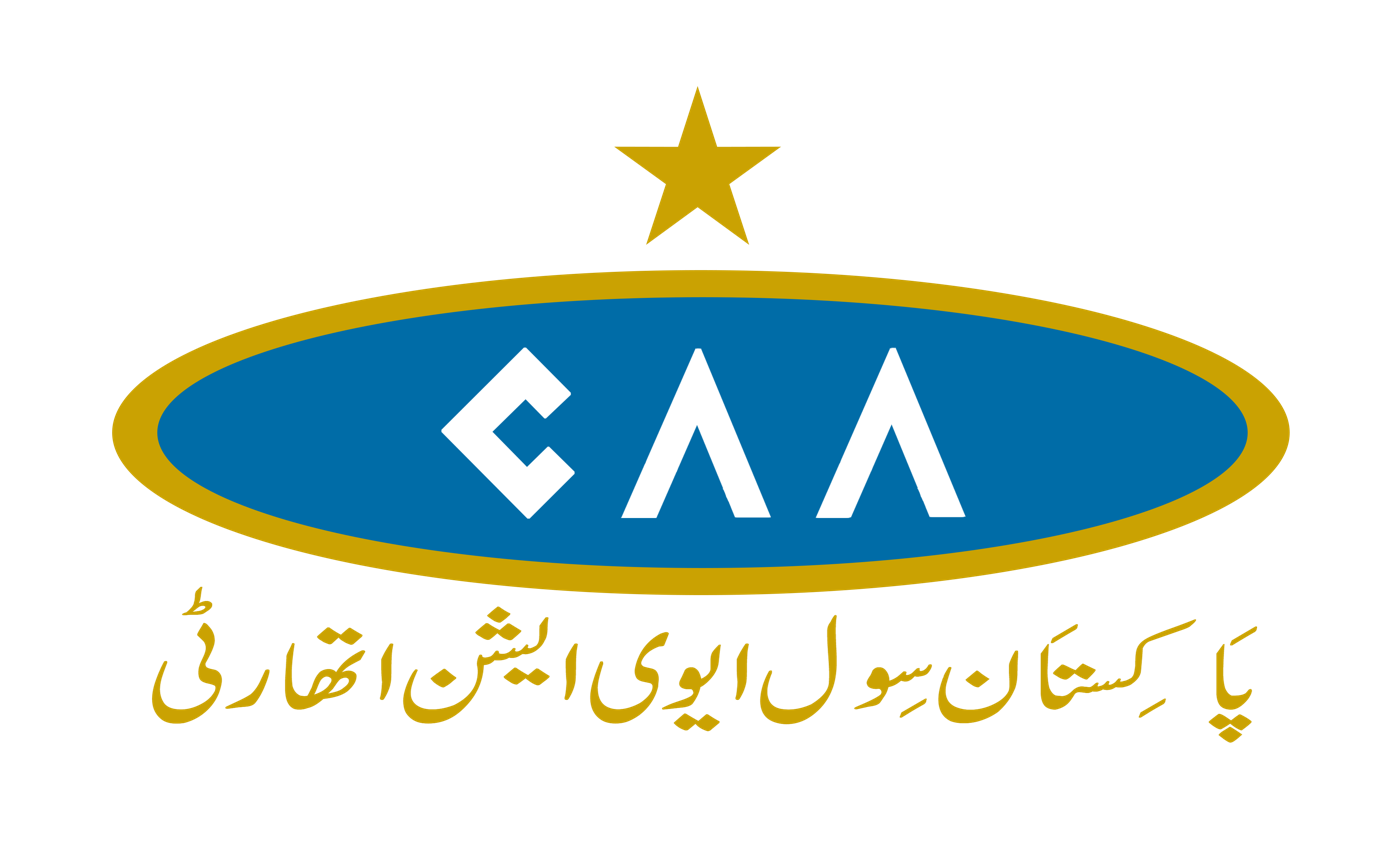
Gwadar International Airport گوادر بین الاقوامی ہوائی اڈا
- IATA: none; ICAO: OPGD

Summary
- Airport type: Joint-use airport
- Owner: GoP Aviation Division
- Operator: Pakistan Airports Authority (formerly)
- Serves: Gwadar
- Location: Gwadar Tehsil, Makran Division, Balochistan, Pakistan
- Opened: 1966; 60 years ago
- Closed: January 20, 2025; 19 months ago
- Elevation AMSL: 32 ft (9.8 m)
- Coordinates: 25°13′56″N 62°19′38″E
- Website: caapakistan.com.pk

Map
- Location of airport in Pakistan OPGD (Pakistan) OPGD (South Asia)

Runways
Direction	Length		Surface
Direction	ft	m	Surface
06/24	6,502	1,982	Bitumen
- Sources: CAA AIP

Gwadar International Airport (GIA) (ICAO: OPGD, GPS code: 25°13′56″N 62°19′38″E) was an airport in the Makran Division of Pakistan's Balochistan province, located 9 mi (14 km) north of the city center of Gwadar City. The airport was closed to civil air traffic in 2025, after the construction of the modern New Gwadar International Airport.

== History ==
The town of Gwadar was purchased by Government of Pakistan from Sultan of Muscat in 1958. Air operations started in 1966. It was given international status when two weekly international flights from Karachi-Gwadar-Muscat were initiated. The terminal building was inaugurated in 1984 and the newly constructed Departure/VIP Lounges were inaugurated in 2008.

In 2024, Gwadar International was replaced with a more modern and larger airport i.e- The New Gwadar International Airport. The airport was closed to civilian air traffic on 20 January 2025 after the PAA issued a formal NOTAM. The airport’s IATA code, GWD, was transferred to the new airport while the ICAO code, OPGD, was retained.
