= Dalma Island =

Dalma Island جزيرة دلما (Arabic)
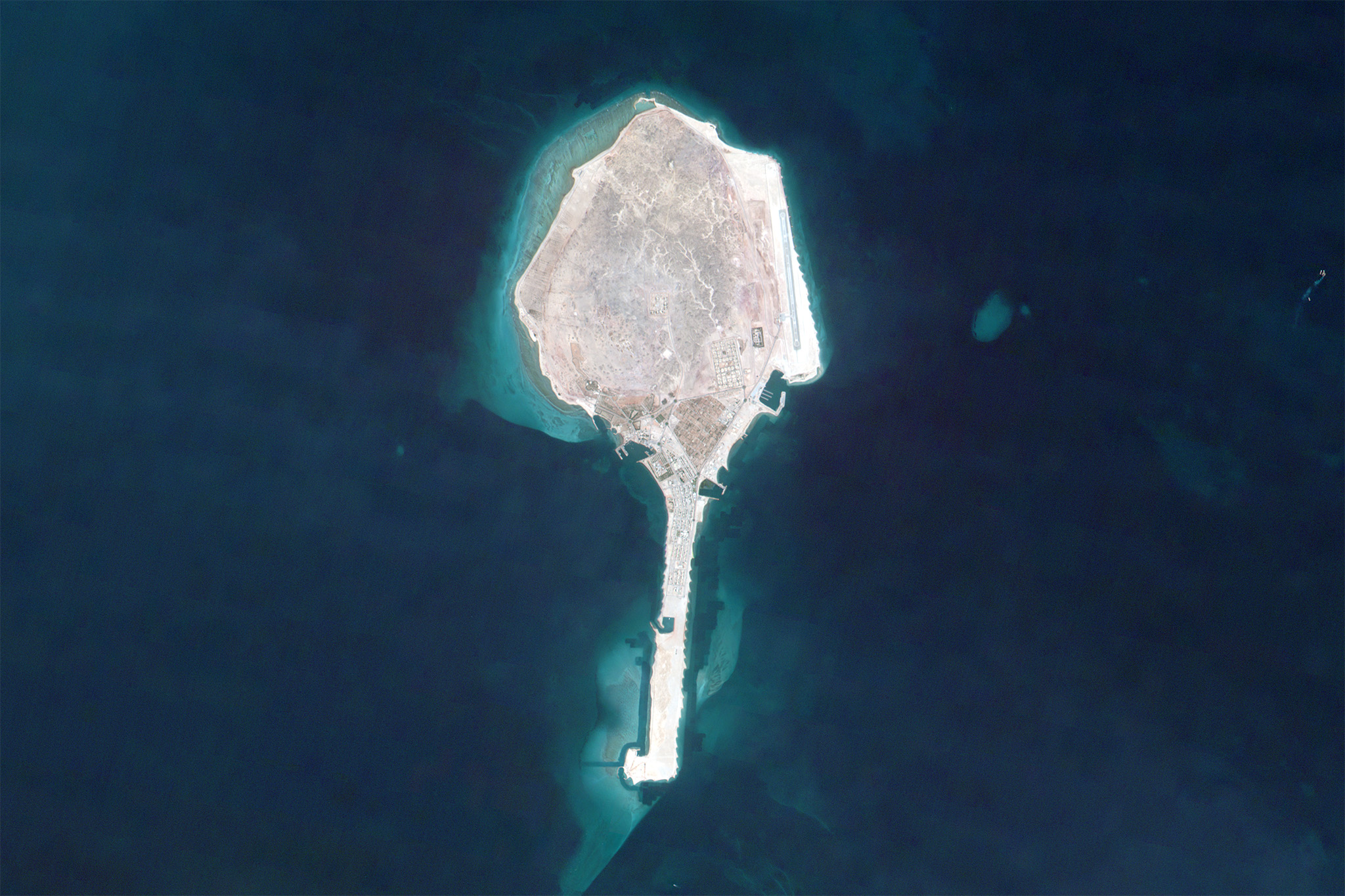
- Satellite view of Dalma in 2016

- Location in United Arab Emirates Dalma Island (Persian Gulf)
- Coordinates: 24°31′N 52°19′E
- Country: United Arab Emirates
- Emirate: Abu Dhabi
- Municipal Region: Al Dhafra

Population (2000)
  - Total: ~5,000

Dalma Island (Arabic: جزيرة دلما, also spelled Delma) is an Emirati island located in the Persian Gulf, approximately 42 kilometres (26 mi) off the coast of the Emirate of Abu Dhabi. It had a population of approximately 5,000 in the 2000 census.

== Description ==
In the 1898 fourth edition of Persian Gulf Pilot, the island is described as:

... about 5 miles [8 km] long North and South by 2½ miles [4 km] broad; it is generally hilly, but towards the southern part falls away to a very low narrow plain 1½ miles [2.4 km] long, which terminates in a point. The hills at a distance appear like a long table hill, with a small barn-shaped peak near the north end ; this is 244 feet [74 m] high, and visible 18 miles [29 km]. A reef round the island extends a quarter to half a mile [0.4 to 0.8 km] off shore, except at the South point.

A 2020 book states, "The central part of the island comprises the rocky core of a salt dome, attaining a height of almost 100 m [330 feet] above sea level." It also notes that "The shoreline of the island has changed considerably during the past few decades with significant infilling of the southern and eastern coasts".

Throughout the centuries, it was a stopping place for sailing ships to replenish their water supplies. In 1998, there were as many as 200 wells, some producing sweet, others brackish water.

== Accessibility ==
The island is served by Dalma Airport, with nearly daily, unscheduled flights from Zayed International Airport in Abu Dhabi, and a mainland ferry from Jebel Dhanna.

== Pearls ==
For centuries, Dalma Island was noted for providing a marketplace for the pearl trade.

== Archaeology ==
The Abu Dhabi Islands Archaeological Survey carried out an initial survey of Dalma island in 1992. More than 20 archaeological sites were identified on the island, ranging in time from the Neolithic (late Stone Age), including a Neolithic settlement extending 250 metres (820 ft) north-south by 175 metres (574 ft) east-west, with radiocarbon dating indicating it was occupied from the mid-sixth to the mid-fifth millennium BC.
