= Gulf Aviation =

Middle eastern airline

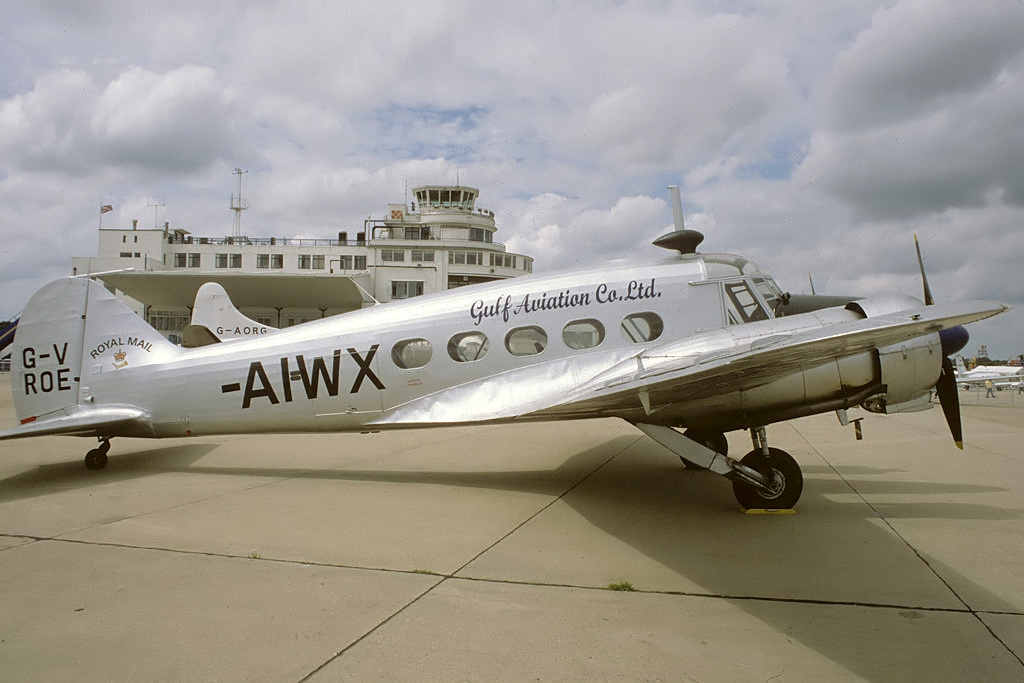
- Avro 652A Anson of Gulf Aviation
IATA	ICAO	Call sign
GF	GFA	GULF AVIATION
- Founded: 1949
- Commenced operations: 1950
- Ceased operations: 1973 (to Gulf Air)
- Fleet size: 30 (total aircraft operated throughout history, and 1 VC 10 operated by BOAC)

Gulf Aviation was a Bahrain-based charter and scheduled airline that evolved into Gulf Air. Its formal incorporation in 1950 was followed by constant change as the Persian Gulf economies developed. The airline operation became a subsidiary company branded as Gulf Air on 1 January 1974.

== History ==
Gulf Aviation Company was established in Bahrain in 1949. The founder was a former RAF pilot, Freddie Bosworth. Bosworth's original business plan was based on establishing scheduled feeder and cabotage services between some of the Arab States of the Persian Gulf, alongside charter/air taxi services, aircraft handling services and flying training services. Scheduled operations based in Bahrain commenced on 5 July 1950 to Doha (Qatar) and Sharjah (Trucial States, latterly UAE) and on 28 September 1950 to Dhahran (Saudi Arabia). The original fleet comprised several Ansons and, briefly, a de Havilland DH.86B Express. The de Havilland Dove was selected to replace these, but Bosworth was killed on a demonstration flight at Croydon on 9 June 1951 whilst preparing to introduce the type into service.

During the course of the 1950s de Havilland DH.114 Heron and Douglas C-47/Dakota aircraft joined the fleet. (Note: C-47/Dakota aircraft converted for airline use are often referred to as DC-3 aircraft.)

In 1967 the airline introduced Fokker F27 aircraft and so was able to operate current generation scheduled services with pressurised, air conditioned aircraft and cabin service. Soon after these were augmented by BAC One-Elevens, although both types were only operated in limited numbers over a limited route network. The Heron aircraft were replaced with Beechcraft B80 Queen Airs. Operations ceased on 31 December 1973 with the foundation of Gulf Air.

== Ownership and subsidiary companies ==
Gulf Aviation was established as a limited company on 24 March 1950. Following the death of Bosworth in 1951, BOAC took a shareholding through its subsidiary BOAC Associated Companies.

=== Subsidiary companies ===
Gulf Helicopters was established in February 1973. Gulf Aviation held 74% of the shares with British Airways Helicopters holding the remaining 26%.

== Aircraft operated ==
Type	Number	In service date	Out of service date (if before 31 Dec 1973)	Notes
Avro Anson	2	1950	1952	Replaced by De Havilland Dove
de Havilland DH.86B Express	1	April 1951	August 1951	Replaced by De Havilland Dove
de Havilland Dove	4	1956	1964	
de Havilland Heron	5	1956	1967	Replaced on PDO contract by Beech B80
Beechcraft Queen Air B80	2	January 1967	(to Gulf Air)	Replacements for DH Heron. 5-year contract to support PDO operations in Oman.
Shorts Skyvan	4	1971	(to Gulf Air)	
Britten-Norman Islander	2	December 1971	(to Gulf Air)	
Douglas C-47/Dakota	5	1960	1971	Identified as 'DC-3' in timetables
Fokker F27-200/400 Friendship	3	January 1967	(to Gulf Air)	
BAC One-Eleven 400	2	November 1969	(to Gulf Air)	
Vickers VC10-1101	1	1 April 1970	31 December 1973	Operated by BOAC on twice-weekly service to London.

== Accidents and incidents ==
- On 19 February 1958, a Gulf Aviation de Havilland Heron (registered G-APJS) crashed into a hill in Italy during bad weather conditions. The aircraft had been on a ferry flight from Athens to Rome with three crew members on board, all of which were killed.
- On 10 July 1960, the thirteen passengers and three crew on board a Gulf Aviation Douglas C-47 (registered VT-DGS) died when the aircraft was lost during a flight from Doha to Sharjah. As the wreckage could not be located, the cause for this worst accident in the history of the airline could not be determined.
- On 17 August 1966, a Gulf Aviation C-47 (registered G-AOFZ) crashed after take-off from Muscat/Azaiba aerodrome due to an operating error. The aircraft was unable to climb or maintain altitude after takeoff due to lack of engine power on the port engine, and crashed 560 yds from the end of the departure runway (rwy 06.) All 20 people on board (18 passengers and two crew) survived the accident.
