= Zayed International Airport =

International airport serving Abu Dhabi, United Arab Emirates

Zayed International Airport مطار زايد الدولي

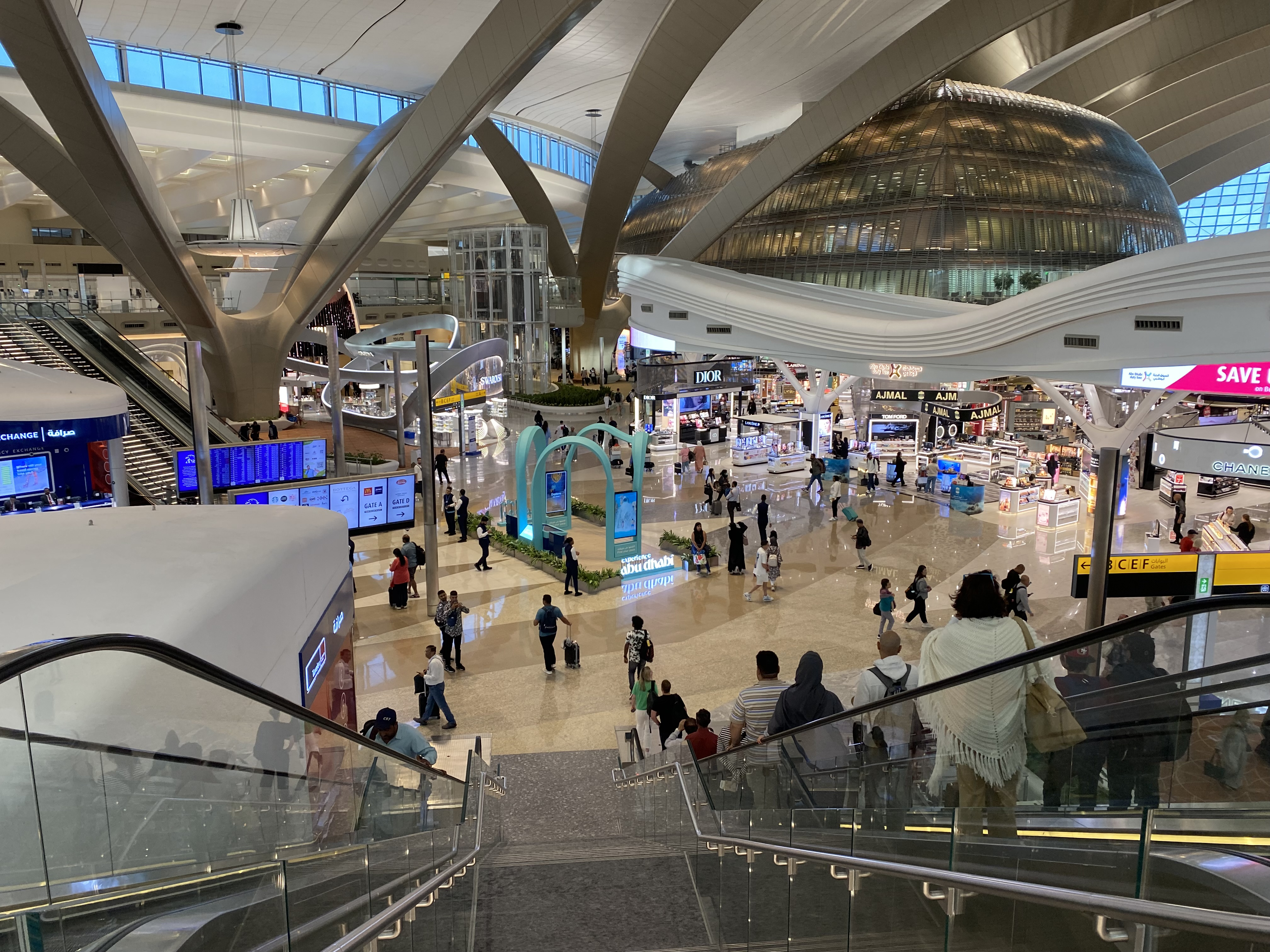
- IATA: AUH; ICAO: OMAA; WMO: 41217

Summary
- Airport type: Public
- Owner/Operator: Abu Dhabi Airports Company
- Serves: Abu Dhabi
- Location: Abu Dhabi
- Opened: 2 January 1982; 44 years ago
- Hub for: Etihad Airways; Etihad Cargo
- Operating base for: Air Arabia Abu Dhabi
- Time zone: UAE Standard Time (UTC+04:00)
- Elevation AMSL: 88 ft (27 m)
- Coordinates: 24°25′59″N 054°39′04″E
- Website: zayedinternationalairport.ae

Maps
- Location in the UAE AUH/OMAA (Persian Gulf) AUH/OMAA (Middle East) AUH/OMAA (Asia)
- Interactive map of Zayed International Airport

Runways
Direction	Length		Surface
Direction	m	ft	Surface
13R/31L	4,205	13,796	Asphalt
13L/31R	4,205	13,796	Asphalt

Statistics (2024)
- Passenger movements: 29,474,493 (▲28.1%)
- Aircraft movements: 249,747 (▲10.33%)
- Cargo tonnage: 678,990 (▲21%)
- Source: Abu Dhabi Airports Company

Zayed International Airport (Arabic: مطار زايد الدولي; IATA: AUH, ICAO: OMAA), also known as Abu Dhabi International Airport, is the primary international airport serving Abu Dhabi, the capital of the United Arab Emirates (UAE). It is the second busiest airport in the UAE after Dubai International Airport, one of the busiest airports in the Middle East and is the hub for Etihad Airways as well as an operating base for Air Arabia Abu Dhabi.

The airport is located 16.5 nautical miles (30.6 km; 19.0 mi) east of Abu Dhabi, and covers an area of 15,000 acres (6,000 ha). The airport is served by 24 airlines which fly to 128 destinations. The airport was renamed to Zayed International Airport on 9 February 2024 after Sheikh Zayed bin Sultan Al Nahyan, the UAE's founding father and first President.

== History ==
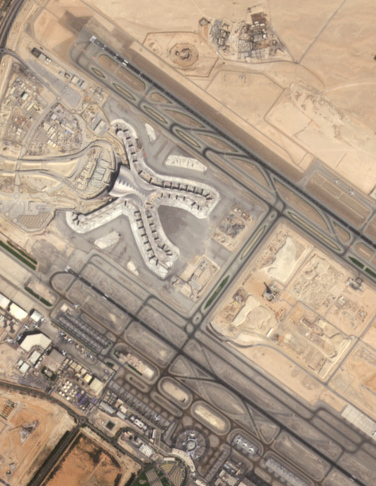
Satellite image of the airport in 2019

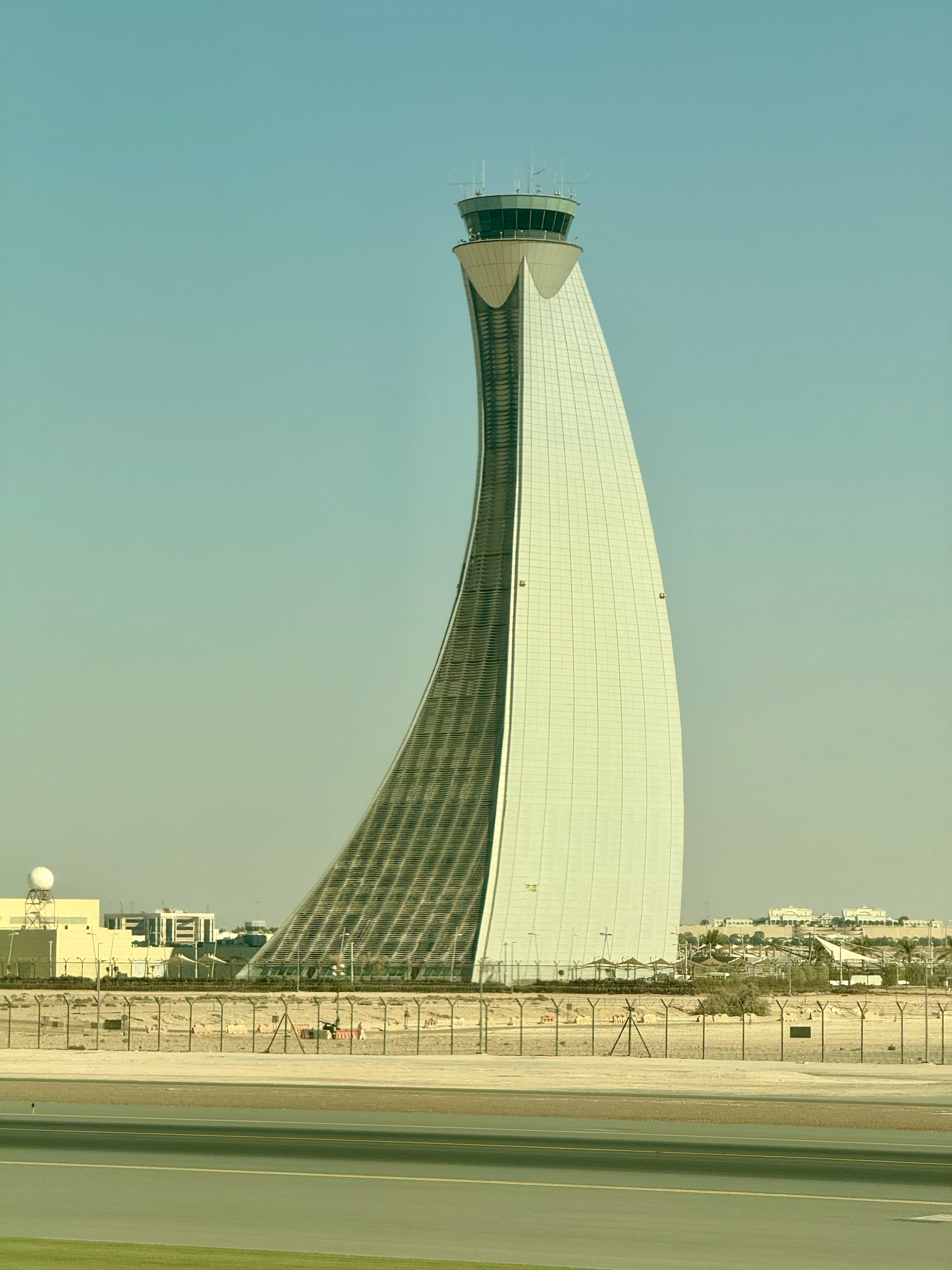
Air traffic control tower

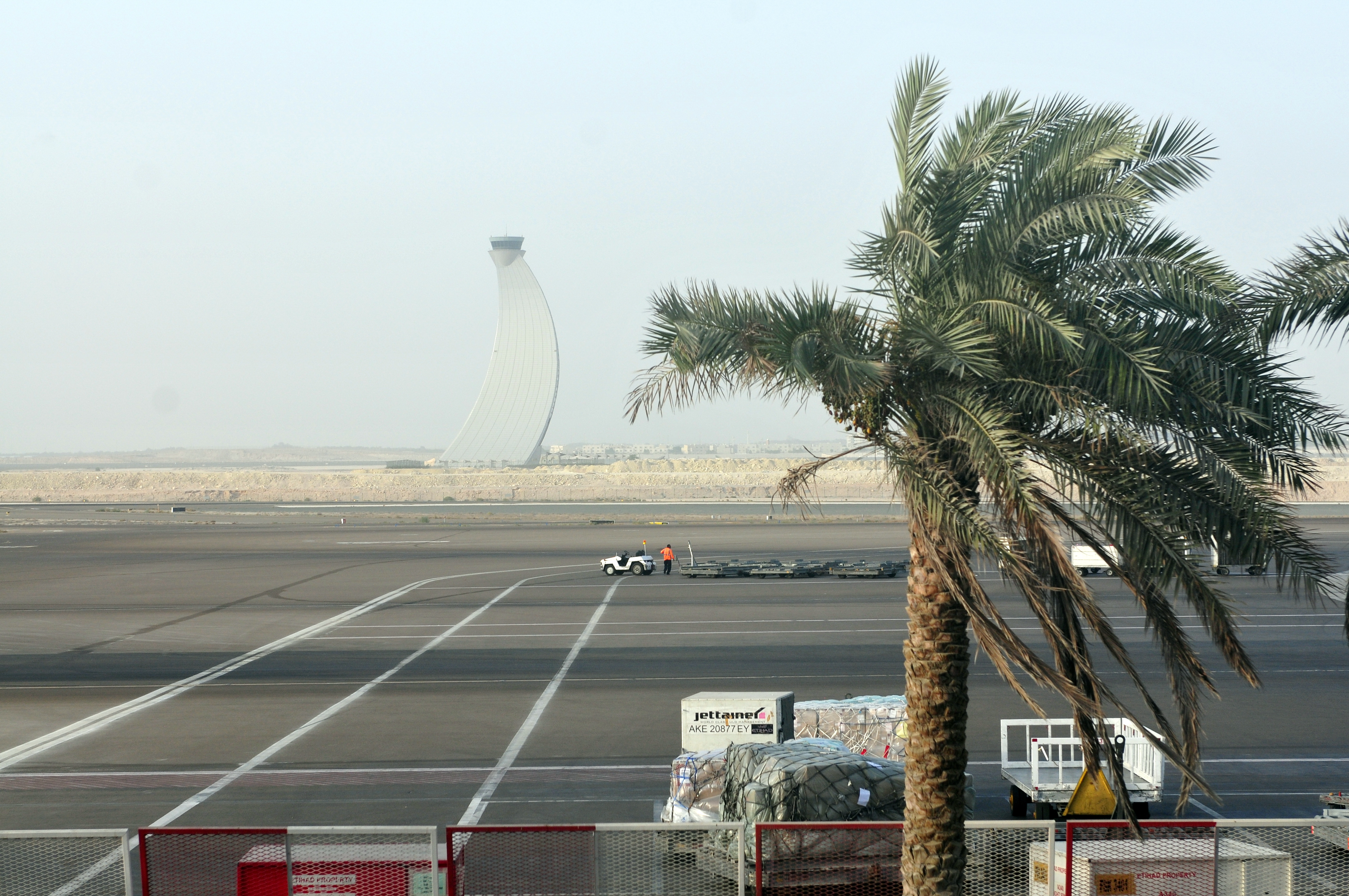
Airport apron

=== Early years ===
The airport was conceived in 1974 as part of the government's modernization plans. At the time, Al Bateen Executive Airport (then called Abu Dhabi International Airport) was the main international airport (in addition to Abu Dhabi Airfield). Access was difficult as it was located on Abu Dhabi Island which was connected to the mainland by only one bridge. Also, the city was growing, making it harder for the airport to expand. During the late 1970s, a more accessible location was found. Construction started in 1979 and the airport was inaugurated on 2 January 1982. Gulf Air, then a quadri-national airline, chose the airport as one of its four hubs.

The new airport included a circular satellite terminal (with aerobridges) with a single connection to a semi-circular terminal.

=== Development since the 2000s ===
In 2003, Etihad Airways was founded via a royal decree by UAE president Khalifa bin Zayed Al-Nahyan, and became the new airline based in the airport. The UAE government later ended its ownership of Gulf Air in 2005; previous Gulf Air CEO James Hogan was appointed as Etihad's new CEO.

Terminal 2 was opened in September 2005 to ease pressure on the main terminal. Terminal 2 did not have aerobridges and utilised buses to move passengers between aircraft and the terminal building. A second runway (Runway 13L/31R) was opened in October 2008 to cater to increased traffic. Terminal 3 was opened in January 2009. It was primarily used by Etihad Airways. The new Terminal 3, a AED 1 billion (US$270 million) interim facility, was designed to allow for the airport's passenger growth before the planned opening of the new Midfield Terminal in December 2017 (which was eventually opened in November 2023). Used predominantly by Etihad Airways, the terminal boosted the airport's seven million passenger per year capacity to 12 million. It also added 10 new gates, two of which are Airbus A380 compatible.

During the airport's early years of operation, there was no way of getting to the airport except for private vehicle or taxis. With the creation of Abu Dhabi's bus network in the late 2000s and 2010s, city-to-airport bus services were introduced.

In December 2011, the government of Abu Dhabi signed a letter of intent to build a United States border preclearance facility similar to pre-clearance customs facilities in Canada, Aruba, Bermuda, the Bahamas, and Ireland. Etihad operated its first flight to the U.S. from the facility on 25 January 2014. In 2011, the airport was recognised as the second Best Airport in Middle East at the Airport Service Quality Awards by Airports Council International. The airport celebrated its 30th anniversary in 2012.

Rotana Jet was another airline based at the airport; however, it suspended all flights indefinitely in 2017.

On 26 July 2018, Iran-aligned Houthis in Yemen claimed to have launched a drone attack at the airport. The UAE had stated earlier that there was an incident involving a truck which did not disrupt flights or cause any delays. The UAE denied any drones had reached the UAE and reported that the airport was running as usual. In 2019, The Wall Street Journal reported that a Houthi drone had exploded at the airport. In May 2019, the Houthi-run Almasirah TV channel broadcast footage of what they claimed was an attack on the airport. Two other alleged claims of a drone attack on the airport were reported by the Houthis, as well as two attacks on Dubai International Airport. An investigation by Bellingcat concluded that it was highly unlikely that a Houthi-led drone attack took place or reached Abu Dhabi or Dubai in July 2018.

== Terminals ==
Since late 2023, all flights at Abu Dhabi International Airport operate out of Terminal A, while the former terminals have been closed.

=== Terminal A ===
Airport layout

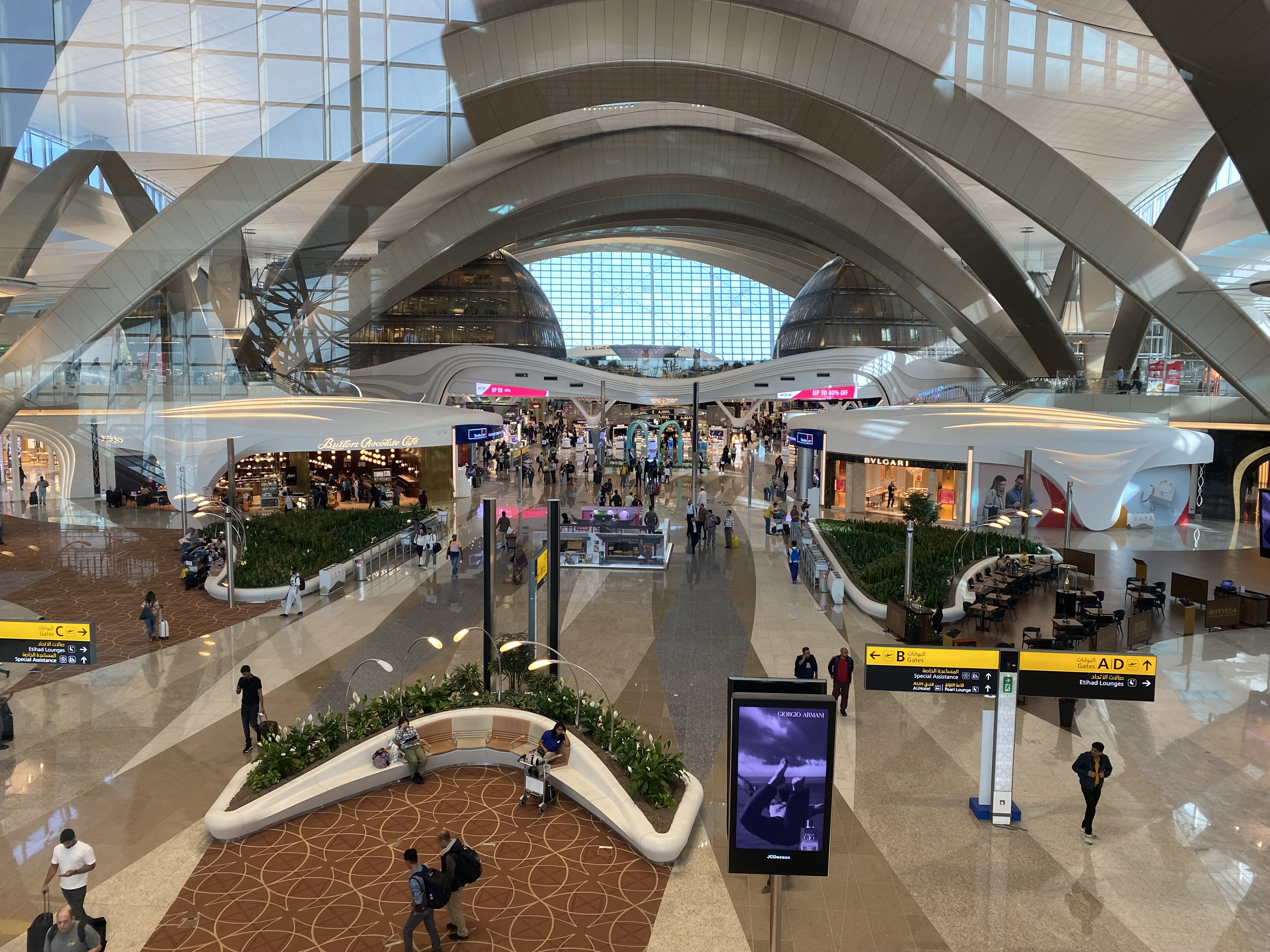
Interior of Terminal A

After several delays, development work started on a new passenger terminal, which was to be situated between the two runways and then known as the Midfield Terminal. The Midfield Terminal has increased the airport's passenger capacity to more than 45 million per year, with options for this to double in capacity to 60 million. An additional facility is under consideration that would take the capacity to 80 million. The new facility covers a floor area of over 780,000 square meters (8,400,000 sq ft), making it one of the largest airport terminal buildings in the world. It is capable of handling 79 Airbus A380-type aircraft and 11,000 passengers at peak hours. Equipped with modern and advanced facilities, it also has biometric technology to enable the screening and boarding processes to proceed faster. It has 35,000 square metres of retail and commercial space and 163 outlets. The general exterior of the terminal was designed by international architecture firm, Kohn Pedersen Fox Associates.

The new terminal was due to open on 7 July 2017, then pushed back to early 2019 in time for the 2019 Special Olympics, then delayed again until the final quarter of 2019. Due to the COVID-19 pandemic, the opening date was pushed back to sometime in mid-to-late 2021; then, on 5 July 2021, a major construction contract was cancelled. The contract was with a consortium which comprises United Arab Emirates-based Arabtec, Turkey's TAV Insaat and Athens-based Consolidated Contractors Company (CCC), with Abu Dhabi-headquartered Trojan, had been awarded the contract to finish the terminal's construction instead.

In early 2023, it was reported that the Midfield Terminal would open by the end of 2023. On 31 August 2023, Abu Dhabi Airports announced that the new terminal, now named Terminal A, would open in 'early November' the same year. It was also reported that Etihad Airways, the main carrier based in the airport, would move its operations to the new terminal once opened, alongside other airlines based in Abu Dhabi, including Air Arabia Abu Dhabi and Wizz Air Abu Dhabi.

A scene in the film Mission: Impossible – Dead Reckoning Part One was filmed at the terminal before it officially opened.

On 31 October 2023, the terminal was officially opened. All operating airlines shifted their operations gradually to the new terminal from the former three terminals. Etihad operated the first flight from the terminal on 31 October. Wizz Air Abu Dhabi and 15 other international airlines started to operate to and from the new terminal on 1 November. From 9 November, Etihad Airways operated 16 daily flights before completing its transition to this terminal on 14 November, together with Air Arabia Abu Dhabi and ten other airlines. From 14 November onwards, all airlines began operating from Terminal A.

As part of the construction of the new terminal various biometric systems were installed. In July 2024 the airport inaugurated the "Smart Travel" project, which uses biometric data collected on arrival to the UAE to validate the identities of passengers at the stations, circumventing the need to check tickets and travel documents. It was first launched on some flights, mainly those operated by Etihad, and it is planned to be extended across the airport by 2025.

=== Former terminals ===
The airport formerly consisted of three terminals from different periods which had been significantly expanded over time. They were replaced by the new Terminal A in early 2024.

==== Terminal 1 ====
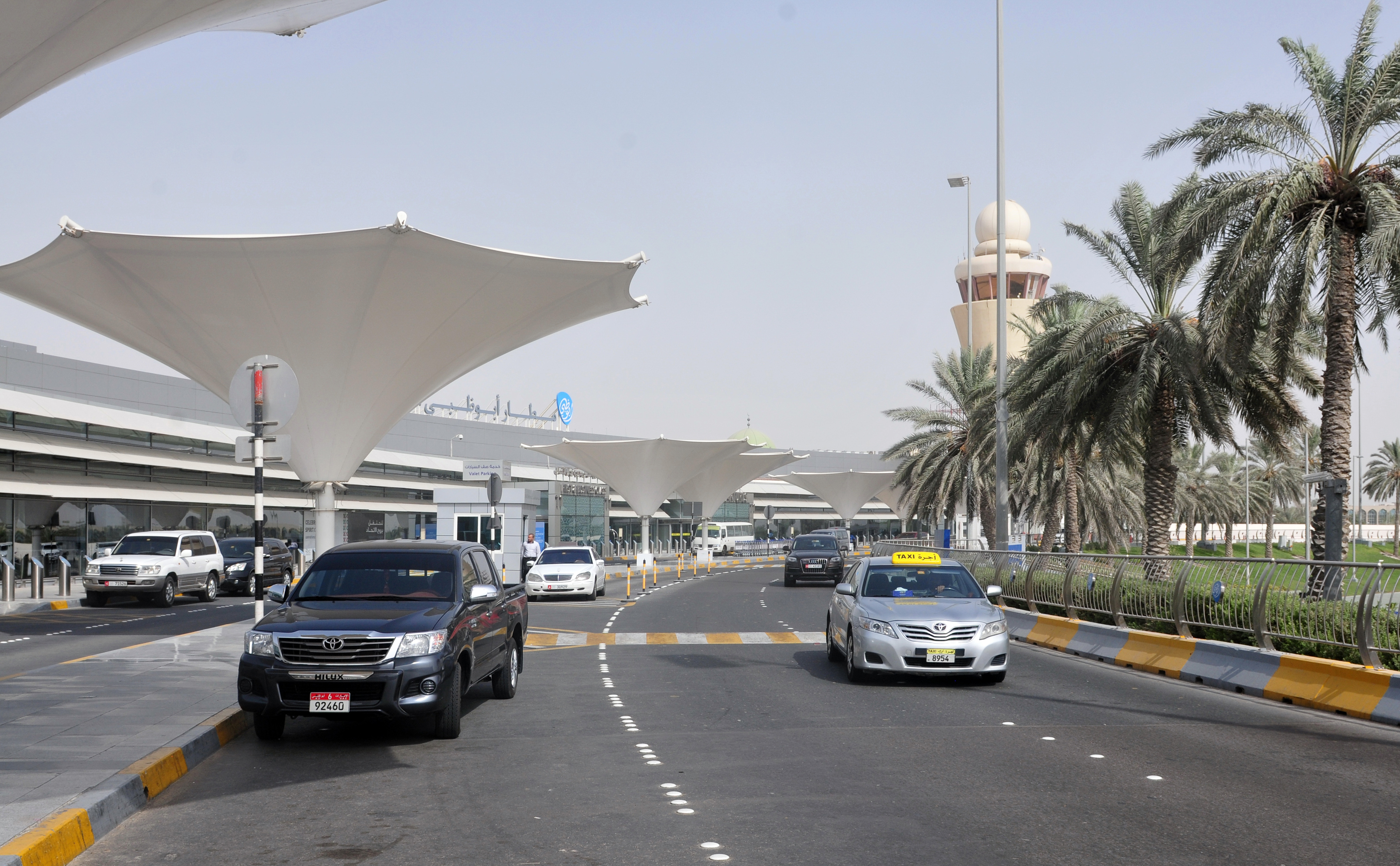
Exterior of former Terminal 1

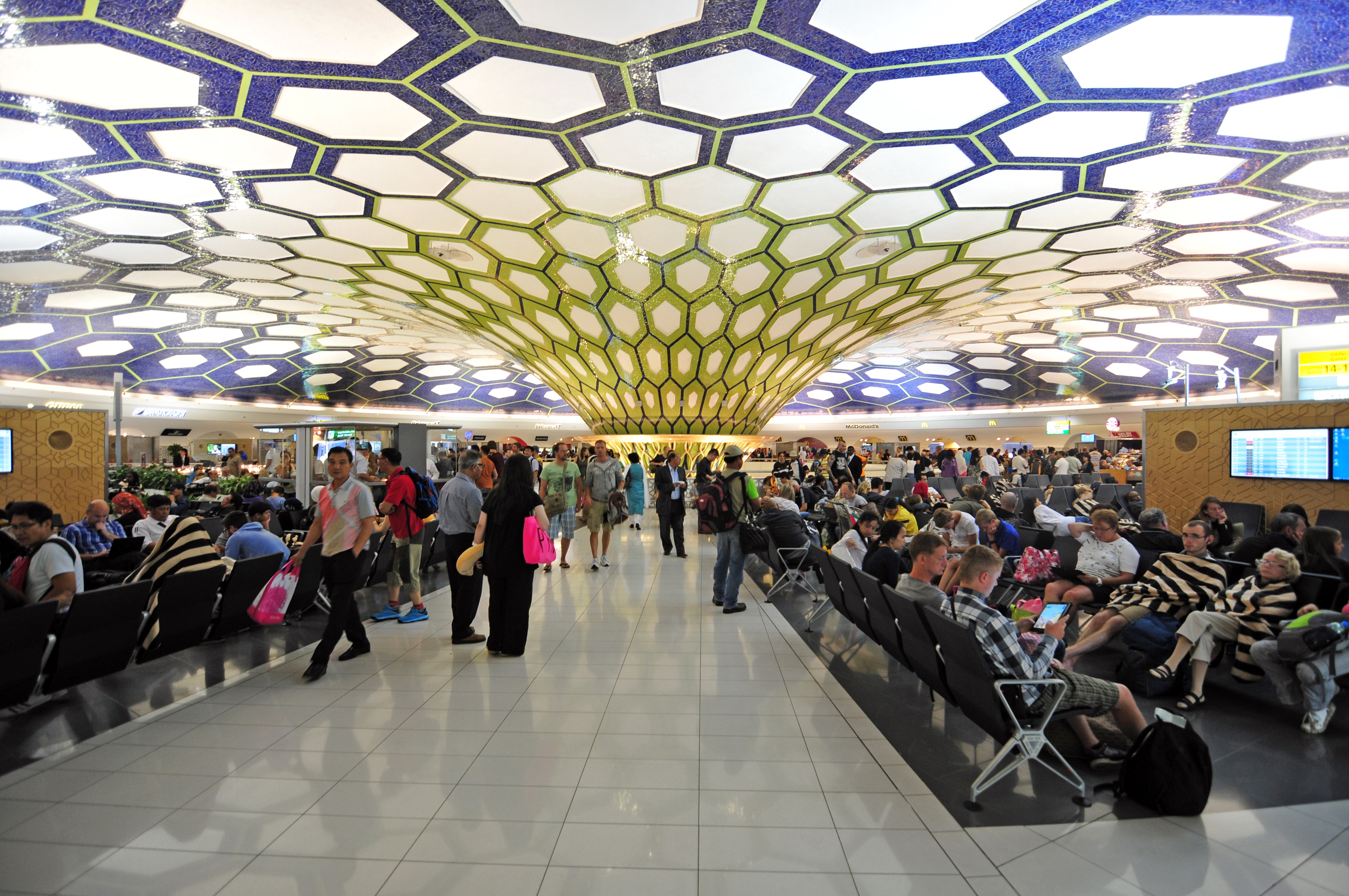
Central waiting area inside now-defunct Terminal 1

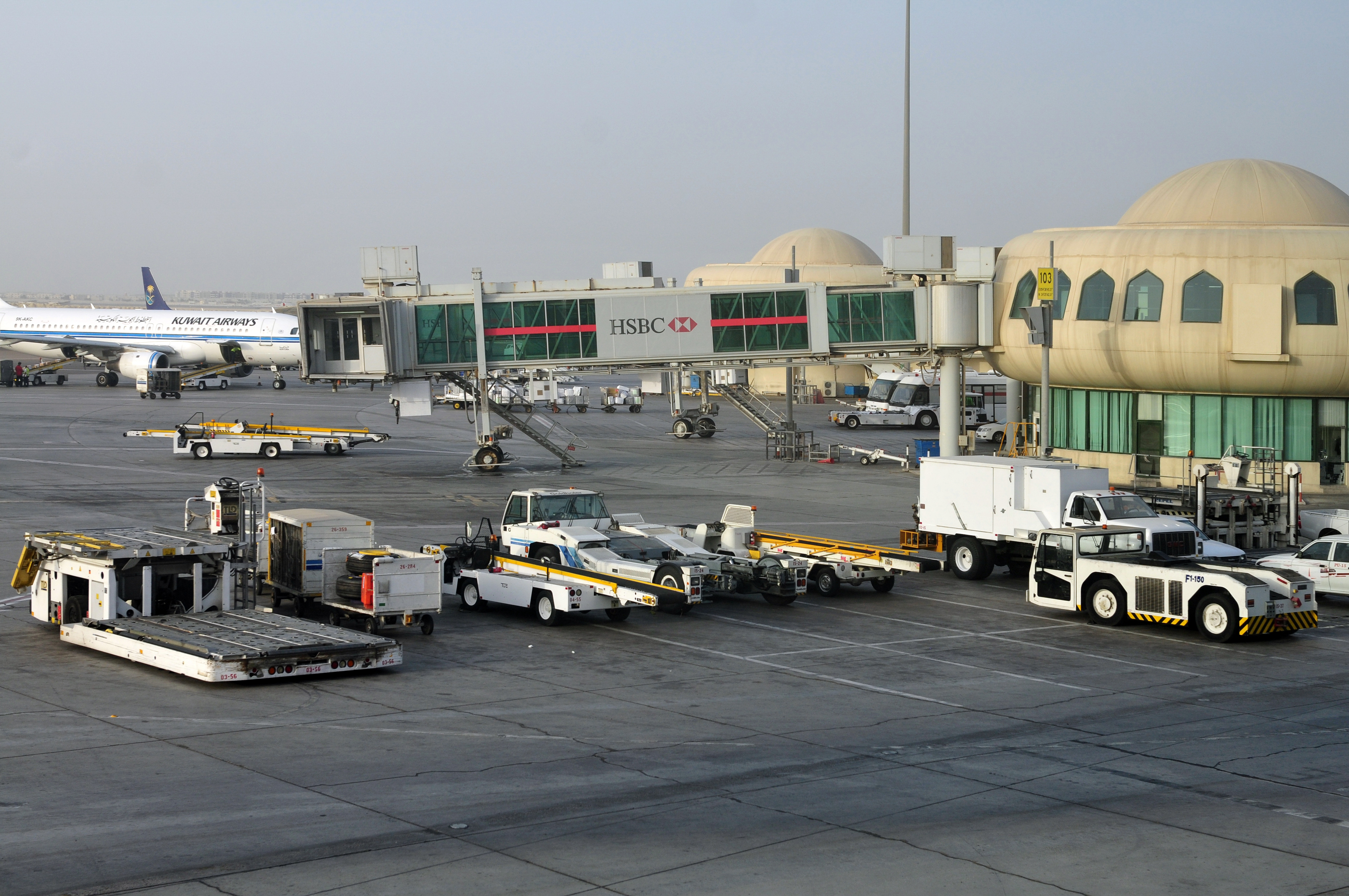
Former apron of Terminal 1

This was the oldest facility, featuring a bi-level arrivals and departures area. The nine main gates (3–11) were equipped with jetbridges and located in a circular gate area while the check-in and arrivals facilities were located in a separate main building. There were also several bus boarding gates (gates 14–22), and passengers whose planes arrive at a remote stand were bused here.

==== Terminal 2 ====
Terminal 2 was a newer facility to the east of Terminal 1 and was not connected to it. It featured 19 check-in counters, 3 bus-boarding gates (gates 24–26) and two baggage claim belts and was mostly used by low-cost carriers to/from south Asia.

==== Terminal 3 ====
Terminal 3 was the newest addition of the old terminal area and was a direct expansion to the western side of Terminal 1. It is a brick-shaped, bi-level facility featuring a duty-free and food court area as well as departure gates 32–35 and 58–61, and bus gates 28–31 and 36–57. The majority of passengers were bused to their airplanes as only 8 of its 34 gates are equipped with jetbridges. Terminal 3 was capable of handling the Airbus A380s, and was used almost entirely by Etihad Airways.

==== City terminals ====
Until 2019, a check-in facility was operated in downtown Abu Dhabi, for travelers who wanted to check in at the downtown city centre before they travelled to the airport. This facility, known as the City Terminal, resembled an airport terminal building with lounge and transport facilities. After having checked in at the City Terminal, travellers could arrive at the airport just one hour before the departure of their flight. A further check-in facility was operated by Etihad Airways at the Etihad Travel Mall on the outskirts of Dubai near Noor Bank metro station.

== Facilities ==
=== US border preclearance ===
Zayed International Airport has had United States border preclearance facilities since 26 January 2014, the only airport in the Middle East to have such a facility. Passengers on select flights to the United States are processed for entry before they board their flight so that when they arrive in the U.S. they are treated as domestic arrivals. Since 31 October 2024, preclearence is available on all Etihad flights to the United States in the new US Preclearance Facility in Terminal A. This facility is similar to those in selected Canadian, Caribbean and Irish airports.

== Airlines and destinations ==
=== Passenger ===
The following airlines operate regular scheduled and charter flights to and from Abu Dhabi:

Airlines	Destinations
Aegean Airlines	Seasonal: Athens
Aeroflot	Moscow–Sheremetyevo
Air Arabia	Ahmedabad, Alexandria, Almaty, Amman–Queen Alia, Amman–Civil, Baghdad, Bahrain, Baku, Beirut, Cairo, Chennai, Colombo–Bandaranaike, Kathmandu, Kolkata, Kozhikode, Kuwait City, Moscow–Domodedovo, Muscat, Salalah, Sohag, Sialkot, Tashkent, Tbilisi, Thiruvananthapuram, Yekaterinburg Yerevan; Seasonal: Assiut, Giza
Air Astana	Almaty, Astana
Air China	Beijing–Capital
Air India Express	Amritsar, Bengaluru, Goa–Mopa, Guwahati, Hyderabad, Indore, Kannur, Kozhikode, Lucknow, Mumbai–Navi, Mumbai–Shivaji, Pune
Air Samarkand	Tashkent
Air Seychelles	Mahé
Akasa Air	Ahmedabad, Bengaluru, Chennai
Animawings	Seasonal: Bucharest–Otopeni
Badr Airlines	Port Sudan
British Airways	London–Heathrow
China Eastern Airlines	Shanghai–Pudong
Condor	Berlin, Frankfurt
Egyptair	Cairo
Ethiopian Airlines	Addis Ababa
Etihad Airways	Accra (begins 17 March 2027), Addis Ababa, Ahmedabad, Amman–Queen Alia, Amsterdam, Asmara, Athens, Atlanta, Bahrain, Bangkok–Suvarnabhumi, Barcelona, Beijing–Daxing, Bengaluru, Boston, Brussels, Bucharest–Otopeni (begins 21 December 2026), Cairo, Calgary, Casablanca, Charlotte, Chengdu–Tianfu (begins 6 March 2027), Chennai, Chiang Mai, Chicago–O'Hare, Colombo–Bandaranaike, Copenhagen, Damascus, Dammam, Delhi, Denpasar, Dhaka, Doha, Dublin, Düsseldorf, Frankfurt, Gassim, Geneva, Gothenburg (begins 17 December 2026), Guangzhou (resumes 23 March 2027), Hangzhou (begins 4 March 2027), Hanoi, Harare (begins 24 March 2027), Hong Kong, Hyderabad, Islamabad, Istanbul, Jaipur, Jakarta–Soekarno-Hatta, Jeddah, Johannesburg–O.R. Tambo, Kabul, Karachi, Kinshasa–N'djili (begins 18 March 2027), Kochi, Kolkata, Kozhikode, Krabi, Kuala Lumpur–International, Kuwait City, Lagos (resumes 18 March 2027), Lahore, Lisbon, London–Heathrow, Lubumbashi (begins 24 March 2027), Luxembourg, Madrid, Malé, Manchester, Manila, Medina, Melbourne, Milan–Malpensa, Moscow–Sheremetyevo, Mumbai–Shivaji, Munich, Muscat, Nairobi–Jomo Kenyatta, New York–JFK, Paris–Charles de Gaulle, Peshawar, Phnom Penh, Phuket, Prague, Red Sea, Riyadh, Rome–Fiumicino, Saint Petersburg, Seoul–Incheon, Shanghai–Pudong, Shenzhen (begins 7 March 2027), Singapore, Sochi, Sydney–Kingsford Smith, Taipei–Taoyuan, Tashkent, Tel Aviv, Thiruvananthapuram, Tokyo–Narita, Toronto–Pearson, Tunis, Vienna, Warsaw–Chopin, Washington–Dulles, Zürich; Seasonal: El Alamein, Kazan, Kraków, Málaga, Mykonos, Nice, Osaka−Kansai, Palma de Mallorca, Salalah, Santorini, Saint Petersburg, Zanzibar
Eurowings	Seasonal: Berlin
Fly Cham	Damascus
Flynas	Riyadh
Gulf Air	Bahrain
Hainan Airlines	Haikou
Jazeera Airways	Kuwait City
IndiGo	Ahmedabad, Bengaluru, Bhubaneswar, Chandigarh, Chennai, Coimbatore, Hyderabad, Kannur, Kozhikode, Lucknow, Madurai, Mangaluru, Tiruchirappalli, Visakhapatnam
Luxair	Seasonal: Luxembourg
Middle East Airlines	Beirut
Oman Air	Muscat
Pakistan International Airlines	Islamabad, Karachi, Lahore, Peshawar, Sialkot
Pegasus Airlines	Istanbul–Sabiha Gökçen
Pobeda	Makhachkala, Moscow–Vnukovo
Qatar Airways	Doha
Royal Jordanian	Amman–Queen Alia, Aqaba
SalamAir	Muscat
Saudia	Jeddah, Riyadh
Smartwings	Seasonal charter: Cologne/Bonn, Leipzig/Halle, Nuremberg
SunExpress	Antalya, İzmir
Syrian Air	Damascus
Turkish Airlines	Istanbul
US-Bangla Airlines	Dhaka
Wizz Air	Budapest, Katowice, Kraków, Larnaca, Sofia; Seasonal: Cluj-Napoca

=== Cargo ===
Airlines	Destinations
CMA CGM Air Cargo	Paris–Charles de Gaulle
Etihad Cargo	Amsterdam, Bengaluru, Boston, Chennai, Chittagong, Columbus–Rickenbacker, Dammam, Delhi, Dhaka, East Midlands, Ezhou, Frankfurt, Hanoi, Hong Kong, Miami, Mumbai–Shivaji, Paris–Charles de Gaulle, Shanghai–Pudong
Turkmenistan Airlines Cargo	Ashgabat

== Statistics ==
=== Busiest routes ===
Busiest international routes to and from Abu Dhabi Airport as of 2021:

Rank	Airport	Country	Total passengers
1	Cairo	Egypt	372,456
2	Islamabad	Pakistan	209,280
3	Delhi	India	197,012
4	Lahore	Pakistan	184,315
5	Dhaka	Bangladesh	182,983

== Ground transportation ==
=== Road ===
Zayed International Airport is connected to the Emirate and its surroundings, including Dubai and Al Ain, by a highway network. Route E10 directly passes the airport. Car rental, taxis and dedicated chauffeur services are available.

=== Public transport ===
The Abu Dhabi Department of Transport operates seven bus routes from the airport throughout Abu Dhabi and its surroundings, including lines A1 and A2, which lead to the city center and run 24 hours per day, and E102 bus connecting the airport with the city of Dubai. Etihad Airways additionally provides a coach service for its passengers from Zayed International Airport to Al Ain and Downtown Dubai.

== Accidents and incidents ==
- On 25 October 1977, Emirati minister Saif Ghobash was shot dead at the airport by a Palestinian gunman in an attempt to assassinate Syrian Foreign Minister Abdul Halim Khaddam.
- On 23 September 1983, Gulf Air Flight 771 crashed while on approach to Zayed International Airport. All 112 passengers and crew on board were killed. A bomb going off in the baggage hold of the aircraft was the cause of the accident.
- In May 1997, a Gulf Air plane from Bombay airport crashed at the airport. No deaths were reported.
- On 28 February 2026, an incident at the airport believed to be strikes from the 2026 Israeli–United States strikes on Iran killed an Asian national and injured seven others.

== See also ==
- Al Ain International Airport
- Abu Dhabi Central Capital District
- List of the busiest airports in the Middle East
