= Al Ain International Airport =

International airport serving Al Ain, United Arab Emirates

Al-Ain International Airport مَطَار ٱلْعَيْن ٱلدَُوَلِِي (in Arabic)

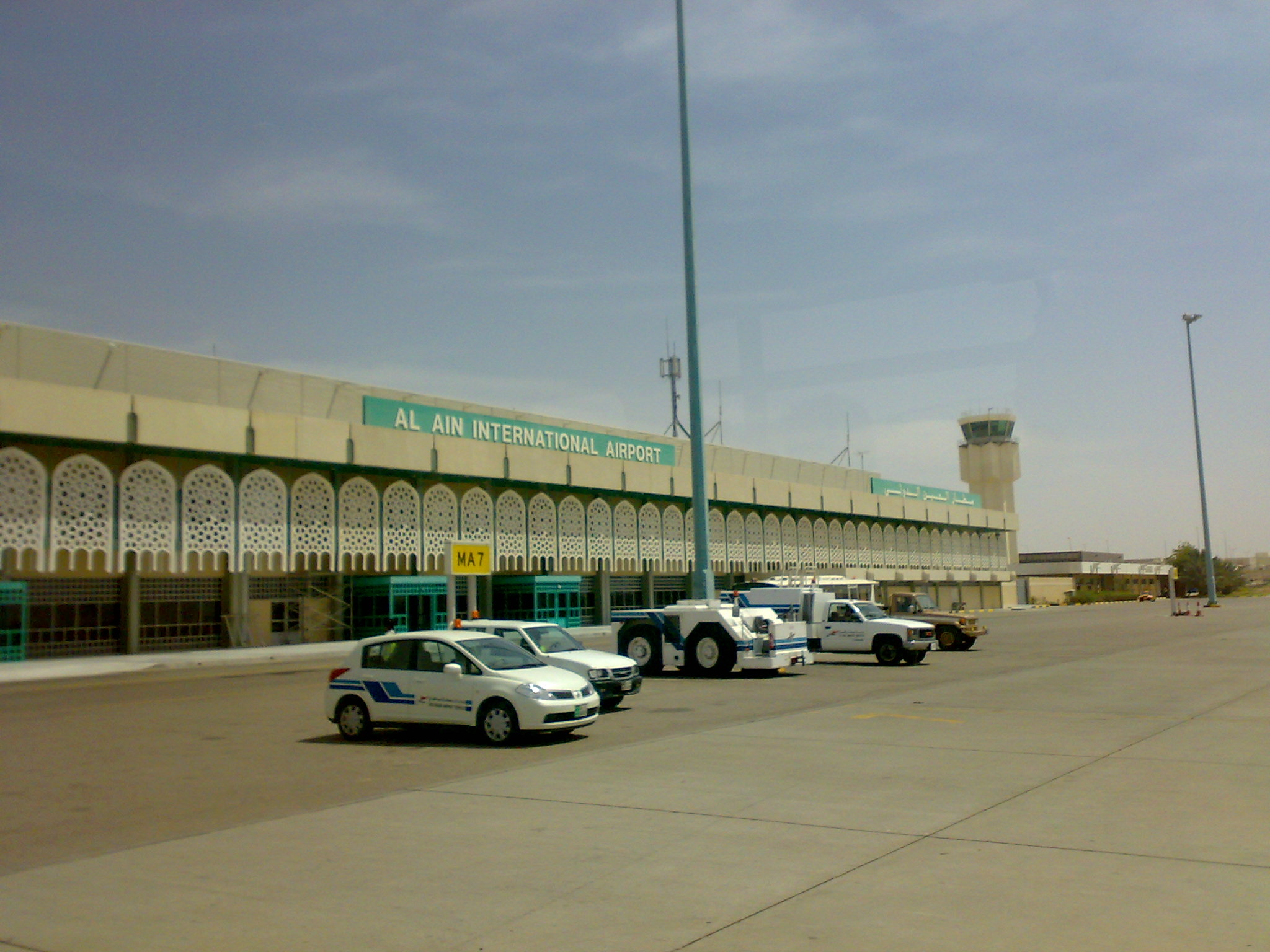
- IATA: AAN; ICAO: OMAL

Summary
- Airport type: Public
- Operator: Abu Dhabi Airports Company
- Serves: Al Ain
- Opened: 31 March 1994
- Time zone: UAE Standard Time (UTC+04:00)
- Elevation AMSL: 866 ft (264 m)
- Coordinates: 24°15′42″N 055°36′33″E

Map
- Location in the UAE

Runways
| Direction | Length | | Surface |
| Direction | m | ft | Surface |
|---|---|---|---|
| 01/19 | 4,005 | 13,140 | Asphalt |

Al Ain International Airport (IATA: AAN, ICAO: OMAL) (Arabic: مَطَار ٱلْعَيْن ٱلدَُوَلِِي, transliterated: Maṭār Al-ʿAyn Ad-Duwalī) is an airport located 8 nautical miles (15 km; 9.2 mi) west-northwest of Al Ain in the Eastern Region of the Emirate of Abu Dhabi, the United Arab Emirates. It was opened on 31 March 1994.

== History ==
In September 2025, Abu Dhabi Airports introduced a five year development plan for the airport, aimed at upgrading its infrastructure, expanding operational capacity, and attracting international airlines.

On 11th October 2026, UAE president Sheikh Mohamed bin Zayed ordered the renaming of the airport from Al Ain International Airport to Tahnoun International Airport, in recognition of Sheikh Tahnoun bin Mohammed Al Nahyan service to the UAE.

== Airlines and destinations ==
| Airlines | Destinations |
|---|---|
| Air India Express | Kozhikode |
| Ariana Afghan Airlines | Khost |
| Etihad Airways | Seasonal: Jeddah |
| Fly Jinnah | Islamabad (Begins 2 December 2026), Lahore (Begins 2 December 2026), |
| Jazeera Airways | Kuwait City |
| Nile Air | Cairo |
| Pakistan International Airlines | Islamabad |

== Accidents and incidents ==
- On 27 February 2011, a Grumman 21T eight seater aircraft (registration N221AG) crashed shortly after takeoff, killing all four on board.

== See also ==
- Buraimi Airport
