= Time in the United Arab Emirates =

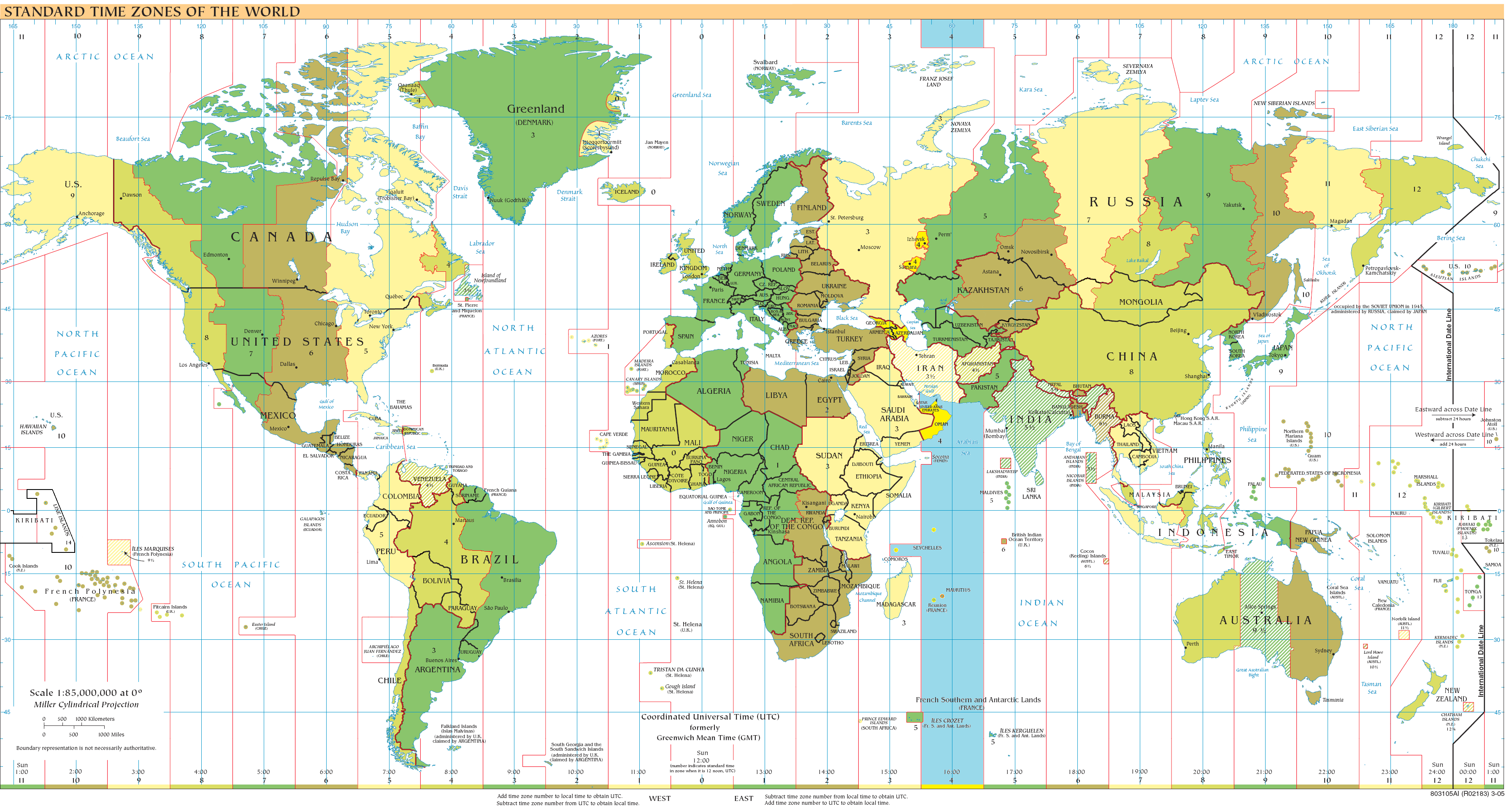
UTC+04:00 time zone (blue)

United Arab Emirates Standard Time or UAE Standard Time is the time zone for the UAE. It is given by Gulf Standard Time, being 4 hours ahead of GMT/UTC (UTC+04:00) and is co-linear with neighbouring Oman. The UAE does not change clocks for daylight saving time.

== IANA time zone database ==
The IANA time zone database contains one zone for the UAE in the file zone.tab, named "Asia/Dubai".

c.c.	Coordinates	Timezone name	Comments	UTC offset (Std.)	UTC offset (DST)
AE	+2518+05518	Asia/Dubai	Crozet	+04:00	—N/a
