= List of airline codes (C) =

This is a list of all airline codes. The table lists the IATA airline designators, the ICAO airline designators and the airline call signs (telephony designator). Historical assignments are also included for completeness.

== Codes ==
Airline codes
| IATA | ICAO | Airline | Call sign | Country | Comments |
|---|---|---|---|---|---|
| AU | CJL | Canada Jetlines | JETBUS | Canada | Defunct |
| VL | LHX | City Airlines | CITYAIR | Germany | LH subsidiary Allocated in 2023 |
| | SRJ | C Air Jet Airlines | SYRJET | Syria | |
| | TIP | C and M Aviation | TRANSPAC | United States | |
| | ORO | C N Air | CAPRI | Spain | |
| | RWG | C&M Airways | RED WING | United States | |
| | RMU | C.S.P., Societe | AIR-MAUR | Mauritania | |
| | CJZ | Caliber Jet | CALIBER JET | United States | |
| 4A | DYN | California Pacific Airlines | AERODYNAMICS | United States | Defunct |
| QC | CRC | Camair-Co | CAMAIRCO | Cameroon | |
| | QAI | Conquest Air | CHICKPEA | United States | 2014 |
| | CBH | Corporate Eagle Management Services | CLUB HOUSE | United States | Allocated in 2014 |
| | CRF | Croix Rouge Francais | CROIX ROUGE | France | 2014 |
| | CAA | Civil Aviation Authority of the Czech Republic | INSPECTOR | Czech Republic | |
| | BKR | Civil Air Patrol South Carolina Wing | BOX KAR | United States | |
| | BFN | Compagnie Nationale Naganagani | | Burkina Faso | |
| | AWX | Civil Aviation Authority Directorate of Airspace Policy | ALLWEATHER | United Kingdom | |
| | BBN | Civil Aviation Authority Airworthiness Division | BRABAZON | United Kingdom | |
| | ATQ | CHC Helicopters Nigeria | COLIBRI | Nigeria | |
| | APL | Corporativo Aereo Principal | AEREO PRINCIPAL | Mexico | |
| | AIO | Chief of Staff, United States Air Force | AIR CHIEF | United States | |
| | AID | Christian Konig - Century Airbirds | CENTURY AIRBIRD | Austria | |
| | | Cambridge Recurrent Training | CAMBRIDGE | United Kingdom | |
| | | California Department of Forestry and Fire Protection | CALFIRE | United States | |
| | | Careflight Queensland | SAMARITAN | Australia | |
| | | Castle Air Charter | CASTLEFILM | United Kingdom | |
| | | Challenges Aviation | TIGER | United Kingdom | |
| | | Challenges Limited | HERITAGE | United Kingdom | |
| | | Cheqair | ASTON | United Kingdom | |
| | | Clacton Aero Club | CLASSIC WINGS | United Kingdom | |
| | | Coral Sun Airways | CORAL SUN | Kiribati | |
| | | Cowan Group | COWAN | United States | |
| | SMW | Carpatair Flight Service | SMART WINGS | Romania | Was Carpatair Flight Training |
| | CCL | Cambodia Airlines | ANGKOR WAT | Cambodia | |
| KR | KME | Cambodia Airways | GIANT IBIS | Cambodia | |
| | CCB | Caricom Airways | DOLPHIN | Barbados | |
| | CYH | China Southern Airlines Henan | YUHAO | China | |
| | CFB | Chongqing Forebase General Aviation | FOREBASE | China | |
| | XCA | Colt Transportes Aereos | COLT | Brazil | |
| | GCY | CHC Global Operations International | HELIBIRD | United Kingdom | |
| | AUN | Common Sky | COMMON SKY | Austria | |
| | CBI | Cabi | CABI | Ukraine | |
| | CPI | Compagnia Aeronautica Italiana | AIRCAI | Italy | |
| 5C | ICL | Challenge Airlines IL | CAL | Israel | ex CAL-Cargo Air Lines |
| | CMR | CAM Air Management | CAMEO | United Kingdom | |
| | CTZ | CATA Línea Aérea | CATA | Argentina | |
| | CCF | CCF Manager Airline | TOMCAT | Germany | |
| | CED | CEDTA (Compañía Ecuatoriana De Transportes Aéreos) | CEDTA | Ecuador | |
| | HBI | CHC Denmark | HELIBIRD | Denmark | |
| | HEM | CHC Helicopter | HEMS | Australia | |
| AW | SCH | CHC Airways | SCHREINER | Netherlands | formerly Schreiner Airways. ICAO code in use by another company, call sign no longer allocated |
| | HKS | CHC Helikopter Service | HELIBUS | Norway | |
| | VCI | CI-Tours | CI-TOURS | Ivory Coast | |
| | CKC | CKC Services | | United States | |
| | CMZ | CM Stair | CEE-EM STAIRS | Mauritania | |
| | CNT | Centre national d'études des télécommunications - C.N.E.T. | KNET | France | |
| | OAP | COAPA AIR | COAPA | Mexico | |
| | PDR | COMAV | SPEEDSTER | Namibia | |
| | CRH | CRI Helicopters Mexico | HELI-MEX | Mexico | |
| | IRO | CSA Air | IRON AIR | United States | |
| | CSE | CSE Aviation | OXFORD | United Kingdom | |
| | CTQ | CTK Network Aviation | CITYLINK | Ghana | |
| | CBR | Cabair College of Air Training | CABAIR | United Kingdom | |
| | CVE | Cabo Verde Express | KABEX | Cape Verde | |
| | CWD | Caernarfon Airworld | AMBASSADOR | United Kingdom | |
| | CXE | Caicos Express Airways | CAICOS | Turks and Caicos Islands | |
| | CCE | Cairo Air Transport Company | | Egypt | |
| | CGC | Cal Gulf Aviation | CAL-GULF | São Tomé and Príncipe | |
| | REZ | Cal-West Aviation | CAL AIR | United States | |
| | CSL | California Air Shuttle | CALIFORNIA SHUTTLE | United States | |
| 3C | CMV | Calima Aviación | CALIMA | Spain | |
| MO | CAV | Calm Air | CALM AIR | Canada | |
| R9 | CAM | Camai Air | AIR CAMAI | United States | Village Aviation |
| K6 | KHV | Cambodia Angkor Air | ANGKOR AIR | Cambodia | |
| UY | UYC | Cameroon Airlines | CAM-AIR | Cameroon | Defunct |
| | HSO | Campania Helicopteros De Transporte | HELIASTURIAS | Spain | |
| C6 | CJA | CanJet | CANJET | Canada | |
| | PIL | Canada Jet Charters | PINNACLE | Canada | |
| CP | CDN | Canadian Airlines | CANADIAN | Canada | Defunct |
| | CTG | Canadian Coast Guard | CANADIAN COAST GUARD | Canada | |
| | HIA | Canadian Eagle Aviation | HAIDA | Canada | |
| | CFC | Canadian Forces | CANFORCE | Canada | |
| | BZD | Canadian Global Air Ambulance | BLIZZARD | Canada | ICAO Code and callsign no longer allocated |
| | CDN | Canadian Helicopters | CANADIAN | Canada | |
| | TKR | Canadian Interagency Forest Fire Centre | TANKER | Canada | ICAO Code and callsign no longer allocated |
| | XNC | Canadian National Telecommunications | | Canada | ICAO Code and callsign no longer allocated |
| 7F | AKT | Canadian North | ARCTIC | Canada | Air Norterra |
| CP | CPC | Canadian Pacific Airlines | EMPRESS | Canada | ICAO Code and callsign no longer allocated |
| | CDR | Canadian Regional Airlines | CANADIAN REGIONAL | Canada | ICAO Code and callsign no longer allocated |
| | CWH | Canadian Warplane Heritage Museum | WARPLANE HERITAGE | Canada | |
| W2 | CWA | Canadian Western Airlines | CANADIAN WESTERN | Canada | |
| | CWW | Canair | CANAIR | China | |
| | CUI | Cancun Air | CAN-AIR | Mexico | |
| 9K | KAP | Cape Air | CAIR | United States | |
| | CTO | Cape Air Transport | | Australia | |
| | SEM | Cape Central Airways | SEMO | United States | |
| | CMY | Cape Smythe Air | CAPE SMYTHE AIR | United States | |
| | CPX | Capital Air Service | CAPAIR | United States | |
| | CPD | Capital Airlines | CAPITAL DELTA | Kenya | |
| | NCP | Capital Airlines Limited | CAPITAL SHUTTLE | Nigeria | |
| PT | CCI | Capital Cargo International Airlines | CAPPY | United States | Allocation deleted 2013 |
| | CCQ | Capital City Air Carriers | CAP CITY | United States | |
| | EGL | Capital Trading Aviation | PRESTIGE | United Kingdom | |
| | CEX | Capitol Air Express | CAPITOL EXPRESS | United States | |
| | CWZ | Capitol Wings Airline | CAPWINGS | United States | |
| | VAN | Caravan Air | CAMEL | Mauritania | |
| | CWN | Cardiff Wales Flying Club | CAMBRIAN | United Kingdom | |
| | FVA | Cardinal/Air Virginia | AIR VIRGINIA | United States | |
| | GOL | Cardolaar | CARGOLAAR | Namibia | |
| | CDI | Cards Air Services | CARDS | Philippines | |
| | CFH | CareFlight | CARE FLIGHT | Australia | |
| | CDM | Carga Aérea Dominicana | CARGA AEREA | Dominican Republic | |
| | EST | Carga Express Internacional | CARGAINTER | Mexico | |
| GG | GGC | Cargo 360 | LONG-HAUL | United States | |
| | MCX | Cargo Express | MAURICARGO | Mauritania | |
| | CRV | Cargo Ivoire | CARGOIV | Ivory Coast | |
| | CLM | Cargo Link (Caribbean) | CARGO LINK | Barbados | |
| P3 | CLU | Cargo Logic Air | FIREBIRD | United Kingdom | |
| | CTW | Cargo Three | THIRD CARGO | Panama | |
| 2G | CRG | Cargoitalia | WHITE PELICAN | Italy | |
| W8 | CJT | Cargojet Airways | CARGOJET | Canada | |
| CV | CLX | Cargolux | CARGOLUX | Luxembourg | |
| C8 | ICV | Cargolux Italia | CARGO MED | Italy | |
| | CGM | Cargoman | HOTEL CHARLIE | Oman | |
| | DEL | Carib Aviation | RED TAIL | Antigua and Barbuda | |
| | BCB | Carib Express | WAVEBIRD | Barbados | |
| | PWD | CARIBAIR | CARIBAIR | Dominican Republic | |
| | DCC | Caribbean Air Cargo | CARICARGO | Barbados | |
| | CLT | Caribbean Air Transport | CARIBBEAN | Netherlands | ICAO Code and callsign no longer allocated |
| | CLT | Club Aerocelta de Vuelo Con Motor | | Spain | |
| BW | BWA | Caribbean Airlines | CARIBBEAN AIRLINES | Trinidad and Tobago | |
| | IQQ | Caribbean Airways | CARIBJET | Barbados | |
| | CSX | Choice Airways | CHOICE AIR | United States | |
| | TLC | Caribbean Express | CARIB-X | United States | |
| 8B | GFI | Caribbean Star Airlines | CARIB STAR | Antigua and Barbuda | |
| | CRB | Caricom Airways | CARIBBEAN COMMUTER | Suriname | |
| | CRT | Caribintair | CARIBINTAIR | Haiti | |
| | CVG | Carill Aviation | CARILL | United Kingdom | |
| V3 | KRP | Carpatair | CARPATAIR | Romania | |
| | CRR | Carranza | CARRANZA | Chile | Defunct |
| | ULS | Carroll Air Service | ULSTER | United States | |
| | CMT | Casement Aviation | CASEMENT | United States | |
| | CSO | Casino Airline | CASAIR | United States | |
| | CSP | Casper Air Service | CASPER AIR | United States | |
| RV | CPN | Caspian Airlines | CASPIAN | Iran | |
| | CSJ | Castle Aviation | CASTLE | United States | |
| | CAZ | Cat Aviation | EUROCAT | Switzerland | |
| | CBT | Catalina Flying Boats | CATALINA AIR | United States | |
| | TEX | Catex | CATEX | France | |
| KA | HDA | Cathay Dragon | DRAGON | Hong Kong | Defunct; IATA Code transferred to Aero Nomad Airlines |
| CX | CPA | Cathay Pacific | CATHAY | Hong Kong | |
| | CJR | Caverton Helicopters | CAVERTON AIR | Nigeria | |
| KX | CAY | Cayman Airways | CAYMAN | Cayman Islands | |
| 5J | CEB | Cebu Pacific | CEBU | Philippines | |
| | CIL | Cecil Aviation | CECIL | United Kingdom | |
| | CEG | Cega Aviation | CEGA | United Kingdom | |
| | CEC | Celtic Airways | CELTAIR | United Kingdom | |
| | CWE | Celtic West | CELTIC | United Kingdom | |
| | CEV | Centre d'Essais en Vol | CENTEV | France | |
| | CNL | Centennial Airlines | WYO-AIR | United States | |
| | CNS | Cobalt Air LLC | CHRONOS | United States | |
| | CVO | Center Vol | CENTERVOL | Spain | |
| | CTS | Center-South | CENTER-SOUTH | Russia | |
| | CET | Centrafrican Airlines | CENTRAFRICAIN | Central African Republic | |
| | CAX | Central Air Express | CENTRAL EXPRESS | Democratic Republic of the Congo | |
| | CTL | Central Airlines | CENTRAL COMMUTER | United States | |
| | CNY | Central Airways | CENTRAL LEONE | Sierra Leone | |
| | ACN | Central American Airlines | AEROCENTRO | Nicaragua | |
| | YOG | Central Aviation | YOGAN AIR | United States | |
| | DRN | Central De Discos De Reynosa | DISCOS REYNOSA | Mexico | |
| 2C | CMA | CMA-CGM AIRCARGO | FRENCH CARGO | France | |
| | CHA | Central Flying Service | CHARTER CENTRAL | United States | |
| | CEM | Central Mongolia Airways | CENTRAL MONGOLIA | Mongolia | |
| 9M | GLR | Central Mountain Air | GLACIER | Canada | |
| | CQC | Central Queensland Aviation College | | Australia | |
| | CSI | Central Skyport | SKYPORT | United States | |
| | CLW | Centralwings | CENTRALWINGS | Poland | |
| | DTV | Centre Airlines | DUTCH VALLEY | United States | |
| | CGS | Centre of Applied Geodynamica | GEO CENTRE | Russia | |
| J7 | CVC | Centre-Avia | AVIACENTRE | Russia | |
| | CCV | Centro De Helicopteros Corporativos | HELICORPORATIVO | Mexico | |
| | ACF | Centro de Formación Aeronáutica de Canarias | FORCAN | Spain | |
| WE | CWC | Centurion Air Cargo | CHALLENGE CARGO | United States | |
| | URY | Century Aviation | CENTURY AVIA | Mexico | |
| | HAI | Century Aviation International | | Canada | |
| | XAD | Certified Air Dispatch | | United States | |
| | CER | Cetraca Aviation Service | CETRACA | Democratic Republic of the Congo | |
| | IRU | Chabahar Airlines | CHABAHAR | Iran | |
| CS | CSW | Chair Airlines | EIGER | Switzerland | |
| | CLG | Chalair Aviation | CHALLAIR | France | |
| OP | CHK | Chalk's International Airlines | CHALKS | United States | |
| | CLS | Challenge Air Transport | AIRISTO | Germany | |
| | CHS | Challenge Aviation | CHALLENGE AVIATION | Australia | |
| | OFF | Challenge International Airlines | CHALLENGE AIR | United States | |
| | CHG | Challenge Airlines BE | Challenge | Belgium | |
| | CPH | Champagne Airlines | CHAMPAGNE | France | |
| MG | CCP | Champion Air | CHAMPION AIR | United States | |
| | NCH | Chanchangi Airlines | CHANCHANGI | Nigeria | |
| 2Z | CGN | Chang An Airlines | CHANGAN | China | |
| | CHN | Channel Island Aviation | CHANNEL | United States | |
| | WML | Chantilly Air | MARLIN | United States | |
| | CPL | Chaparral Airlines | CHAPARRAL | United States | |
| S8 | CSU | Chari Aviation Services | CHARI SERVICE | Chad | |
| | CAH | Charlan Air Charter | CHARLAN | South Africa | ICAO Code and callsign no longer allocated |
| | HMD | Charlie Hammonds Flying Service | HAMMOND | United States | |
| | CGD | Charlotte Air National Guard | | United States | |
| | CHW | Charter Air | CHARTER WIEN | Austria | |
| | HRT | Chartright Air | CHARTRIGHT | Canada | |
| RP* | CHQ | Chautauqua Airlines | CHAUTAUQUA | United States | Was US* |
| | CBB | Cheboksary Airenterprise JSC | CHEBAIR | Russia | |
| | CHM | Chemech Aviation | | Pakistan | |
| | CHZ | Cherline | CHERL | Russia | |
| | CMK | Chernomor-Avia | CHERAVIA | Russia | |
| | CBM | Cherokee Express | BLUE MAX | United States | |
| | CCY | Cherry Air | CHERRY | United States | |
| | CAB | Chesapeake Air Service | CHESAPEAKE AIR | United States | |
| | CVR | Chevron U.S.A | CHEVRON | United States | |
| | CYA | Cheyenne Airways | CHEYENNE AIR | United States | |
| | CGO | Chicago Air | WILD ONION | United States | |
| C8 | WDY | Chicago Jet Group | WINDY CITY | United States | |
| | RAT | Chief Rat Flight Services | RIVERRAT | South Africa | Defunct |
| | CCH | Chilchota Taxi Aéreo | CHILCHOTA | Mexico | |
| | DES | Chilcotin Caribou Aviation | CHILCOTIN | Canada | |
| | CAD | Chilliwack Aviation | CHILLIWACKAIR | Canada | |
| | ETN | Chim-Nir Aviation | CHIMNIR | Israel | |
| CI | CAL | China Airlines | DYNASTY | Taiwan | |
| CK | CKK | China Cargo Airlines | CARGO KING | China | |
| MU | CES | China Eastern Airlines | CHINA EASTERN | China | |
| G5 | HXA | China Express Airlines | CHINA EXPRESS | China | |
| | CFA | China Flying Dragon Aviation | FEILONG | China | |
| | CTH | China General Aviation Corporation | TONGHANG | China | |
| | CAG | China National Aviation Corporation | CHINA NATIONAL | China | |
| CJ | CBF | China Northern Airlines | CHINA NORTHERN | China | Defunct |
| WH | CNW | China Northwest Airlines | CHINA NORTHWEST | China | Defunct |
| | CHC | China Ocean Helicopter Corporation | CHINA HELICOPTER | China | |
| 8Y | CYZ | China Postal Airlines | CHINA POST | China | |
| CZ | CSN | China Southern Airlines | CHINA SOUTHERN | China | |
| SZ | CXN | China Southwest Airlines | CHINA SOUTHWEST | China | Defunct |
| KN | CUA | China United Airlines | LIANHANG | China | |
| XO | CXH | China Xinhua Airlines | XINHUA | China | |
| 3Q | CYH | China Yunnan Airlines | YUNNAN | China | Defunct |
| | CGU | Chinguetti Airlines | CHINGUETTI | Mauritania | |
| | CEP | Chipola Aviation | CHIPOLA | United States | |
| | CPW | Chippewa Air Commuter | CHIPPEWA-AIR | United States | |
| X7 | CHF | Chitaavia | CHITA | Russia | |
| OQ | CQN | Chongqing Airlines | CHONG QING | China | |
| | CAS | Christman Air System | CHRISTMAN | United States | |
| | OEC | Christophorus Flugrettungsverein | CHRISTOPHORUS | Austria | |
| | CHO | Chrome Air Services | CHROME AIR | United States | |
| | CHU | Church Aircraft | CHURCHAIR | United States | |
| A2 | CIU | Cielos Airlines | CIELOS | Peru | |
| QI | CIM | Cimber Sterling | CIMBER | Denmark | |
| C7 | CIN | Cinnamon Air | CINNAMON | Sri Lanka | |
| | RRU | Cirrus | HELICIRRUS | Chile | Defunct |
| | NTS | Cirrus Air | NITE STAR | United States | |
| C9 | RUS | Cirrus Airlines | CIRRUS AIR | Germany | Defunct |
| | JTI | Cirrus Middle East | | Lebanon | |
| | FIV | CitationAir | FIVE STAR | United States | |
| | XCX | Citibank | | United States | |
| | HZX | Citic General Aviation | ZHONGXIN | China | |
| QZ | CTV | Citilink | SUPERGREEN | Indonesia | |
| | SDR | City Airline | SWEDESTAR | Sweden | |
| G3 | CIX | City Connexion Airlines | CONNEXION | Burundi | Defunct |
| | XBG | City of Bangor | | United States | |
| WX | BCY | CityJet | CITY-IRELAND | Ireland | |
| | CAQ | Cityair (Chester) Limited | AIR CHESTER | United Kingdom | |
| | CII | Cityfly | CITYFLY | Italy | |
| CJ | CFE | CityFlyer Express | FLYER | United Kingdom | Defunct; ICAO code in use by BA CityFlyer |
| | CNB | Cityline Hungary | CITYHUN | Hungary | |
| | HSR | Citylink Airlines | HOOSIER | United States | |
| | CIW | Civair Airways | CIVFLIGHT | South Africa | |
| | CAP | Civil Air Patrol | CAP | United States | |
| CT | CAT | Civil Air Transport | Mandarin | Taiwan | Defunct |
| | CIA | Civil Aviation Authority | CALIMERA | Slovakia | |
| | CIV | Civil Aviation Authority of New Zealand | CIVAIR | New Zealand | |
| | CBA | Civil Aviation Inspectorate of the Czech Republic | CALIBRA | Czech Republic | |
| | FMC | Claessens International Limited | CLAESSENS | United Kingdom | |
| | CLK | Clark Aviation | CLARKAIR | United States | |
| | CSF | Clasair | CALEDONIAN | United Kingdom | |
| | CLY | Clay Lacy Aviation | CLAY-LACY | United States | |
| | CGK | Click Airways | CLICK AIR | Kyrgyzstan | |
| | CLZ | Cloud 9 Air Charters | CLOUDLINE | South Africa | |
| | CLD | Clowes Estates Limited | CLOWES | United Kingdom | |
| | SDJ | Club 328 | SPACEJET | United Kingdom | |
| 6P | ISG | Club Air | CLUBAIR | Italy | |
| BX | CST | Coast Air | COAST CENTER | Norway | |
| DQ | | Coastal Air | U.S. Virgin Islands | United States | |
| | TCL | Coastal Air Transport | TRANS COASTAL | United States | Escape Aviation |
| | CNG | Coastal Airways | SID-AIR | United States | |
| | CSV | Coastal Travels | COASTAL TRAVEL | Tanzania | |
| | CHL | Cohlmia Aviation | COHLMIA | United States | |
| | OLR | Colaéreos | COLAEREOS | Ecuador | |
| | CLE | Colemill Enterprises | COLEMILL | United States | |
| 9L | CJC | Colgan Air | COLGAN | United States | |
| | CAE | Colibri Aviation | HUMMINGBIRD | Canada | |
| YD | CAT | Cologne Air Transport GmbH | | Germany | Defunct since 1996 |
| | CCX | Colt International | | United States | |
| | WCO | Columbia Helicopters | COLUMBIA HELI | United States | |
| | KLR | Columbus Air Transport | KAY-LER | United States | |
| | GHP | Colvin Aviation | GRASSHOPPER EX | United States | |
| OH | COM | Comair | COMAIR | United States | |
| MN | CAW | Comair | COMMERCIAL | South Africa | |
| | GCM | Comair Flight Services | GLOBECOM | South Africa | |
| | CDE | Comed Group | COMEX | United Kingdom | |
| | CVV | Comeravia | COMERAVIA | Venezuela | |
| | CRS | Comercial Aérea | COMERCIAL AEREA | Mexico | |
| | CMG | Comet Airlines | SUNSPY | Nigeria | |
| | FYN | Comfort Air | FLYNN | Germany | |
| | CMJ | Comfort Jet Services | COMFORT JET | Togo | |
| | CLA | Comlux Aviation | COMLUX | Switzerland | |
| | KAZ | Comlux Kazakhstan | KAZLUX | Kazakhstan | |
| | MLM | Comlux Malta | LUXMALTA | Malta | |
| | CXB | Comlux Aruba | STARLUX | Aruba | |
| | CMH | Commair Aviation | COMMODORE | United Kingdom | |
| | CTM | Commandement Du Transport Aerien Militaire Francais | COTAM | France | |
| | CML | Commander Air Charter | COMMANDAIR | Canada | |
| | CRM | Commander Mexicana | COMMANDERMEX | Mexico | |
| | CME | Commerce Bank | COMMERCE BANK | United States | (Kansas City) Allocated in 2014 |
| | CMS | Commercial Aviation | ACCESS | Canada | |
| | GAR | Commodore Aviation | | Australia | |
| | CJS | Commonwealth Jet Service | COMMONWEALTH | United States | |
| C5 | UCA | CommutAir | COMMUTAIR | United States | |
| KR | CWK | Comores Airlines | CONTICOM | Comoros | |
| | CGR | Compagnia Generale Ripreseaeree | COMPRIP | Italy | |
| | CMM | Compagnie Aérienne du Mali | CAMALI | Mali | |
| | CPM | Compagnie Mauritanienne Des Transports | | Mauritania | |
| | GIC | Compagnie de Bauxites de Guinee | CEBEGE | Guinea | |
| | AIF | Compañía Aérea de Valencia | | Spain | |
| | ATF | Compañía Aerotécnicas Fotográficas | AEROTECNICAS | Spain | |
| | LCT | Compañía De Actividades Y Servicios De Aviación | STELLAIR | Spain | |
| | EJV | Compania Ejecutiva | EJECUTIVA | Mexico | |
| | HSE | Compania Helicopteros Del Sureste | HELISURESTE | Spain | |
| | MDR | Compania Mexicana De Aeroplanos | AEROPLANOS | Mexico | |
| | HSS | Compañía Transportes Aéreos Del Sur | TAS HELICOPTEROS | Spain | |
| | TAV | Compañía de Servicios Aéreos Tavisa | TAVISA | Spain | |
| | CYF | Company Flight | COMPANY FLIGHT | Denmark | |
| CP | CPZ | Compass Airlines | COMPASS ROSE | United States | |
| | CPS | Compass International Airways | COMPASS | United Kingdom | |
| | XCO | Compuflight Operations Service | | United States | |
| | XCS | Compuserve Incorporated | | United States | |
| | CRC | Conair Aviation | CONAIR-CANADA | Canada | |
| | COD | Concordavia | CONCORDAVIA | Ukraine | |
| | CNR | Condor Aero Services | CONAERO | United States | |
| | CIB | Condor | CONDOR BERLIN | Germany | |
| DE | CFG | Condor Flugdienst | CONDOR | Germany | |
| | COF | Confort Air | CONFORT | Canada | |
| | CAK | Congo Air | | Bahamas | |
| | CGA | Congressional Air | CONGRESSIONAL | United States | |
| | ROY | Conifair Aviation | | Canada | |
| | CCT | Connect Air | CONNECT | Canada | Allocated in 2014 |
| | BSN | Connectair Charters | BASTION | Canada | |
| | CAC | Conquest Airlines | CONQUEST AIR | United States | |
| | CXO | Conroe Aviation Services | CONROE AIR | United States | |
| | VCH | Consorcio Helitec | CONSORCIO HELITEC | Venezuela | |
| | UZA | Constanta Airline | CONSTANTA | Ukraine | |
| | KIS | Contactair | CONTACTAIR | Germany | |
| | XCL | Contel ASC | | United States | |
| CO | COA | Continental Airlines | CONTINENTAL | United States | ICAO Code and callsign withdrawn, merged with United Airlines |
| CO | | Continental Express | JETLINK | United States | |
| CS | CMI | Continental Micronesia | AIR MIKE | United States | |
| | CON | Continental Oil | CONOCO | United States | |
| CS | CS | Cambrian Airways | Cambrian | United Kingdom | Defunct 1974 |
| V0 | VCV | Conviasa | CONVIASA | Venezuela | |
| | CKA | Cook Inlet Aviation | COOK-AIR | United States | |
| | SVY | Cooper Aerial Surveys | SURVEYOR | United Kingdom | |
| CM | CMP | Copa Airlines | COPA | Panama | |
| | CAT | Copenhagen Air Taxi | AIRCAT | Denmark | |
| | COP | Copper State Air Service | COPPER STATE | United States | |
| | AAQ | Copterline | COPTERLINE | Finland | Former name: Copter Action; former callsign: COPTER ACTION |
| CQ | CCW | Central Charter | CENTRAL CHARTER | Czech Republic | |
| XC | CAI | Corendon Airlines | CORENDON | Turkey | Turistik Hava Tasimacilik |
| CD | CND | Corendon Dutch Airlines | DUTCH CORENDON | Netherlands | |
| XR | CXI | Corendon Airlines Europe | TOURISTIC | Malta | Touristic Aviation |
| | CRA | Coronado Aerolíneas | CORAL | Colombia | |
| | CPB | Corpac Canada | PENTA | Canada | |
| | CNC | Corporación Aéreo Cencor | CENCOR | Mexico | |
| | CPG | Corporacion Aeroangeles | CORPORANG | Mexico | |
| | CGY | Corporacion Paraguaya De Aeronautica | | Paraguay | |
| | CPT | Corporate Air | AIR SPUR | United States | |
| | CPR | Corporate Air | CORPAIR | United States | |
| | CPO | Corporate Aircraft Company | MOKAN | United States | |
| | COO | Corporate Airlink | CORPORATE | Canada | |
| | CKE | Corporate Aviation Services | CHECKMATE | United States | |
| | VHT | Corporate Flight International | VEGAS HEAT | United States | |
| LF | VTE | Contour Airlines | VOLUNTEER | United States | |
| | CJI | Corporate Jets | SEA JET | United States | |
| SS | CRL | Corsairfly | CORSAIR | France | |
| XK | CCM | Corse Méditerranée | CORSICA | France | Name changed to Air Corsica |
| F5 | COZ | Cosmic Air | COSMIC AIR | Nepal | |
| | COT | Costa Airlines | COAIR | Venezuela | Defunct |
| GW | CRG | Costa Rica Green Airways | | Costa Rica | |
| | CHI | Cougar Helicopters | COUGAR | Canada | |
| | MGB | Coulson Flying Service | MOCKINGBIRD | United Kingdom | |
| | NSW | Country Connection Airlines | | Australia | |
| | CIK | Country International Airlines | COUNTRY AIR | Kyrgyzstan | Defunct |
| | CSD | Courier Services | DELIVERY | United States | |
| | CUT | Court Helicopters | COURT AIR | South Africa | |
| | OU | Court Line | COURTLINE | United Kingdom | Defunct |
| | CVL | Coval Air | COVAL | Canada | |
| | COW | COWI | COWI | Denmark | |
| 7C | COY | Coyne Aviation | COYNE AIR | United Kingdom | |
| | CFD | Cranfield University | AERONAUT | United Kingdom | |
| | CRE | Cree Airways | CREE AIR | Canada | |
| | ELM | Crelam | CRELAM | Mexico | |
| | CAN | Crest Aviation | CREST | United Kingdom | |
| | KRM | Crimea Universal Avia | TRANS UNIVERSAL | Ukraine | |
| OU | CTN | Croatia Airlines | CROATIA | Croatia | |
| | HRZ | Croatian Air Force | CROATIAN AIRFORCE | Croatia | |
| | CRX | Cross Aviation | CROSSAIR | United Kingdom | |
| QE | ECC | Crossair Europe | Cigogne | Switzerland | |
| | CWX | Crow Executive Air | CROW EXPRESS | United States | |
| | CKR | Crown Air Systems | CROWN AIR | United States | |
| | CRO | Crown Airways | CROWN AIRWAYS | United States | |
| | CRW | Crownair | REGAL | Canada | |
| | VCR | Cruiser Linhas Aéreas | VOE CRUISER | Brazil | |
| | CTY | Cryderman Air Service | CENTURY | United States | |
| | CYT | Crystal Shamrock Airlines | CRYSTAL-AIR | United States | |
| | IRO | CSA Air | IRON AIR | United States | |
| CU | CUB | Cubana de Aviación | CUBANA | Cuba | |
| | CTF | Cutter Aviation | CUTTER FLIGHT | United States | |
| | CBL | Cumberland Airways (Nicholson Air Service) | CUMBERLAND | United States | |
| | CTT | Custom Air Transport | CATT | United States | |
| | RGN | Cygnus Air | CYGNUS AIR | Spain | |
| | CYC | Cyprair Tours | CYPRAIR | Cyprus | |
| | CYS | Cypress Airlines | SKYBIRD | Canada | |
| CY | CYP | Cyprus Airways | CYPRUS | Cyprus | |
| YK | KYV | Cyprus Turkish Airlines | AIRKIBRIS | Turkey | Ceased operations 2010 |
| | CEF | Czech Air Force | CZECH AIR FORCE | Czech Republic | |
| | AHD | Czech Air Handling | AIRHANDLING | Czech Republic | |
| OK | CSA | Czech Airlines | CSA-LINES | Czech Republic | |
| | CIE | Czech Government Flying Service | CZECH REPUBLIC | Czech Republic | |
| 8L | CGP | Cargo Plus Aviation | | United Arab Emirates | |
| | HNL | CHC Helicopters Netherlands | MAPLELEAF | Netherlands | |
| 5Z | KEM | CemAir | CEMAIR | South Africa | |
| | JLH | Centro de Servicio Aeronautico | CESA | Mexico | |
| | FCB | Cobalt | NEW AGE | Cyprus | |
| | CVK | CAVOK Airlines | CARGO LINE | Ukraine | |
| XG | CLI | Clickair | CLICKJET | Spain | Merge into Vueling |
| PN | CHB | West Air (China) | WEST CHINA | China | |
| | CRN | Carson Air Ltd | CARSON | Canada | Air ambulance operator |

== IATA Traffic Conference Areas ==
The International Air Transport Association (IATA) divides the world into three areas called the Traffic Conference Areas (TCAs) for air travel purposes. These areas are used to define geographical boundaries for fare construction and other industry-related practices:

- Traffic Conference Area 1 (TC1) – this area includes the Americas, encompassing North America (the Caribbean, Central America, and Northern America) and South America.
- Traffic Conference Area 2 (TC2) – this area includes the EMEA region, encompassing Europe, the Middle East, and Africa (North Africa and Sub-Saharan Africa).
- Traffic Conference Area 3 (TC3) – this area includes the Asia–Pacific region, encompassing the rest of Asia (Central Asia, East Asia, North Asia, South Asia, and Southeast Asia) and Oceania.

Essentially, TC1 covers the "New World", while TC2 and TC3 together cover the "Old World" (Africa-Eurasia) and the "Land Down Under".

== See also ==
- IATA airport code
- ICAO airport code
