= Click =

Click or Klick may refer to:

== Airlines ==
- Click Airways, a UAE airline
- Clickair, a Spanish airline
- MexicanaClick, a Mexican airline

== Art, entertainment, and media ==
=== Fictional characters ===
- Klicks, alien race in Star Drive
- Click, minor character in The Rock-afire Explosion Music Stage Show

=== Film ===
- Click (2006 film), an American comedy starring Adam Sandler
- Click (2010 film), a Hindi horror film
- Click (2024 film), an Indian Kannada-language comedy drama film

=== Music ===
- Click track
- Le Click, German Eurodance duo
- The Click (band), American hip hop group

==== Releases ====
- The Click (album), a 2017 album by pop band AJR
- "Click" (ClariS song), 2014
- "Click" (Charli XCX song), 2019
- "Click" (Jisoo song), 2026
- "The Click", a song by Good Charlotte from Good Charlotte
- "Click", a song by Anahí, Ale Sergi and Jay de la Cueva
- "Click", a song by Little Boots from Hands

=== Print ===
- Click (comics)
- Click (novel)
- Click!, a Romanian newspaper
- Click, a science magazine for children by the publishers of Spider
- "Click", a short story by R. L. Stine in the book Tales to Give You Goosebumps
- Click, a now-defunct general interest magazine published by Triangle Publications

=== Radio ===
- Click (radio programme)
- Click of Click and Clack, hosts of Car Talk

=== Television ===
- Click (Canadian TV series), an instructional series
- Click (game show)
- Click (Philippine TV series), a teen drama
- Click (TV programme), a news programme about technology
- The Click (Hacks), the sixteenth episode of Hacks
- "Click", a season 3 Goosebumps episode
- "Klick" (Better Call Saul), the season 2 finale of Better Call Saul

== Computing ==
- Apache Click, a web application framework
- Clik!, a disk drive
- Point and click, a gesture made with a computer input device such as a mouse
- ClickSoftware, a software company now owned by Salesforce
- Click, a package manager used by Ubuntu Touch

== Organizations ==
- Clicks (South Africa), a South African healthcare, personal care, and cosmetics retail chain
- Click! Network, a cable TV and Internet provider in Washington State, United States

== People ==
- Click Bishop (born 1957), American politician
- Danny Click (born 1960), American singer-songwriter and guitarist
- Gary Click (born 1965), American politician
- James Click (born 1978), American baseball executive
- Shannan Click (born 1983), American model

== Other uses ==
- Click, Llano County, Texas, United States
- Click chemistry, a chemical philosophy
- Click consonant, a speech sound
- Click track, used in audio recording
- Click (acoustics), a sonic artifact
- Heart click, a cardiac symptom
- Hyundai Click, a car
- Click (brand), a house brand of Bunnings Warehouse
- Snap (fingers), the act of creating a cracking sound with one's fingers
- A component of a ratchet
- A subsidiary retail chain of Acme Fresh Market
- Klick, U.S. military slang for a kilometer
- Klick Photoshop, a brand of Timpson (retailer), UK
- Click Asia Summit, a congress

== See also ==
- Klik (disambiguation)
- Clique (disambiguation)
