= CPH =

CPH, CpH, Cph, or cph may refer to:

- California State Polytechnic University, Humboldt, public university in Arcata, California
- Castle Peak Hospital, the oldest and largest psychiatric hospital in Tuen Mun, Hong Kong
- Board Certified in Public Health (CPH), USA
- Cleveland Play House, US theatre
- In Copenhagen, Denmark:
  - CPH:PIX film festival
  - CPH:DOX film festival
  - Copenhagen Airport, IATA code
- Champagne Airlines, ICAO code
- Chronic paroxysmal hemicrania, a type of headache
- Chronic persistent hepatitis
- Communistische Partij Holland, former Netherlands political party
- cph Deutschland, Chemie- Produktions- und Handelsgesellschaft mbH, adhesives company, Essen, Germany
- Concordia Publishing House, publisher of The Lutheran Church—Missouri Synod
- CPH railmotor, a diesel train in Australia
- Cyclopentadiene, C_{5}H_{6} (the cyclopentadienyl radical, C_{5}H_{5}, is often abbreviated Cp)
- Champa Junction railway station (station code: CPH) in Chhattisgarh, India
