= Cliq =

Cliq may refer to:

- Motorola Cliq, a mobile phone
- Tata Cliq, an e-commerce company

== See also ==
- Clique (disambiguation)
- The Kliq, a group of professional wrestlers
