= Airbus Corporate Jets =

Business unit of Airbus that sells corporate jet variants of parent's airliner range

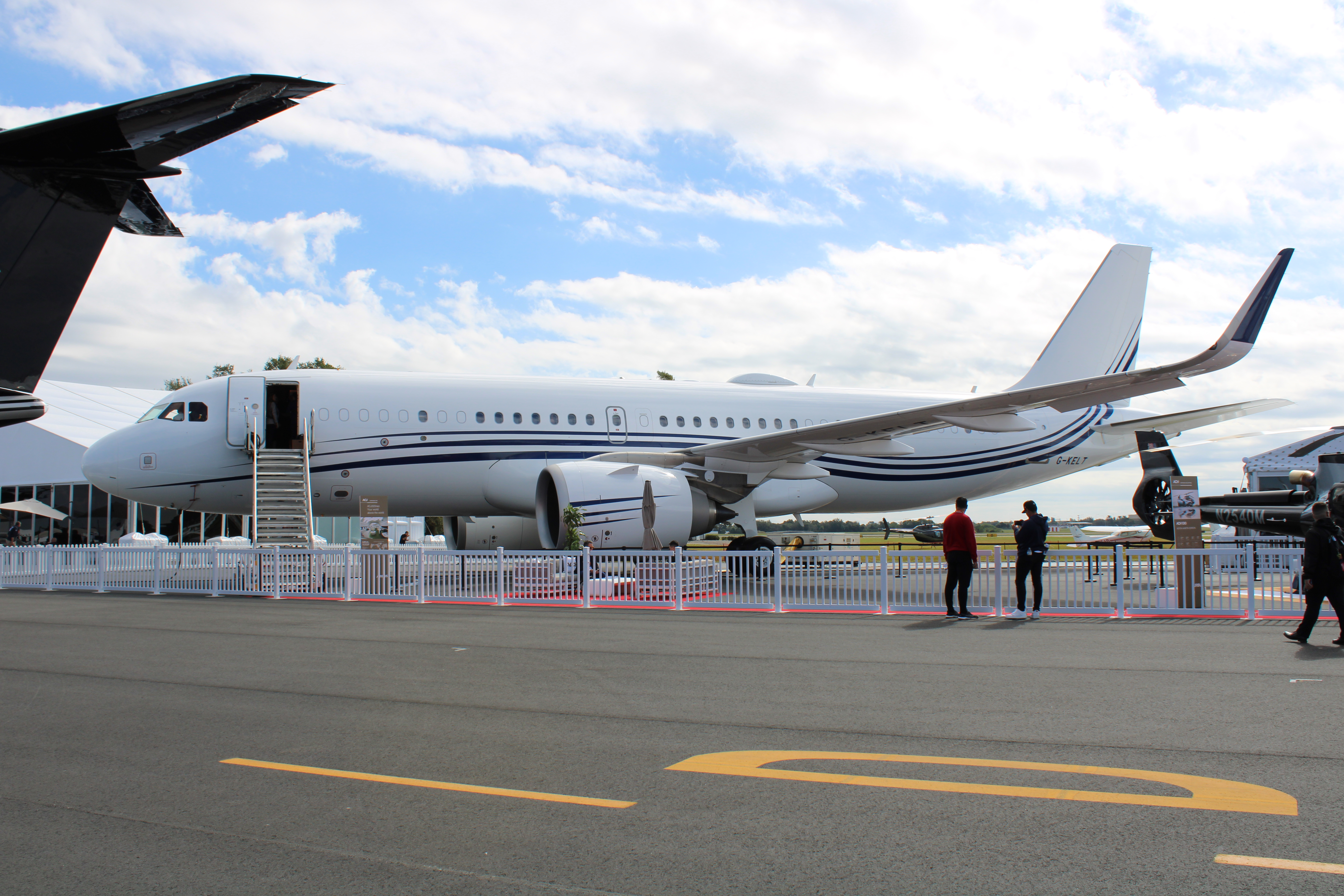
- An ACJ320 being exhibited in 2022

General information
- Type: Business jet
- Manufacturer: Airbus

Airbus Corporate Jets (ACJ) is a business unit of Airbus which markets and completes business jet variants of the company’s airliners. Following the entry of the 737-based Boeing Business Jet into the market, Airbus introduced the A319-based Airbus Corporate Jet in 1997. Although the term Airbus Corporate Jet was initially used only for the A319CJ, it is now used for all models in a VIP configuration. As of June 2019, 213 corporate and private jets are operating; 222 aircraft have been ordered, including 128 A320-family jets.

The Airbus Corporate Jet Centre is based in Toulouse, France, and specialises in single-aisle aircraft.

== Narrow-body aircraft ==
The ACJ family is based on the A320 family of aircraft, beginning with the A319CJ. Today any version of the A320 is available as a corporate jet with a 180-minute ETOPS rating. Changes over the passenger versions include an increase in service ceiling to 41,000 ft (12,000 m) and the use of a variable number of removable additional fuel tanks.

=== ACJ318 ===
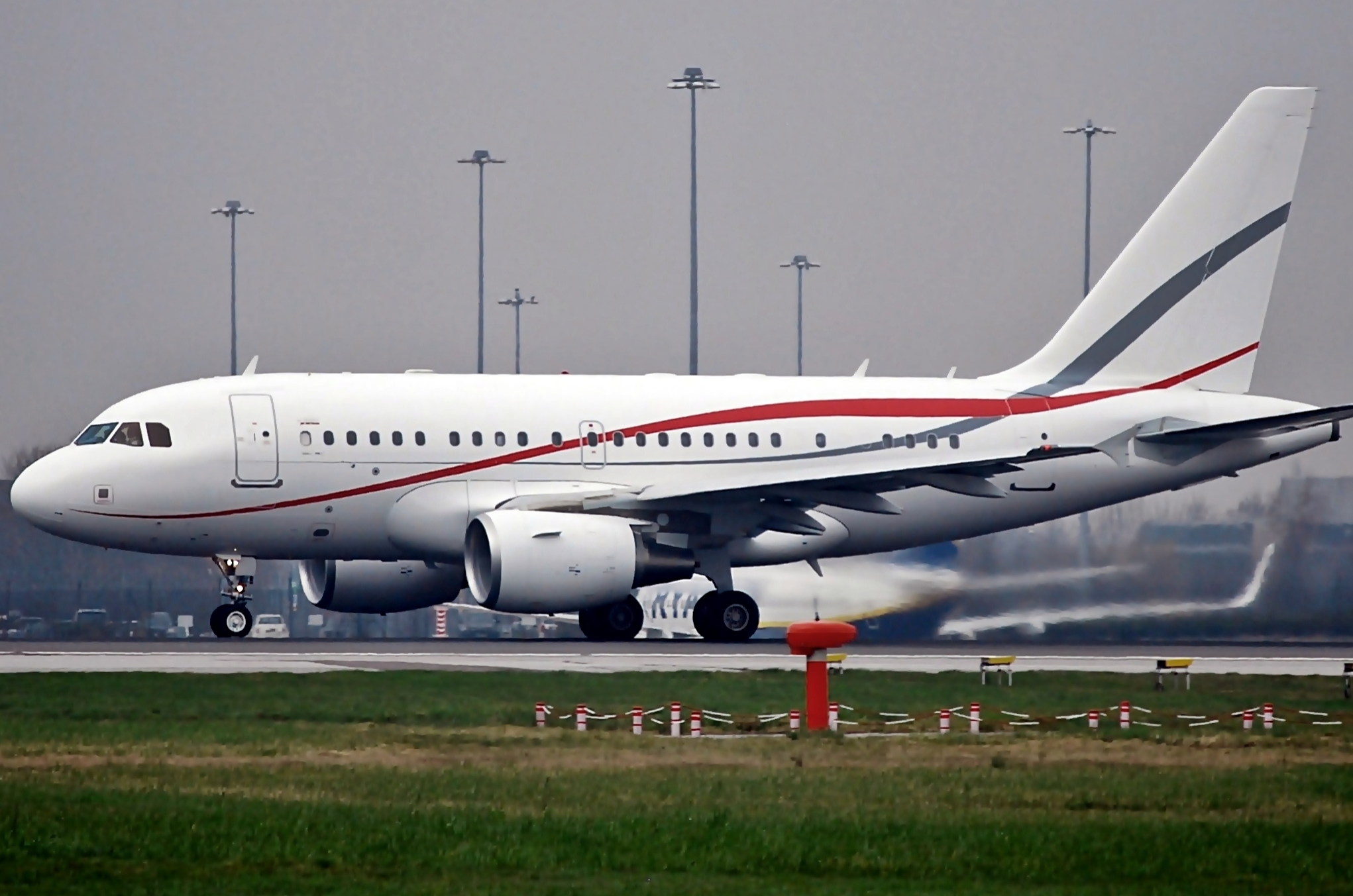
A privately-owned Airbus A318. The A318 is heavy utilized as a business jet.

The ACJ318 offered a range of 4,200 nmi or 7,800 km. The smallest of the ACJ family, based on the passenger A318, was offered in passenger configurations between 14 and 18 passengers.

=== ACJ319 ===
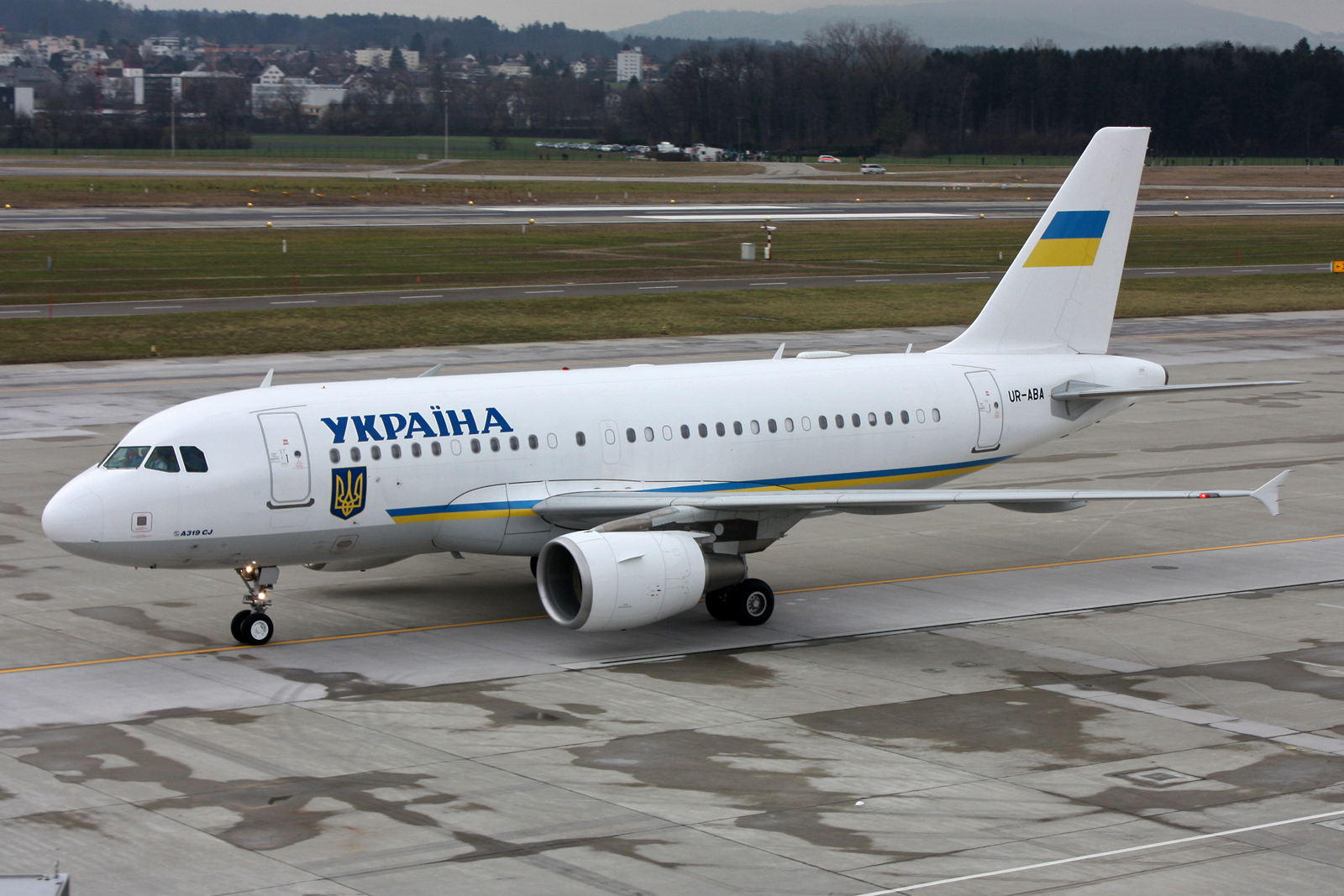
An A319 CJ of the Ukrainian government.

The ACJ319 offered a range of 6,000 nmi or 11,100 km. This model is the corporate jet version of the A319. It incorporates removable extra fuel tanks which are installed in the cargo compartment, and an increased service ceiling of 12,000 m (39,000 ft). Upon resale the aircraft can be reconfigured as a standard A319 by removing its extra tanks, thus maximizing its resale value. Certificated by both the European JAA and American FAA, the A319LR and ACJ are the only business jets approved for public transport on both sides of the Atlantic. In 2018, its unit cost was $105M.

The aircraft seats between 19 and 50 passengers but may be outfitted by the customers into any configuration. DC Aviation, UB Group, and Reliance Industries are among its users. The A319CJ competes with the Boeing BBJ1, Gulfstream G550, and Bombardier Global Express. Because of its wider fuselage diameter, it offers a roomier interior than its competitors. It is powered by the same engine types as the A320, either the CFM International CFM56-5 or the V2527.

The A319CJ was used by the Escadron de transport, d'entrainement et de calibration which is in charge of transportation for France's government officials, and was also ordered by the Flugbereitschaft of the Luftwaffe for the transport of German government officials. Since 2003, an ACJ is a presidential aircraft of Armenia, Brazil, the Czech Republic, Italy, Malaysia, Pakistan, Slovakia, Thailand, Turkey, Ukraine and Venezuela.

=== ACJ320 ===
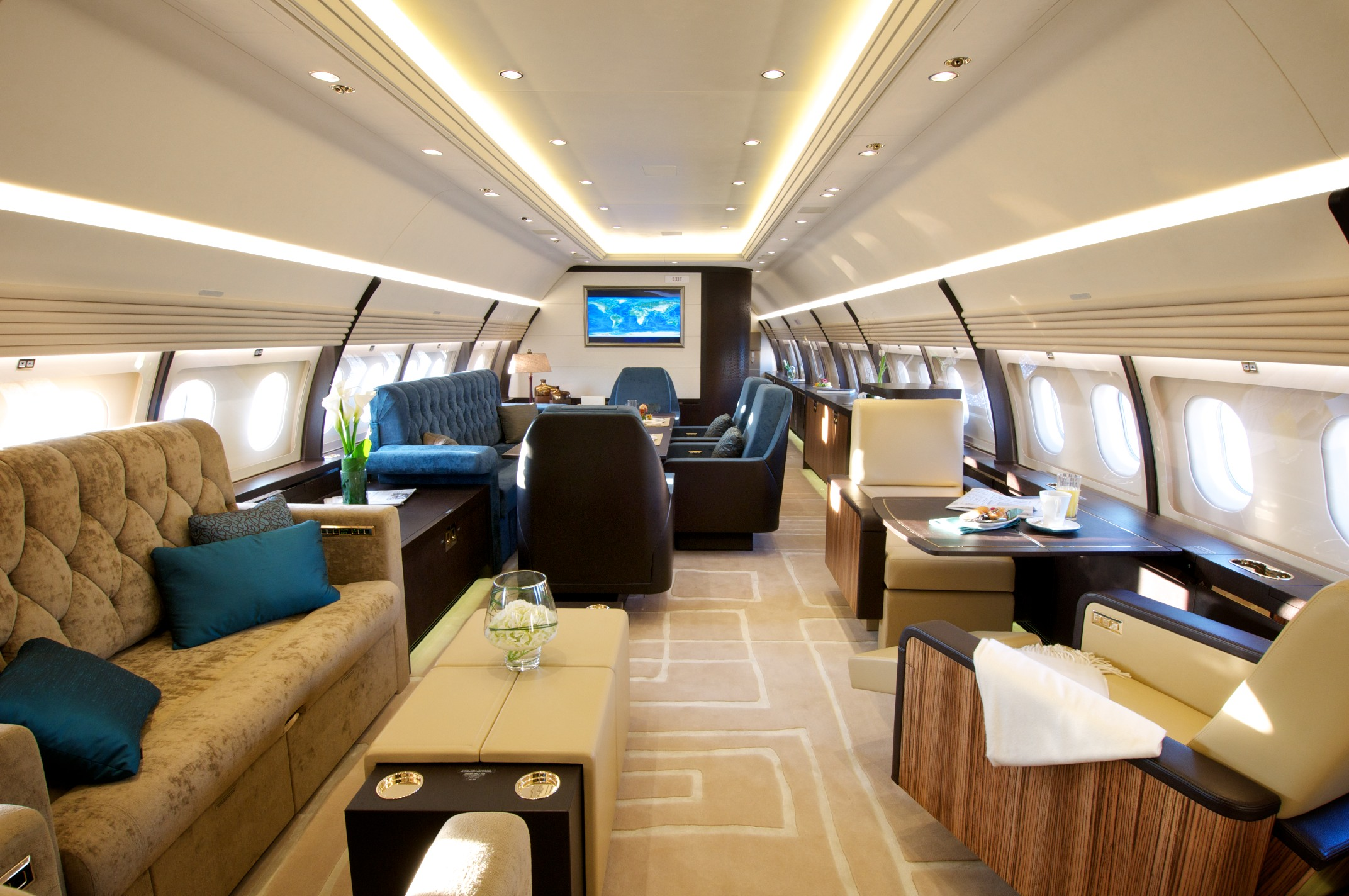
ACJ320 cabin

The ACJ320 offered a range of 4,300 nmi or 7,800 km. The A320 Prestige is offered as a variant for passengers who want more interior space than the A319 offers. It has a passenger capacity of 30, with two removable fuel tanks. In 2018, its unit cost was $115M.

=== ACJ321 ===
The A321 is the largest narrow-body corporate jet with a full passenger range of 4,200 nmi (4,800 mi; 7,800 km).

=== ACJneo ===
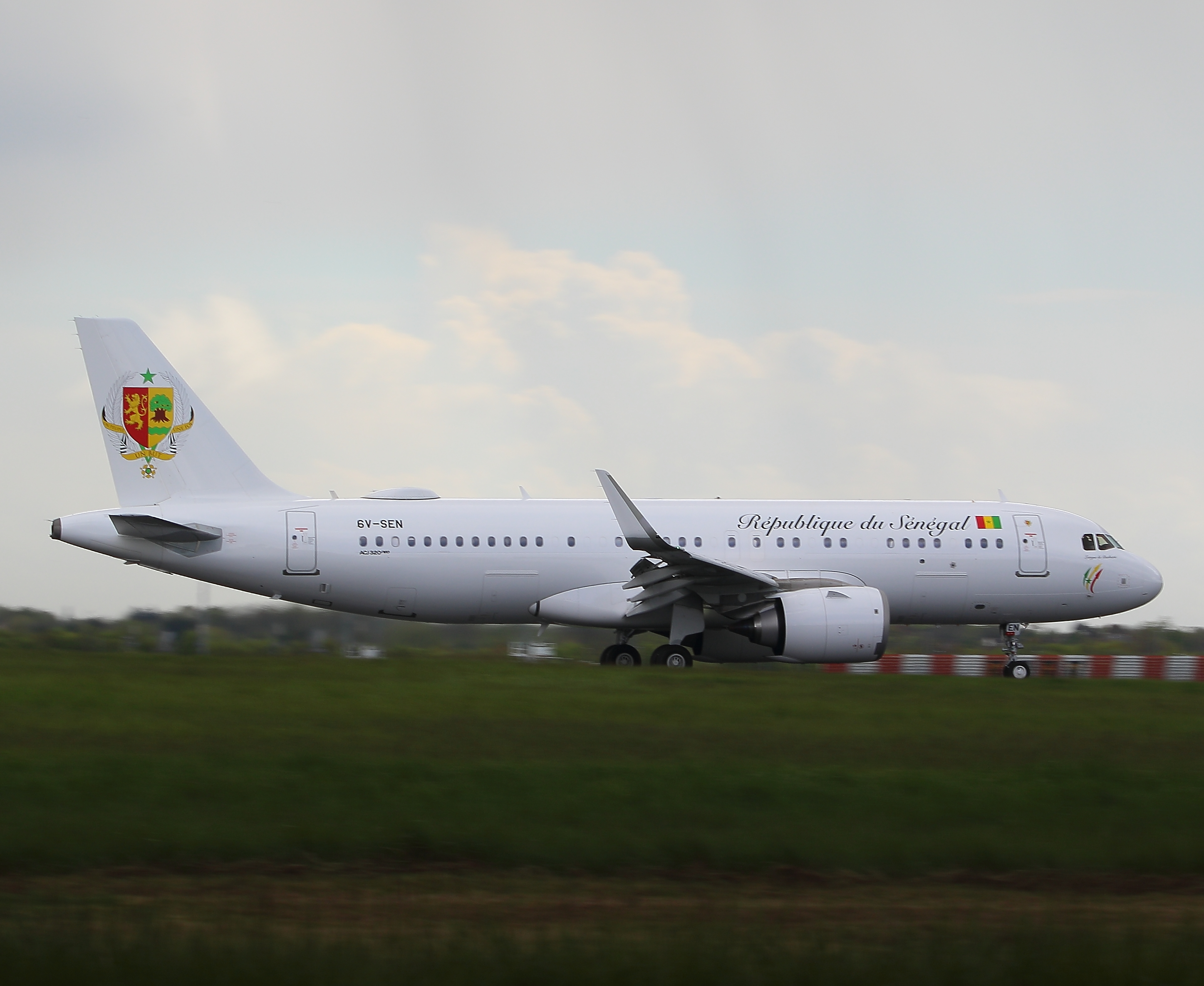
An ACJ320neo serving the Government of Senegal.

Two A320neo family variants are offered: the ACJ319neo, carrying eight passengers up to 6,750 nmi (7,770 mi; 12,500 km), and the ACJ320neo, carrying 25 up to 6,000 nmi (6,900 mi; 11,000 km). The CFM LEAP or Pratt & Whitney PW1000G lower fuel-burn provides additional range along with lower engine noise while the cabin altitude does not exceed 6,400 ft (2,000 m). To increase its fuel capacity, the ACJ319neo is offered with up to five additional centre tanks (ACT).

The ACJ320neo first flight was on 16 November 2018, starting a short test programme for the extra fuel tanks and greater cabin pressurisation. It was first delivered to Acropolis Aviation on 16 January 2019. On 25 April 2019, the ACJ319neo completed its first flight, before a short test campaign and delivery to German K5 Aviation, outfitted with five ACTs. The CFM Leap-powered ACJ319neo was certified by the EASA on 9 July. In 2023, the equipped price of the ACJ319neo was $107.5M, and $117M for the ACJ320neo.

=== ACJ321LR ===
Long-range neo variant. The ACJ321LR has a range of 8,175 nmi (15,140 km) which is the longest range of any narrowbody plane.

=== ACJ TwoTwenty ===
In October 2020, Airbus announced an ACJ variant of the A220-100, to be known as the ACJ TwoTwenty, with a range of 5,650 nmi (6,500 mi; 10,460 km) and cabin space of 73 m^{2} (790 sq ft) for 18 passengers. To increase its range the ACJ Two twenty is offered with up to five removable auxiliary centre tanks (ACT).

The ACJ TwoTwenty made its first flight on 14 December 2021, before delivery to Comlux to be outfitted with a VIP cabin in Indianapolis. In 2022, its equipped price was $80M. The first aircraft was delivered on 28 April 2023.

=== Specifications ===
Variant	ACJ318	ACJ319neo	ACJ320neo	ACJ321	ACJ TwoTwenty
VIP pax	8		25	8	18
Wingspan	35.8 m (117 ft 5 in)				35.1 m (115 ft 2 in)
Height	12.56 m (41 ft 2 in)	11.76 m (38 ft 7 in)			11.50 m (37 ft 9 in)
Length	31.45 m (103 ft 2 in)	33.84 m (111 ft 0 in)	37.57 m (123 ft 3 in)	44.51 m (146 ft 0 in)	35.00 m (114 ft 10 in)
Fuselage width	3.95 m (13 ft 0 in)				3.5 m (11 ft 6 in)
Cabin height	2.25 m (7 ft 5 in)				2.11 m (6 ft 11 in)
Cabin length	21.62 m (70 ft 11 in)	24.01 m (78 ft 9 in)	27.74 m (91 ft 0 in)	34.44 m (113 ft 0 in)	23.8 m (78 ft 1 in)
Cabin width	3.70 m (12 ft 2 in)				3.28 m (10 ft 9 in)
Cabin area	74.2 m^{2} (799 sq ft)	83 m^{2} (890 sq ft)	96 m^{2} (1,030 sq ft)	121 m^{2} (1,300 sq ft)	73 m^{2} (790 sq ft)
MTOW	68.0 t (149,900 lb)	78.2 t (172,000 lb)	79.0 t (174,200 lb)	93.5 t (206,000 lb)	63.73 t (140,500 lb)
Maximum fuel	24,210 L (6,400 US gal; 5,330 imp gal)	37,400 L (9,900 US gal; 8,200 imp gal) (Note: 5 ACT)	34,354 L (9,075 US gal; 7,557 imp gal) (Note: 4 ACT)	32,900 L (8,700 US gal; 7,200 imp gal)	28,570 L (7,550 US gal; 6,280 imp gal)
Engines	CFM56-5B, 68.3 in (1.73 m) fan	ceo: CFM56-5B or IAE V2500A5, 63.5 in (1.61 m) fan neo: LEAP-1A or PW1100G			Pratt & Whitney PW1500G
Thrust (×2)	96–106 kN (22,000–24,000 lb_{f})	98.3 kN (22,100 lb_{f})	98–120 kN (22,000–27,000 lb_{f})	120–148 kN (27,000–33,000 lb_{f})	84.1–103.6 kN (18,900–23,300 lb_{f})
Max speed	Mach 0.82 (471 kn; 542 mph; 872 km/h)				
Range	7,800 km (4,200 nmi)	12,500 km (6,750 nmi)	11,100 km (6,000 nmi)	7,800 km (4,200 nmi)	10,460 km (5,650 nmi)
Takeoff	1,780 m (5,840 ft)	1,850 m (6,070 ft)	2,100 m (6,900 ft)	2,430 m (7,970 ft)	1,463 m (4,800 ft)
Landing	1,230 m (4,040 ft)	1,360 m (4,460 ft)	1,500 m (4,900 ft)	1,630 m (5,350 ft)	1,387 m (4,551 ft)
Ceiling	12,500 m (41,000 ft)			11,900 m (39,000 ft)	12,500 m (41,000 ft)

== Wide-body aircraft ==
The VIP widebodies are based on the A330/A340/A350/A380 aircraft. Additional fuel tanks extend the range, with the greatest increase for the A330 Prestige.

=== ACJ330-200 ===
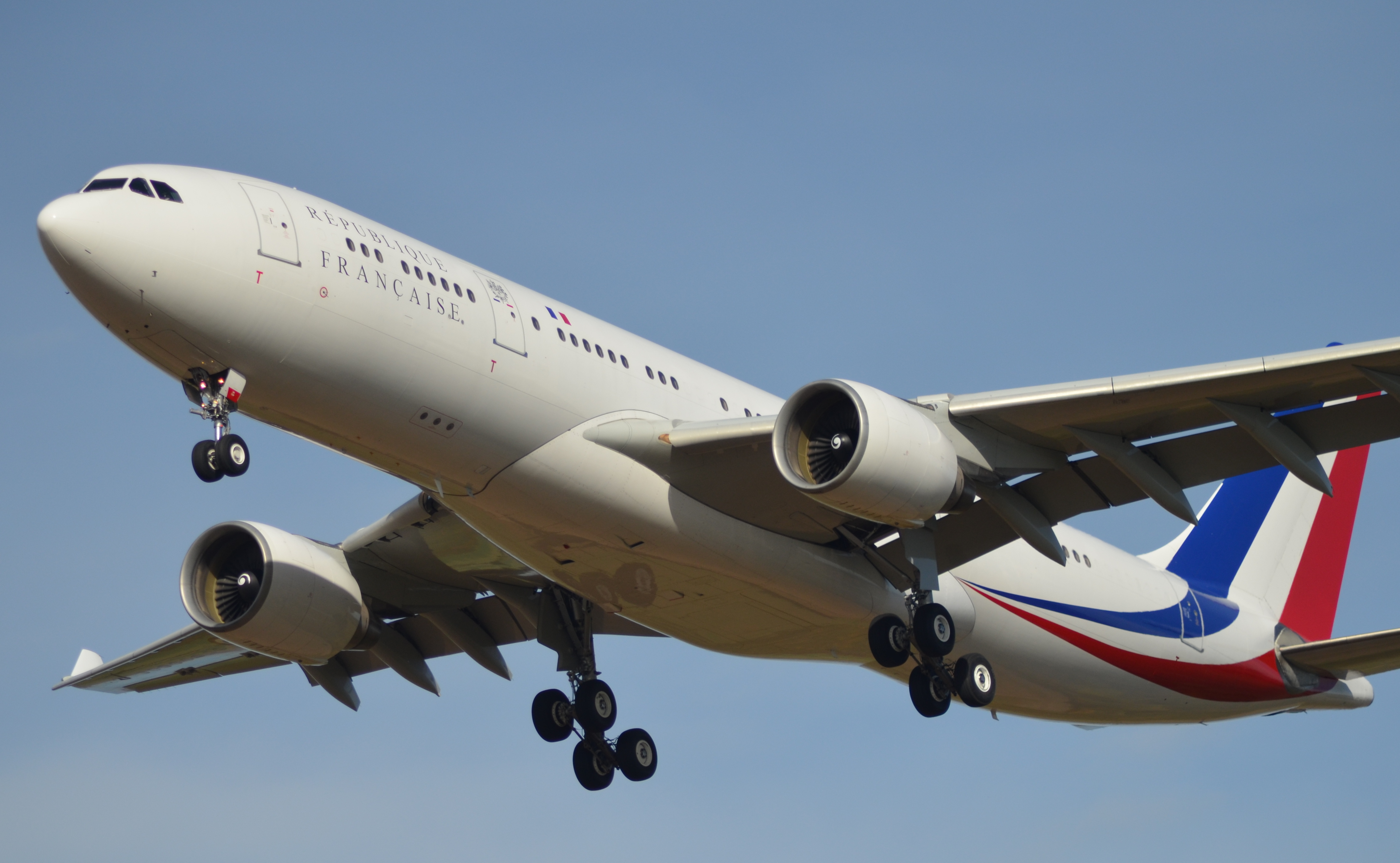
French Air Force Airbus A330-200

The A330-200 Prestige offers space for 60 passengers with a range of 8,300 nmi (15,400 km; 9,600 mi).

=== ACJ330neo ===
The ACJ330neo is based on the new A330neo with the "Harmony" cabin concept. It has a capacity of 25 passengers and a range of 10,400 nmi (19,260 km).

=== ACJ340-300 ===
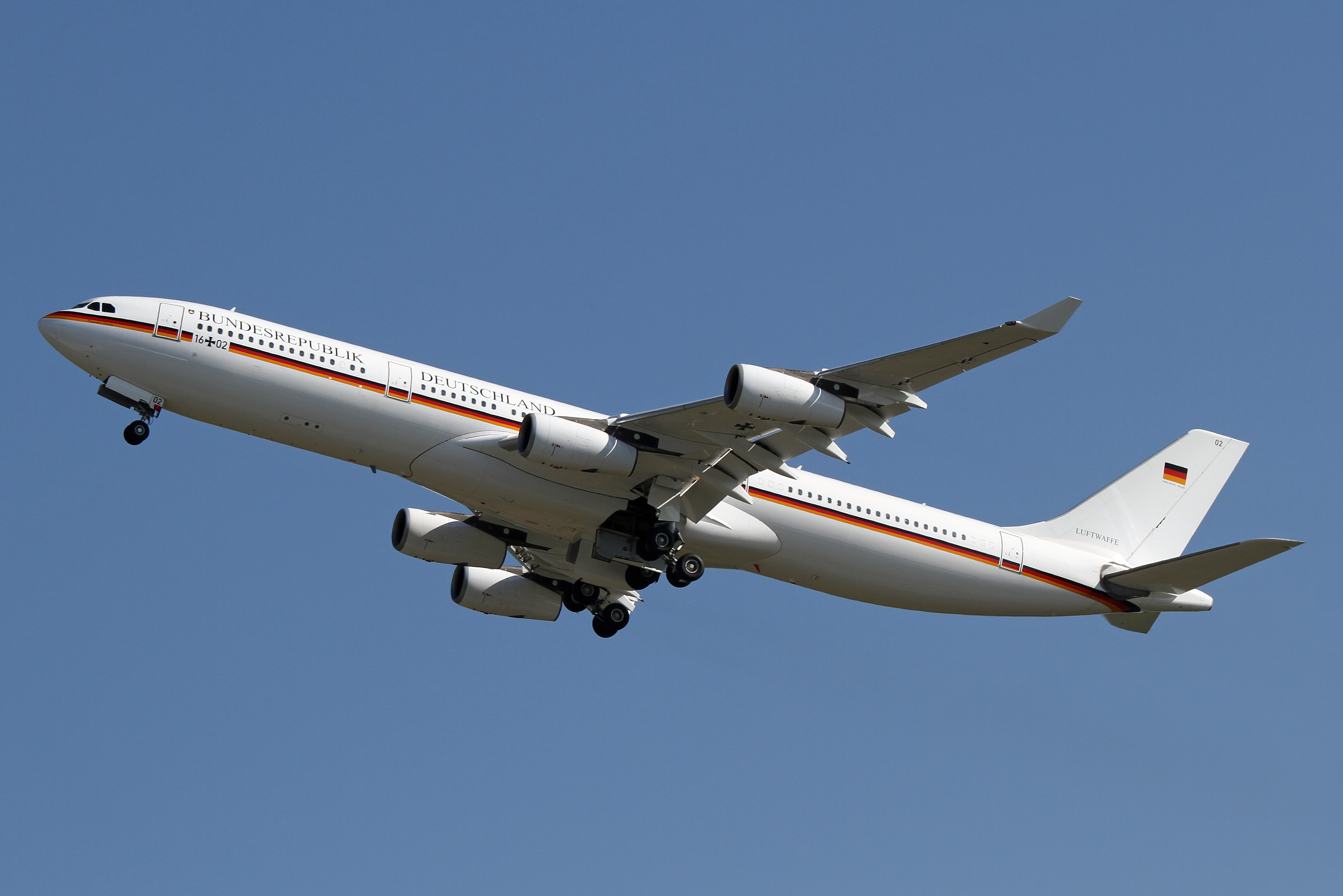
Bundeswehr Airbus A340-300

Based on Airbus' first four engine design, the ETOPS immune A340-300 Prestige offers a 7,700 nmi (14,300 km; 8,900 mi) range for 75 passengers. It is powered by four CFM56-5C4/P engines, each rated at 151 kN (34,000 lbf) thrust.

=== ACJ340-500 ===
The ACJ340-500 is a longer-range complement to the A340-300 Prestige with a 10,000 nmi (19,000 km; 12,000 mi) range as a result of having a higher fuel capacity and an updated wing with increased span and area. It carries 75 passengers and can link almost any imaginable city pair on the globe. It is powered by four Rolls-Royce Trent 556 engines, each rated at 249 kN (56,000 lbf).

=== ACJ340-600 ===
The ACJ340-600 is a version of the A340-600 with range increased to 8,500 nmi (15,700 km; 9,800 mi).

=== ACJ350 ===
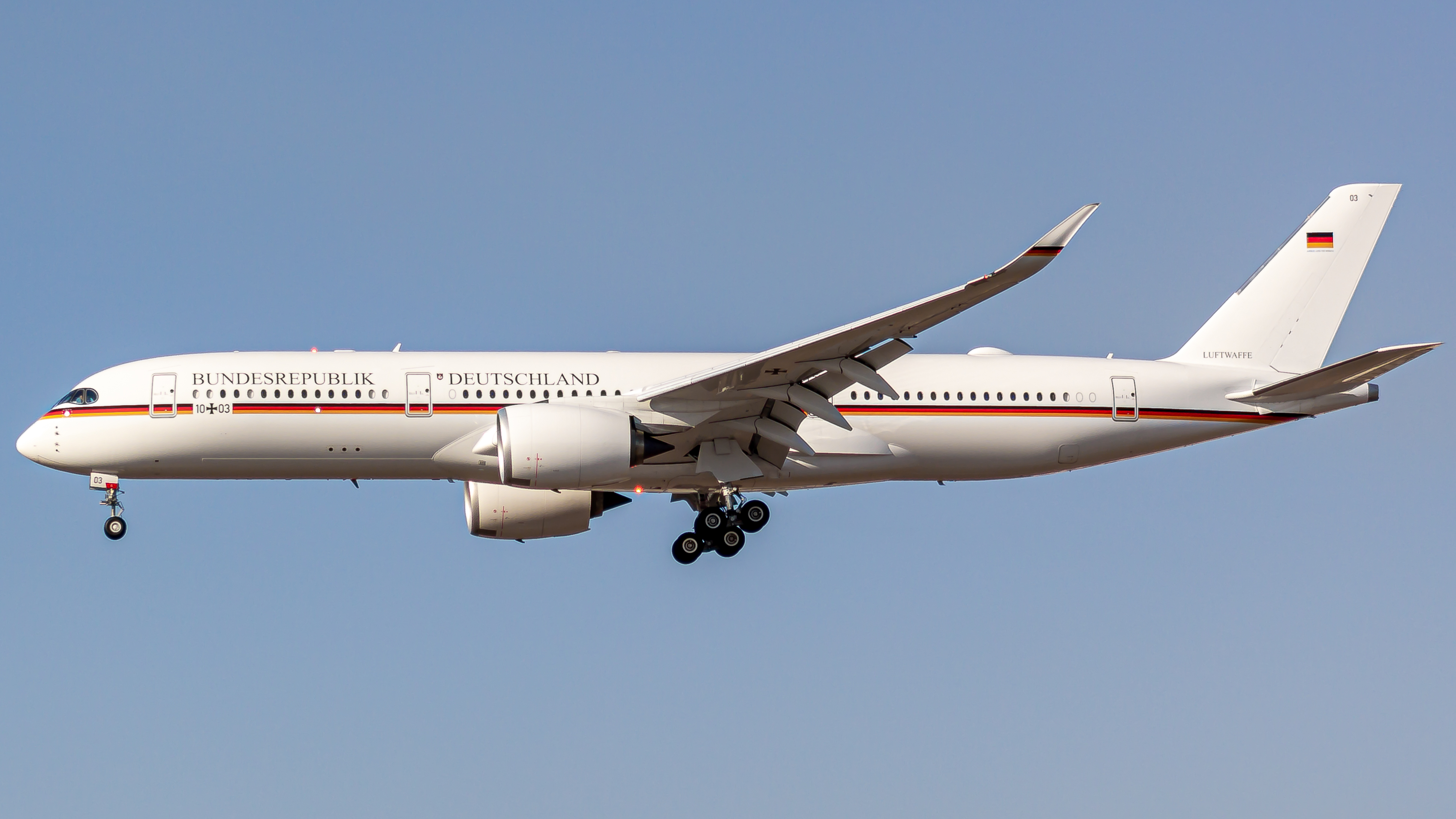
German Air Force Airbus A350-900

The A330 and A340 successor A350 XWB is also offered as the ACJ350 corporate jet by Airbus Corporate Jets, offering a 11,100 nmi (20,600 km; 12,800 mi) range for 25 passengers for the -900 derivative and 270 square metres (2,900 ft^{2}) of cabin space. This range is the distance between two antipodes, allowing connection with any suitable airport.

=== ACJ380 ===
One executive variant of the Airbus A380 was ordered in 2012, with two full decks and a third deck in the cargo compartment, but the aircraft was sold as a regular aircraft before modifications were made. Range was to be increased to 8,900 nmi (16,500 km; 10,200 mi). The undelivered plane, ordered by Prince Al-Waleed bin Talal, was to be called "Prestige". The Guardian reported the plane was sold amid disputes between Forbes and Talal relating to the size of his fortune and his efforts to affect his ranking on the Forbes billionaires list.

As of May 2018, plans to retrofit one of the first A380s to be retired from service with Singapore Airlines as a business jet were reported to be "at a very advanced stage". Refitting a retired A380 would cost less than buying a new A330 or Boeing 777 business jet.

=== Specifications ===
Variant	ACJ330-800	ACJ330-900	ACJ340	ACJ350	ACJ380
Typical VIP pax	25				50
Wingspan	64 m (210 ft)		63.45 m (208.2 ft)	64.75 m (212.4 ft)	79.75 m (261.6 ft)
Height	17.39 m (57.1 ft)	16.79 m (55.1 ft)	17.53 m (57.5 ft)	17.05 m (55.9 ft)	24.09 m (79.0 ft)
Length	58.82 m (193.0 ft)	63.66 m (208.9 ft)	67.93 m (222.9 ft)	66.8 m (219 ft)	72.72 m (238.6 ft)
Cabin Length	45 m (148 ft)	50.35 m (165.2 ft)	54.00 m (177.17 ft)	51.04 m (167.5 ft)	44.90, 43.93 m (147.3, 144.1 ft)
Cabin area	215.6 m^{2} (2,321 sq ft)	243 m^{2} (2,620 sq ft)	258.5 m^{2} (2,782 sq ft)	270 m^{2} (2,900 sq ft)	305, 249 m^{2} (3,280, 2,680 sq ft)
Fuselage Width	5.64 m (222 in)			5.96 m (235 in)	7.14 m (281 in)
Cabin width × height	5.27×2.41 m (207×95 in)			5.61×2.43 m (221×96 in)	6.54×2.33, 5.75×2.29 m 257×92, 226×90 in
MTOW	251 t (553,000 lb)		380 t (840,000 lb)	280 t (620,000 lb)	560 t (1,230,000 lb)
Max fuel	139.09 m^{3} (30,600 imp gal; 36,740 US gal)		215.26 m^{3} (47,350 imp gal; 56,870 US gal)	165 m^{3} (36,000 imp gal; 44,000 US gal)	324.56 m^{3} (71,390 imp gal; 85,740 US gal)
Unit thrust	320 kN (72,000 lb_{f})		235–249 kN (53,000–56,000 lb_{f})	374 kN (84,000 lb_{f})	311 kN (70,000 lb_{f})
Max speed	Mach 0.86 (493 kn; 568 mph; 914 km/h)			Mach 0.89 (511 kn; 587 mph; 945 km/h)	
Range	19,260 km (11,970 mi; 10,400 nmi)		18,300 km (11,400 mi; 9,900 nmi)	20,550 km (12,770 mi; 11,100 nmi)	17,500 km (10,900 mi; 9,400 nmi)
Takeoff	2,770 m (9,090 ft)		3,180 m (10,430 ft)	2,200 m (7,200 ft)	2,880 m (9,450 ft)
Landing	1,730 m (5,680 ft)		1,960 m (6,430 ft)	1,966 m (6,450 ft)	2,030 m (6,660 ft)
Service ceiling	12,500 m (41,000 ft)			13,100 m (43,000 ft)	

== Orders, deliveries, and operators ==
Governments, executive and private jets
Aircraft	A220 -100	A220 -300	A318	A319	A319 neo	A320	A320 neo	A321	A321 neo	A300	A310	A330 -200	A330 neo	A340 -2/300	A340 -5/600	A350 -900	A350 -1000	A380 -800	All
Ordered	6	2	20	77	6	20	8	1	2	3	3	69	0	7	7	5	0	1	238
Delivered	0	0	20	77	3	20	6	1	0	3	3	60	0	7	7	3	0	0	210
Operated	0	0	20	74	3	29	7	2	0	0	17	62	0	10	10	2	0	0	236

== See also ==
- Environmental impact of aviation – Effect of emissions from aircraft engines
