= Klik =

Klik may refer to:

- KLIK, an AM radio station broadcasting out of Jefferson City, Missouri
- Klik (candy), an Israeli candy brand marketed by Unilever
- KLIK Amsterdam Animation Festival, an animation festival organised annually in Amsterdam, the Netherlands
- Klik (Clickteam), a software produced by French company Clickteam
- Klik (packaging method), former name of the portable Linux software format AppImage
- KLIK or Klebelsberg Központ, Hungarian ministry of public education
- A brand name of canned processed pork by Canadian company, Maple Leaf Foods

== See also ==
- Click (disambiguation)
