= Chandrakala Mohan =

Indian Kannada actress

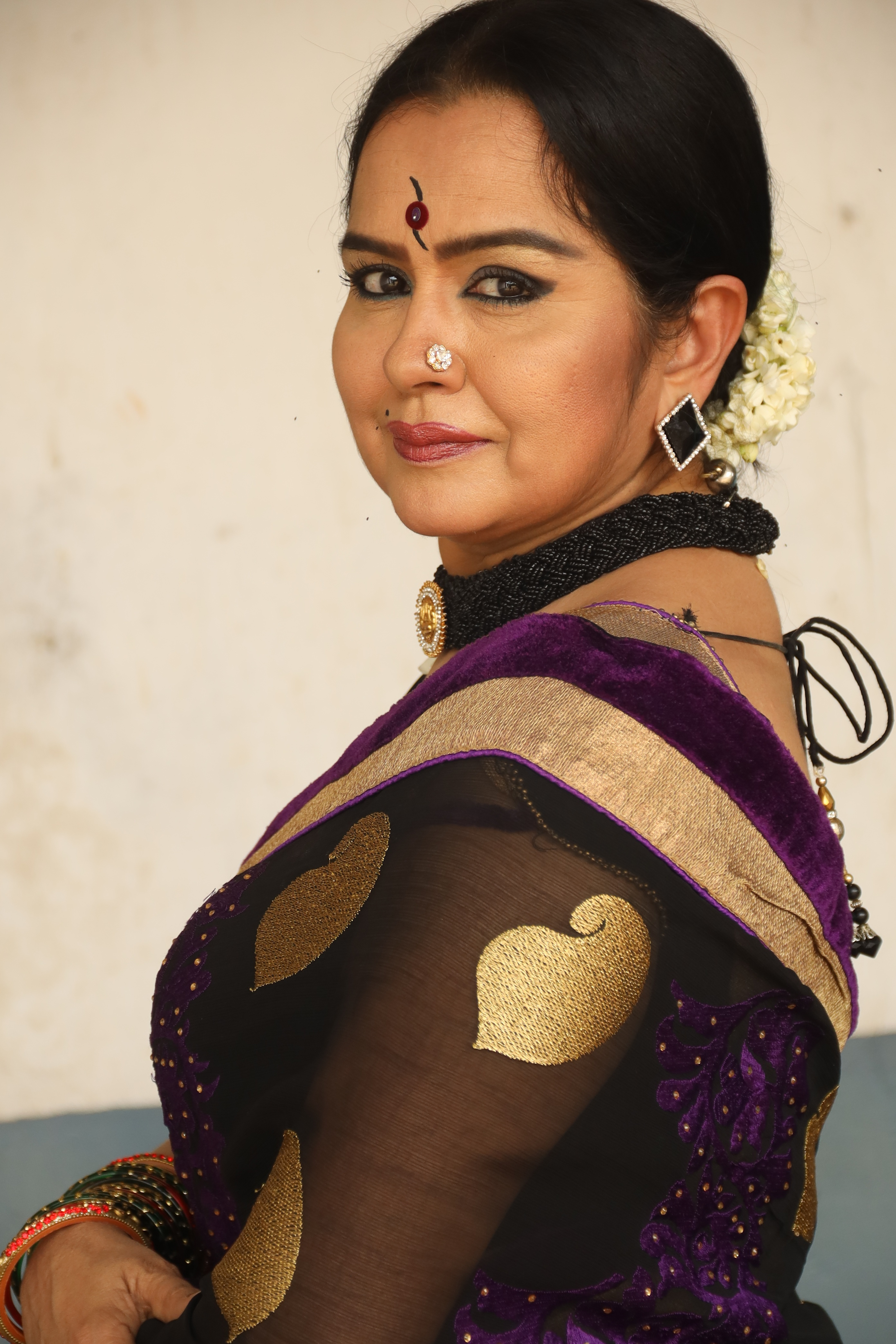
- Born: Chandrakala; Hosahalli, Mandya, Karnataka, India
- Occupation: Actress
- Children: 2
- Awards: Karnataka State Film Award for Best Supporting Actress

Chandrakala Mohan is an Indian theatre, serial and film actress, known for her works in Kannada. She received Karnataka State Film Award for Best Supporting Actress for her performance in the movie Runanubandha in 2009.

She acted in more than 50 Kannada serials. Dasapurandara in colors Kannada is her 50th serial.

== Career ==
Chandrakala started her career as a theatre actress at the age of 10 and entered television. Chandrakala Mohan has acted in over 50 Kannada series, With 'Dasapurandara' on colors kannnada channel marking her 50th. She had portrayed numerous successful characters across various leading television networks. Her portrayal of Ajjamma in the Kannada soap Puttagowri Maduve was noted.

Chandrakala was one of the contestants in the Bigg Boss Kannada (season 8) and got evicted on the 28th day of the show.

== Personal life ==
Chandrakala was born and brought up in Hosahalli in Mandya. She married Mohan at the age of 13 and has two children.

== Awards ==
Year	Award	Film	Category	Result
2009-10	Karnataka State Film Awards	Runanubandha	Best Supporting Actress	Won

== Selected filmography ==
Selected films are listed here.

Year	Title
2016	Bhujanga
2016	Pilibail Yumunakka - Tulu film
2014	Jai Lalitha
2012	Prem Adda
2011	Rajadhani
2006	Rambha
2024	Click
