= Clique (disambiguation) =

A clique is a close social group.

Clique or The Clique may also refer to:

== Math and computing ==
- Clique (graph theory)
  - Clique problem in computer science

== Entertainment and the arts ==
- Clique (TV series), an online serial on BBC Three
- The Clique (art group), a group of Victorian artists
  - St John's Wood Clique a later group of Victorian artists
- The Clique (series) by Lisi Harrison
  - The Clique (novel), a novel in the series
  - The Clique (film), based on the series
- Clique, a show on Canal+

=== Music groups ===
- The Clique (American band), a late 1960s U.S. sunshine pop band from Houston
- The Clique (British band), a 1990s mod band
- Skeleton Clique, or the Clique, the fan base of American musical duo Twenty One Pilots
- The Clique (duo), an Australian pop duo
- The Clique (trio), a group that performed on The X Factor in 2017
- Cliques, the piccolo and marching drum bands at the Carnival of Basel
- Destinee & Paris, a girl group formerly known as Clique Girlz
- HaClique, a 1980s Israeli rock band from Tel-Aviv
- The Wrecking Crew was sometimes referred to as "The Clique"
- The Cliques, a 1950s American R&B vocal duo of Jesse Belvin and Eugene Church

=== Songs ===
- "Clique", a 1974 single by Con Funk Shun
- "Clique" (Kanye West, Jay-Z and Big Sean song), 2012
- "Clique" (XO song), 2026
- "Clique/Fuckin' Problem", a 2012 song by Tyga from 187

== Other ==
- The Kliq, a famous 1990s group of professional wrestlers
- La Clique, a cabaret variety show originally staged at the Edinburgh Festival Fringe
- Château Clique, a group of wealthy families in Lower Canada in the early 19th century
- Ruling clique in politics (especially in the history of China)
  - Fujian clique, a group of Chinese politicians with close ties to Xi Jinping's time in Fujian
- Clique (vodka), a Latvian vodka sold in the United States

== See also ==
- Claque
- Click (disambiguation)
