= Chrome Air Service =

Nigerian airline

IATA	ICAO	Call sign
—	CHO	CHROME AIR
- Founded: 1990; Unknown founding location, possibly Lagos, Lagos State, Nigeria
- Ceased operations: April 30, 2007
- Fleet size: 2
- Headquarters: Lagos, Nigeria

Chrome Air Service was an airline based in Lagos, Nigeria. It was established sometime in the year of 1990 and operated a small charter service within Nigeria and other cities and countries in Western Africa. The company operated two BAC One-Eleven 500s since 1999, but the airline became defunct after April 30, 2007, after failing Nigerian airline safety standards. One aircraft has presumably been scrapped and the other, BAC One-Eleven 487GKF (Registration: 5N-SEO), remains in storage at Henri Coandă International Airport in Bucharest, Romania as of August 2017.

== History ==
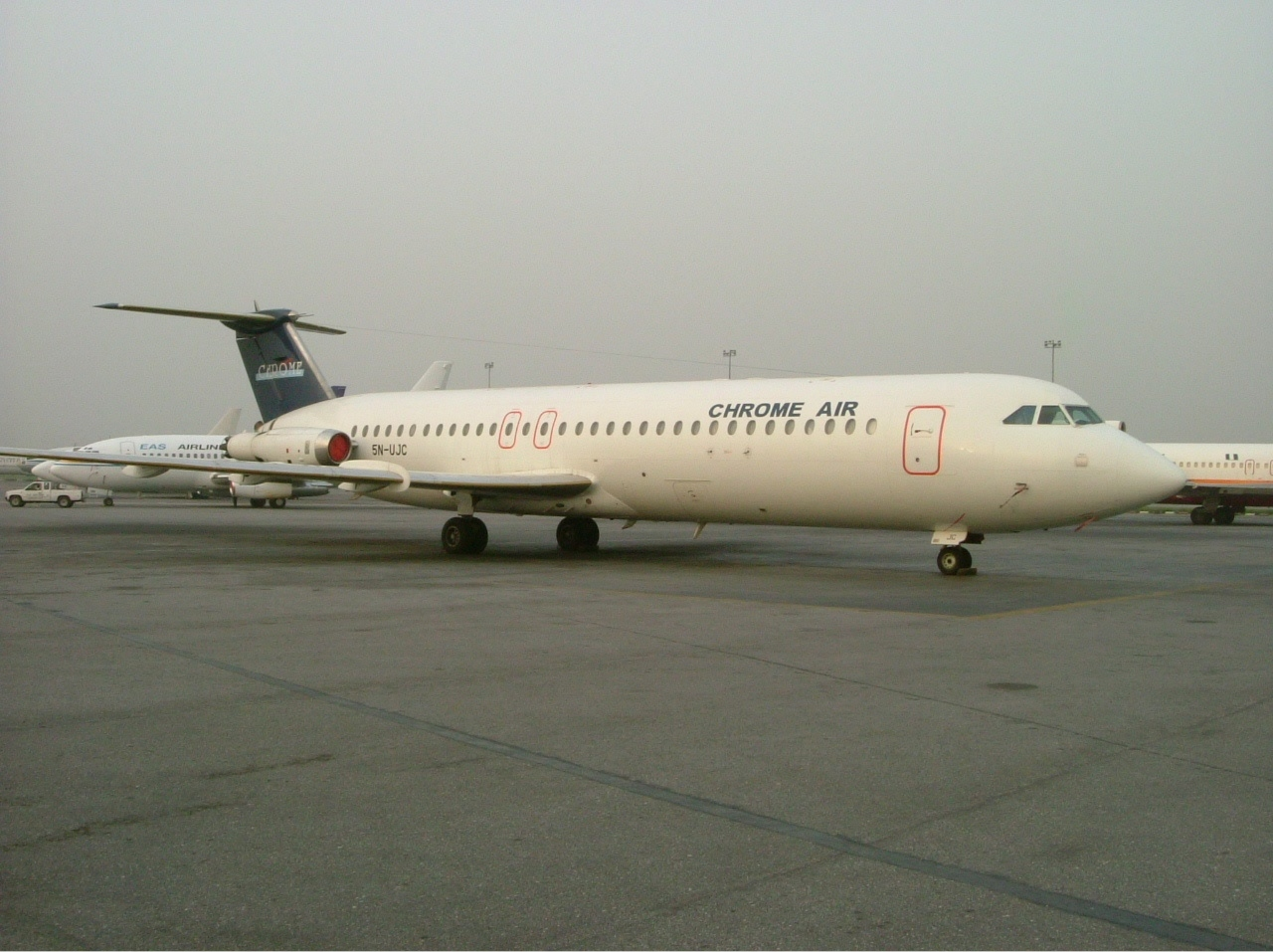
5N-UJC, a BAC One-Eleven 525FT on 8 February 2004

Chrome Air Service was founded in 1990. The origin city is unknown, although it is most likely Lagos, Nigeria. It is also presumed the airline commenced operations in 1999. That year, Chrome Air Service got two used BAC One-Eleven 500s, previously leased by several other airlines. However, in 2007, the Nigerian government set a deadline of April 30, 2007 for all airlines operating in the country to re-capitalise or be grounded, in an effort to "ensuring better services and safety" for Nigerian airlines. Chrome Air Services, along with six other airlines, failed to meet the deadline and as a result were not allowed fly in Nigeria's airspace beginning on April 30, 2007. The affected airlines would only fly if they satisfied the Nigerian Civil Aviation Authority (NCAA)'s criteria in terms of re-capitalization and thus be re-registered for operation. As of October 2016, Chrome Air Service has yet to meet the criteria, and likely went defunct in 2007. The status of the airline's fleet is unknown as of October 2016, although both aircraft are presumed to have been scrapped. One of the aircraft (5N-UJC) has been transported to an aircraft boneyard, while the other (5N-SEO) was transported to Henri Coandă International Airport in Bucharest, Romania.

== Fleet ==
The Chrome Air Service fleet consisted of the following:

Chrome Air Service fleet
Aircraft	Number of aircraft	Registration	Status	Notes
BAC One-Eleven 525FT	1	5N-UJC	Unknown, most likely scrapped and broken down	Aircraft has been leased with several other companies, including TAROM, Lauda Air, Istanbul Airlines, and Ryanair.
BAC One-Eleven 487GKF	1	5N-SEO	Stored at Henri Coandă International Airport outside near the taxiway in January 2013.	Aircraft has been in use with TAROM and Anglo Cargo previously before being leased to Chrome Air Services.
