= Cph Deutschland =

cph Deutschland
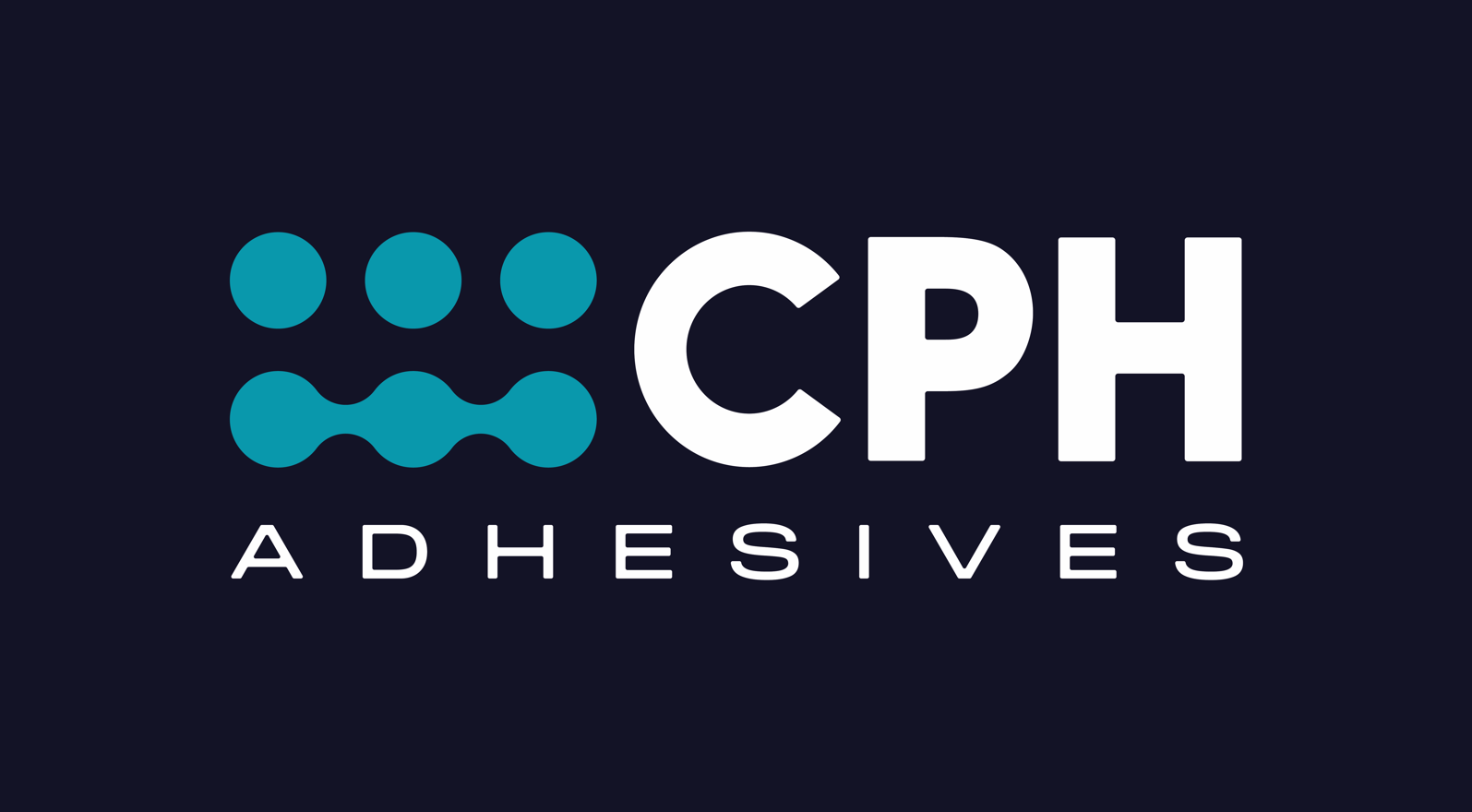
- Type: Limited liability company (Gesellschaft mit beschränkter Haftung)
- Industry: Chemical industry
- Founded: 1975
- Headquarters: Essen, Germany
- Key people: Gerwin Schüttpelz, Geschäftsführer, Gesellschafter
- Revenue: 100 Mio. EUR (2011)
- Number of employees: 270
- Website: www.cph-group.com

cph Deutschland Chemie- Produktions- und Handelsgesellschaft mbH is an internationally active family business based in Essen. It is one of the large-scale world-wide suppliers of biologically degradable industrial adhesives. The core competence of the undertaking lies in the production of environmentally friendly label adhesives for the foodstuffs-, packaging-, paper-processing- and cigarette industries. In the field of label adhesives, the cph group occupies the second place world-wide after Henkel. Apart from Germany it has production plants in Russia, Ukraine, Portugal and Germany. Further production plants are planned for Vietnam and Brazil. With its so-called Country Desks cph is represented in 70 countries and exports to 80. More than 90% of its German production is exported. The company was the first in Germany to be validated in accordance with the EC-Eco Audit (EMAS 1836/93). In the meantime cph has switched to the world-wide recognised DIN EN ISO 14001: 1996. In 2011, the cph group was awarded a certificate by the Efficiency Agency NRW in the context of the EcoProfit-project.

== History ==
In 1975, Gerwin Schüttpelz founded the cph Chemie Produktions- und Handelsgesellschaft as a dealer in industrial adhesives. In 1977, the production of starch- and cellulose adhesives commenced and in 1990, these were followed by the first protein-based label adhesive. Coca-Cola Deutschland, which was then based in Essen asked cph in 1990, to develop a special label adhesive for PET bottles. At this time the name of the company was changed to cph Deutschland GmbH. Then a production unit was set up in Ukraine followed by the establishment of cph Industries Moscow. Participation in cph Quimica in Portugal in 2002, came next and in 2009, a subsidiary company was established in the Netherlands.

== Products ==
- Label adhesives for all applications, e.g. glass- or plastic bottles in the beverage industry together with all other conceivable forms of label use. For example, preserves/ jams and honey in the foodstuffs industry, on metal containers used in the chemical industry for paints and varnishes and all types of plastic containers used for household cleaning agents. Special adhesives are available for coping with the challenge from condensation water or ice-water. The label adhesives are based on acrylates, dextrin, starch, hybrid mixtures and casein (fully bio-degradable).
- All the types of adhesive which are required for the cigarette industry, for both manufacture and packaging and encompassing all production speed ranges.
- Hot-Melts (adhesives liquefied by heat) for numerous applications such as, for example, diapers, female hygiene products, labels, etc.
- Hot-Melt Cleaners

== Awarded Distinctions ==
The cph group was nominated several times for the Grand Prix Medium-sized Business Award conferred by the Oscar-Patzelt-Stiftung. They were one of the finalists in 2007, and were distinguished as the prize-winner. In 1989, 1992, 1997, and 1999, they were awarded the “Distinction for environmentally-aware company managements” conferred by the Association of Independent Entrepreneurs.
