= The Clique (British band) =

English rock band

The Clique was an English rock band, formed in the late 1980s by Jon Paul Harper, Paul Newman, Phillip Otto and Gilles B. Mery. This line-up played many gigs centred on the revived UK mod scene. After sporadic experiments with keyboard players, including James Taylor (see below), Dom Strickland became full-time Hammond player in late 1991, and also their main songwriter, and Trevor French became lead singer. Up to that point the Clique had been a covers band, making up for their lack of original material by covering rare and obscure freakbeat material. Shortly thereafter, in an unrelated move, Mery departed to his native France, and he was replaced by Matthew Braim, who played his first gig in April 1993. This particular line-up is now generally regarded as the Clique at the height of their powers.

Their first recording, "Worming", appeared in a Totally Wired compilation album on the Acid Jazz Records label in 1989. Their raw R'n'B style showed up on the EP Detour Records edited in 1993, with the inclusion of "Early Days", featuring Taylor on Hammond organ.

In 1995 The Clique released The Self Preservation Society, with Bruce Brand on guitar, which became the number one best-selling album for the Detour Records label. The album sold over 5,000 copies at last count and at one point led the band to showcase for Björk's label "One Little Indian". Mark Lamarr, DJ for BBC Radio, made Self Preservation Society his Album of the Week and featured them on "Live in Session" on Radio One whilst doing a stand-in stint for Mark Radcliffe's evening show.

The band continued to play, and record, with different line-ups through the 1990s, associating Chris Jordan, Alex Petty, Bruce Brand (from Thee Headcoats), Dom Strickland, and in 1998 with their final EP, Hello Sunshine.

Their discography is made of at least six singles or EPs, and two albums.

== Discography ==
=== Singles ===
- "Introducing The Clique" EP (Guild Records, 1991)
- "Early Days" EP (Detour Records, 1993)
- "Reggie" / "She Doesn't Need You Any More" (Detour Records, 1994)
- "Bareback Donkey Riding" (Detour Records, 1994)
- "Save Me" / "The Fish Down Gina's" (Detour Records, 1996)
- "Hello Sunshine" / "After Five" / "Hanging Around" (Detour Records, 1998)

=== Albums ===
- Shout & Scream The Clique / Thee Cherylinas / The Apemen (Detour Records, 1994)
- Self Preservation Society (Detour Records, 1995)
- Vanburg Park (Detour Records, 2003)
- Clique Preservation Society Vinyl Box set (Detour Records, 2024)

== Line-ups ==
- Vocals: Paul Newman / Chris Jordan / Trevor French / Peter Wild / Alex Petty
- Guitar: Jon-Paul Harper / Bruce Brand
- Bass: Phillip Otto
- Hammond organ: James Taylor / Dom Strickland
- Drums: Gilles B. Mery / Matthew Braim
