= Civair =

South African airline

IATA	ICAO	Call sign
2I	CIW	CIVFLIGHT
- Founded: 1989; 37 years ago
- Hubs: Cape Town International Airport
- Focus cities: Cape Town
- Fleet size: 12
- Headquarters: Cape Town, South Africa
- Key people: Andy Cluver
- Website: civair.co.za

Civair is an aircraft charter operator based in Cape Town, South Africa. The company's core business is the operation of helicopter charters.

== History ==
Civair has operated helicopter and fixed-wing business charter services since 1989. Civair Helicopters CC operates the helicopter and fixed wing charter services, the main business of the organisation.

In March 2004, an attempt was made at starting up a low-cost airline flying between Cape Town and London Stansted, planning to serve the route three times a week with a Boeing 747-200. The now defunct Civair Airways (Pty) Ltd was due to operate the web-based international budget airline.

== Controversy ==
In December 2004, about 7,400 passengers were left out-of-pocket when it transpired that Civair did not have an aircraft available for the flights, nor did it have the funding to offer any alternatives. No authority had been received from United Kingdom transport officials for landing in the UK either.

Amidst the public relations disaster that followed, partial refunds were given to passengers who purchased tickets on their website, civair.com, their only ticket outlet. None of the passengers were ever officially notified of the cancellations. Civair received a further blow when it was discovered that the Proudly South African logo (a South African business standards association) was being illegally used, as Civair was not a member.

Early in 2005, the company's Director, Andy Cluver, together with Kobus Nell, the organization's accountant, were called to account for Civair's actions by the CAA (Civil Aviation Authority) in South Africa.
