= Click (2024 film) =

2024 Indian Kannada-language film

- Directed by: Shashikumar
- Written by: Shashikumar
- Produced by: Shashikiransuhas
- Starring: Pavan Basur; Chandrakala Mohan; Silli Lalli Anand
- Cinematography: Jeevan Gowda
- Edited by: Vinaykumar Coorg
- Music by: Vishwas Koushik
- Release date: 2 February 2024
- Country: India
- Language: Kannada

Click is a 2024 Indian Kannada-language comedy drama film written and directed by Shashikumar, co-directed by Veeru and produced by Shashikiransuhas under Sharanya Films. The film stars Pavan Basrur in lead role.

Click was released on 2 February 2024.

== Plot ==
In the film, Samarth, disinterested in education, leaves home due to stress and loneliness. He meets Siddarth, an IT professional and photographer, who offers him shelter. Samarth learns about the importance of education and parental support while staying with Siddarth's family. When his own family learns about his passion for photography, they realize the importance of supporting children in pursuing their dreams. Samarth eventually finds success in photography with the support of his family.

== Cast ==
- Pavan Basrur as Samarth
- Karthik Kadamba as Siddhart
- Silli lalli Anand as Sanket
- Shashisumana as Swapna
- Chandrakala Mohan as Siddarth's Mother
- Rachana Dasharath as Inchara
- Sanju basayya as Sanju

== Release and reception ==
Click was released on 2 February 2024 in India.

A Sharadhaa of Cinema Express gave 3/5 stars and wrote "Click may not follow the usual storytelling norms but it weaves a compelling narrative through a relatable story and themes that are very relevant to our times. The film offers valuable insights into the delicate relationships between parents and children and how even good intentions might become restrictive."

Times Now gave 3/5 stars and wrote "Click is a poignant cinematic journey that delves into the less-explored realms of children's emotional struggles. Shashi Kumar Mandya's sensitive direction, coupled with heartfelt performances and visually appealing storytelling, makes this film a compelling watch. As it brings attention to the often overlooked subject of parental mistreatment, Click prompts contemplation on the importance of understanding and addressing children's emotional needs."

== Soundtrack ==
The soundtracks of the film were composed by Vishwas Koushik and Background Score is done by Akash Parwa. Music Supervising and mix-mashing is done by Ravi Basrur.

No.	Title	Lyrics	Singer(s)	Length
1.	"Shuruvada Daarige"	Kinnal Raj; Siri	Rajesh Krishnan	3:18
2.	"Payana Ellige"	Kinnal Raj	Vasuki Vaibhav	4:36
