= Click (Canadian TV program) =

Canadian television program

- Genre: Instructional
- Presented by: Ken Haslam; Frank Herbert
- Country of origin: Canada
- Original language: English
- No. of seasons: 1

Production
- Producer: Doug Stephen
- Production location: Toronto
- Running time: 15 minutes

Original release
- Network: CBC Television
- Release: 5 July – 27 September 1962

Click is a Canadian instructional television program that aired on CBC Television in 1962.

== Premise ==
This Toronto-produced program featured information on various aspects of amateur photography and filmmaking with demonstrations of the various materials, methods and devices used. Occasional location segments were recorded at laboratories in specialties such as science and forensics.

== Scheduling ==
This 15-minute program was broadcast on Thursdays at 6:30 p.m. (North American Eastern time) from 5 July to 27 September 1962.
