= Comlux =

Charter airline based in Zürich, Switzerland

IATA	ICAO	Call sign
—	CLA	COMLUX
- Founded: 2003; 23 years ago
- Hubs: Zurich Airport
- Fleet size: 22
- Headquarters: Zürich, Switzerland
- Key people: Richard Gaona; Joseph Huber; Arnaud Martin
- Employees: 300–500
- Website: comlux.com

Comlux Aviation AG is a charter airline headquartered in Zürich, Switzerland. It provides services in the fields of aircraft operations, charter management, aircraft sales, and upgrades.

== Services ==
=== Comlux Aviation ===
Comlux Aviation provides aircraft operations and management services to VIP customers. It has five Airbus ACJ Family aircraft in the fleet. Comlux Aviation also operates fleets of Bombardier business aircraft, and since September 2011, it has operated a VIP Boeing 767BBJ available for charter.

Comlux operates commercially under four AOCs: 9H Malta, P4 Aruba, UP Kazakhstan, and T7 San Marino. Comlux Aviation's commercial offices are located in Zürich, Moscow, Almaty, and Hong Kong. OneAbove by Comlux provides VIP charters with the Comlux Aviation fleet. It has operational bases at Malta International Airport, Almaty Airport, and Vnukovo International Airport.

=== Comlux Completion ===
Comlux Completion, located in Indianapolis, Indiana, is a completion center dedicated to VIP aircraft cabins. During the summer of 2012, Comlux Completion opened its new hangar facility at Indianapolis International Airport.

=== Comlux Transaction ===
The Comlux Transaction team is based in Zürich and is in charge of purchasing, selling, and leasing VIP aircraft.

== Fleet ==
As of September 2022, Comlux operates a fleet of several corporate and VIP configured aircraft of the following types:

- 1 Airbus A318CJ
- 2 Airbus A319CJ
- 1 Boeing 737-500
- 1 Boeing 767-200ER
- 1 Boeing 787-8
- 1 Bombardier Challenger 850
- 1 Bombardier Challenger 604
- 1 Embraer Legacy 650
- 1 Embraer Preator 600
- 1 Pilatus PC-24

=== Fleet development ===
In early 2015, it was announced that Comlux had ordered two Boeing 737 MAX 8 Business Jets. In February 2016, Comlux announced a new order for 3 ACJ320neo powered by CFM International Leap-1A engines.

== Comlux Aruba ==
Comlux Aruba
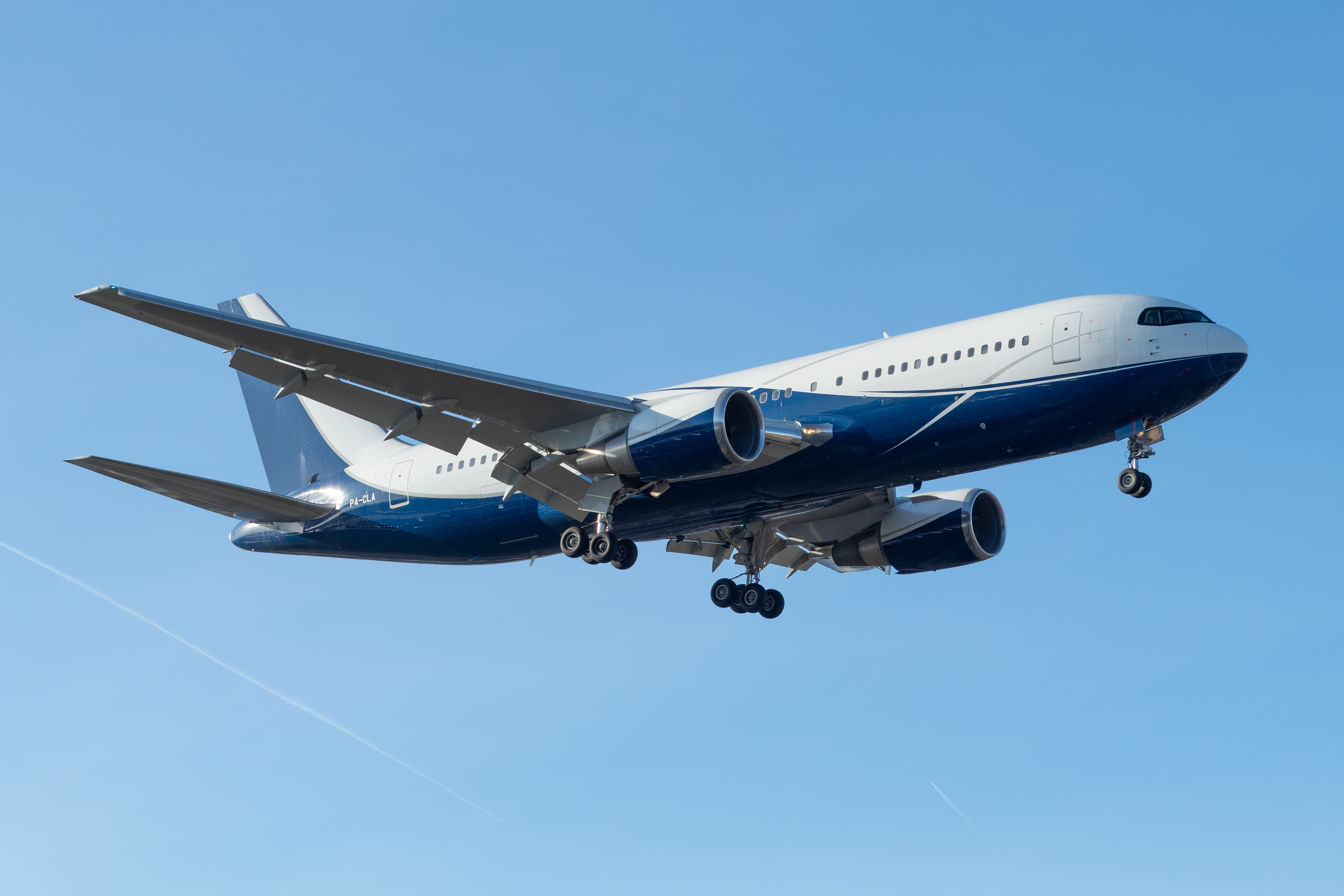
IATA	ICAO	Call sign
CS	CXB	STARLUX
- Founded: 2003 to 2011
- Commenced operations: September 26, 2011
- Hubs: Queen Beatrix International Airport
- Fleet size: 2
- Parent company: Comlux (100%)
- Headquarters: Oranjestad, Aruba

== Comlux Kazakhstan ==
Comlux Kazakhstan
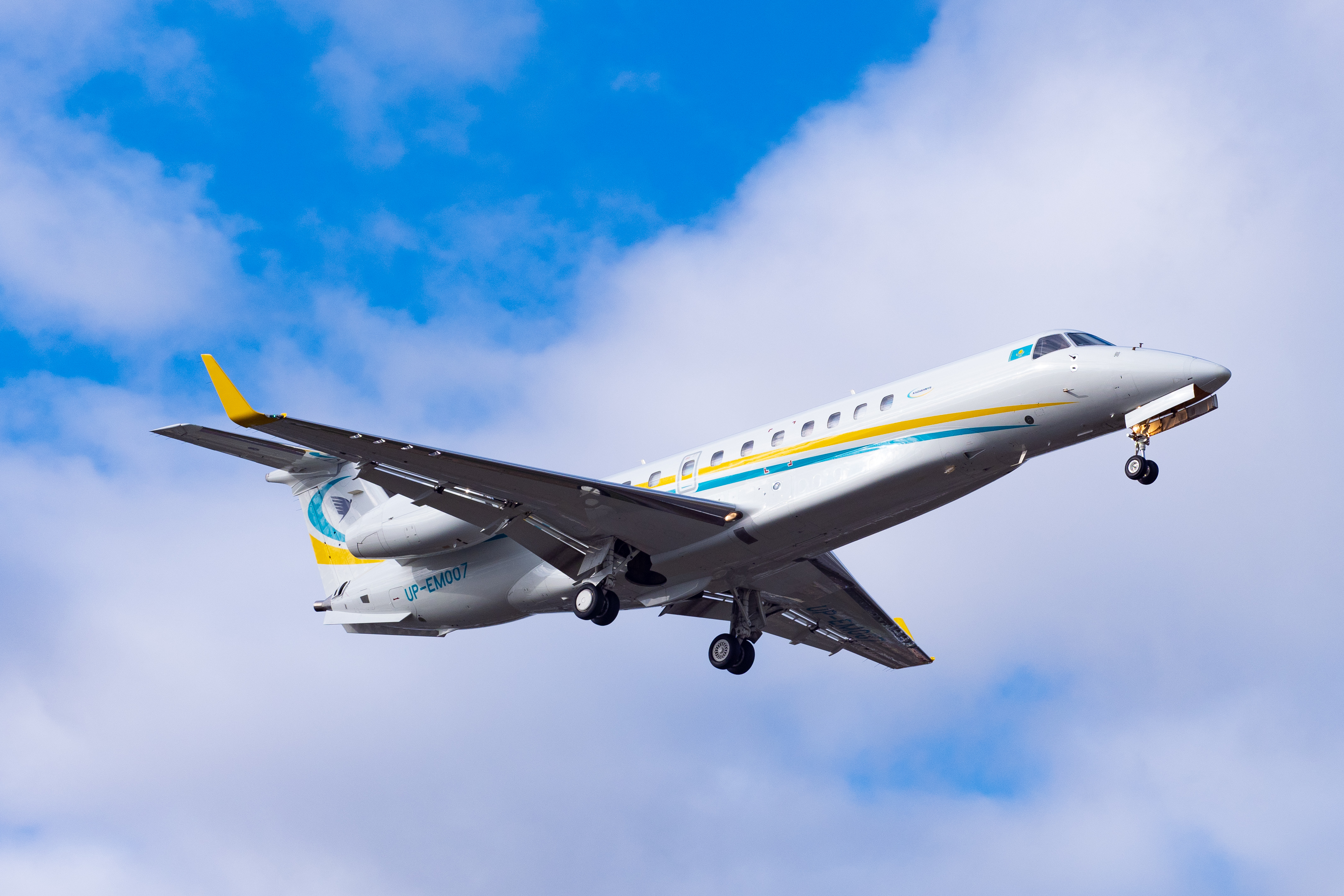
IATA	ICAO	Call sign
—	KAZ	KAZLUX
- Commenced operations: August 2008
- Hubs: Almaty International Airport
- Fleet size: 4
- Parent company: Comlux (100%)
- Headquarters: Almaty, Kazakhstan

Comlux Kazakhstan (Comlux KZ) is a fully owned subsidiary of Comlux and operates charter and business flights out of its base of Almaty.

== Comlux Aviation Malta ==
Comlux Aviation Malta
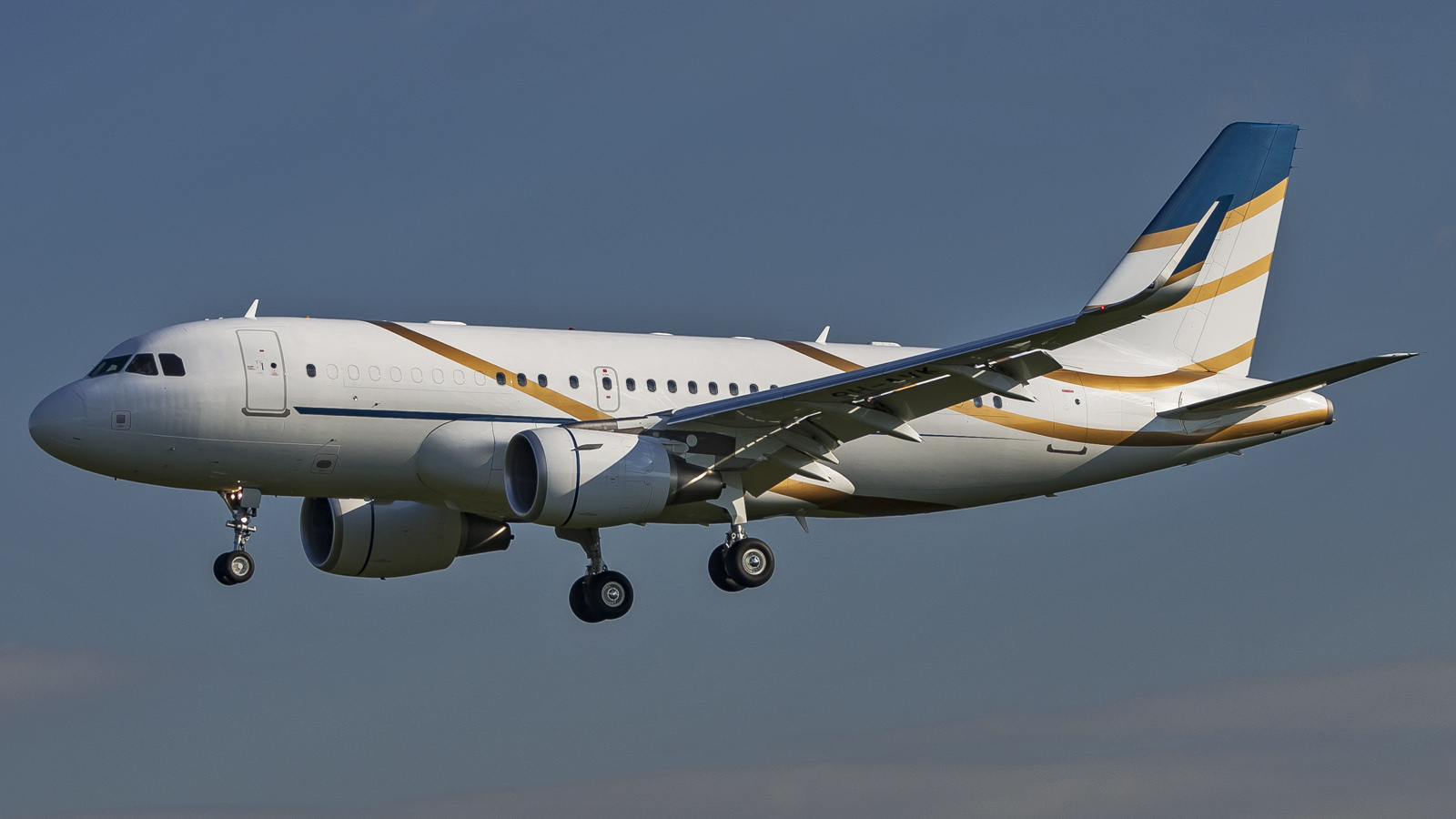
IATA	ICAO	Call sign
CS	MLM	LUXMALTA
- Commenced operations: September 2008
- Hubs: Malta International Airport
- Fleet size: 6
- Parent company: Comlux (100%)
- Headquarters: Malta

=== Current fleet ===
As of July 2026, the Comlux Aviation Malta fleet includes the following aircraft:

Aircraft	In service	Orders	Notes
Boeing 737-500	1	—	
Total	1	—	
