= Click Asia Summit =

Technological Conference in India

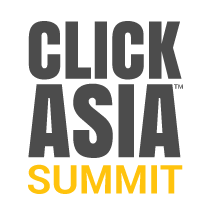
- Status: Active
- Genre: Digital Marketing Conference
- Venue: Taj Lands End
- Location: Mumbai
- Country: India
- Inaugurated: 2011
- Most recent: 2016
- Organizer: Click Media Pvt. Ltd.
- Website: www.clickasiasummit.com

Click Asia Summit is a conference, expo, and workshop focused on digital and mobile marketing, held in India. The event includes speakers, workshops, and networking sessions, to learn about trends and technologies in the industry. The event is primarily focused on Asian companies.

== 2016 ==
The "Click Asia Summit" 2016 was held at Taj Lands End, Mumbai on the 21-22 April. Robert Scoble, Entrepreneur in Residence from UploadVR, was the Keynote Speaker of Click Asia Summit 2016.

== 2012 ==
The "Click Asia Summit" 2012 was held on 15-17 January at the Taj Lands End, Mumbai. The speaker lineup included Shashi Tharoor and Ankit Fadia.

Workshops held included courses on SEO, Social Media, Analytics and Creativity.

== 2011 ==
The first "Click Asia Summit" was held on 20-22 January 2011 at the Taj Lands End, Mumbai. The keynote speakers were Gurbaksh Chahal and Gillian Muessig. The evening guest speaker was actor Anupam Kher.

== Attendees ==
Click Asia Summit is aimed at: large businesses, SEO companies, IT companies, small and medium businesses, and digital agencies.
