= Danny Click =

American singer-songwriter

- Danny Click onstage at Rancho Nicasio, Marin County, California, November 2012

Background information
- Born: December 5, 1960 (age 64); Tipton, Indiana, United States
- Genres: Blues, alternative country, country rock
- Occupation(s): Singer-songwriter, guitarist
- Instruments: Guitar, slide guitar
- Years active: 1989–present
- Labels: Dogstar Records
- Website: www.dannyclick.com

Danny Click (born December 5, 1960) is an American singer-songwriter and blues guitarist born in Tipton, Indiana. After moving to Austin, Texas, Click played with a number of local aggregations, including a stint as guitarist in Jimmy LaFave's touring band. He has recorded seven albums. Since moving to California in 2006, he leads Danny Click & the Hell Yeahs!

== Early life ==
Danny Click was born and raised in a working-class family outside Indianapolis, Indiana, the youngest of nine children. He began playing guitar at age 6, and played in his older sister's band when he was in high school. Click also learned some mandolin and lap steel.

When he was 10, his father and one of his brothers died, a tragedy that inspired "Ten Years," one of several autobiographical songs on the album Life Is A Good Place.

== Career ==
=== Influences ===
Discussing his early influences, he says "I still remember the exact moment I heard "Sultans of Swing" for the first time. Changed my musical life. And I remember listening to Abraxas and putting up black-light posters! So many great bands that helped me think differently," he said.

Click credits such musicians and bands as Buck Owens, Merle Haggard, Duane Allman, David Lindley, Ry Cooder, Santana, Mark Knopfler and Dire Straits for inspiring him musically. Additional influences include The Beatles, Tom Petty, Eric Clapton, Albert King, Freddie King, Jeff Beck fellow Hoosier John Mellencamp and fellow Austinite Stevie Ray Vaughan.

=== Recording and performing ===
After arriving in Austin, Texas in 1989, he formed the band Danny and the Hurricanes, released his first album, and also began touring with folksinger Jimmy LaFave.

His career was put on hold for two years after he was rear-ended by an 18- wheeler in his Honda Civic in 1995. After going through two years of therapy, he was able to return to the stage in 1998.

Click moved to Marin County, California, in 2006. He formed Danny Click & the Hell Yeahs! in 2011. It included Marin County musician Bonnie Hayes (keyboards, backing vocals), until her departure in August 2013 to take the position of chair of the songwriting department at the Berklee College of Music. The rest of the band comprises Kevin Hayes (drums), Don Bassey (bass, backing vocals), Adrienne Biggs (violin), Lynn Asher (backing vocals), and Jon Mitguard (pedal steel). The band's lineup is not entirely static. Other members have included Steve Abramson (keyboards), Tracy Blackman (guitar, backing vocals), Ernest Carter (drummer), Mike Emerson (keyboards), Jennifer Jane (vocals), and Paul Revelli (drums), as well as frequent guest musicians. Danny Click & the Hell Yeahs! took up various residencies around Fairfax, California, though for several years based in San Rafael.

Click's CD Life Is A Good Place remained on Country, Pop and Americana radio charts for over 12 consecutive months, with the first single, "Wait My Turn" reaching No. 1 on the Indie World Country chart in Nashville, and the second single, "I Feel Good Today" reaching No. 14 on the NMW national mainstream Country radio chart.

Click released a two-song "single" on April 19, 2013, entitled "Baptize Me Over Elvis Presley's Grave," backed with an acoustic version of "Blue Skies."

Click released Captured Live! in March 2014, recorded September 6, 2013 at 142 Throckmorton in Mill Valley, California. The album was engineered by Matt Cohen, and was initially financed by a Kickstarter campaign.

== Discography ==
- Forty Miles (1999 – DogStar Records)
- Night of the Living Guitars (2001 – Appaloosa/I.R.D 2000)
- Elvis the Dog (2003 – DogStar Records)
- Life Is a Good Place (2011 – DogStar Records)
- Baptize Me Over Elvis Presley's Grave Single. (2013 – DogStar Records)
- Captured Live! (2014 – DogStar Records)
- Holding Up The Sun (2015 – DogStar Records)
- Danny Click and the Americana Orchestra: Live at 142 (2018 – DogStar Records)
