= CitationAir =

| IATA | ICAO | Call sign |
|---|---|---|
| — | FIV | FIVE STAR |
- Founded: 31 December 1998; 27 years ago
- Ceased operations: 31 October 2014; 12 years ago
- Operating bases: Westchester County Airport
- Fleet size: 114

CitationAir by Cessna, founded in 2000 as CitationShares, was a subsidiary of Cessna Aircraft Company that provided private aviation services. It offered services in fractional jet ownership, jet card membership, corporate solutions and whole aircraft management. CitationAir was one of the four major players in the private aviation market during its time in operation. It was a seven-time winner of Best of the Best awards from the Robb Report, most recently in 2009.

== History ==
In 2009, the company rebranded itself as CitationAir, changed its business model, and streamlined the product names it offered.

In 2012 the company announced that it would stop selling fractional shares. In August 2014 the company announced that it would cease all flight operations on 31 October 2014 and would close down. Following the shutdown, its FAR Part 135 Operating Certificate was surrendered to the Federal Aviation Administration on 6 November 2014.

CitationAir was known for pioneering an efficient flight schedule based on in-house-developed software and it was responsible for introducing many non-owners to the Citations.

== Services ==
CitationAir offered four different programs for its customers Citation Air Jet Shares, formerly Citelines, referred to the fractional jet ownership program that CitationAir offered. This program incorporated all operating expenses into one annual or twelve monthly payments, regardless of where one flew. This program differentiated between peak and non-peak days, allowing share owners to pick one of four packages: 365 days, 350 days, 335 days or 320 days a year.

Another CitationAir program was the CitationAir Jet Card, formerly the Vector Fleet JetCard. The CitationAir Jet Card gave members access to two different options. The Jet Card option allowed customers to purchase prepaid flight hours in a specific aircraft. The Fleet Jet Card allowed customers to purchase prepaid flight hours which gave them access to the entire CitationAir fleet. With the Jet Card, customers purchased prepaid flight hours instead of shares.

With CitationAir's Jet Access, customers could get the benefits of fractional ownership, without actually purchasing a share.

The CitationAir Corporate Solutions program contained CitationAir's Supplemental Lift which supported corporate flight departments with private aviation needs. Corporations had access to CitationAir's entire Cessna Citation fleet without the financial commitment that is associated with owning and maintaining a whole aircraft, reducing the corporation's capital expenditures and operating costs.

CitationAir Jet Management, formerly JetForth, was designed for people who own planes but did not want the hassle of managing them. Under this program, CitationAir would use a Jet Management customer's aircraft in order to support and backup the CitationAir fleet, making the aircraft available to fractional and jet card members when not in use by owner. This generated revenue for Jet Management customers, which offset the cost of ownership.

On February 6, 2012, CitationAir's president and chief operating officer, William Schultz, announced that though the company intended to honor existing Jet Share and Jet Access contracts until their expirations, the firm had ceased writing new Jet Share and Jet Access contracts. In an announcement electronically delivered to the firm's employees, Mr. Schultz said the company would direct its focus toward the Jet Card, Charter and Jet Management lines of business.

== Fleet ==
At its peak, CitationAir had a fleet of approximately 100 Cessna Citation Jets. The fleet consisted of 5 different types of Citations:

- Cessna Citation Bravo (retired from the fleet prior to ceasing operations)
- Cessna Citation CJ3
- Cessna Citation Excel
- Cessna Citation Sovereign
- Cessna Citation X (added to the fleet in December 2009)

== Awards ==
CitationAir won Best of the Best awards from the Robb Report from 2003 to 2009. In 2009, it won awards for fractional programs and fractional card programs. It was named the sole Best of the Best in flight services in 2008. It was one of four winners of Best of the Best in fractional flight card programs in 2007.

In 2009, Bill Hall, CitationShares' CIO, won a CIO100 Award from CIO Magazine for creating new business value by innovating with technology.

== See also ==
- List of defunct airlines of the United States
