= Cat Aviation =

Swiss airline

| IATA | ICAO | Call sign |
|---|---|---|
| — | CAZ | EUROCAT |
- Founded: 1987; 39 years ago
- Hubs: Zurich Airport
- Fleet size: 5
- Headquarters: Kloten, Switzerland
- Key people: Helene Niedhart (CEO)
- Website: http://www.cat-aviation.com

Cat Aviation AG is a charter airline based in Kloten, Switzerland. The company was founded in 1987 by Helene Niedhart and is still managed by her today.

== Fleet ==
The Cat Aviation fleet includes the following aircraft (as of September 2020):

| Aircraft | In service | ordered | Aircraft registration | Comment(s) | Seats |
|---|---|---|---|---|---|
| Falcon 2000LX | 1 | | HB-IGU | | 10 |
| Falcon 7X | 3 | | HB-JSS, HB-JST, HB-JOB | | 13 |
| Hawker 125-800A | 1 | | HB-VHV | | 8 |
| Total | 5 | – | | | |
