= Choice Airways =

Airline of the United States

IATA	ICAO	Call sign
—	CSX	CHOICE AIR
- Founded: March 27, 2009
- Hubs: Fort Lauderdale Executive Airport
- Focus cities: Hugo Chávez International Airport, Cap-Haïtien, Haiti
- Fleet size: 2
- Parent company: Choice Airways, Inc.
- Headquarters: Fort Lauderdale, Florida, U.S.
- Key people: Stonn Desrosiers, President
- Website: www.choiceairways.net

Choice Airways is an American charter airline based in Fort Lauderdale, Florida.

== History ==
The airline was established on March 27, 2009 and started its operations using Metroliner III's.

In December 2014, the airline sponsored a toy drive to an orphanage in Haiti.

== Fleet ==
As of December 2014, the Choice Airways fleet consists of the following aircraft:

Choice Airways fleet
Aircraft	In service	Passengers (Business/Economy)
Metroliner III SA-227DC	1	8
Beechcraft Baron	1	5
Total	2	13
