= Century Aviation =

Century Aviation SA de CV
IATA	ICAO	Call sign
—	URY	—
- Commenced operations: 2003; 23 years ago
- Ceased operations: 2003; 23 years ago
- Fleet size: 2 (planned)

Century Aviation SA de CV was a project of a charter airline. The project was launched in mid-2003 planning flights between Mexico City and China, but the commencement of the Gulf War and the SARS epidemic caused the cancellation of the project in the same year. The planned fleet was 2 Boeing 757-200s with all-business class configuration.

== History ==
The project was launched in 2003.
