= Champagne Airlines =

1998–2005 airline in France

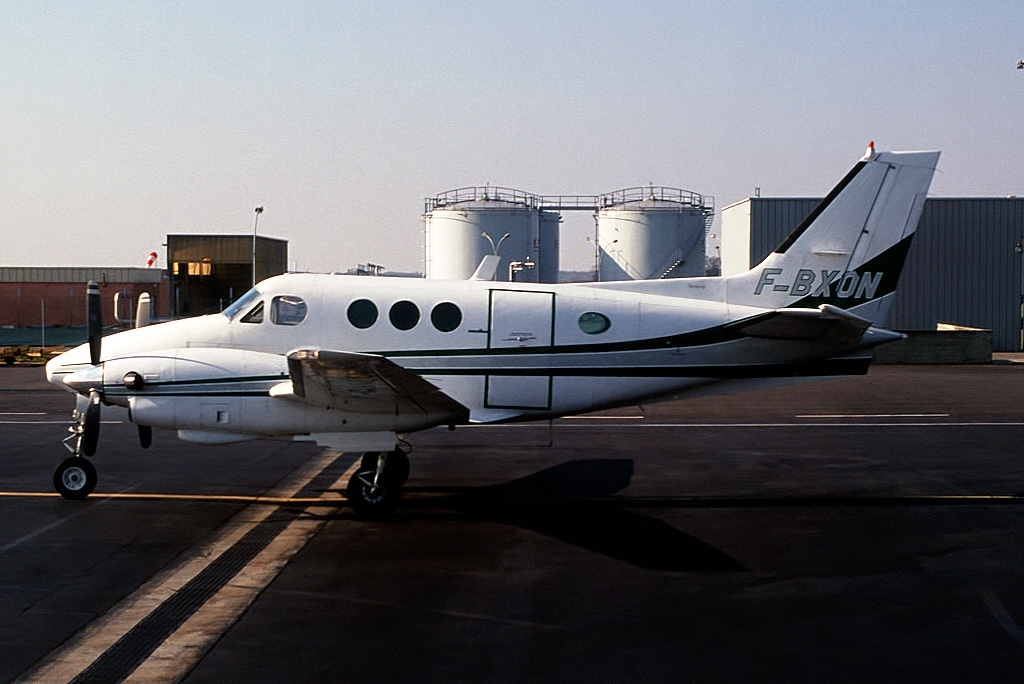
- Beechcraft King Air
IATA	ICAO	Call sign
—	CPH	CHAMPAGNE
- Commenced operations: 1998
- Ceased operations: 29 November 2005
- Fleet size: See Fleet below
- Destinations: See Destinations below

Champagne Airlines was an airline based in Reims, France. It was established in 1998 and operated air-taxi, executive services, and scheduled services. Its main base was Reims Airport (RHE), with hubs at Le Havre Octeville Airport and Paris - Le Bourget Airport. Heli-Champagne, its sister company, provided helicopter transport services.

In November 2005, authorization to operate air services was withdrawn following bankruptcy.

== Code data ==
- ICAO Code: CPH
- Callsign: Champagne

== Destinations ==
In July 2005, it was clear that the company was in debt and had a serious shortage of cash. In October 2005, Champagne Airlines gave up its only scheduled route between Le Havre and Toulouse. On 29 November 2005 the Direction Générale de l'Aviation Civile (DGAC) withdrew authorization for Champagne Airlines to operate air services following its bankruptcy.

== Fleet ==
In July 2005, the Champagne Airlines fleet consisted of the following aircraft:

- 2 Beechcraft King Air FGIML and FBXON
- 3 Fairchild Metro III FGTRB, FGPSN and FGJPN
- 1 Cessna Citation II FHACA
