= Click Airways =

Airline based in Sharjah, United Arab Emirates

IATA	ICAO	Call sign
C4	CGK	CLICK AIR
- Founded: 2004
- Hubs: Sharjah International Airport
- Fleet size: 4
- Destinations: 5
- Headquarters: Sharjah, United Arab Emirates

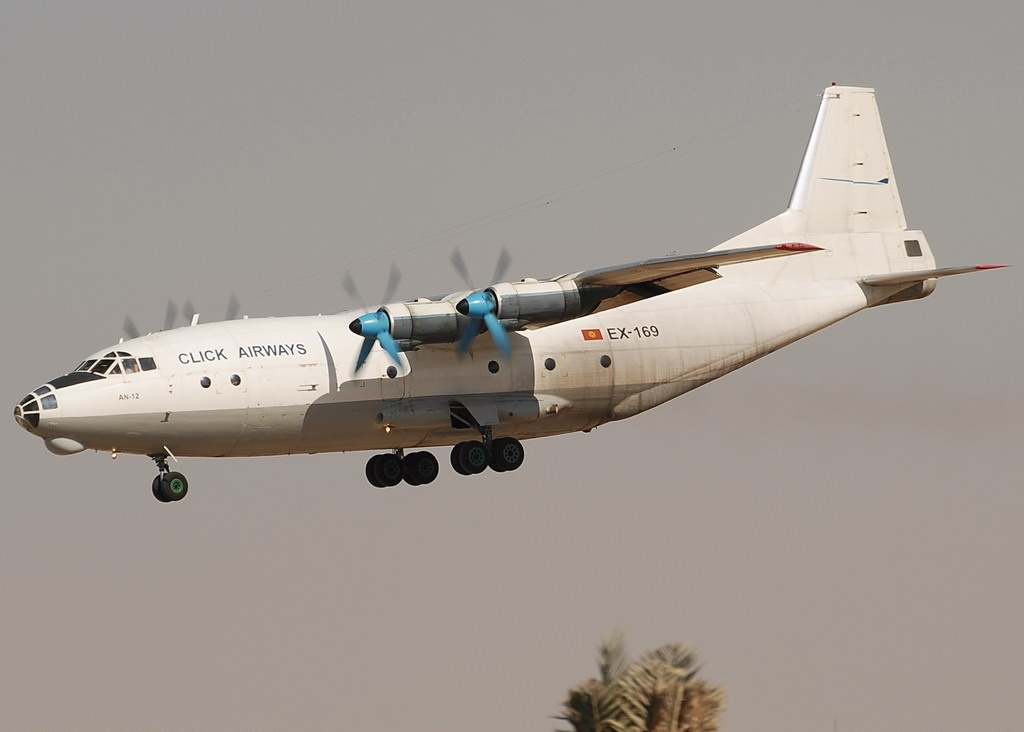
A Click Airways Antonov An-12BP landing at Sharjah International Airport, United Arab Emirates in 2007.

Click Airways was an airline based in Sharjah, United Arab Emirates. It was established in 2004 and its main base was Sharjah International Airport.

The airline was on the List of air carriers banned in the European Union.

== Destinations ==
At 6 May 2007 Click Airways was operating services from Sharjah to:

- Afghanistan
  - Bagram – Bagram Air Base
  - Kabul – Kabul International Airport
  - Kandahar – Kandahar International Airport
- Djibouti
  - Djibouti City – Ambouli Airport
- Iraq
  - Baghdad – Baghdad International Airport

== Fleet ==
The Click Airways fleet consisted of the following aircraft (at March 2007):

- 2 Antonov An-12 Cub
- 1 Ilyushin Il-76MD Candid
- 1 ashok Il-76TD Candid
