= List of Norwegian Air Shuttle tail fin heroes and fleet =

Norwegian Air Shuttle ASA
IATA	ICAO	Call sign
DY	NAX	NOR SHUTTLE
- Subsidiaries: Norwegian Air Argentina; Norwegian Air International; Norwegian Air Sweden; Norwegian Air UK; Norwegian Long Haul
- Website: norwegian.com

Norwegian Air Argentina
IATA	ICAO	Call sign
DN	NAA	NORUEGA

Norwegian Air International
IATA	ICAO	Call sign
D8	IBK	NORTRANS

Norwegian Air Sweden
IATA	ICAO	Call sign
LE	NSW	NORDIC

Norwegian Air UK
IATA	ICAO	Call sign
DI	NRS	REDNOSE

Norwegian Long Haul
IATA	ICAO	Call sign
DU	NLH	NORSTAR

This is a list of aircraft of Norwegian Air Shuttle and its subsidiaries for the individuals that are currently, or have previously been portrayed on the fleet.

Norwegian's livery consists of a red nose, followed by a blue ribbon and white, with the vertical stabilizer initially featuring historically distinctive Norwegians, Swedes, Danes, and Finns, but has since expanded to individuals of other nationalities across Europe and the Americas. An element of the airline's branding, the airline calls the practice its "Tail Fin Heroes" program, claiming that the personalities together with the aircraft's red nose signals the airline's change-maker spirit.

Note that the list might not portray the current status of a particular aircraft; portrayed individuals may not be replaced or follow onto new aircraft when their aircraft is retired, or as new ones join the fleet, or the registration numbers of aircraft in production are yet to be determined. Some individuals have also been portrayed on more than one type of aircraft, whether at separate times or simultaneously, such as Sonja Henie, who has appeared on the Boeing 737-300, Boeing 737-800, and Boeing 787-8.

== In Fleet ==
Aircraft type	Registration number	Hero	Nation of hero	Operation	Remarks
Boeing 737-800	EI-FHA	Vilhelm Bjerknes	Norway	Norwegian Air International	Ex LN-DYY
Boeing 737-800	EI-FHD			Norwegian Air International	Tail art not yet applied, ex LN-DYX
Boeing 737-800	EI-FHE	Sonja Henie	Norway	Norwegian Air International	Ex LN-NOD
Boeing 737-800	EI-FHH	Evert Taube	Sweden	Norwegian Air International	Ex LN-NOV
Boeing 737-800	EI-FHJ			Norwegian Air International	Tail art not yet applied
Boeing 737-800	EI-FHK			Norwegian Air International	Tail art not yet applied
Boeing 737-800	EI-FHN	Carl Larsson	Sweden	Norwegian Air International	Ex LN-DYK
Boeing 737-800	EI-FHP	Søren Kierkegaard	Denmark	Norwegian Air International	Ex LN-DYH
Boeing 737-800	EI-FHR	Georg Brandes	Denmark	Norwegian Air International	Ex LN-DYJ
Boeing 737-800	EI-FHV	Jørgen Moe & Peter Christen Asbjørnsen	Norway	Norwegian Air International	Ex LN-DYR
Boeing 737-800	EI-FHW	Niels Henrik Abel	Norway	Norwegian Air International	Ex LN-DYS
Boeing 737-800	EI-FHX	Aasmund Olavson Vinje	Norway	Norwegian Air International	Ex LN-DYI
Boeing 737-800	EI-FHZ	André Bjerke	Norway	Norwegian Air International	Ex LN-DYM
Boeing 737-800	EI-FJA	Knud Rasmussen	Denmark	Norwegian Air International	Ex LN-NOY
Boeing 737-800	EI-FJC	Povel Ramel	Sweden	Norwegian Air International	Ex LN-NOR
Boeing 737-800	EI-FJE	Gidsken Jakobsen	Norway	Norwegian Air International	Ex LN-NOZ
Boeing 737-800	EI-FJG	Christian Krohg	Norway	Norwegian Air International	Ex LN-NOX
Boeing 737-800	EI-FJH			Norwegian Air International	Tail art not yet applied
Boeing 737-800	EI-FJI	Oda Krohg	Norway	Norwegian Air International	Ex LN-NOW
Boeing 737-800	EI-FJJ			Norwegian Air International	Tail art not yet applied
Boeing 737-800	EI-FJL			Norwegian Air International	Tail art not yet applied
Boeing 737-800	EI-FJT	Fredrika Bremer	Sweden	Norwegian Air International	
Boeing 737-800	EI-FJO			Norwegian Air International	Tail art not yet applied
Boeing 737-800	EI-FJP			Norwegian Air International	Tail art not yet applied
Boeing 737-800	EI-FJR	Sam Eyde	Norway	Norwegian Air International	Ex LN-NOI
Boeing 737-800	EI-FJS	Karin Larsson	Sweden	Norwegian Air International	
Boeing 737-800	EI-FJR	Fredrika Bremer	Sweden	Norwegian Air International	
Boeing 737-800	EI-FJV	Gustav Vigeland	Norway	Norwegian Air International	Ex LN-NOO
Boeing 737-800	EI-FJY	Clara Campoamor	Spain	Norwegian Air International	
Boeing 737-800	EI-FJZ	Christopher Polhem	Sweden	Norwegian Air International	
Boeing 737-800	EI-FVJ	Amy Johnson	United Kingdom	Norwegian Air International	
Boeing 737-800	EI-FVK	Dirch Passer	Denmark	Norwegian Air International	
Boeing 737-800	EI-FVM	Anne-Cath. Vestly	Norway	Norwegian Air International	'Rewarding more than 6.000.000 members' livery
Boeing 737-800	EI-FVN	Camilla Collet	Norway	Norwegian Air International	
Boeing 737-800	EI-FVR	Karin Boye	Sweden	Norwegian Air International	to Greater Bay Airlines in 2022
Boeing 737-800	EI-FVT			Norwegian Air International	Tail art no longer applied, ex LV-ISQ
Boeing 737-800	EI-FVU			Norwegian Air International	Tail art not yet applied
Boeing 737-800	EI-FVV			Norwegian Air International	Tail art not yet applied
Boeing 737-800	EI-FVW	Richard Møller Nielsen	Denmark	Norwegian Air International	
Boeing 737-800	EI-FVX	Freddie Mercury	United Kingdom	Norwegian Air International	
Boeing 737-800	EI-FVY	Aleksis Kivi	Finland	Norwegian Air International	
Boeing 737-800	EI-FVZ	Jan Baalsrud	Norway	Norwegian Air International	
Boeing 737-800	EI-GBB	Edvard Munch	Norway	Norwegian Air International	Ex LN-NOF
Boeing 737-800	EI-GBF	Johan Falkberget	Norway	Norwegian Air International	Ex LN-NGK
Boeing 737-800	EI-GBG	Frits Thaulow	Norway	Norwegian Air International	Ex LN-NGL
Boeing 737-800	EI-GBI	Minna Canth	Finland	Norwegian Air International	
Boeing 737-800	LN-DYT	Kirsten Flagstad	Norway	Norwegian Air Shuttle	
Boeing 737-800	LN-DYU	Jørn Utzon	Denmark	Norwegian Air Shuttle	
Boeing 737-800	LN-NGD	Ivo Caprino	Norway	Norwegian Air Shuttle	
Boeing 737-800	LN-NGM	Carl Nielsen	Denmark	Norwegian Air Shuttle	Ex EI-FHI, G-NRWY
Boeing 737-800	LN-NGN	Georg Sverdrup	Norway	Norwegian Air Shuttle	
Boeing 737-800	LN-NGP	Ivar Aasen	Norway	Norwegian Air Shuttle	
Boeing 737-800	LN-NGS	Regine Normann	Norway	Norwegian Air Shuttle	
Boeing 737-800	LN-NGX			Norwegian Air Shuttle	Tail art not yet applied
Boeing 737-800	LN-NGY	Sigrid Undset	Norway	Norwegian Air Shuttle	
Boeing 737-800	LN-NGZ			Norwegian Air Shuttle	Tail art not yet applied
Boeing 737-800	LN-NHA	Carl von Linné	Sweden	Norwegian Air Shuttle	
Boeing 737-800	LN-NHB			Norwegian Air Shuttle	Tail art not yet applied
Boeing 737-800	LN-NHC			Norwegian Air Shuttle	Tail art not yet applied
Boeing 737-800	LN-NHD			Norwegian Air Shuttle	Tail art not yet applied
Boeing 737-800	LN-NIA	Johan Ludvig Runeberg	Finland	Norwegian Air Shuttle	
Boeing 737-800	LN-NIB	Helmer Hanssen	Norway	Norwegian Air Shuttle	
Boeing 737-800	LN-NIC	Fredrikke Marie Qvam	Norway	Norwegian Air Shuttle	
Boeing 737-800	LN-NID	Christina Nilsson	Sweden	Norwegian Air Shuttle	
Boeing 737-800	LN-NIE	Asta Nielsen	Denmark	Norwegian Air Shuttle	
Boeing 737-800	LN-NIG	Juan Sebastián Elcano	Spain	Norwegian Air Shuttle	
Boeing 737-800	LN-NIH	Christopher Columbus	Italy	Norwegian Air Shuttle	
Boeing 737-800	LN-NII	Jacob Ellehammer	Denmark	Norwegian Air Shuttle	
Boeing 737-800	LN-NIM	Camilla Collett	Norway	Norwegian Air Shuttle AOC	
Boeing 737-800	LV-HQH	Astor Piazzolla	Argentina	Norwegian Air Argentina	Ex EI-FVO
Boeing 737-800	LV-IQZ	Santiago Ramón y Cajal	Spain	Norwegian Air Argentina	Ex EI-FVP
Boeing 737-800	LV-ITK	Benito Pérez Galdós	Spain	Norwegian Air Argentina	Ex EI-FVS
Boeing 737-800	SE-RPA	Roald Dahl	United Kingdom	Norwegian Air Sweden	Ex EI-FJW
Boeing 737-800	SE-RPB	John Bauer	Sweden	Norwegian Air Sweden	Ex EI-FHS, LN-NGJ
Boeing 737-800	SE-RPC	Gloria Fuertes	Spain	Norwegian Air Sweden	Ex EI-FJX
Boeing 737-800	SE-RPD			Norwegian Air Sweden	Tail art not yet applied, ex EI-FJN
Boeing 737-800	SE-RPE			Norwegian Air Sweden	Tail art not yet applied, ex EI-FJM
Boeing 737-800	SE-RPI			Norwegian Air Sweden	Tail art not yet applied, ex EI-FJK
Boeing 737-800	SE-RPM			Norwegian Air Sweden	Tail art not yet applied, ex EI-FJU
Boeing 737-800	SE-RPR	Nikolai Frederik Severin Grundtvig	Denmark	Norwegian Air Sweden	Ex EI-FJB
Boeing 737-800	SE-RPS			Norwegian Air Sweden	Tail art no longer applied, ex EI-FJD
Boeing 737-800	SE-RPT			Norwegian Air Sweden	Tail art not yet applied, ex LN-NHK, EI-FHM
Boeing 737-800	SE-RPU			Norwegian Air Sweden	Tail art not yet applied, ex LN-NHJ, EI-FHL
Boeing 737-800	SE-RRA	Erik Bye	Norway	Norwegian Air Sweden	Ex LN-DYA
Boeing 737-800	SE-RRB	Bjørnstjerne Bjørnson	Norway	Norwegian Air Sweden	Ex LN-DYB
Boeing 737-800	SE-RRC	Max Manus	Norway	Norwegian Air Sweden	Ex LN-DYC
Boeing 737-800	SE-RRD			Norwegian Air Sweden	Tail art not yet applied, ex LN-DYD
Boeing 737-800	SE-RRE	Ludvig Holberg	Norway	Norwegian Air Sweden	Ex LN-DYE
Boeing 737-800	SE-RRF	Fridtjof Nansen	Norway	Norwegian Air Sweden	Ex LN-DYF
Boeing 737-800	SE-RRG	Jenny Lind	Sweden	Norwegian Air Sweden	Ex LN-DYG
Boeing 737-800	SE-RRH			Norwegian Air Sweden	Tail art not yet applied, ex LN-NHG
Boeing 737-800	SE-RRI			Norwegian Air Sweden	Tail art not yet applied, ex LN-NHE
Boeing 737-800	SE-RRJ	Jens Moe	Norway	Norwegian Air Sweden	Ex LN-NIJ
Boeing 737-800	SE-RRN	Karen Blixen	Denmark	Norwegian Air Sweden	Ex LN-DYN
Boeing 737-800	SE-RRO	Otto Sverdrup	Norway	Norwegian Air Sweden	Ex LN-DYO
Boeing 737-800	SE-RRP	Aksel Sandemose	Denmark	Norwegian Air Sweden	Ex LN-DYP
Boeing 737-800	SE-RRS	Helge Ingstad	Norway	Norwegian Air Sweden	Ex LN-DYQ
Boeing 737-800	SE-RRT	Amalie Skram	Norway	Norwegian Air Sweden	Ex EI-FHT, LN-DYL
Boeing 737-800	SE-RRU	Wenche Foss	Norway	Norwegian Air Sweden	Ex EI-FHY, LN-NGI
Boeing 737-800	SE-RRV	Rosalía de Castro	Spain	Norwegian Air Sweden	Ex EI-FVL
Boeing 737-800	SE-RRX	Anders Zorn	Sweden	Norwegian Air Sweden	Ex EI-FHU, LN-NGH
Boeing 737-800	SE-RRY	Gustaf Dalén	Sweden	Norwegian Air Sweden	Ex EI-FVI
Boeing 737-800	SE-RRZ	Jean Sibelius	Finland	Norwegian Air Sweden	Ex EI-FVH
Boeing 737 MAX 8	EI-FYD	Benjamin Franklin	United States	Norwegian Air International	
Boeing 737 MAX 8	EI-FYE	Sojourner Truth	United States	Norwegian Air International	
Boeing 737 MAX 8	LN-BKA	Oscar Wilde	Ireland	Norwegian Air Shuttle	
Boeing 737 MAX 8	LN-BKB	Mark Twain	United States	Norwegian Air Shuttle	
Boeing 737 MAX 8	LN-BKC	UNICEF		Norwegian Air Shuttle	
Boeing 737 MAX 8	LN-FGF	Karin Boye	Sweden	Norwegian Air Shuttle AOC	
Boeing 737 MAX 8	LN-FGG	Kim Friele	Norway	Norwegian Air Shuttle AOC	
Boeing 737 MAX 8	LN-FGH	Anders Celsius	Sweden	Norwegian Air Shuttle AOC	
Boeing 737 MAX 8	LN-FGI	Piet Hein	Denmark	Norwegian Air Shuttle AOC	
Boeing 737 MAX 8	LN-FGJ	Knud Rasmussen	Greenland	Norwegian Air Shuttle AOC	
Boeing 737 MAX 8	SE-RTA	Charles Lindbergh	United States	Norwegian Air Sweden	
Boeing 737 MAX 8	SE-RTB	Elsa Beskow	Sweden	Norwegian Air Sweden	
Boeing 737 MAX 8	SE-RTC	Félix Rodríguez de la Fuente	Spain	Norwegian Air Sweden	
Boeing 737 MAX 8	SE-RTD			Norwegian Air Sweden	Delivery postponed
Boeing 737 MAX 8	SE-RTE			Norwegian Air Sweden	Delivery postponed
Boeing 737 MAX 8	SE-RTF			Norwegian Air Sweden	Delivery postponed
Boeing 737 MAX 8	SE-RTG			Norwegian Air Sweden	Delivery postponed
Boeing 737 MAX 8	SE-RTH	Minna Canth		Norwegian Air Sweden	Delivery postponed
Boeing 737 MAX 8	SE-RTI			Norwegian Air Sweden	Delivery postponed
Boeing 737 MAX 8	SE-RTJ			Norwegian Air Sweden	Delivery postponed
Boeing 737 MAX 8	SE-RYA	Marco Polo	Italy	Norwegian Air Sweden	Ex LN-BKD
Boeing 737 MAX 8	SE-RYB	Hans Borli	Norway	Norwegian Air Sweden	Ex LN-BKE
Boeing 737 MAX 8	SE-RYC	Theodor Kittelsen	Norway	Norwegian Air Sweden	Ex LN-BKF
Boeing 737 MAX 8	SE-RYF	Clara Barton	United States	Norwegian Air Sweden	Ex EI-FYF
Boeing 737 MAX 8	SE-RYJ	Sir Freddie Laker	United Kingdom	Norwegian Air Sweden	Ex EI-FYA
Boeing 737 MAX 8	SE-RYK	Tom Crean	Ireland	Norwegian Air Sweden	Ex EI-FYB
Boeing 737 MAX 8	SE-RYL	Jonathan Swift	Ireland	Norwegian Air Sweden	Ex EI-FYC
Boeing 737 MAX 8	SE-RYG	María Zambrano	Spain	Norwegian Air Sweden	Ex EI-FYG
Boeing 737 MAX 8	SE-RYH	Tycho Brahe	Denmark	Norwegian Air Sweden	Ex EI-FYH
Boeing 737 MAX 8	SE-RYI	Arthur Collins	United States	Norwegian Air Sweden	Ex EI-FYI
Boeing 787-8	LN-LNA	Sonja Henie	Norway	Norwegian Long Haul	Ex EI-LNA
Boeing 787-8	LN-LNB	Thor Heyerdahl	Norway	Norwegian Long Haul	Ex EI-LNB
Boeing 787-8	LN-LNC			Norwegian Long Haul	Tail art not yet applied, ex EI-LNC
Boeing 787-8	LN-LND	Grete Waitz	Norway	Norwegian Long Haul	Ex EI-LND
Boeing 787-8	LN-LNE	Roald Amundsen	Norway	Norwegian Long Haul	Ex EI-LNE
Boeing 787-8	LN-LNF			Norwegian Long Haul	Tail art not yet applied, ex EI-LNF
Boeing 787-8	LN-LNG	Edvard Munch	Norway	Norwegian Long Haul	Ex EI-LNG
Boeing 787-8	LN-LNH	H.C. Andersen	Denmark	Norwegian Long Haul	Ex EI-LNH
Boeing 787-9	G-CKOF	Joan Miró	Spain	Norwegian Air UK	
Boeing 787-9	G-CKOG	Paco de Lucia	Spain	Norwegian Air UK	
Boeing 787-9	G-CKWA	Joseph & Etienne de Montgolfier	France	Norwegian Air UK	
Boeing 787-9	G-CKWB	Arthur Collins	United States	Norwegian Air UK	
Boeing 787-9	G-CKWC	Robert Burns	United Kingdom	Norwegian Air UK	
Boeing 787-9	G-CKWD	Ernest Shackleton	United Kingdom	Norwegian Air UK	
Boeing 787-9	G-CKWE	Jane Austen	United Kingdom	Norwegian Air UK	
Boeing 787-9	G-CKWF	Charles Lindbergh	United States	Norwegian Air UK	
Boeing 787-9	G-CKWN	Oscar Wilde	Ireland	Norwegian Air UK	
Boeing 787-9	G-CKWP	Mark Twain	United States	Norwegian Air UK	
Boeing 787-9	G-CKWS	Félix Rodríguez de la Fuente	Spain	Norwegian Air UK	
Boeing 787-9	G-CKWT	Harvey Milk	United States	Norwegian Air UK	
Boeing 787-9	G-CKWU	Grazia Deledda	Italy	Norwegian Air UK	
Boeing 787-9	G-CLJN	James Fitzmaurice	Ireland	Norwegian Air UK	Delivery postponed
Boeing 787-9	LN-LNI	Greta Garbo	Sweden	Norwegian Long Haul	Ex EI-LNI
Boeing 787-9	LN-LNJ	Ole Bull	Norway	Norwegian Long Haul	Ex EI-LNJ
Boeing 787-9	LN-LNK	Victor Borge	Denmark	Norwegian Long Haul	Ex G-CIXO
Boeing 787-9	LN-LNL	Kirsten Flagstad	Norway	Norwegian Long Haul	
Boeing 787-9	LN-LNN	Karen Blixen	Denmark	Norwegian Long Haul	Ex G-CJUI
Boeing 787-9	LN-LNO	Roald Dahl	United Kingdom	Norwegian Long Haul	Ex G-CJUL
Boeing 787-9	LN-LNP	Amy Johnson	United Kingdom	Norwegian Long Haul	Ex G-CKHL
Boeing 787-9	LN-LNR	Freddie Mercury	United Kingdom	Norwegian Long Haul	Ex G-CKNA
Boeing 787-9	LN-LNS	Tom Crean	Ireland	Norwegian Long Haul	Ex G-CKKL, 600th 787 Dreamliner built
Boeing 787-9	LN-LNT	UNICEF		Norwegian Long Haul	Ex G-CKLZ
Boeing 787-9	LN-LNU	Babe Ruth	United States	Norwegian Long Haul	Ex G-CKMU
Boeing 787-9	LN-LNV	Jonathan Swift	Ireland	Norwegian Long Haul	Ex G-CKNY
Boeing 787-9	LN-LNX	Carl von Linné	Sweden	Norwegian Long Haul	Ex G-CJGI
Boeing 787-9	SE-RXA	Rita Levi-Montalcini	Italy	Norwegian Air Sweden	Delivery postponed
Boeing 787-9	SE-RXB	Edith Piaf	France	Norwegian Air Sweden	Delivery postponed
Boeing 787-9	SE-RXC	Emmeline Pankhurst	United Kingdom	Norwegian Air Sweden	Delivery postponed
Boeing 787-9	SE-RXM	Asger Jorn	Denmark	Norwegian Air Sweden	
Boeing 787-9	SE-RXY	Xul Solar	Argentina	Norwegian Air Sweden	
Boeing 787-9	SE-RXZ	Freddie Laker	United Kingdom	Norwegian Air Sweden	Ex G-CKNZ

== Heroes by country ==
Country	Heroes
Norway	43
Sweden	18
Denmark	16
Spain	10
United Kingdom	8
United States	8
Finland	4
Ireland	4
Italy	4
France	3
Argentina	2

== Out of Fleet ==
Aircraft type	Registration number	Hero	Nation of hero	Operation	Remarks
Boeing 737-300	LN-KKH	Otto Sverdrup	Norway	Norwegian Air Shuttle	To Belavia in 2011
Boeing 737-300	LN-KKF	Fridtjof Nansen	Norway	Norwegian Air Shuttle	To Somon Air in 2011
Boeing 737-300	LN-KKG	Gidsken Jakobsen	Norway	Norwegian Air Shuttle	Replaced by B737-800 by 2014
Boeing 737-300	LN-KKI	Helge Ingstad	Norway	Norwegian Air Shuttle	To Peruvian Airlines in 2013
Boeing 737-300	LN-KKM	Thor Heyerdahl	Norway	Norwegian Air Shuttle	Scrapped
Boeing 737-300	LN-KKP	Kirsten Flagstad	Norway	Norwegian Air Shuttle	To Kalstar Aviation in 2011
Boeing 737-300	LN-KKV	Niels Henrik Abel	Norway	Norwegian Air Shuttle	To Somon Air in 2011
Boeing 737-300	LN-KKW		Norway	Norwegian Air Shuttle	Donated to the Norwegian Aviation Museum
Boeing 737-500	LN-BRU	Thor Heyerdahl	Norway	Norwegian Air Shuttle	To Estonian Air in 2003
Boeing 737-800	EI-FJF	Selma Lagerlöf	Sweden	Norwegian Air International	Ex LN-NOH
Boeing 737-800	EI-FHC	6000th Boeing 737 built	Norway	Norwegian Air International	Ex LN-NOL, to Sriwijaya Air in 2017
Boeing 737-800	EI-FHF	Edvard Grieg	Norway	Norwegian Air International	Ex LN-NOB, to Aeroméxico in 2016
Boeing 737-800	EI-FHG	Tycho Brahe	Denmark	Norwegian Air International	Ex LN-NOJ, to Travel Service in 2018
Boeing 737-800	EI-FHO	Henrik Ibsen	Norway	Norwegian Air International	Ex LN-NOG
Boeing 737-800	LN-DYV	Elsa Beskow	Sweden	Norwegian Air Shuttle	To Jeju Air in 2018
Boeing 737-800	LN-DYW	Thorbjørn Egner	Norway	Norwegian Air Shuttle	To Jeju Air in 2019
Boeing 737-800	LN-DYZ	Aril Edvardsen	Norway	Norwegian Air Shuttle	To Jeju Air in 2019
Boeing 737-800	LN-KHD			Norwegian Air Shuttle	To Air Italy Polska in 2010
Boeing 737-800	LN-NGA	Ludvig Walentin Karlsen	Norway	Norwegian Air Shuttle	To Jeju Air in 2019
Boeing 737-800	LN-NGB	Geirr Tveitt	Norway	Norwegian Air Shuttle	To Jeju Air in 2019
Boeing 737-800	LN-NGC	Jens Glad Balchen	Norway	Norwegian Air Shuttle	To Jeju Air in 2019
Boeing 737-800	LN-NGE	UNICEF		Norwegian Air Shuttle	To Serene Air in 2020
Boeing 737-800	LN-NGF	Hans Christian Ørsted	Denmark	Norwegian Air Shuttle	To Fly Gangwon in 2019
Boeing 737-800	LN-NGG	Gunnar Sønsteby	Norway	Norwegian Air Shuttle	To Fly Gangwon in 2019
Boeing 737-800	LN-NGO	Victor Borge	Denmark	Norwegian Air Shuttle	To Turkish Airlines in 2019
Boeing 737-800	LN-NGQ			Norwegian Air Shuttle	To AnadoluJet in 2020
Boeing 737-800	LN-NGR			Norwegian Air Shuttle	To Joy Air in 2019
Boeing 737-800	LN-NGT	Anton K. H. Jakobsen	Norway	Norwegian Air Shuttle	To Joy Air in 2019
Boeing 737-800	LN-NGU	Harry S. Pettersen	Norway	Norwegian Air Shuttle	To AnadoluJet in 2020; Boeing's 1000th aircraft built with Sky interior
Boeing 737-800	LN-NGV			Norwegian Air Shuttle	To AnadoluJet in 2020
Boeing 737-800	LN-NGW	Theodor Kittelsen	Norway	Norwegian Air Shuttle	To AnadoluJet in 2020
Boeing 737-800	LN-NHF			Norwegian Air Shuttle	To Ruili Airlines in 2019
Boeing 737-800	LN-NOC	Ole Bull	Norway	Norwegian Air Shuttle	To Air Explore in 2015
Boeing 737-800	LN-NOE	Henrik Wergeland	Norway	Norwegian Air Shuttle	To Sriwijaya Air in 2016
Boeing 737-800	LN-NOM	Greta Garbo	Sweden	Norwegian Air Shuttle	To Meridiana in 2016
Boeing 737-800	LN-NON	Anders Celsius	Sweden	Norwegian Air Shuttle	To Ukraine International Airlines in 2016
Boeing 737-800	LN-NOP	Camilla Collet	Norway	Norwegian Air Shuttle	To ALROSA in 2015
Boeing 737-800	LN-NOQ	Kristian Birkeland	Norway	Norwegian Air Shuttle	To ALROSA in 2015
Boeing 737-800	LN-NOS	Ludvig Holberg	Norway	Norwegian Air Shuttle	To Sunwing Airlines in 2012
Boeing 737-800	LN-NOT	Piet Hein	Denmark	Norwegian Air Shuttle	To Jeju Air in 2018
Boeing 737-800	LN-NOU	Carl von Linné	Sweden	Norwegian Air Shuttle	To Ukraine International Airlines in 2016

== Special Liveries ==
Aircraft type	Registration number	Special livery	Operation	Remarks
Boeing 737-300	LN-KKR	Beach Volleyball World Tour 2005	Norwegian Air Shuttle	Out of fleet
Boeing 737-300	LN-KKR	Winter Season: Torino / Salzburg / Geneve / "Bestil skiferien nå!"	Norwegian Air Shuttle	Out of fleet
Boeing 737-300	LN-KKR	Kanditaten	Norwegian Air Shuttle	Out of fleet
Boeing 737-300	LN-KKS	Unite for Children UNICEF	Norwegian Air Shuttle	Out of fleet
Boeing 737-300	LN-KKW	Every child deserves a childhood – Norwegian supports UNICEF	Norwegian Air Shuttle	Out of fleet
Boeing 737-300	LN-KKW	Network Norway	Norwegian Air Shuttle	Out of fleet
Boeing 737-300	LN-KKW	Acta Norway	Norwegian Air Shuttle	Out of fleet
Boeing 737-300	LN-KKX	Network Norway	Norwegian Air Shuttle	Out of fleet
Boeing 737-300	LN-KKZ	Silver / www.fripolisen.no	Norwegian Air Shuttle	Out of fleet
Boeing 737-800	EI-FHC	6000th Boeing 737 built	Norwegian Air International	Out of fleet
Boeing 737-800	EI-FVM	Rewarding more than 6.000.000 members	Norwegian Air International	
Boeing 737-800	LN-DYU	Wireless Internet on board	Norwegian Air Shuttle	
Boeing 737-800	LN-NGE	Every child deserves a childhood – Norwegian supports UNICEF	Norwegian Air Shuttle	Out of fleet
Boeing 737 MAX 8	LN-BKC	Every child deserves a childhood – Norwegian supports UNICEF	Norwegian Air Shuttle	
Boeing 787-9	LN-LNT	For every child, a childhood – Norwegian supports UNICEF	Norwegian Long Haul	

== Arctic Aviation Assets ==
Arctic Aviation Assets Ltd is Norwegian's wholly owned leasing company and manages Norwegian's fleet. It leases out the ordered Airbus A320neo aircraft to other airlines.

Aircraft type	Registration number	Hero	Nation of hero	Operation	Remarks
Airbus A320neo	B-LCL			Norwegian's leasing company Arctic Aviation Assets	Leased out to HK Express
Airbus A320neo	B-LCM			Norwegian's leasing company Arctic Aviation Assets	Leased out to HK Express
Airbus A320neo	B-LCN			Norwegian's leasing company Arctic Aviation Assets	Leased out to HK Express
Airbus A320neo	B-LCO			Norwegian's leasing company Arctic Aviation Assets	Leased out to HK Express
Airbus A320neo	B-LCP			Norwegian's leasing company Arctic Aviation Assets	Leased out to HK Express
Airbus A320neo	B-303V			Norwegian's leasing company Arctic Aviation Assets	Leased out to Qingdao Airlines
Airbus A320neo	B-304R			Norwegian's leasing company Arctic Aviation Assets	Leased out to Qingdao Airlines
Airbus A320neo				Norwegian's leasing company Arctic Aviation Assets	
Airbus A320neo				Norwegian's leasing company Arctic Aviation Assets	
Airbus A320neo				Norwegian's leasing company Arctic Aviation Assets	
Airbus A320neo				Norwegian's leasing company Arctic Aviation Assets	
Airbus A320neo				Norwegian's leasing company Arctic Aviation Assets	
