= Norwegian Air Argentina =

Low-cost airline of Argentina (2017–2020)

Norwegian Air Argentina S.A.U.
IATA	ICAO	Call sign
DN	NAA	NORUEGA
- Founded: 25 January 2017
- Commenced operations: 16 October 2018
- Ceased operations: March 2020
- Operating bases: Aeroparque Jorge Newbery
- Frequent-flyer program: Norwegian Reward
- Parent company: Norwegian Air Shuttle (2017–2019); JetSmart (2019–2020)
- Key people: Ole Christian Melhus (CEO); Bjørn Kjos
- Employees: 120
- Website: www.norwegian.com/ar

Norwegian Air Argentina S.A.U. was an Argentine low-cost airline The airline operated Boeing 737-800 aircraft, with bases in Buenos Aires and Córdoba. All aircraft were registered in Argentina.

On 4 December 2019, parent company Norwegian Air Shuttle sold the airline to JetSmart, which took over operation of the airline and its license with immediate effect, with JetSmart planning to merge Norwegian Air Argentina's operations with those of JetSmart Argentina. By November 2020, the airline was inoperative, with its aircraft placed in long-term storage since March 2020, with the aircraft returning to Norwegian's operations in Europe at a later date.

== History ==
Norwegian Air Argentina was established on 25 January 2017, in order to access future traffic rights to and from Argentina and South America for the parent company. Norwegian Air Shuttle, Norwegian Air International, Norwegian Air UK and Norwegian Air Argentina share the same branding under the Norwegian Group.

The airline took delivery of its first aircraft, a Boeing 737-800, in mid-January 2018, and gained its air operator's certificate later that month. The aircraft was transferred from Norwegian's Irish subsidiary Norwegian Air International, and its Anders Celsius tailfin portrait was replaced by a portrait of Astor Piazzola, an Argentine musician. However, according to Bjørn Kjos, the parent company's CEO, due to delays in Boeing 737 MAX deliveries resulting in further delays to the airline starting service, the aircraft was transferred back to operate on the Norwegian Group's network in Europe while the start of operations was moved from August 2018 to October 2018.

In August 2018, Bjørn Kjos announced that the airline would begin selling tickets from 4 September 2018, for flights beginning service on 16 October 2018. Upon ticket reservations opening, the first planned services were revealed to operate from Buenos Aires Aeroparque to Córdoba, Mendoza, Neuquén, Puerto Iguazú, Salta, and San Carlos de Bariloche. In preparation for the inaugural start of operations, the airline's first Boeing 737-800 was transferred back from Norwegian Air International and flown from Stockholm Arlanda Airport to Ezeiza International Airport between 5 and 6 October 2018, with technical stops at Gran Canaria Airport and Greater Natal International Airport, before the aircraft was ferried to Aeroparque Jorge Newbery on 15 October 2018.

On 16 October 2018, Norwegian Air Argentina inaugurated service with three daily round trip flights; the first flight operated as flight DN 6022 from Buenos Aires Aeroparque to Córdoba, taking off at 07:41 and landing at 08:45 local time, followed by a round trip flight from Buenos Aires to Mendoza and a second daily frequency to Córdoba.

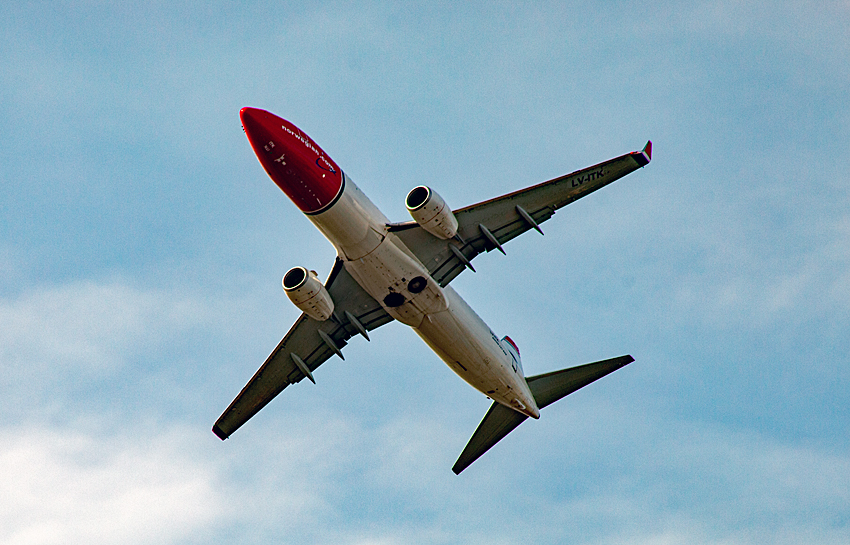
Boeing 737-800 departing Aeroparque Jorge Newbery

In April 2019, following the grounding of the Norwegian Group's Boeing 737 MAX 8 aircraft, the airline transferred one of its Boeing 737-800 aircraft back to Norwegian Air International to assist with the Norwegian Group's operations in Europe. In June 2019, the airline announced service to five additional destinations from Buenos Aires Aeroparque to begin from September 2019, consisting of Comodoro Rivadavia, Puerto Madryn, San Salavador de Jujuy, Trelew, and Ushuaia, however by September 2019, only the routes to San Salvador de Jujuy and Ushuaia ultimately launched.

Following the departure of Bjørn Kjos as parent company Norwegian Air Shuttle's CEO in July 2019, interim CEO Geir Karlsen stated that Norwegian Air Argentina's operations would be reviewed, with an August 2019 deadline for financial results to improve, and tickets for flights were not sold beyond 28 March 2020. On 4 December 2019, Norwegian Air Argentina was sold for an undisclosed amount to Indigo Partners subsidiary and Chilean low-cost airline JetSmart, which took over operations of the airline with immediate effect. For the months following the sale, JetSmart had planned to phase out the Norwegian brand and integrate the airline with its own Argentine airline JetSmart Argentina. Norwegian Air Argentina's three Boeing 737 aircraft, owned by Norwegian Air Shuttle but registered in Argentina, were not among the company's assets sold to JetSmart, and were planned to be returned to Norwegian's Europe-based operations while JetSmart would instate Airbus A320 family aircraft in their place.

In the months following the transfer of most of Norwegian Air Argentina's assets and operations to JetSmart in December 2019, JetSmart had wet-leased Norwegian's Boeing 737s to operate the airline's flights at Aeroparque while renaming the company to "JetSmart Regional". This was in contrast to JetSmart's operations at El Palomar Airport, which were separately listed as being operated by JetSmart Argentina, until JetSmart would launch its own A320 services at Aeroparque. JetSmart had also encountered obstacles during Norwegian Air Argentina's integration with JetSmart's own Argentina-based operations, including disagreements with unions representing Norwegian's employees over new job contracts following the retaining of their employment in the transfer, and that Argentina's Civil Aviation Administration had not yet authorized the transfer of Norwegian's route authorities to JetSmart Argentina in time for the return of Norwegian's 737s to Europe by the end of March 2020. In the uncertainty of its A320-based operations at Aeroparque going ahead, JetSmart sought to extend the wet-lease agreement of Norwegian's 737s to continue operating routes from Aeroparque, however following the COVID-19 pandemic and its impacts on aviation, JetSmart ended the agreement by the end of May 2020 and the 737s remained stored since that March.

== Destinations ==
On 25 October 2017, the National Civil Aviation Administration granted the airline permission to begin operations on 152 of the 156 routes it requested. The airline has also applied and been given approval for flights from Buenos Aires to Perth and has also requested to extend the flight to Singapore. This flight would route around Antarctica, taking advantage of the winds circling the continent.

The airline operated to the following destinations as of March 2020, prior to its aircraft being stored:

Country	City	Airport	Notes	Refs
Argentina	Buenos Aires	Aeroparque Jorge Newbery	Base	
Argentina	Córdoba	Ingeniero Aeronáutico Ambrosio L.V. Taravella International Airport		
Argentina	Mendoza	Governor Francisco Gabrielli International Airport		
Argentina	Neuquén	Presidente Perón International Airport		
Argentina	Puerto Iguazú	Cataratas del Iguazú International Airport		
Argentina	Salta	Martín Miguel de Güemes International Airport		
Argentina	San Carlos de Bariloche	San Carlos de Bariloche Airport		
Argentina	San Salvador de Jujuy	Gobernador Horacio Guzmán International Airport		
Argentina	Ushuaia	Ushuaia – Malvinas Argentinas International Airport		

== Fleet ==
The Norwegian Air Argentina fleet consisted of the following aircraft as of 19 March 2020, prior to being returned to Europe:

Norwegian Air Argentina fleet
Aircraft	In service	Orders	Passengers	Notes
Boeing 737-800	3	—	189	Originally transferred from Norwegian Air International. Originally planned to operate 10 aircraft. Wet leased from Norwegian Air Shuttle prior to storage.
Total	3	—		

== See also ==
- List of defunct airlines of Argentina
