= Norwegian Air Norway =

Low-cost airline of Norway (2013–2023)

Norwegian Air Norway AS
IATA	ICAO	Call sign
DH	NAN	NORSHIP
- Founded: 17 June 2013
- Ceased operations: 18 December 2023 (re-integrated into Norwegian Air Shuttle)
- AOC #: NO.AOC.085
- Operating bases: Oslo Airport, Gardermoen
- Frequent-flyer program: Norwegian Reward
- Destinations: see Norwegian Air Shuttle destinations
- Parent company: Norwegian Air Shuttle
- Headquarters: Fornebu, Norway
- Key people: Bjørn Kjos
- Website: www.norwegian.com

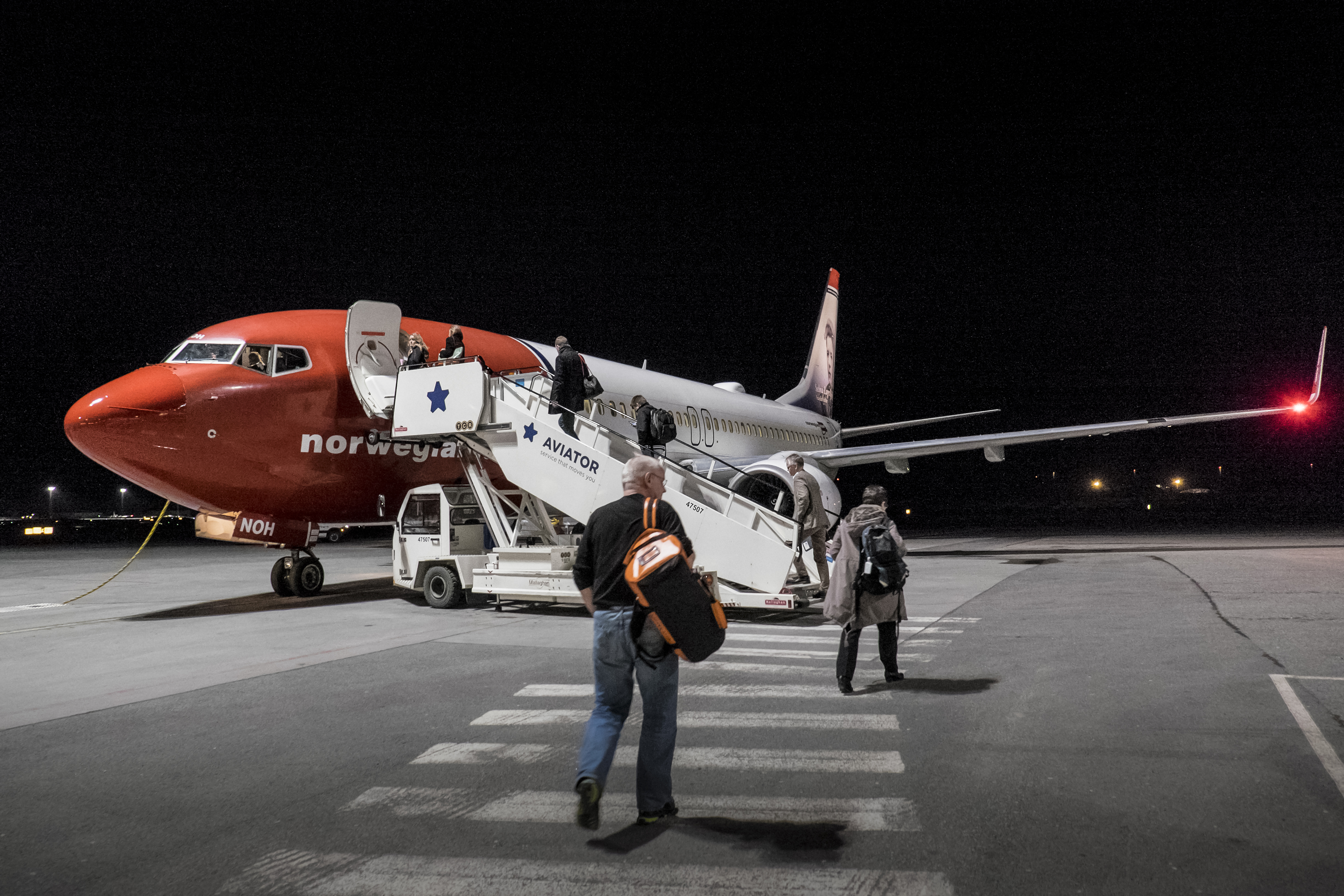
Norwegian Air Norway AS Boeing 737-800 at Oslo Airport

Norwegian Air Norway AS was a Norwegian airline and a fully integrated subsidiary of low-cost airline Norwegian Air Shuttle, using its corporate identity. The airline was based at Oslo Airport, Gardermoen, with its aircraft registered in Norway.

== History ==
Norwegian Air Norway was founded on 17 June 2013, and was subsequently issued an air operator's certificate (AOC). Parent company Norwegian Air Shuttle then registered a single aircraft to Norwegian Air Norway in order to retain the AOC. In October 2018, Norwegian Air Norway was granted an exception by the United States Department of Transportation to operate services to the country ahead of receiving a foreign air carrier permit, although the airline had yet to operate any flights under its associated airline codes as of 2021.

On 18 December 2023, the airline's only aircraft was returned to Norwegian Air Shuttle.

== Fleet ==
As of December 2023, the Norwegian Air Norway fleet comprised the following aircraft:

Norwegian Air Norway fleet
Aircraft	In service	Orders	Passengers	Notes
Boeing 737-800	1	—	186	Transferred to Norwegian Air Shuttle.
Total	1	—		
