= Norwegian Air International =

Airline of Ireland (2014–2021)

IATA	ICAO	Call sign
D8	IBK	NORTRANS
- Founded: February 2014
- Ceased operations: April 2021
- AOC #: IE 63/14
- Operating bases: Alicante; Barcelona; Billund; Copenhagen; Gran Canaria; Helsinki; Málaga; Tenerife–South
- Frequent-flyer program: Norwegian Reward
- Destinations: see List of Norwegian Air Shuttle destinations
- Parent company: Norwegian Air Shuttle
- Headquarters: Imbus House, Dublin Airport, Ireland
- Key people: Tore Jenssen (CEO); Bjørn Kjos
- Website: www.norwegian.com

Norwegian Air International was an Irish airline and fully integrated subsidiary of Norwegian Air Shuttle, using its corporate identity. It operated flights to destinations in Europe and the Middle East from various European bases, and was headquartered at Dublin Airport. Between 2017 and 2019, it also offered services from Europe to the United States and Canada. In the years following, its aircraft were gradually transferred to Swedish sister airline Norwegian Air Sweden and its parent company, until the last of its aircraft were transferred by April 2021, with its operations also taken over by the Swedish airline.

== History ==
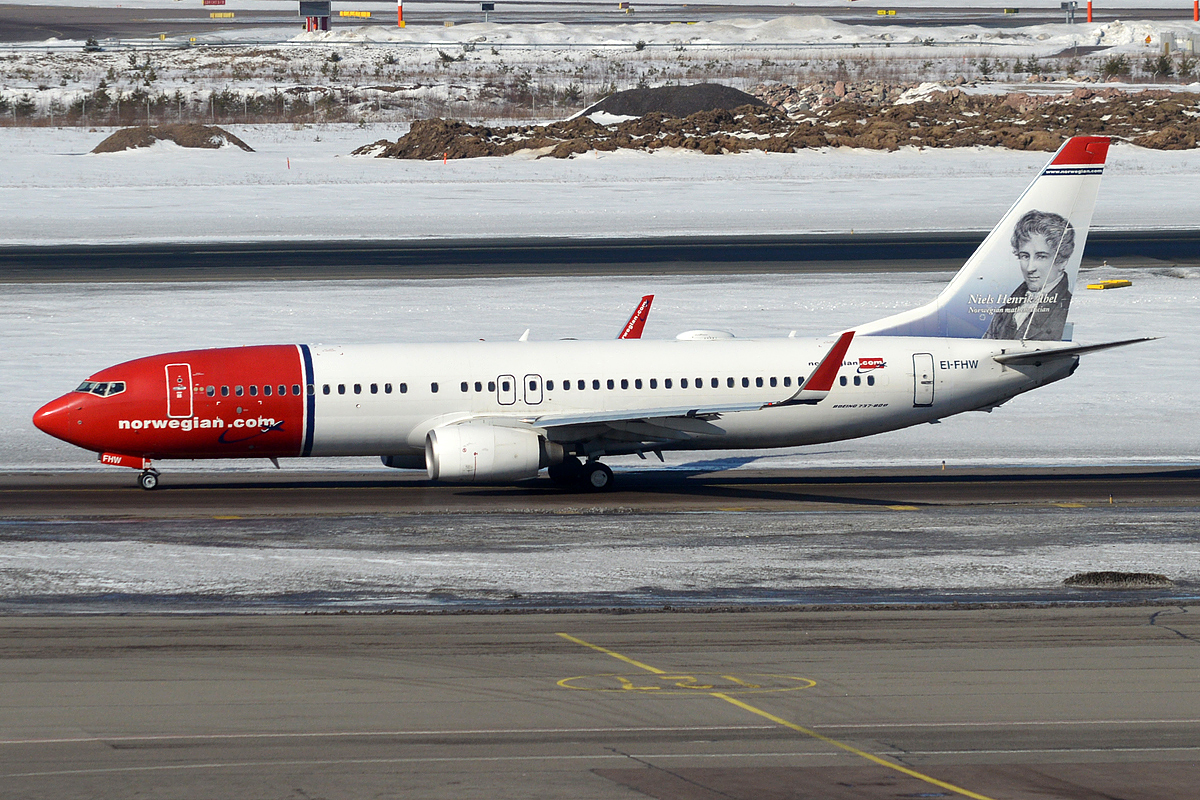
A former Norwegian Air International Boeing 737-800

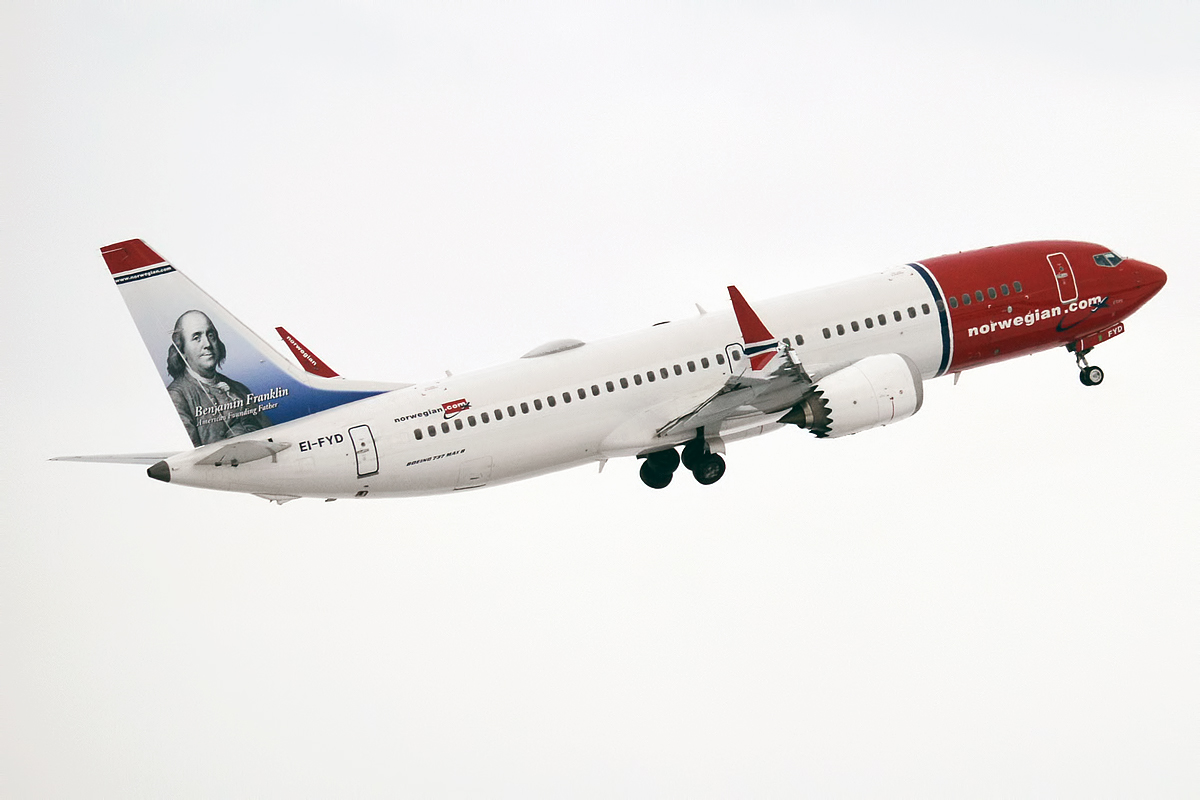
A former Norwegian Air International Boeing 737 MAX 8

In February 2014, Norwegian Air International received its operating licence and air operator's certificate issued by Ireland. Its flights were operated under its own IATA and ICAO airline codes, using its own fleet registered in Ireland. The airline shared the same branding with its parent Norwegian Air Shuttle and integrated subsidiaries as Norwegian Group airlines. Its registration within Ireland and outside Norway allowed the company to take advantage of European Union airline freedoms and agreements.

In February 2017, Norwegian Air International announced it would start transatlantic flights to the United States from the United Kingdom and Ireland in summer 2017 on behalf of its parent company, using the parent's new Boeing 737 MAX aircraft expected to be delivered from May 2017.

Norwegian Air International performed its first transatlantic flight with a Boeing 737-800 on 16 June 2017 between Edinburgh Airport and Stewart International Airport in Newburgh, New York. The first transatlantic flight with a 737 MAX was performed on 15 July 2017, with a MAX 8 featuring Sir Freddie Laker on its tailfin, between Edinburgh Airport in Scotland and Bradley International Airport serving Hartford, Connecticut, followed by a second daily rotation from Edinburgh to Stewart International Airport. Additional transatlantic flights using Boeing 737 aircraft were launched between destinations including Belfast, Bergen, Cork, Dublin, and Shannon in Europe to Hamilton, Hartford, Newburgh, and Providence in North America, however all transatlantic flights using the Boeing 737 were subsequently discontinued by 15 September 2019. On 11 May 2018, its US Department of Transportation approval was maintained by a judicial panel after being challenged by four unions representing 135,000 airline workers.

In March 2021, parent company Norwegian Air Shuttle's CFO Geir Karlsen reported that its Boeing 737 MAX fleet, some examples of which were registered to Norwegian Air International, would not resume operations and that the fleet would be retired. By April 2021, the remainder of its fleet was either returned to lessors or transferred to Norwegian Air Shuttle or Norwegian Air Sweden, while the flight operations and bases it maintained on behalf of the Norwegian Group were transferred to Norwegian Air Sweden. This allowed its parent company to further consolidate its structure of AOCs, by retiring its Irish AOC and maintaining its Swedish AOC for operations outside of Norway but within the rest of the EU.

== Destinations ==
Norwegian Air International operated in conjunction with parent company Norwegian Air Shuttle and its integrated subsidiaries, together forming Norwegian Group. The airline's operating bases were in countries outside of Norway and Sweden as part of Norwegian Group's collective route network, with the airline having bases in Denmark, Finland, Ireland, Spain, the United Kingdom, and the United States over the course of its history.

== Fleet ==
The Norwegian Air International fleet consisted of the following aircraft by April 2021:

Norwegian Air International fleet
Aircraft	In service	Orders	Passengers	Notes
Boeing 737-800	19	—	186	Transferred to Norwegian Air Shuttle or returned to lessors.
Total	19	—		

=== Historic fleet ===
Norwegian Air International previously operated the following aircraft prior to the closure and transferal of its operations and fleet:

Norwegian Air International former fleet
Aircraft	Total	Introduced	Retired	Notes
Boeing 737 MAX 8	9	2017	2021	All but two were transferred to Norwegian Air Sweden prior to retirement.
