= Jacob Schram =

Jacob Schram may refer to:

- Jacob Schram (1870–1952), Norwegian businessperson
- Jacob Schram (businessman), CEO of Norwegian Air Shuttle
- Jacob Schram, original owner of Schramsberg Vineyards, a winery in Napa Valley, California
- Rabbi Jacob Schram, a fictional character in the film Keeping the Faith
