= Norwegian Air Sweden =

Swedish airline

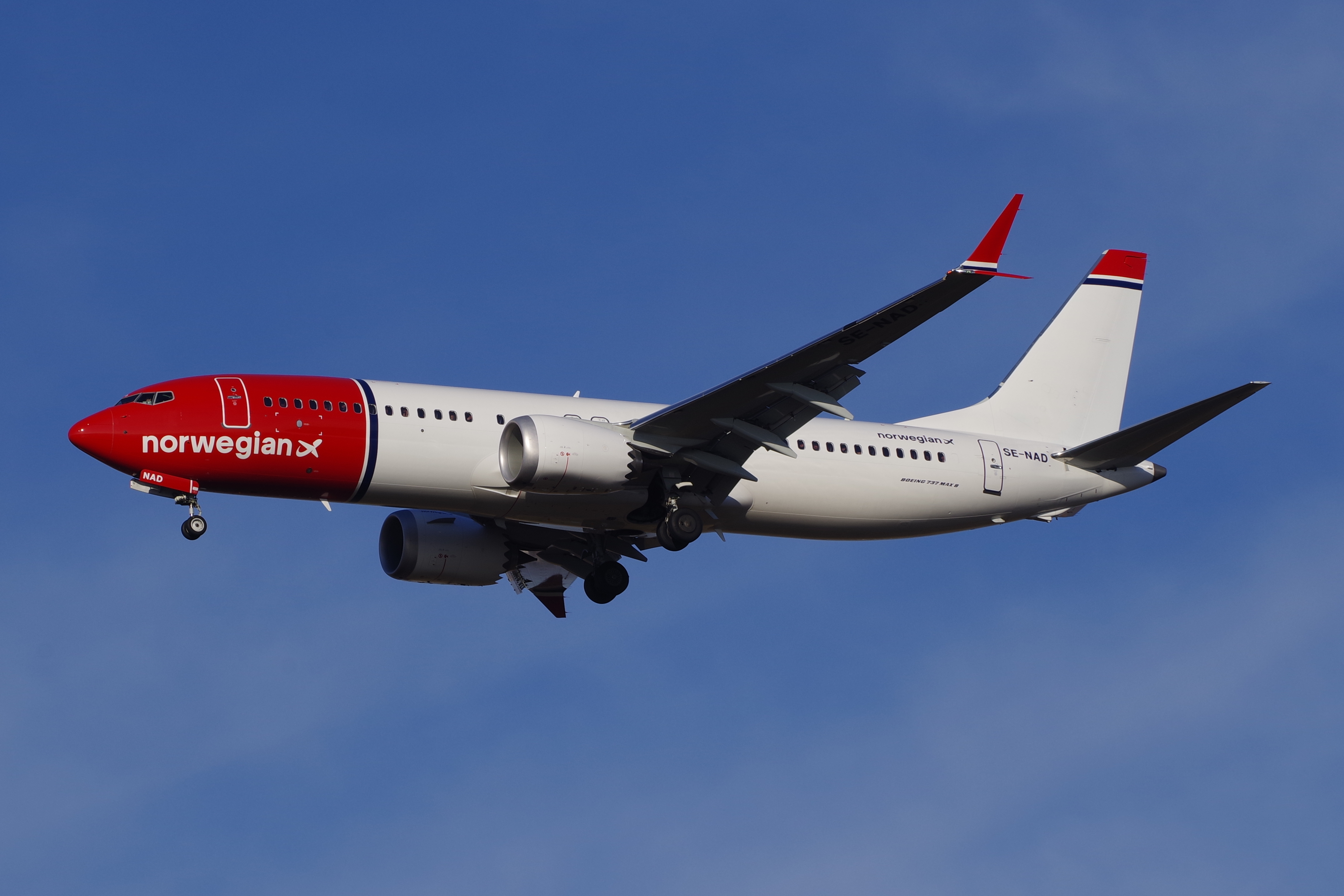
- Norwegian Air Sweden Boeing 737 MAX 8
IATA	ICAO	Call sign
D8	NSZ	REDNOSE
- Founded: 2018; 8 years ago
- AOC #: SE.AOC.0085 (2018–2021); SE.AOC.0089 (2021)
- Operating bases: Alicante; Copenhagen; Helsinki; Málaga; Stockholm–Arlanda
- Frequent-flyer program: Norwegian Reward
- Fleet size: 45
- Destinations: see Norwegian Air Shuttle destinations
- Parent company: Norwegian Air Shuttle
- Website: norwegian.com

Norwegian Air Sweden AOC AB is a Swedish airline and fully integrated subsidiary of low-cost airline Norwegian Air Shuttle, using its corporate identity. The airline operates Boeing 737 aircraft from bases in European countries outside of Norway on behalf of its parent company, with all aircraft registered in Sweden.

== History ==
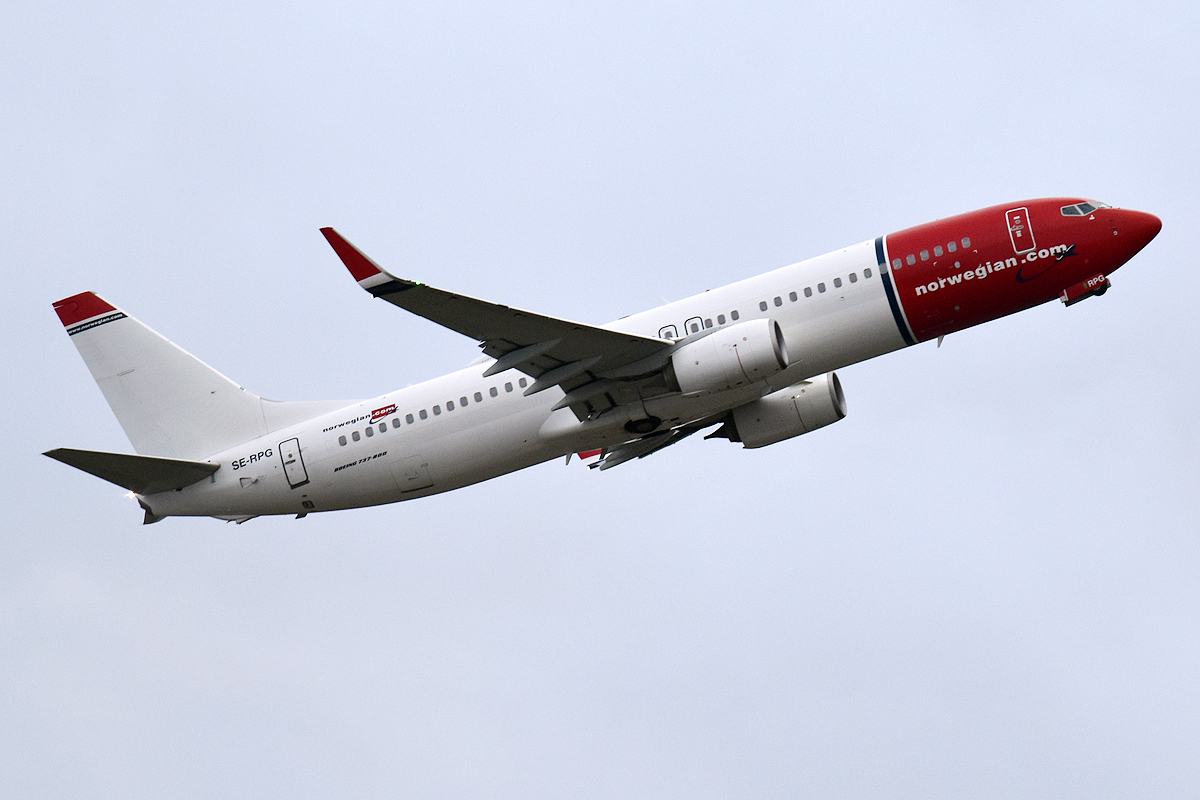
Norwegian Air Sweden Boeing 737-800

In July 2018, Norwegian Air Shuttle applied to the Swedish Transport Agency for a Swedish air operator's certificate (AOC), in order to gain access to additional traffic rights and launch new routes to and from Sweden for the parent company. On 20 November 2018, the airline, legally incorporated as Norwegian Air Sweden AB (IATA code LE, ICAO code NSW, callsign NORDIC), took delivery of its first aircraft, a Boeing 737 MAX 8, having received its air operator's certificate. The airline had since received additional aircraft both by direct delivery from Boeing and transferral from parent Norwegian Air Shuttle and its other integrated subsidiaries.

Starting in August 2019, the airline began operating some short-haul flights based at Oslo Gardermoen and Stockholm Arlanda on behalf of its parent company. The airline, then with Boeing 787-9 aircraft registered in its fleet, was to later take over the operation of various long-haul flights based at Rome Fiumicino during the following 2020 summer season, however, the long-haul operations between its parent and associated sister companies were initially suspended in March 2020 as a result of the COVID-19 pandemic and its impact on aviation. In January 2021, Norwegian Air Shuttle announced that all long-haul operations, which included long-haul services operated by Norwegian Air Sweden, would be terminated in order to focus on its European short-haul route network.

In March 2021, parent company Norwegian Air Shuttle's CFO Geir Karlsen reported that its Boeing 737 MAX fleet, some examples of which were registered to Norwegian Air Sweden, would not resume operations and that the fleet would be retired. By April 2021, the base and flight operations of Irish Norwegian Air International were transferred to Norwegian Air Sweden, after which the Swedish airline would inherit the operation of bases situated outside of Norway, but within the rest of the European Union (EU) on behalf of its parent company. On 4 May 2021, Norwegian announced the layoffs of 85 percent of its staff based in Spain due to the closure of all Spanish bases formerly operated by defunct Norwegian Air International, except its bases in Alicante and Málaga which would be kept following the job cuts.

On 10 May 2021, Norwegian transferred seven Boeing 737-800s registered to Norwegian Air Sweden to a newly founded Swedish operating subsidiary with its own AOC, which was legally incorporated as Norwegian Air Sweden AOC AB. This was followed by the reported bankruptcy of the previous Norwegian Air Sweden subsidiary as part of Norwegian Air Shuttle's restructuring process. During June 2021, Norwegian Air Sweden's remaining aircraft were transferred to Norwegian Air Sweden AOC, which would take over Norwegian's collective operations based outside of Norway. Operations under the new AOC began on 31 October 2021. By the end of the year, the airline resumed operation of the Boeing 737 MAX, having previously operated up to 13 of the type prior to its initial retirement.

== Destinations ==
Norwegian Air Sweden operates in conjunction with its parent company Norwegian Air Shuttle, together forming Norwegian Group. In addition to Sweden, the airline operates bases situated in countries outside of Norway for the airline group's collective route network.

== Fleet ==
=== Current fleet ===
As of October 2025, Norwegian Air Sweden operates an all-Boeing 737 fleet composed of the following aircraft:

Aircraft	In service	Orders	Passengers	Notes
Boeing 737-800	16	—	186	
Boeing 737-800	8	—	189	
Boeing 737 MAX 8	29	—	189	
Total	53	—		

=== Former fleet ===
Norwegian Air Sweden previously operated the following aircraft types:

Aircraft	Total	Introduced	Retired	Notes	Ref
Boeing 787-9	3	2019	2021		
