= Geir Karlsen =

Geir Karlsen may refer to:

- Geir Karlsen (football player) (1948-2024), a Norwegian goalie
- Geir Karlsen (businessman) (born 1965), a Norwegian business magnate
