= List of Norwegian Air Shuttle destinations =

This is a list of destinations served or previously served by Norwegian Air Shuttle and its integrated subsidiaries as of April 2021.

The list includes destinations collectively served by Norwegian Air Shuttle, its active integrated subsidiary Norwegian Air Sweden, as well as its defunct subsidiaries Norwegian Air Argentina, Norwegian Air International, Norwegian Air UK, and Norwegian Long Haul over the airline group's history. The list excludes airports only operated to by charter services.

It includes the destination's country (or applicable territory), city, airport name, with the airline's notable statuses marked if applicable, such as seasonality, as a base, as a future destination (with an accompanying launch date), or as a terminated destination.

== Map ==
Destinations of Norwegian Air Shuttle (May 2021)

Norwegian destinations
Seasonal
Future
Terminated

== Destinations ==
Country or territory	Town	Airport	Notes	Refs
Albania	Tirana	Tirana International Airport Nënë Tereza	Seasonal	
Argentina	Buenos Aires	Aeroparque Jorge Newbery	Terminated	
Argentina	Buenos Aires	Ministro Pistarini International Airport	Terminated	
Argentina	Córdoba	Ingeniero Aeronáutico Ambrosio L.V. Taravella International Airport	Terminated	
Argentina	Mendoza	Governor Francisco Gabrielli International Airport	Terminated	
Argentina	Neuquén	Presidente Perón International Airport	Terminated	
Argentina	Puerto Iguazú	Cataratas del Iguazú International Airport	Terminated	
Argentina	Salta	Martín Miguel de Güemes International Airport	Terminated	
Argentina	San Carlos de Bariloche	San Carlos de Bariloche Airport	Terminated	
Argentina	San Salvador de Jujuy	Gobernador Horacio Guzmán International Airport	Terminated	
Argentina	Ushuaia	Ushuaia – Malvinas Argentinas International Airport	Terminated	
Austria	Salzburg	Salzburg Airport	Terminated	
Austria	Vienna	Vienna International Airport		
Belgium	Brussels	Brussels Airport		
Bosnia and Herzegovina	Sarajevo	Sarajevo International Airport		
Brazil	Rio de Janeiro	Rio de Janeiro–Galeão International Airport	Terminated	
Bulgaria	Burgas	Burgas Airport	Seasonal	
Bulgaria	Sofia	Vasil Levski Sofia Airport	Seasonal	
Bulgaria	Varna	Varna Airport	Seasonal	
Canada	Hamilton	John C. Munro Hamilton International Airport	Terminated	
Canada	Montréal	Montréal–Pierre Elliott Trudeau International Airport	Terminated	
Croatia	Dubrovnik	Dubrovnik Airport	Seasonal	
Croatia	Pula	Pula Airport	Seasonal	
Croatia	Rijeka	Rijeka Airport	Terminated	
Croatia	Split	Split Airport	Seasonal	
Croatia	Zadar	Zadar	Seasonal	
Croatia	Zagreb	Zagreb Airport	Seasonal	
Cyprus	Larnaca	Larnaca International Airport		
Czech Republic	Prague	Václav Havel Airport Prague		
Denmark	Aalborg	Aalborg Airport		
Denmark	Aarhus	Aarhus Airport		
Denmark	Billund	Billund Airport		
Denmark	Bornholm	Bornholm Airport	Terminated	
Denmark	Copenhagen	Copenhagen Airport	Base	
Egypt	Hurghada	Hurghada International Airport		
Egypt	Giza	Sphinx International Airport		
Egypt	Sharm El Sheikh	Sharm El Sheikh International Airport	Terminated	
Estonia	Tallinn	Tallinn Airport		\
Finland	Helsinki	Helsinki Airport	Base	
Finland	Ivalo	Ivalo Airport	Terminated	
Finland	Kemi/Tornio	Kemi-Tornio Airport		
Finland	Kittilä	Kittilä Airport	Terminated	
Finland	Oulu	Oulu Airport		
Finland	Rovaniemi	Rovaniemi Airport		
Finland	Turku	Turku Airport	Terminated	
Finland	Vaasa	Vaasa Airport	Terminated	
France	Ajaccio	Ajaccio Napoleon Bonaparte Airport	Seasonal	
France	Bastia	Bastia – Poretta Airport	Seasonal	
France	Beauvais	Paris Beauvais Airport	Terminated	
France	Bordeaux	Bordeaux–Mérignac Airport	Terminated	
France	Grenoble	Grenoble–Isère Airport	Terminated	
France	Marseille	Marseille Provence Airport	Terminated	
France	Montpellier	Montpellier–Méditerranée Airport	Seasonal	
France	Nice	Nice Côte d'Azur Airport		
France	Paris	Charles de Gaulle Airport		
France	Paris	Orly Airport	Terminated	
France	Toulouse	Toulouse Blagnac Airport		
French Guiana	Cayenne	Cayenne – Félix Eboué Airport	Terminated	
Germany	Berlin	Berlin Brandenburg Airport		
Germany	Berlin	Berlin Schönefeld Airport	Airport closed	
Germany	Cologne	Cologne Bonn Airport	Terminated	
Germany	Düsseldorf	Düsseldorf Airport		
Germany	Frankfurt	Frankfurt Airport	Terminated	
Germany	Hamburg	Hamburg Airport		
Germany	Hanover	Hannover Airport	Terminated	
Germany	Munich	Munich Airport		
Greece	Athens	Athens International Airport	Seasonal	
Greece	Cephalonia	Cephalonia International Airport	Terminated	
Greece	Chania	Chania International Airport	Seasonal	
Greece	Corfu	Corfu International Airport	Seasonal	
Greece	Heraklion	Heraklion International Airport	Seasonal	
Greece	Kos	Kos International Airport	Seasonal	
Greece	Preveza	Aktion National Airport	Terminated	
Greece	Rhodes	Rhodes International Airport	Seasonal	
Greece	Santorini	Santorini (Thira) International Airport	Seasonal	
Greece	Thessaloniki	Thessaloniki Airport	Seasonal	
Guadeloupe	Pointe-à-Pitre	Pointe-à-Pitre International Airport	Terminated	
Hungary	Budapest	Budapest Ferenc Liszt International Airport		
Iceland	Reykjavík	Keflavík International Airport		
Ireland	Cork	Cork Airport	Terminated	
Ireland	Dublin	Dublin Airport		
Ireland	Shannon	Shannon Airport	Terminated	
Israel	Tel Aviv	Ben Gurion Airport	Resumes 1 April 2026	
Italy	Bari	Bari Karol Wojtyła Airport	Seasonal	
Italy	Bergamo	Milan Bergamo Airport	Seasonal	
Italy	Bologna	Bologna Guglielmo Marconi Airport	Seasonal	
Italy	Catania	Catania–Fontanarossa Airport	Seasonal	
Italy	Milan	Milan Malpensa Airport		
Italy	Naples	Naples International Airport	Seasonal	
Italy	Olbia	Olbia Costa Smeralda Airport	Seasonal	
Italy	Palermo	Falcone Borsellino Airport	Seasonal	
Italy	Pisa	Pisa International Airport	Seasonal	
Italy	Rome	Leonardo da Vinci–Fiumicino Airport		
Italy	Treviso	Treviso Airport	Terminated	
Italy	Turin	Turin Airport	Terminated	
Italy	Venice	Venice Marco Polo Airport	Seasonal	
Italy	Verona	Verona Villafranca Airport	Seasonal	
Jordan	Amman	Queen Alia International Airport	Terminated	
Jordan	Aqaba	King Hussein International Airport	Terminated	
Kosovo	Pristina	Pristina International Airport		
Latvia	Riga	Riga International Airport		
Lebanon	Beirut	Beirut–Rafic Hariri International Airport	Seasonal	
Lithuania	Kaunas	Kaunas Airport		
Lithuania	Palanga	Palanga International Airport		
Lithuania	Vilnius	Vilnius Čiurlionis International Airport		
Malta	Luqa	Malta International Airport	Seasonal	
Martinique	Fort-de-France	Martinique Aimé Césaire International Airport	Terminated	
Montenegro	Tivat	Tivat Airport	Seasonal	
Morocco	Agadir	Agadir–Al Massira Airport	Terminated	
Morocco	Marrakech	Marrakesh Menara Airport	Terminated	
Netherlands	Amsterdam	Amsterdam Airport Schiphol		
North Macedonia	Skopje	Skopje International Airport	Seasonal	
Norway	Ålesund	Ålesund Airport, Vigra		
Norway	Alta	Alta Airport		
Norway	Andenes	Andøya Airport, Andenes		
Norway	Bardufoss	Bardufoss Airport		
Norway	Bergen	Bergen Airport, Flesland	Base	
Norway	Bodø	Bodø Airport		
Norway	Harstad/Narvik	Harstad/Narvik Airport, Evenes		
Norway	Haugesund	Haugesund Airport, Karmøy		
Norway	Kirkenes	Kirkenes Airport, Høybuktmoen		
Norway	Kristiansand	Kristiansand Airport, Kjevik		
Norway	Kristiansund	Kristiansund Airport, Kvernberget	Terminated	
Norway	Lakselv	Lakselv Airport, Banak		
Norway	Longyearbyen	Longyearbyen Airport, Longyear		
Norway	Molde	Molde Airport		
Norway	Moss	Moss Airport, Rygge	Terminated	
Norway	Oslo	Oslo Airport, Gardermoen	Base	
Norway	Sandefjord	Sandefjord Airport, Torp		
Norway	Stavanger	Stavanger Airport	Base	
Norway	Tromsø	Tromsø Airport		
Norway	Trondheim	Trondheim Airport		
Poland	Gdańsk	Gdańsk Lech Wałęsa Airport		
Poland	Kraków	Kraków John Paul II International Airport		
Poland	Poznań	Poznań–Ławica Airport		
Poland	Szczecin	Solidarity Szczecin–Goleniów Airport		
Poland	Warsaw	Warsaw Chopin Airport		
Poland	Wrocław	Wrocław Airport	Seasonal	
Portugal	Faro	Faro Airport		
Portugal	Funchal	Madeira Airport	Terminated	
Portugal	Lisbon	Lisbon Airport	Seasonal	
Portugal	Ponta Delgada	João Paulo II Airport	Terminated	
Portugal	Porto	Porto Airport	Seasonal	
Puerto Rico	San Juan	Luis Muñoz Marín International Airport	Terminated	
Romania	Bucharest	Henri Coandă International Airport	Seasonal	
Russia	Moscow	Moscow Domodedovo Airport	Terminated	
Russia	Saint Petersburg	Pulkovo Airport	Terminated	
Serbia	Belgrade	Belgrade Nikola Tesla Airport		
Singapore	Singapore	Changi Airport	Terminated	
Slovakia	Bratislava	Bratislava Airport	Terminated	
Spain	Alicante	Alicante–Elche Airport	Base	
Spain	Barcelona	Josep Tarradellas Barcelona–El Prat Airport		
Spain	Bilbao	Bilbao Airport		
Spain	Fuerteventura	Fuerteventura Airport	Terminated	
Spain	Ibiza	Ibiza Airport	Terminated	
Spain	Lanzarote	Lanzarote Airport	Terminated	
Spain	Las Palmas	Gran Canaria Airport		
Spain	Madrid	Madrid–Barajas Airport		
Spain	Málaga	Málaga Airport	Base	
Spain	Menorca	Menorca Airport	Terminated	
Spain	Murcia	Murcia–San Javier Airport	Terminated	
Spain	Murcia	Región de Murcia International Airport	Seasonal	
Spain	Palma de Mallorca	Palma de Mallorca Airport		
Spain	Tenerife	Tenerife South Airport	Seasonal	
Spain	Valencia	Valencia Airport	Seasonal	
Sweden	Åre	Åre Östersund Airport	Terminated	
Sweden	Gothenburg	Göteborg Landvetter Airport		
Sweden	Karlstad	Karlstad Airport	Terminated	
Sweden	Kiruna	Kiruna Airport		
Sweden	Luleå	Luleå Airport		
Sweden	Malmö	Malmö Airport		
Sweden	Stockholm	Stockholm Arlanda Airport	Base	
Sweden	Stockholm	Stockholm Skavsta Airport		
Sweden	Umeå	Umeå Airport		
Sweden	Växjö	Växjö-Kronoberg Airport		
Sweden	Visby	Visby Airport	Seasonal	
Switzerland	Geneva	Geneva Airport		
Switzerland; France Germany	Basel; Mulhouse; Freiburg	EuroAirport Basel Mulhouse Freiburg		
Thailand	Bangkok	Suvarnabhumi Airport	Terminated	
Thailand	Krabi	Krabi International Airport	Terminated	
Turkey	Alanya	Gazipaşa-Alanya Airport	Seasonal	
Turkey	Antalya	Antalya Airport		
Turkey	Bodrum	Milas-Bodrum Airport		
Turkey	Dalaman	Dalaman Airport	Terminated	
Turkey	Istanbul	Istanbul Airport		
Turkey	Istanbul	Istanbul Sabiha Gökçen International Airport	Terminated	
United Arab Emirates	Dubai	Dubai International Airport	Terminated	
United Arab Emirates	Dubai	Al Maktoum International Airport	Seasonal	
Ukraine	Kyiv	Boryspil International Airport	Terminated	
United Kingdom	Belfast	Belfast International Airport	Terminated	
United Kingdom	Birmingham	Birmingham Airport	Terminated	
United Kingdom	Cardiff	Cardiff Airport	Terminated	
United Kingdom	Edinburgh	Edinburgh Airport		
United Kingdom	Glasgow	Glasgow Airport	Begins 11 December 2026	
United Kingdom	London	Gatwick Airport		
United Kingdom	London	London Stansted Airport	Terminated	
United Kingdom	Manchester	Manchester Airport		
United Kingdom	Newcastle upon Tyne	Newcastle International Airport	Seasonal	
United States	Austin	Austin–Bergstrom International Airport	Terminated	
United States	Baltimore	Baltimore–Washington International Airport	Terminated	
United States	Boston	Logan International Airport	Terminated	
United States	Chicago	O'Hare International Airport	Terminated	
United States	Denver	Denver International Airport	Terminated	
United States	Fort Lauderdale	Fort Lauderdale–Hollywood International Airport	Terminated	
United States	Hartford	Bradley International Airport	Terminated	
United States	Las Vegas	Harry Reid International Airport	Terminated	
United States	Los Angeles	Los Angeles International Airport	Terminated	
United States	Miami	Miami International Airport	Terminated	
United States	Newark	Newark Liberty International Airport	Terminated	
United States	Newburgh	Stewart International Airport	Terminated	
United States	New York City	John F. Kennedy International Airport	Terminated	
United States	Oakland	Oakland International Airport	Terminated	
United States	Orlando	Orlando International Airport	Terminated	
United States	Providence	T. F. Green Airport	Terminated	
United States	San Francisco	San Francisco International Airport	Terminated	
United States	Seattle	Seattle–Tacoma International Airport	Terminated	
United States	Tampa	Tampa International Airport	Terminated	
United States Virgin Islands	Saint Croix	Henry E. Rohlsen Airport	Terminated	
