= Norwegian Air Shuttle =

Low-cost airline of Norway

Norwegian Air Shuttle ASA

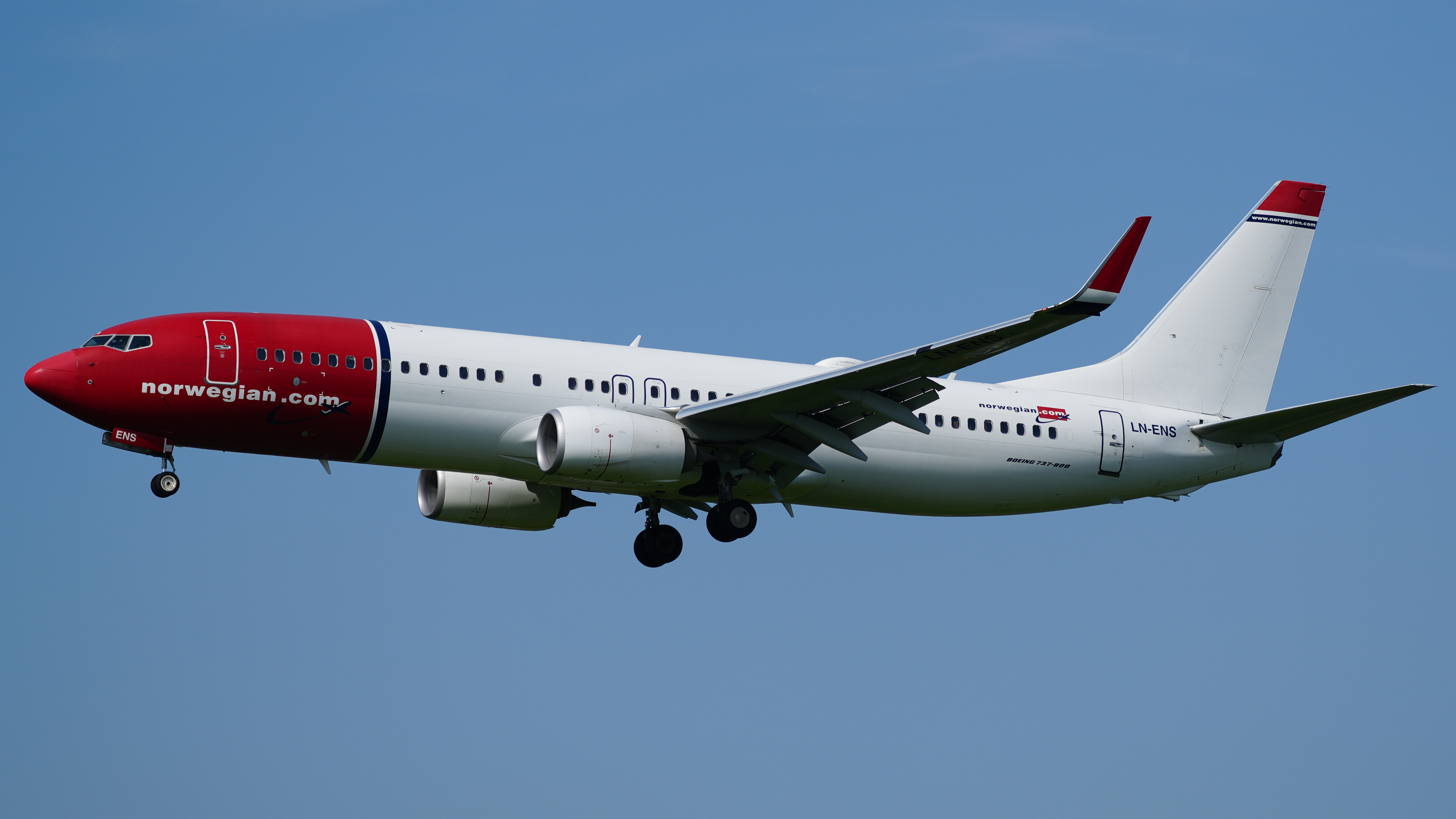
IATA	ICAO	Call sign
DY	NOZ	NORDIC
- Founded: 22 January 1993; 33 years ago
- AOC #: NO.AOC.090
- Operating bases: Alicante; Barcelona (seasonal base); Bergen; Copenhagen; Helsinki; Las Palmas; Málaga; Oslo; Palma de Mallorca (seasonal base); Riga; Stockholm–Arlanda
- Frequent-flyer program: Norwegian Reward
- Subsidiaries: Norwegian Air Sweden; Widerøe
- Fleet size: 94 (including subsidiaries)
- Destinations: 105
- Traded as: OSE: NAS
- Headquarters: "Diamanten"; Fornebu, Norway
- Key people: Geir Karlsen (CEO); Svein Harald Øygard (Chairman)
- Revenue: $1.96 billion (2022)
- Operating income: $156 million (2022)
- Net income: $105 million (2022)
- Total assets: $2.36 billion (2022)
- Total equity: $437 million (2022)
- Website: www.norwegian.com

Norwegian Air Shuttle ASA, trading as Norwegian, is a Norwegian low-cost airline and Scandinavia's second-largest airline, behind Scandinavian Airlines. It is the fourth largest low-cost carrier in Europe behind Wizz Air, easyJet and Ryanair; the largest airline in Norway; and the ninth largest airline in Europe in terms of passenger numbers. It offers a high-frequency domestic flight schedule within Scandinavia and Finland, and to business destinations such as London, as well as to holiday destinations in the Mediterranean and the Canary Islands, transporting over 30 million people in 2016. The airline is known for its distinctive livery of white with a red nose, with portraits of high achievers or famous figures on the tail fins of its aircraft.

Norwegian's flights are operated by itself and Norwegian Air Sweden, a fully owned subsidiary. Each airline holds a unique air operator's certificate (AOC) but shares branding, corporate identity, and commercial functions.

Until December 2019, Norwegian also owned and operated Norwegian Air Argentina, which operated domestic flights within that country.

Until January 2021, Norwegian's former long-haul subsidiaries, Norwegian Air UK and Norwegian Long Haul, operated long-haul flights on behalf of the company, after which both subsidiaries were put into liquidation when long-haul operations were ended due to the COVID-19 pandemic. Until April 2021, Norwegian utilised Ireland-based Norwegian Air International for European-based operations outside of Norway or Sweden.

On 18 December 2023, Norwegian Air Norway returned its sole aircraft to parent Norwegian Air Shuttle.

== History ==
=== 1993–2001: Beginnings as a regional airline ===
Norwegian Air Shuttle (NAS) was founded on 22 January 1993 to take over the regional airline services produced by Busy Bee for Braathens in Western Norway. Busy Bee, founded in 1966, was a subsidiary of Braathens that operated a fleet of Fokker 50 aircraft on charter services. This included the network of regional services between cities on the west coast of Norway operated on wet lease for the mother company. Following Busy Bee's bankruptcy in December 1992, NAS took over three leased Fokker 50 aircraft, and started operating from Bergen Airport, Flesland to Haugesund Airport, Karmøy, as well as from Bergen to Molde Airport, Årø or Kristiansund Airport, Kvernberget, and onwards to Trondheim Airport, Værnes. The company was established and owned by former Busy Bee employees and initially had a workforce of fifty. It was based in Bergen, but later established a technical base in Stavanger.

From 1 April 1994, the airline also began service from Bergen to Ålesund Airport, Vigra. In 1995, the company received its fourth Fokker 50s, and had a revenue of NOK 86.6 million and a profit of NOK 2.9 million. It flew 50 daily services.

By 1999, the company had six Fokker 50s and flew 500,000 passengers on 20,000 flights. The company had a revenue of NOK 172 million and a profit of NOK 13 million. On 2 June 2000, NAS bought the helicopter operator Lufttransport from Helikopter Service. In 2000, the NAS fleet was expanded to seven Fokker 50s. From 2 January 2001, several Braathens routes were terminated, including the NAS-operated services from Kristiansund to Trondheim and Molde. The route from Bergen to Haugesund, and Bergen–Molde–Trondheim were reduced.

=== 2002–2009: Emergence as a low-cost carrier ===
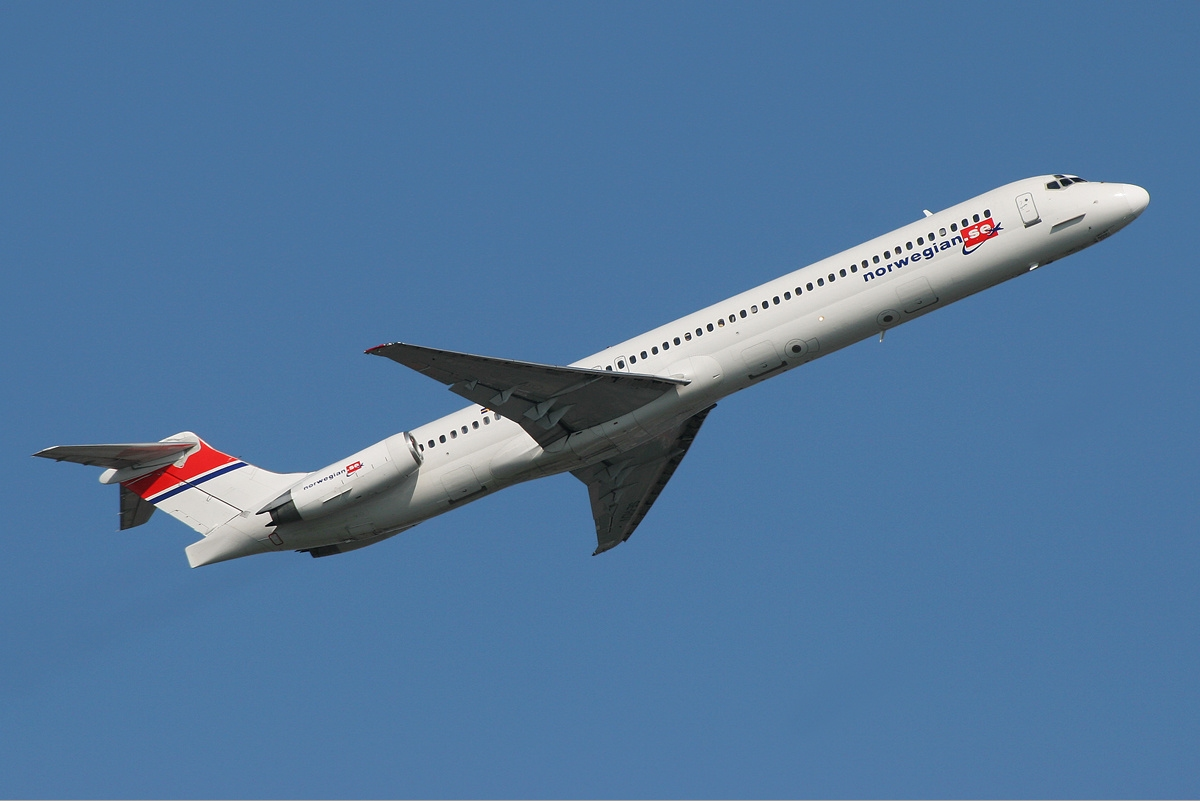
Norwegian previously operated seven second-hand McDonnell Douglas MD-80 series (MD-82 and MD-83) aircraft.

On 7 January 2002, NAS took over the route from Stavanger to Newcastle, flying two round trips per day; this was the first route on which the airline did not wet lease the aircraft to Braathens, but operated the route in its own right. After Braathens was bought by Scandinavian Airlines System (SAS) in November 2001, all contracts that Norwegian had with Braathens for the routes on the Norwegian west coast were cancelled by SAS, as it wanted its subsidiary SAS Commuter to take the routes over. NAS had an 18-month cancellation period in its contract with Braathens; however, this was not respected by SAS - the contracts were terminated without notice. Following the purchase of Braathens by SAS, and the subsequent termination of its contracts, NAS announced in April 2002 that it would start domestic scheduled services as a low-cost carrier on the busiest routes. From 1 September 2002, the airline re-branded as Norwegian.

The airline opened its second hub at Warsaw Frederic Chopin Airport in Poland, flying to Central European destinations. There were two Boeing 737 operating from Warsaw. (The base was closed in 2010.) Norwegian announced on 24 April 2007 that it had bought 100% of the Swedish low-cost airline FlyNordic from Finnair plc, becoming the largest low-cost airline in Scandinavia. As payment for the shares in FlyNordic, Finnair received a 5% share stake in Norwegian.

Norwegian's early success was based on very low cost tickets compared to tickets from other airlines in the same region e.g. SAS. The fleet consisted of rather old Boeing 737-300s, an aircraft type introduced already in 1984, which meant that Norwegian's planes were 10-20 years old. On 30 August 2007, Norwegian ordered 42 new Boeing 737-800 aircraft, with options for 42 more, an order worth US$3.1 billion. This order was later increased by six aircraft in November 2009. In July 2010 15 of the options were converted to orders, and in June 2011 15 more options were converted, bringing the total order of new, owned 737-800s to 78 aircraft with 12 remaining options. Additionally, Norwegian introduced leased Boeing 737-800 aircraft into the fleet. The first leased 737-800 arrived at Oslo Airport, Gardermoen, Norway, on 26 January 2008.

In April 2010, Norwegian started flights from Oslo-Gardermoen and Stockholm to Helsinki-Vantaa Airport. During early 2011, Norwegian had three aircraft stationed in Helsinki, and introduced domestic flights to Oulu Airport and Rovaniemi Airport on 31 March 2011. In May, flights to nine additional international destinations began.

=== 2010–2017: Rapid expansion, and long-haul operations ===
In October 2009, Norwegian had announced that it intended to start flights from Oslo to New York City and Bangkok, for which new intercontinental aircraft were required. In 2010, it said it was considering up to 15 intercontinental destinations from Scandinavia, and would also consider services to South America and Africa. On 8 November 2010, Norwegian announced that it had contracted to lease two new Boeing 787 Dreamliners with delivery in 2012; and that it was negotiating the leasing of additional aircraft.

On 25 January 2012, Norwegian announced the largest orders of aircraft in European history. The orders consisted of 22 Boeing 737-800 and 100 Boeing 737 MAX 8 aircraft with options for another 100 of the latter; and for 100 Airbus A320neos with options for another 50. In late October 2012, the airline announced a new base at London Gatwick from spring 2013 with three Boeing 737-800s to be used on new international routes from London to leisure destinations in Spain, Portugal, France, Italy and Croatia. All announced routes were to be flown in competition with airlines such as British Airways, easyJet and Thomson Airways.

In 2016, Norwegian won its first charter contract in the United States, flying three Boeing 737-800s out of Chicago/Rockford International Airport and General Mitchell International Airport in Milwaukee to Mexico and the Caribbean from December 2016 to April 2017 for Apple Vacations and Funjet Vacations.

By February 2017, Norwegian had expanded to the point that it became Scandinavia's largest airline. On 20 April 2017, Norwegian announced its second long-haul destination in Asia, with flights between London's Gatwick Airport and Singapore Changi Airport, using Boeing 787s operated by Norwegian Air UK. (These flights ended on 11 January 2019.) On 29 June 2017, Norwegian took delivery of its first Boeing 737 MAX, which featured Freddie Laker on its tailfin and was registered to Norwegian Air International. The parent company, Norwegian Air Shuttle, would later accept its first Boeing 737 MAX on 13 August 2018, the aircraft featuring Oscar Wilde on its tailfin.

=== 2018–2021: Restructuring and changes in strategy ===
To finance its aggressive growth involving the inauguration of many new routes, the hiring and training of new employees, and the accepting of aircraft deliveries, Norwegian sold some of its shares in Bank Norwegian in June and December 2017, and participated in the sale and leaseback of its owned aircraft.

Norwegian changed its strategy from growth to profitability in 2018, and in January 2019, the airline announced restructuring measures consisting of the closure of several crew bases mostly for its Boeing 737 operations outside Norway, as well as a possible revision of its aircraft order books, including the cancellation of nearly its entire Airbus A320neo family order. On 12 March 2019, the group grounded all of its Boeing 737 MAX aircraft, on the advice of the EASA, after the Ethiopian Airlines and Lion Air crashes. On 11 July 2019, the company's founder and CEO Bjørn Kjos stepped down as CEO. Kjos explained his decision by citing his age and the company's growing need for fresh leadership. Chief Financial Officer Geir Karlsen stepped in as interim CEO. In the past year of restructuring, Norwegian's stock price dropped more than 85% from the previous year, largely blamed on the Boeing 737 MAX groundings. In an effort to delay its bond repayment of $380 million by two years, Norwegian offered its slots at Gatwick for collateral. Jacob Schram, a former gas executive, was named Kjos' replacement as CEO on 20 November 2019 and joined the company in January 2020.

==== 2020: COVID-19 pandemic and seeking of government aid ====
In 2020, the COVID-19 pandemic impacted Norwegian's finances and operations, and its value on the open market dropped nearly 80% in the weeks leading up to Black Thursday. On 16 March 2020, the airline announced it was cancelling 85% of its flights and laying off 7,300 workers. On 20 April 2020, the airline reported the bankruptcy of various staffing subsidiaries and the termination of agreements with OSM Aviation, each of which were responsible for staffing the airline's flights from its crew bases outside of Norway, France, and Italy, affecting 4,700 workers.

On 27 April 2020, Norwegian outlined its plans to qualify for a governmental loan from the Norwegian state, including the conversion of its debt and leasing commitments to equity, its intention to reduce its active fleet to seven Boeing 737-800 aircraft operating solely on domestic routes within Norway, and to postpone operations outside of Norway (including to the rest of Europe and intercontinental long-haul flights) until March 2021. The airline presented these plans as creating a "New Norwegian", further planning to reinstate additional aircraft and operations as demand would allow, and to ultimately operate between 110 and 120 aircraft, down from the 160+ aircraft it operated before the crisis. Shares in the airline continued to decrease in value in anticipation of the airline converting its debt to equity, which occurred on 20 May 2020, resulting in companies leasing aircraft to the airline (including AerCap and BOC Aviation) becoming the airline's largest shareholders.

On 17 June 2020, Norwegian began adding additional flights for the month of July from Norway to Denmark and Sweden, as well as from Scandinavia to other European countries including Italy, Portugal, Spain, and the UK among others as demand recovered and countries reopened. On 29 June 2020, the airline announced it had cancelled all of its remaining orders from Boeing, consisting of 92 Boeing 737 MAXes, five Boeing 787s, and service agreements related to both aircraft types.

After receiving aid from the Norwegian government, Norwegian had also sought a credit guarantee for a loan through the Swedish government, which the government described as being eligible for airlines with a Swedish operating permit and its main operations or headquarters in Sweden through the start of 2020. The Swedish government had allocated a total of 5 billion SEK in credit guarantees for potential candidate airlines, intending the candidates to be financially viable and essential to the Swedish aviation infrastructure, and noted that it had allocated 1.5 billion SEK to Scandinavian Airlines, which is headquartered in Sweden. While Norwegian through itself and its subsidiary Norwegian Air Sweden collectively had a Swedish air operator's certificate (and through it, aircraft registered on the Swedish registry), as well as operations based in Sweden, the airline's application for a credit guarantee was denied by the Swedish government in August 2020; the government claiming that the airline had not been financially viable as of 31 December 2019, before the pandemic. Also in August 2020, Norwegian warned that the company would run out of cash by the first quarter of 2021 if it had not received further funding. In November 2020, the Norwegian government stated it would not extend further government aid to the airline, amidst fears the airline would use the funding to grow its operations that were based outside of Norway. On 18 November 2020, Norwegian sought for bankruptcy protection in Ireland, where most of its remaining fleet was held, in an attempt to restructure the organization which was expected to last five months. During part of this period, Norwegian once again reduced its network to mostly domestic operations within Norway with an active fleet of eight Boeing 737-800s.

==== 2021: Reduction of fleet and closure of long-haul operations ====
In 2021, restructuring continued in order to formulate a sustainable business plan that would allow the airline to both receive further governmental aid and investment from private enterprise. In January 2021, Norwegian and its subsidiaries began to reduce their fleets by returning several aircraft, including long-haul Boeing 787s, to their respective lessors. On 14 January 2021, Norwegian announced the end of all long-haul services to focus on a reduced European route network. On 24 February 2021, Norwegian announced that it had cancelled orders for 53 Airbus A320neos and 30 Airbus A321LRs. On 4 March 2021, CFO Geir Karlsen confirmed that the airline's Boeing 737 MAX operations would not resume and that the airline had sought to sell its 737 MAX fleet. On 11 March 2021, the Irish high court approved Norwegian's termination of a further 25 aircraft leases. Norwegian Air Shuttle filed for US Chapter 15 bankruptcy the next day, March 12. On 26 March 2021, approved its restructuring plan as part of its bankruptcy protection procedures. This was followed by the high court in Norway approving the restructuring plan on 10 April 2021.

To further simplify and streamline its operations, Norwegian retired its Irish AOC held by Norwegian Air International, and began the process of reregistering NAI's remaining Irish-registered fleet to Norway and the transferral of its EU-based flight and base operations to Norwegian Air Sweden in mid April 2021. Norwegian's plans also included the operation of 50 Boeing 737-800s during 2021 in order to operate a single fleet type, to later increase to 68 aircraft in 2022, consisting of 40 based in Norway and the remaining 28 to be based elsewhere in Europe. Despite previously stating that its Boeing 737 MAX operations would not resume and that its Airbus A320neo family orders were cancelled, its plans acknowledged the possible returns of the 737 MAX and A320neo.

In April 2021, Norwegian announced plans to lay off 85 percent of its staff based in Spain due to the closure of all Spanish bases formerly operated by the defunct Norwegian Air International, except Alicante and Málaga which would be kept by Norwegian Air Sweden. In May 2021, Norwegian exited bankruptcy protection and its Irish examinership with the completion of its restructuring, following no objections from either of the high courts based in Ireland and Norway.

=== 2021–present: Post-restructuring ===
Following Norwegian's emergence from bankruptcy protection and restructuring, the airline's board of directors fired CEO Jacob Schram, promoting CFO Geir Karlsen to CEO. During restructuring, two new operating subsidiaries, each with its own AOC, had been established: Norwegian Air Shuttle AOC AS and Norwegian Air Sweden AOC AB. This was followed by the transfer of the fleet to the new certificates. The operation of flights under the two AOCs began on 31 October 2021, using their respective ICAO airline designator codes (NOZ and NSZ) and callsigns (NORSEMAN and NORLIGHT), retiring the previous NAX/NSW codes and NOR SHUTTLE/NORDIC callsigns. Also by the end of the month, the airline agreed to lease an additional 13 Boeing 737-800s to be delivered in time for the 2022 summer season.

On 1 December 2021, the airline announced it would resume the operation of the Boeing 737 MAX 8, with two aircraft starting in 2022, after previously retiring all of its aircraft of the type during restructuring. The airline ordered a further ten Boeing 737 MAX 8s in February 2022.

In March 2022, Norwegian Air Shuttle changed its operating callsign from NORSEMAN to NORDIC (previously FlyNordic's and later Norwegian Air Sweden's original callsign), and Norwegian Air Sweden changed its callsign from NORLIGHT to REDNOSE (previously Norwegian Air UK's callsign). In May 2022, the airline announced plans to purchase 50 Boeing 737 MAX 8 aircraft. In September 2025, the airline confirmed another order for an additional 30 Boeing 737 MAX 8 aircraft.

In 2023, Norwegian announced its intent to acquire Widerøe, the largest regional carrier in Norway, for 1,125 million kr (roughly €100 million). In December, the NCA greenlighted the purchase. The acquisition was completed in January 2024.

In June 2026, Norwegian announced its intent to acquire the parent company of Sunclass Airlines, Nordic Leisure Travel Group.

== Corporate affairs ==
=== Ownership and structure ===
Shares of the parent company, Norwegian Air Shuttle ASA, are listed on Oslo Børs (Oslo Stock Exchange) with the ticker symbol NAS and are included in the benchmark index OBX, composed of the 25 most liquid shares on the Børs. Before the May 2020 recapitalization, the largest shareholder was HBK Holding AS (4.64% of shares as of 3 April 2020), whose majority owner is Bjørn Kjos, founder of the company. After the emission of new shares to its previous creditors, its largest owners were AerCap (15.9% of the capital) and BOC Aviation (12.7%).

The Norwegian Group consists of the parent company and its directly or indirectly owned subsidiaries in Denmark, Finland, Ireland, Norway, Spain, Sweden and the United Kingdom. The parent company also owns 100% of the telephone company Call Norwegian AS, and 99.9% of NAS Asset Management, which owns the 737-800 aircraft purchased from Boeing. Norwegian is also a member of Airlines for Europe.

=== Business trends ===
The key trends for the Norwegian Group over recent years are shown below (as at year ending 31 December):

	Revenue (NOK bn)	Net profit (NOK bn)	Number of employees (FTE) (Note: at year end)	Number of passengers (m)	Passenger load factor (%)	Number of aircraft	Notes/ sources
2009	7.3	0.44	1,852	10.8	78.2	46	
2010	8.5	0.18	2,211	13.0	77.4	57	
2011	10.5	0.12	2,555	15.7	79.3	62	
2012	12.8	0.47	2,890	17.7	78.5	68	
2013	15.5	0.31	3,738	20.7	78.3	85	
2014	19.5	1.0	4,314	24.0	80.9	95	
2015	22.4	0.24	4,576	25.8	86.2	99	
2016	26.0	1.1	5,796	29.3	87.7	118	
2017	30.9	−1.7	7,845	33.2	87.5	144	
2018	40.2	−1.4	10,215	37.3	85.8	165	
2019	43.5	−1.6	9,389	36.2	86.6	156	
2020	9.0	−23.0	6,365	6.8	75.2	131	
2021	5.0	1.8	3,319	6.2	72.8	51	
2022	18.8	1.0	3,871	17.8	83.1	70	
2023	25.5	2.2	4,470	20.6	84.7	87	
2024	35.3	1.9	8,700	22.6	85	86	

=== Management ===
The company is headed by CEO Geir Karlsen, Marty St. George as COO, and the board of directors is chaired by Niels Smedegaard. Bjørn Kjos, the company's founder and previously its largest shareholder, stepped down as CEO on 11 July 2019, but continued to act as an adviser. Kjos was subsequently replaced by Karlsen as acting CEO for six months, before the company appointed Jacob Schram as its CEO, who served from January 2020 until June 2021.

=== Air operator's certificates ===
Norwegian Air Shuttle and its integrated subsidiaries, which together form Norwegian Group, each hold their own air operator's certificate (AOC). Over the airline group's history, it has collectively held multiple AOCs in various countries for the operation of its flights, beginning with the acquisition of Swedish airline FlyNordic in 2008, and later setting up subsidiary airlines in Ireland, the United Kingdom, Sweden, and Argentina in order to access traffic rights and freedoms in countries beyond Norway. By 2021, the airline group had since reduced its AOCs to certificates registered in Norway and Sweden, held by Norwegian Air Shuttle and Norwegian Air Sweden, respectively.

=== Head office ===
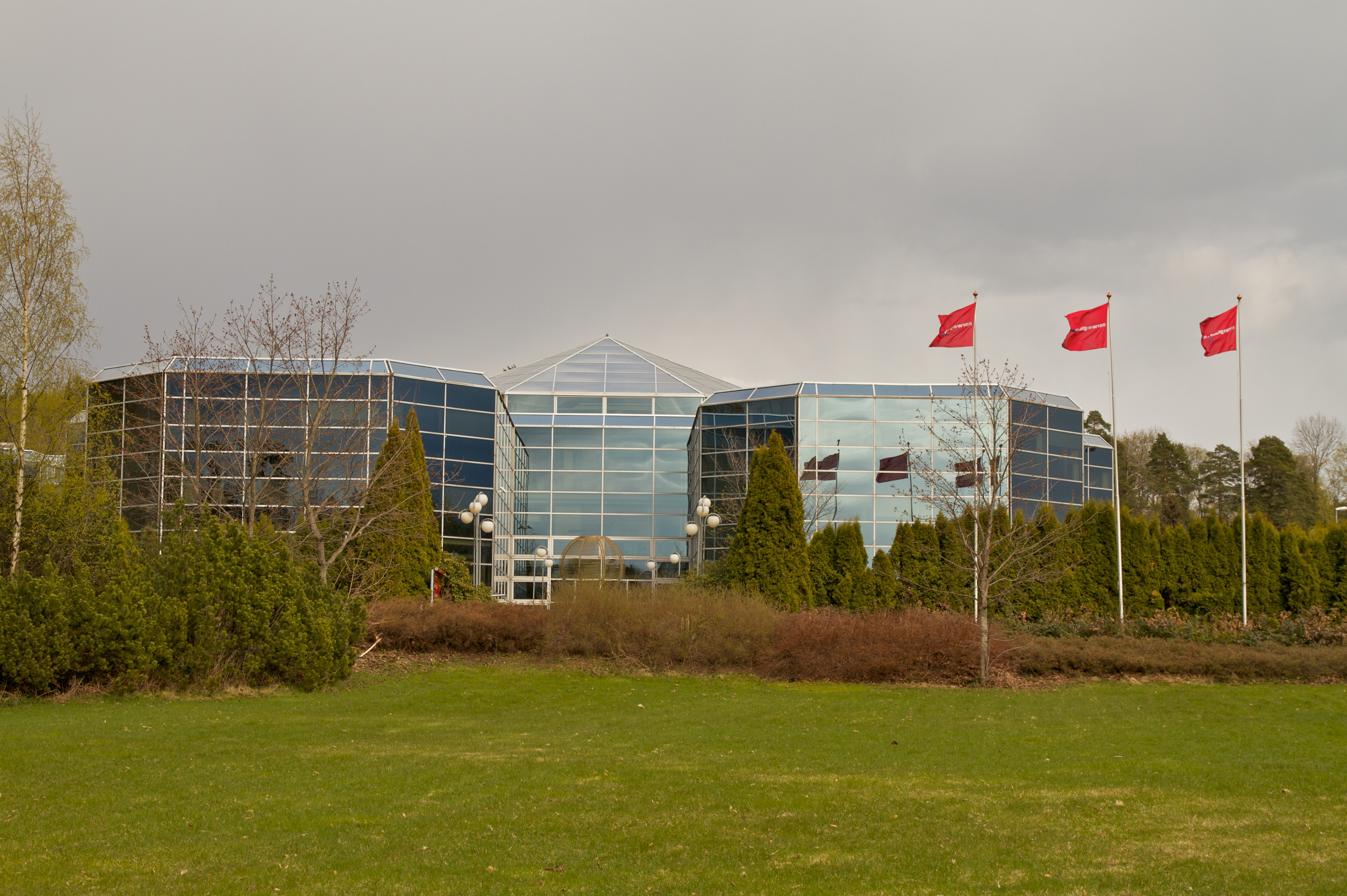
Diamanten, the headquarters of Norwegian Air Shuttle

The company's head office is in Diamanten, an office building at Fornebu, Bærum outside Oslo. Previously, the airline had its head office functions inside other buildings in Fornebu, but in 2010 moved to Diamanten, which had been the former Braathens, and later SAS Norway, head office.

== Destinations ==
Norwegian Air Shuttle serves destinations throughout Europe and North Africa for both business and leisure markets. Combined with its integrated subsidiaries that operate additional short-haul flights, the airline flies to 104 destinations as of January 2021.

Domestic, intra-Nordic and typical European business and leisure destinations have the most flights. The busiest routes in Norwegian's network are the Oslo to Bergen and the Oslo to Trondheim routes with 15 daily round-trips. Norwegian's largest non-Scandinavian operation is to London Gatwick with up to 24 daily round-trips. Intra-Scandinavian routes, and in particular on "the capital triangle" between Oslo, Stockholm and Copenhagen, are attractive due to extensive traffic for both business and leisure travellers. Other modes of transportation between these cities are generally slow.

=== Long-haul operations ===
Following Norwegian's announcement in 2009 that it would enter the long-haul market, Norwegian subsequently launched long-haul flights on 30 May 2013, which initially consisted of flights from Oslo and Stockholm to Bangkok and New York City. The flights, which were operated by a new subsidiary Norwegian Long Haul, originally launched with wet-leased Airbus A340-300 aircraft while the deliveries of the airline's Boeing 787 Dreamliner aircraft were delayed. Over the next several years, Norwegian's long-haul operations with its Boeing 787s expanded to other European countries in addition to Scandinavia, with its route network eventually consisting of flights to Asia and the Americas from Europe. A new subsidiary, Norwegian Air UK, was also established to operate long-haul flights at Norwegian's London Gatwick base.

Norwegian also launched long-haul flights using Boeing 737s between Europe and North America in 2017, initially with Boeing 737-800 aircraft before it received its first of several Boeing 737 MAX aircraft. These flights were operated by Norwegian's Irish subsidiary airline, Norwegian Air International. Long-haul operations with the Boeing 737s were ended in September 2019 following the Boeing 737 MAX groundings since March of that year, while long-haul flights with the Boeing 787s were discontinued in January 2021, following their initial suspension as an impact of the COVID-19 pandemic.

=== Interline agreements ===
- Norse Atlantic
- Widerøe

== On-time performance ==
Norwegian Air Shuttle was Europe's most on-time airline in October 2023. Cirium identified its on-time performance rate at 86.10%.

== Fleet ==
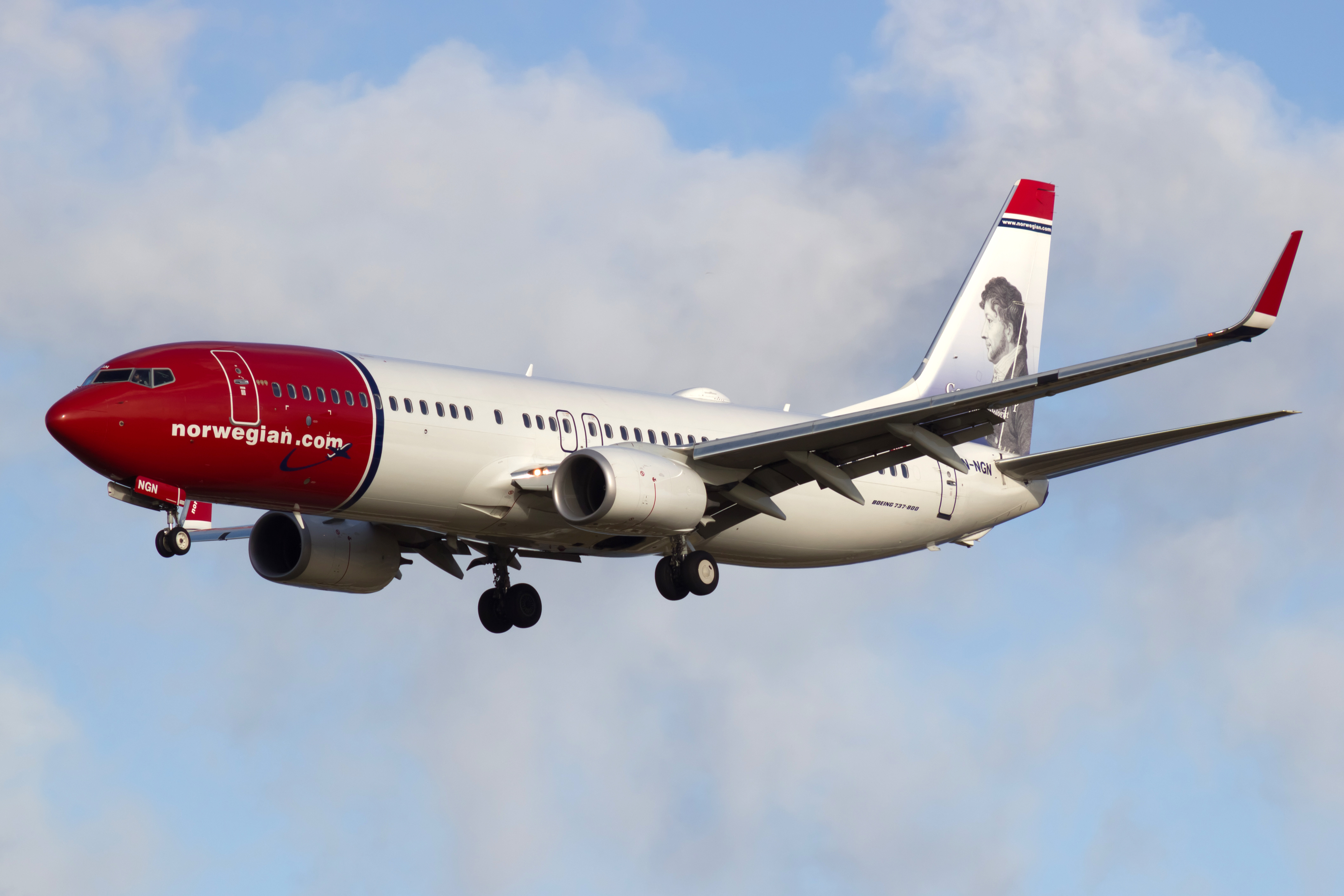
Norwegian Air Shuttle Boeing 737-800

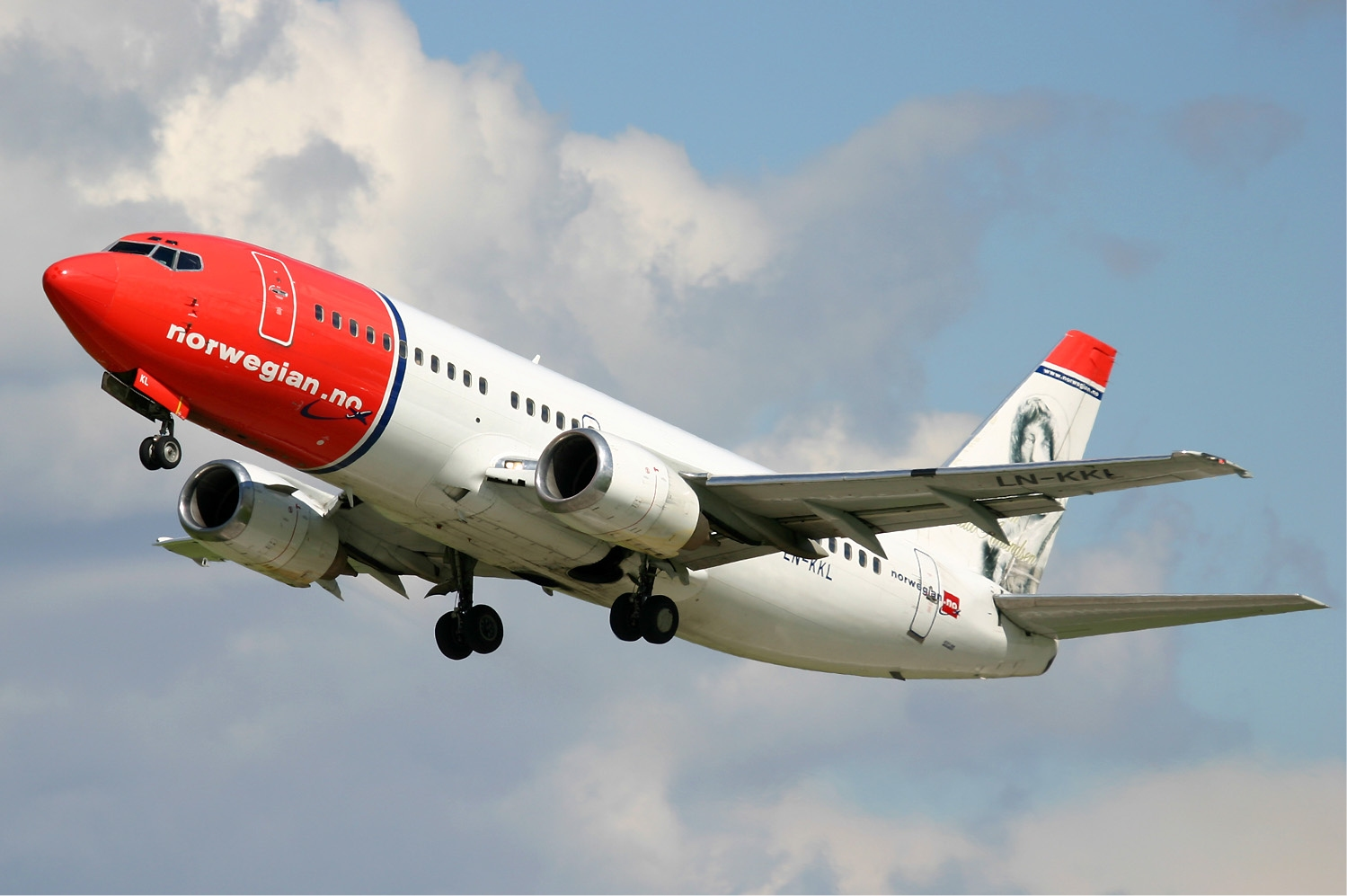
A former Norwegian Air Shuttle Boeing 737-300, phased out in 2015

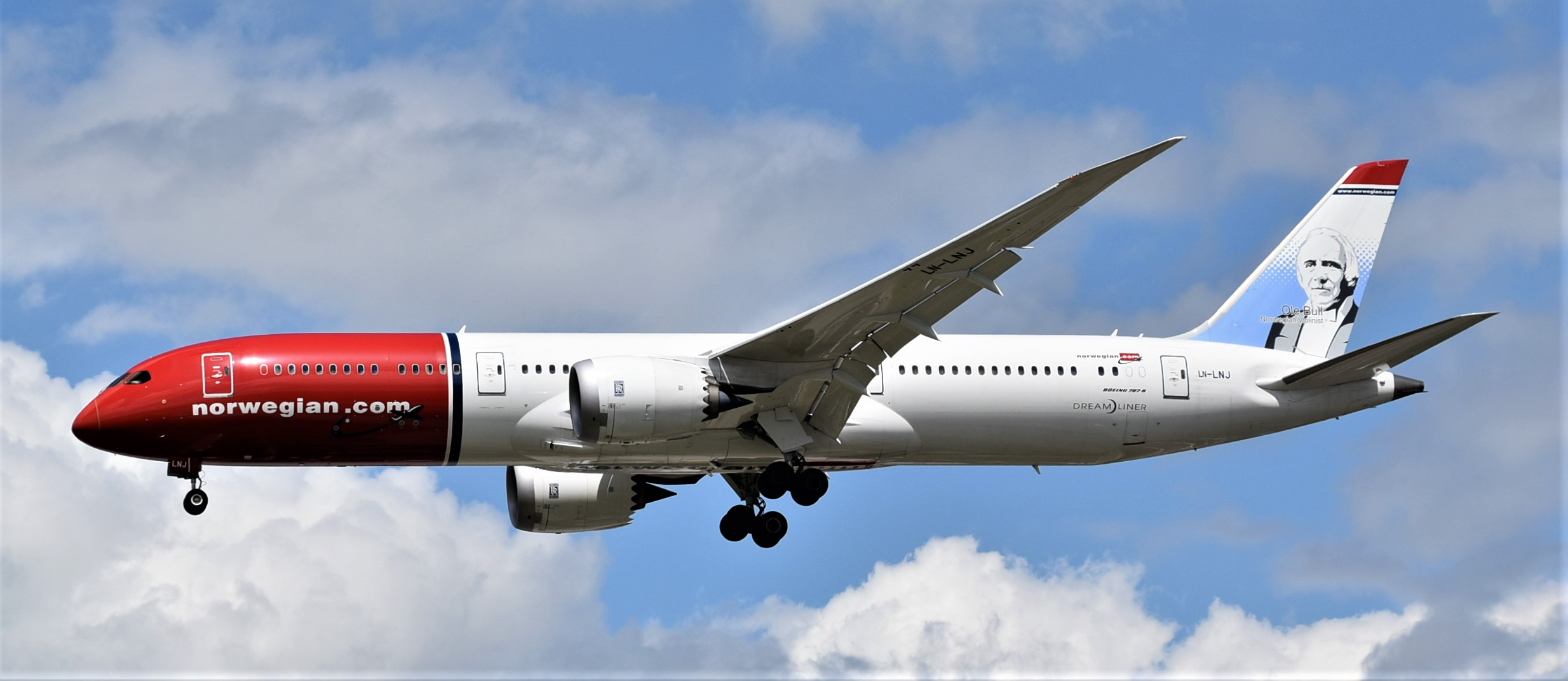
A former Norwegian Air Shuttle Boeing 787-9 operated by Norwegian Long Haul, phased out in 2021

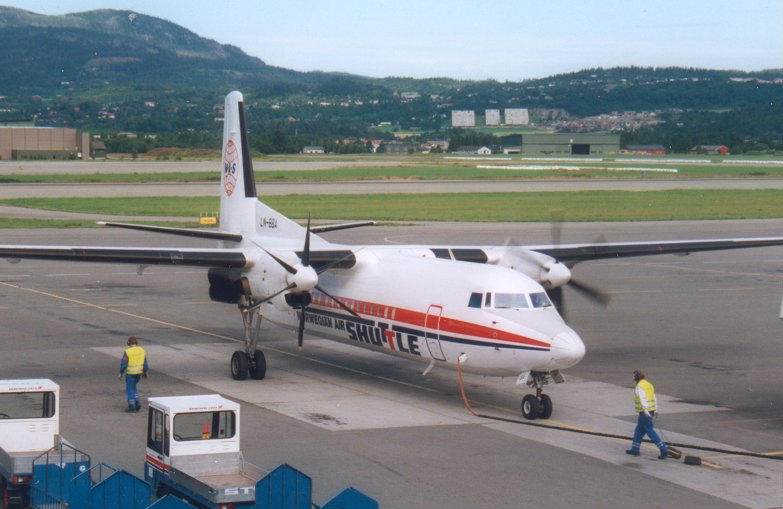
A former Norwegian Air Shuttle Fokker 50, phased out in 2004

=== Current fleet ===
As of October 2025, Norwegian Air Shuttle, including its co-branded Swedish subsidiary, operates an all-Boeing 737 fleet composed of the following aircraft:

Norwegian Air Shuttle fleet
Aircraft	In service	Orders	Passengers	Operator	Notes
Boeing 737-800	37	—	186	Norwegian Air Shuttle	Norwegian acquired 10 leased Boeing 737-800 aircraft.
Boeing 737-800	37	—	189	Norwegian Air Shuttle	Norwegian acquired 10 leased Boeing 737-800 aircraft.
Boeing 737-800	24	—	186	Norwegian Air Sweden	
Boeing 737-800	24	—	189	Norwegian Air Sweden	
Boeing 737 MAX 8	6	79	189	Norwegian Air Shuttle	Options exercised to increase order from 50 to 80.
Boeing 737 MAX 8	29	79	189	Norwegian Air Sweden	Options exercised to increase order from 50 to 80.
Total	96	79			

=== Historical fleet ===
Norwegian Air Shuttle and its integrated subsidiaries have previously operated the following aircraft:

Norwegian Air Shuttle historical fleet
Aircraft	Total	Introduced	Retired	Notes	Refs
Boeing 787-8	8	2013	2021	Operated by Norwegian Long Haul.	
Boeing 787-9	29	2016	2021	Operated by Norwegian Long Haul.	

=== Fleet development ===
From 1993 to 2002, the company solely operated Fokker 50 turbo-prop aircraft primarily as a commuter airline, having a total fleet of six by 2002. The company ceased all Fokker 50 operations at the end of 2003 to focus on Boeing 737-300 jet operations. For a limited period in the early years of the 737 operations, Norwegian operated a Boeing 737-500 as an interim solution while waiting for 737-300 deliveries. Following the acquisition of Swedish low-cost airline FlyNordic in 2007, Norwegian inherited eight McDonnell Douglas MD-80 series aircraft. The last of the MD-80 aircraft was phased out two years later.

=== Livery ===
Norwegian's aircraft livery is white with a signal red nose and a dark blue stripe, the same colours as the flag of Norway. The vertical stabilizer or tailfin is painted with a red tip and a dark blue stripe underneath containing the airline's website, with the rest of the talfin either blank white, or featuring depictions of historically significant individuals from across Europe and the Americas. Special liveries featured on Norwegian's aircraft include or previously included promotional liveries for the insurance company Silver, Norwegian's partnership with UNICEF, Network Norway, and the airline's frequent-flyer program Norwegian Reward.

== Services ==
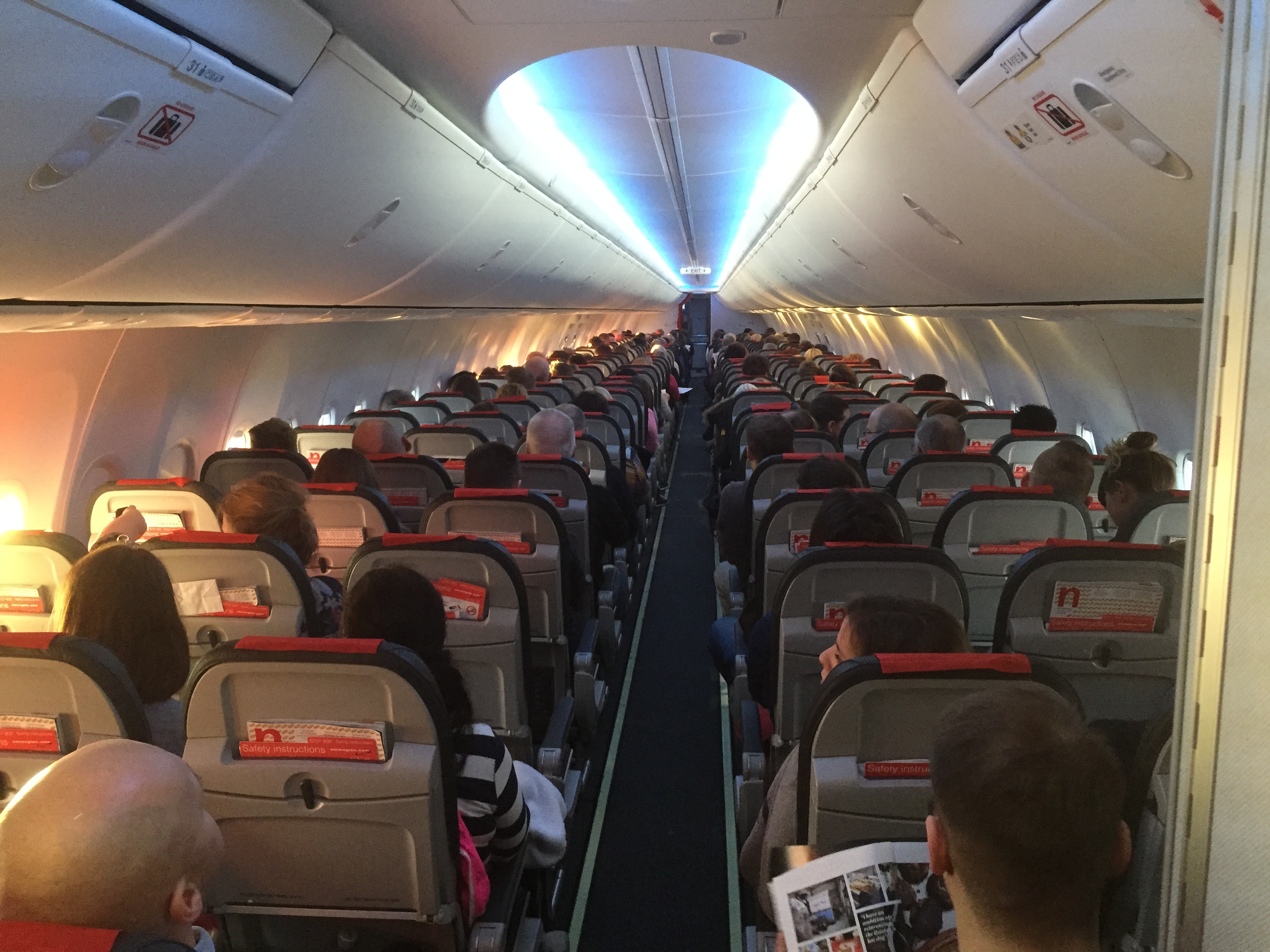
Boeing Sky interior on a Norwegian Boeing 737-800

Norwegian's Boeing 737s are configured in an all-economy class layout consisting of 186 or 189 seats in a 3–3 configuration. The airline offers in-flight entertainment by overhead screens, video on demand streamable to personal devices, and WiFi Internet access. When the airline previously operated widebody Boeing 787 aircraft through its integrated subsidiaries, it offered premium economy class seating and services. As a low-cost airline, Norwegian charges additional fees for on-board food and drinks, checked baggage, payment by credit card and other non-core services.

=== Frequent-flyer program ===
The airline runs a frequent flyer program called Norwegian Reward. Passengers can earn points based on the price of the ticket and the ticket class. Norwegian supported the ban on point accrual that was in force on domestic flights in Norway until 16 May 2013, but when that ban was lifted, the reward programs were extended to that market as well.

== Concerns and conflicts ==
=== Customer services ===
It was reported in 2014 that Norwegian Air customers had lodged a record number of complaints, with a tribunal judge stating to Dagens Næringsliv, "We have never before seen this scope of complaints in a single case". Norwegian's policies were also criticized by passengers who were left without food, drinks and blankets on board for up to 12 hours (available for payment but only with credit card). In August 2014, 35,000 people were reportedly hit with delays when flying with Norwegian, and 1,200 passengers ultimately sued Norwegian for compensation. However, for the most part, the tribunal did not agree with the complaints and only in a few cases did Norwegian have to compensate the passenger(s).

=== Labour relations ===
Between 2011 and 2013, Norwegian Air Shuttle (NAS) was criticized regarding its treatment of employees.

The media first reported NAS's announced intention to open a base in Helsinki, from where it hired pilots on short-term contracts in Estonia rather than as employees within the company. The Norwegian tax-office authorities reportedly suspected in August 2012 that many Norwegian citizens were working for NAS on these contracts and not paying Norwegian taxes, despite operating on flights originating from Norway. The Norwegian Pilot's Union (NPU) took NAS to court over the short-term contracts. Then-CEO Bjørn Kjos appeared to inflame matters when he declared that NAS would no longer hire employees on Norwegian terms.

In 2012, NAS started to use contract-employed pilots on routes within Scandinavia, considered by the NPU to be an abrogation of labor terms regarding non-Scandinavian pilots on routes within Scandinavia. The NPU soon after sued NAS.

In October 2013, the NPU announced its intention to strike because NAS had forced its pilots to face dismissal or transfer to Norwegian Air Norway or Norwegian Air Resources AB, both subsidiaries of NAS; the respective subsidiary would then hire the pilots back to NAS. The NPU and its Swedish counterpart SPF accused NAS of using this ploy to break the solidarity and organisation of the pilots, with the eventual goal of coercing pilots to convert their jobs to contract positions.

In mid December 2013, NAS demanded that its Swedish non-contract flight attendants transfer to Proffice Aviation, an external staffing company, or face dismissal. According to the Swedish cabin-crew union, Unionen, it managed to save the jobs of 53 NAS employees, but it was dissatisfied with the direction NAS had taken. The situation led to the leader for the Swedish Left Party, Jonas Sjöstedt, to state that stricter regulation was needed for the use of staffing-companies in Sweden.

=== Norwegian Long Haul ===
Norwegian Long Haul was criticized for the terms of its contracts with its long-haul flight attendants on contracts based in Thailand. The Air Line Pilots Association further accused Norwegian of unfair competition practices. The airline contested these accusations, and disclosed the pay scale for its Thai employees, who earn between $33,300 and US$39,200 per annum, which is under the $42,000 average pay of US flight attendants (though these comparisons are made between solely intercontinental Norwegian Long Haul flights versus domestic and intercontinental flights of US-paid flight attendants).

== Accidents and incidents ==
- A Norwegian Boeing 737 MAX suffered an unspecified technical failure over Iran on 14 December 2018. The pilot made a precautionary landing at Shiraz Shahid Dastgheib International Airport without incident. Spare parts required to make the aircraft airworthy were not available outside the United States, which had prohibited exports of technology to Iran. Two months later, the almost-brand-new aircraft was still stranded in Shiraz and subject to seizure by the Iranian government. On 22 February 2019, the aircraft flew from Shiraz to Stockholm after it had been stranded for 70 days.

== Norwegian's relations with the Norwegian government ==
On 12 May 2025, Norwegian government agreed to become a part-share owner of Norwegian Air Shuttle. After converting 50% of Norwegian's government loan into shares, they have owned 6.4% of the company since 12 May 2025. This comes after their agreement in 2021, under which Norwegian received government aid from Norway in 2021, and the government could convert the loan into an equal amount in shares.
