= Jacob Schram (businessman) =

Norwegian businessman

- Education: Copenhagen Business School
- Occupation: Businessman
- Known for: CEO of Norwegian Air Shuttle

Jacob Schram (born 1962) is a Norwegian executive and former CEO of Norwegian Air Shuttle, Europe's third largest low-cost airline.

== Biography ==
Before Norwegian Air Shuttle, Jacob Schram worked for McKinsey & Company and McDonald's. Then, he held executive positions at Circle K and Statoil Fuel & Retail.

Between December 2018 and December 2019, he is Advisor at Antler, a global startup generator.

Jacob Schram has a Master of Science in Strategy from Copenhagen Business School.

== Bibliography ==
- The Essence of Business, Jacob Schram, Dinamo Forlag AS, May 2017, ISBN 9788230336366

== Award ==
- NACS European Industry Leader of the Year, 2017
