= Royal Norwegian Air Force Academy =

College for the Norwegian Air Force

Coordinates: 63°25′47″N 10°26′10″E

- Motto: For Luftforsvarets fremtid
- Type: Military college
- Established: 1. October, 1949
- Location: Luftkrigsskolen, Persauneveien 61, 7045 Trondheim, Trondheim, Norway
- Website: Official website

The Royal Norwegian Air Force Academy (RNoAFA) is the Norwegian Air Force's college which conducts officer training for the RNoAF and the Norwegian Armed Forces. The school was established in 1949 and is one of the Armed Forces' three military academies. The two others are the Army Academy and the Naval Academy. The students at the Armed Forces' Academies are referred to as cadets and have full salary during education. The cadets at the RNoAFA have their own association, the Cadet Society (Kadettsamfunnet). The RNoAFA has a staff of 40 and a student body of 80 cadets and has since 1961 been located in Trondheim. The Commandant of the Royal Norwegian Air Force Academy is (from Autumn 2009) Colonel Ole Asbjørn Fauske.

== College Education ==
The undergraduate program at the RNoAFA is a 3-year Basic Officer Education (BAE). The RNoAFA has since 2005 been given status as an independent institution under the Act Relating to Universities and University Colleges. The 3-year undergraduate program leads to a bachelor's degree in military studies. Upon completion of the education at the RNoAFA, the cadets are employed as commissioned officers in the Royal Norwegian Air Force.

The RNoAFAs main goal is to educate officers in the use of air power and how to lead air operations. The core of the undergraduate program is therefore leadership and air power. These are studied from various academic approaches in a national and international context. The education is module based and is a combination of academic and military disciplines and practical exercises. The officer education is founded on the synergy between military skills, academic knowledge, physical capacity and personal development.

== Research and development ==
The RNoAFA, in addition to educating future Norwegian officers, conducts research and development (R&D). This activity is done within the main areas of air power (military theory, foreign- and security policy) and leadership. The RNoAFA has its own academic fields within these areas, and contributes with publication and lectures both nationally and internationally. The RNoAFA has a broad and close network with several institutes at the Norwegian University of Science and Technology (NTNU), and internationally within air power theory.
