= Bjørn Kjos =

Norwegian aviator, lawyer and businessman

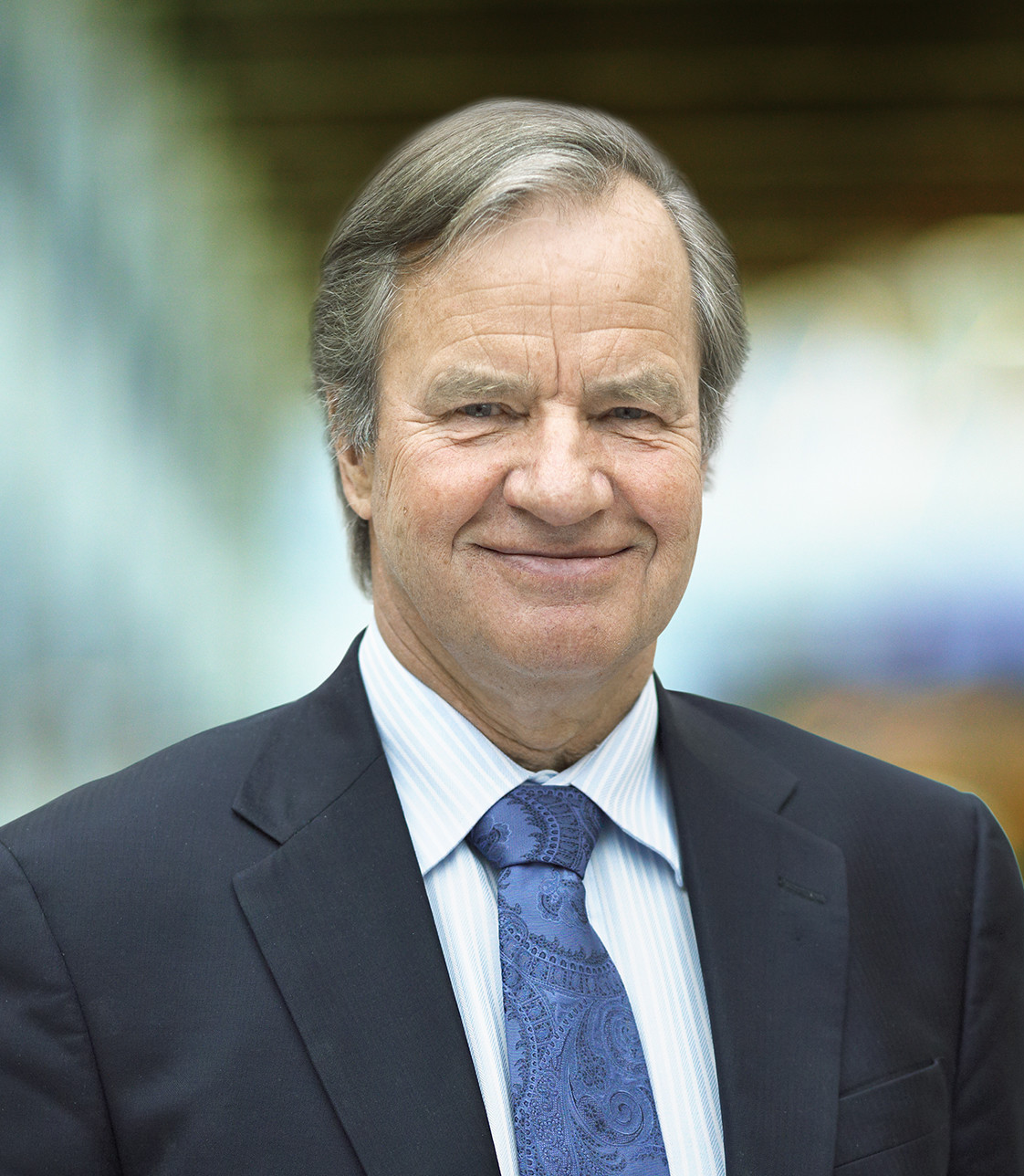
- Born: 18 July 1946 (age 80); Sokna, Buskerud, Norway
- Education: University of Oslo; Norwegian Air Force Academy
- Occupation: Advisor to Chairman
- Known for: Founding of Norwegian Air Shuttle
- Spouse: Gerd Helene Kjos
- Children: 3

Bjørn Kjos (born 18 July 1946) is a Norwegian aviator, lawyer, and business magnate. He is best known as the founder and CEO of Norwegian Air Shuttle, briefly Scandinavia's largest airline, and Europe's third largest low-cost airline.

== Early life and education ==
Kjos was born and grew up in Sokna in Ringerike. In 1953, his father Ola started the airline Norsk Skogbruksfly, and bought a Piper Cub. After serving as a paratrooper with the Norwegian Army, Kjos enrolled at the Norwegian Air Force Academy. He became a trained pilot in the Royal Norwegian Air Force during two years of training in Mississippi and Arizona in the United States, and flew Lockheed F-104 Starfighter and Northrop F-5 from 1969 to 1975. Upon returning to Norway he applied for work at the Scandinavian Airlines System. Since they did not need any new pilots, Kjos started studying law at the University of Oslo. From 1983 to 2002, he worked as a lawyer, and was also for a period a judge in Moss District Court. Since 1993 he has access to work with Supreme Court cases.

== Career ==
In 1986, Bjørn and his brother Tore started Read-gruppen, that worked with seismology in the North Sea for the oil industry. In 1993, following the bankruptcy of the airline Busy Bee, Kjos and several employees started Norwegian Air Shuttle, that used the newly available Fokker 50 aircraft to fly regional routes in Western Norway for Braathens SAFE, routes which had previously been served by Busy Bee. Kjos chaired the company from 1993 to 1996.

Kjos also owned part of Lufttransport, where he was chair until 2005, when it was sold to Norsk Helikopter. In 2002, Kjos transformed Norwegian Air Shuttle into a low-cost airline, and leased eight Boeing 737-300s. With the 2004 take-over by SAS of Braathens, Norwegian Air Shuttle quickly became Norway's second largest airline. Since Kjos took over as CEO of the regional airline in 2002, Norwegian Air Shuttle has become the second-largest airline in Scandinavia.

== Honours and awards ==
- Rockford Award Recognized for Outstanding Contribution to Regional Workforce November 2014
- Ernst & Young Entrepreneur Of The Year 2009
- Manpower Inc. "Leader of the year" 2009

== Personal life ==
Kjos is married to Gerd Helen Kjos. Together they have three adult children; son Lars Ola (b. 1978), daughters Guri Helene (b. 1980) and Anna Helene (b. 1983) the latter is also a pilot working for Norwegian. An avid outdoorsman, he enjoys hiking and sailing, and owns an apartment in Lofoten where he spends a lot of time, as well as a cabin in Hardangervidda.

In 2006, he débuted with the spy thriller The Murmansk Affair (Norwegian: Murmanskaffæren). In his public appearances, he is known to be an extremely jovial man.

In 2016 he starred as 'A legendary Aviator Man' in Ylvis' song 'Engine for Gabriel' where he advises the young group, to get the 'Rotax 914' (or similar) for Gabriel Nderitu to fulfill his dream of flying a self made aircraft.

== Wealth ==
In March 2015, Kjos debated wealth concentration with Thomas Piketty on Skavlan, a popular Norwegian-Swedish television talk show. On air, Piketty pressured Kjos to disclose his net worth after Kjos claimed that he had paid US$2m in taxes, this according to Kjos being "ten times as much tax as [he had] earned" and representing a "1,000 % tax rate". Kjos later referred to a salary of a "couple of hundred thousand dollars". Kjos was very reluctant to estimate his net worth, but the host Fredrik Skavlan suggested an amount of one to two billion, likely referring to an estimate in Norwegian kroner. At that time, Kjos held via HBK Invest 20.5% of the shares of Norwegian Air Shuttle, the company at that time having a market cap of about US$1B. In Norway, a wealth tax rate of 1.0% was levied on net assets exceeding 1,000,000 NOK as of 2014..
