= Geir Karlsen (businessman) =

Norwegian business magnate (born 1965)

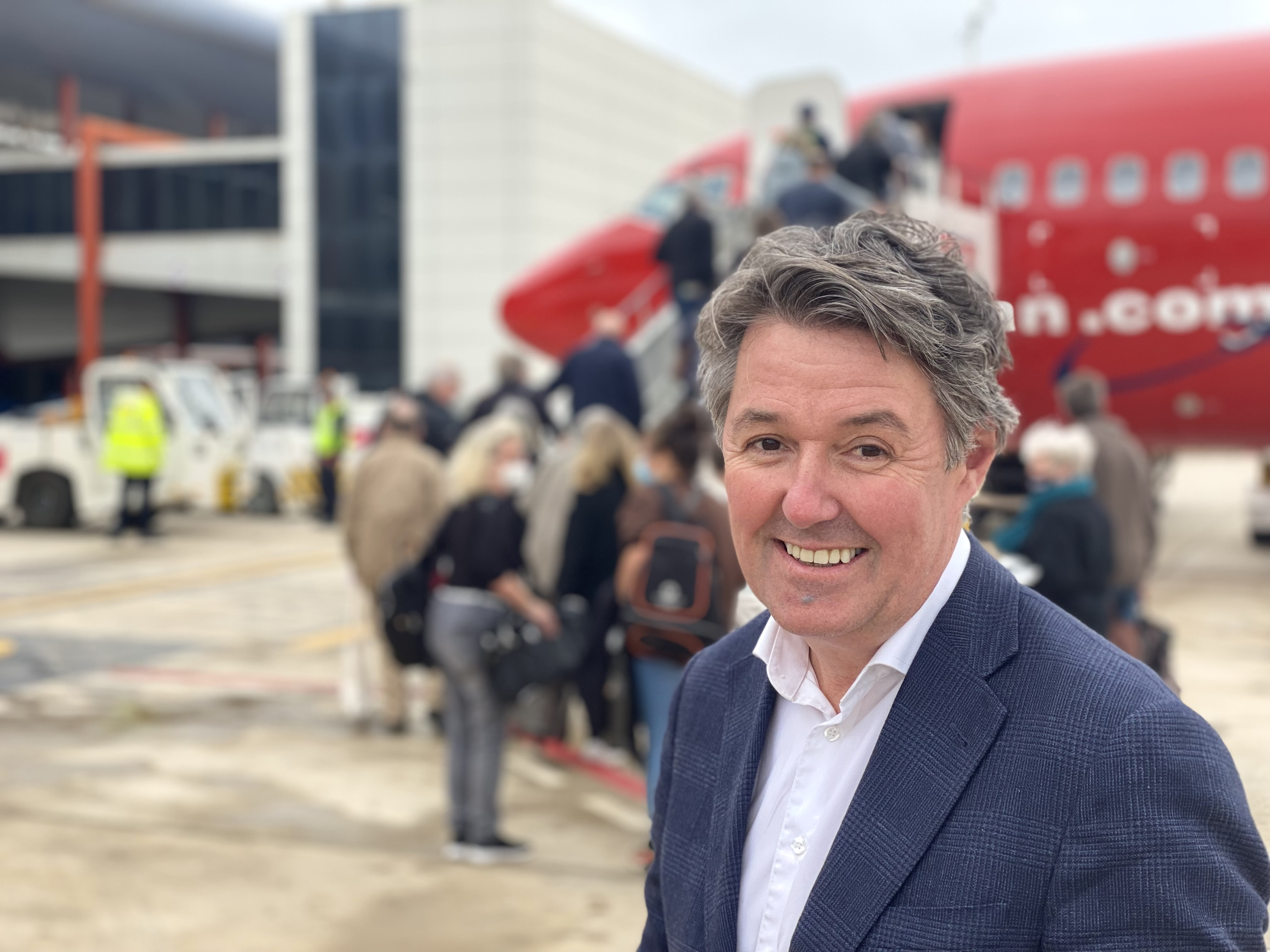
- Born: 1965 (age 60–61)
- Education: BI Norwegian Business School
- Occupation: CEO
- Known for: CEO of Norwegian Air Shuttle

Geir Karlsen (born 1965) is a Norwegian business magnate. He is best known as the CEO and former CFO of Norwegian Air Shuttle, Scandinavia's largest airline, and Europe's third largest low-cost airline.

== Biography ==
Before Norwegian Air Shuttle, Geir Karlsen worked for Golden Ocean Group and Songa Offshore. Then, he held the position Group CFO at London-based Navig8 Group.

From April 2018 to July 2019, he was chief financial officer of the Scandinavian airline.

Geir Karlsen has a degree in business administration from BI Norwegian Business School.
