= Norwegian Reward =

Frequent flyer program of Norwegian Air Shuttle

Norwegian Reward is the frequent-flyer program operated by Norwegian Air Shuttle. The program launched in 2007 and has over 10 million members (2019).

In 2017, 2018, 2019 and 2020, Norwegian Reward won the Freddie Award for 'Best Loyalty Program in Europe / Africa' in the airline category. The program also won 'Best Redemption Ability' at the Frequent Traveler Awards in 2019. In 2020, the program also won - 'Best Promotion – Europe & Africa', 'Best Customer Service – Europe & Africa' and 'Best Affinity Credit Card – Europe & Africa' at the Freddie Awards.

Each time members book travel with Norwegian or use the services of Norwegian Reward partners, CashPoints are earned. CashPoints are identical to bonus points, 1 CashPoint is equal to 1 Norwegian Krone. Points can be used to pay for tickets or related products such as seat reservations or baggage. Norwegian Reward does not work with traditional status levels, but frequent flyers can get extra benefits called 'Rewards'.

Bank Norwegian is linked to the benefits programme and with the credit card, Norwegian Card customers earn CashPoints on all their purchases. They can also earn CashPoints on purchases made in other areas such as insurance, groceries and mobile phones.
