= List of low-cost airlines =

The following is a list of low-cost airlines organised by home country. A low-cost airline or low-cost carrier (also known as a discount or budget carrier or airline) is an airline that offers generally low fares in exchange for eliminating many traditional passenger services.

== Africa ==
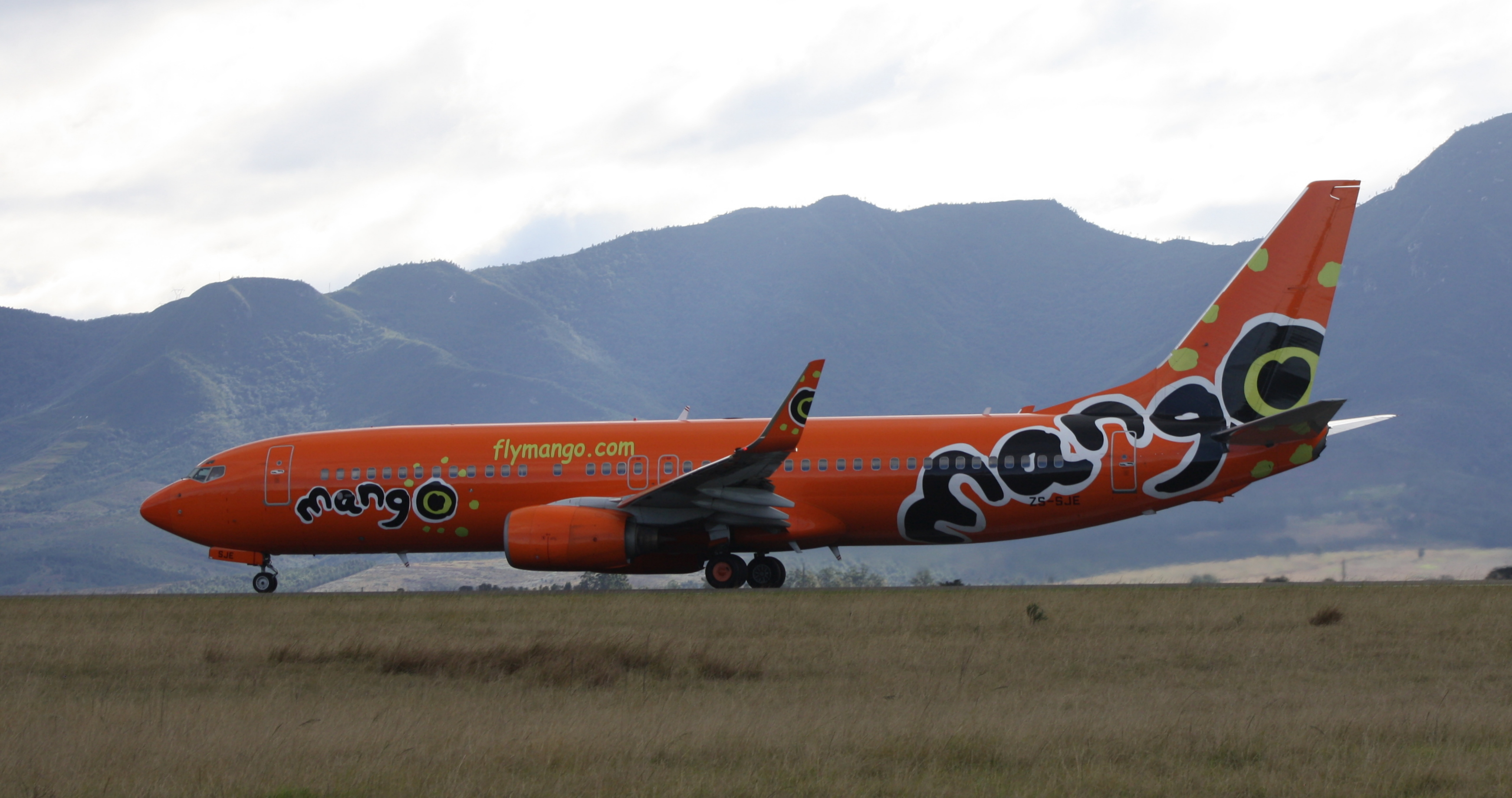
A Mango Boeing 737. The airline ceased operations in July 2021.

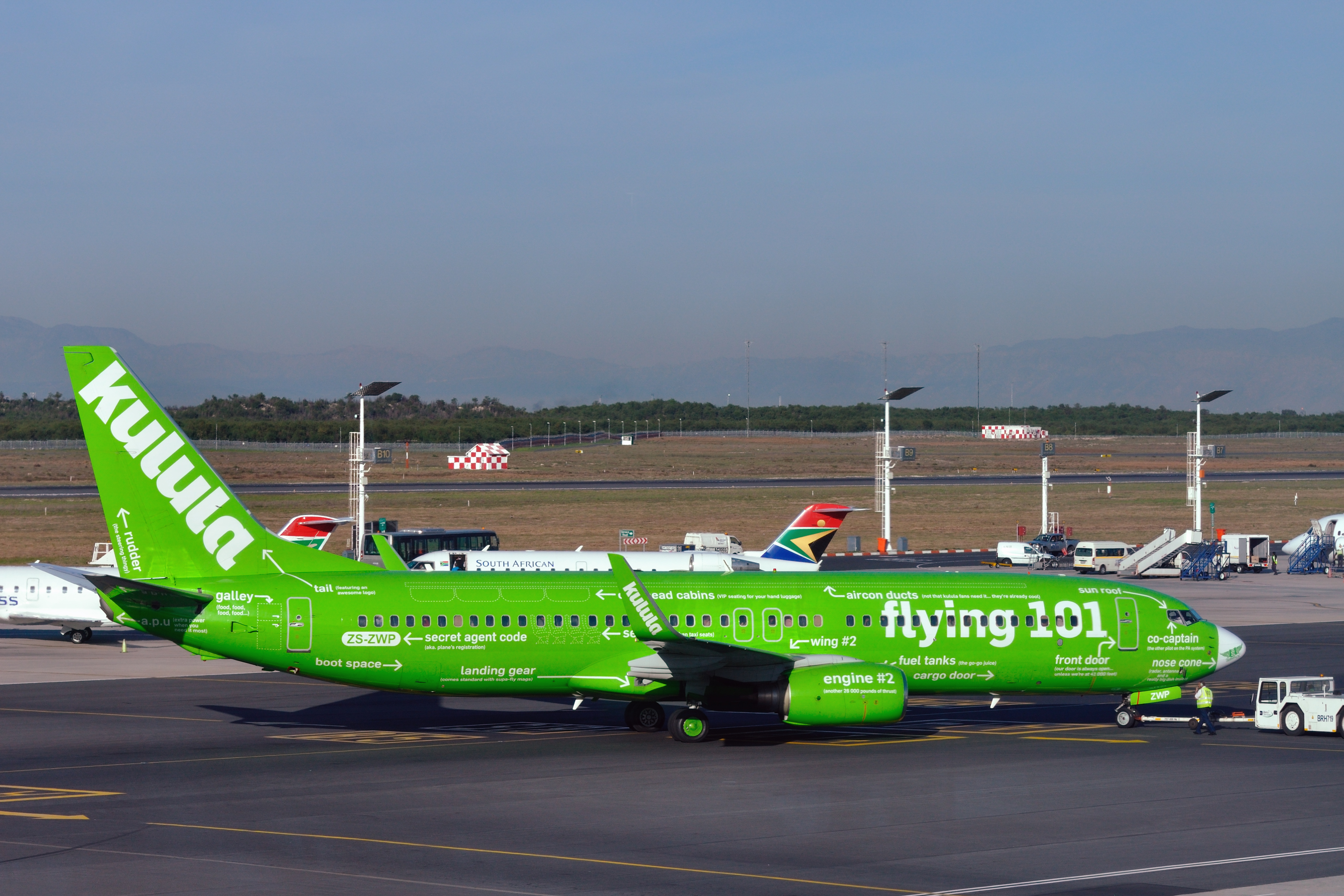
A kulula.com jet at Cape Town International Airport. The airline ceased operations in June 2022.

Egypt
- Air Arabia Egypt
- Air Cairo
Kenya
- Fly540
- Jambojet
Morocco
- Air Arabia Maroc

Nigeria
- Green Africa Airways
South Africa
- Fastjet
- FlySafair
Zimbabwe
- Fastjet Zimbabwe

== Americas ==
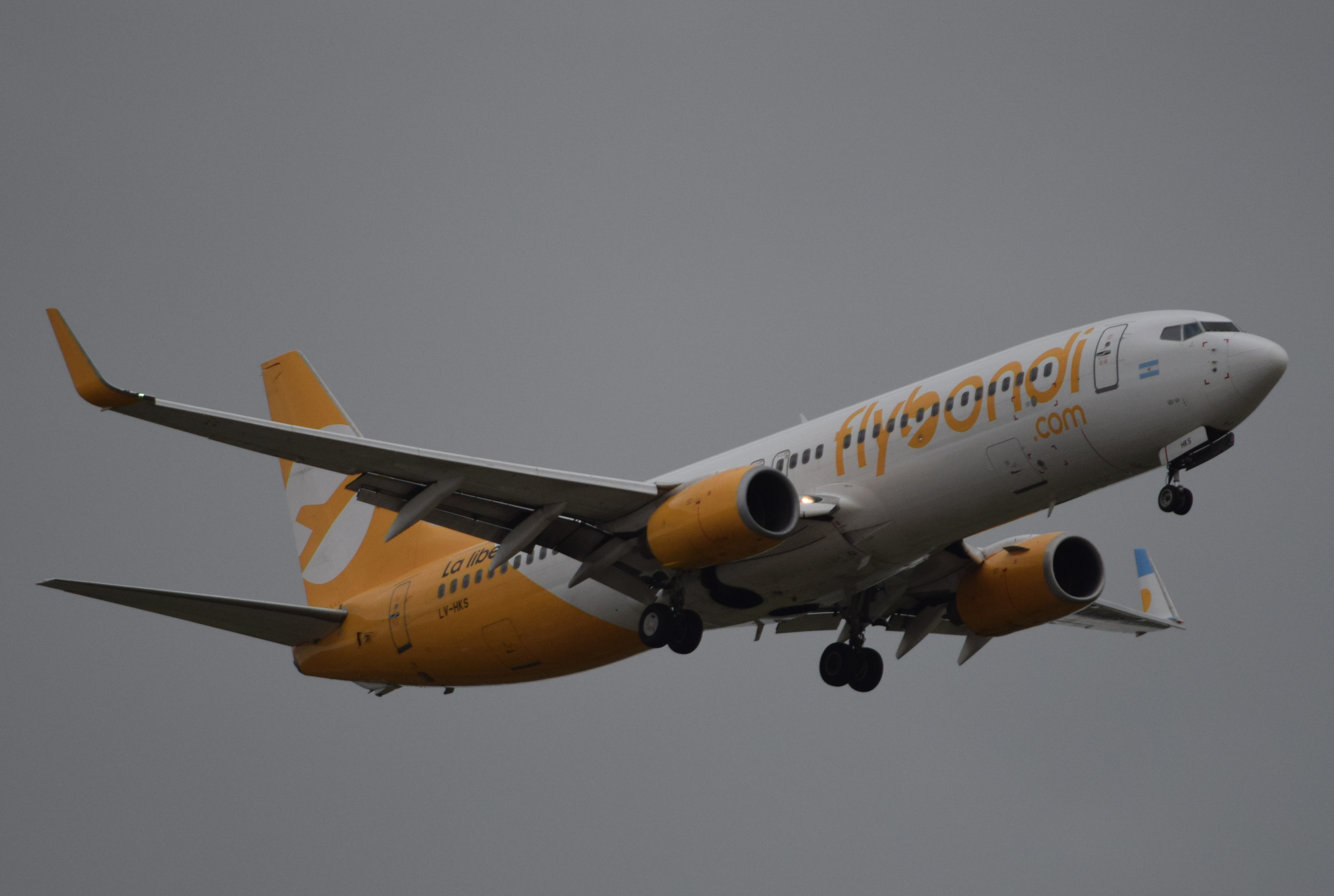
A Flybondi Boeing 737-83N

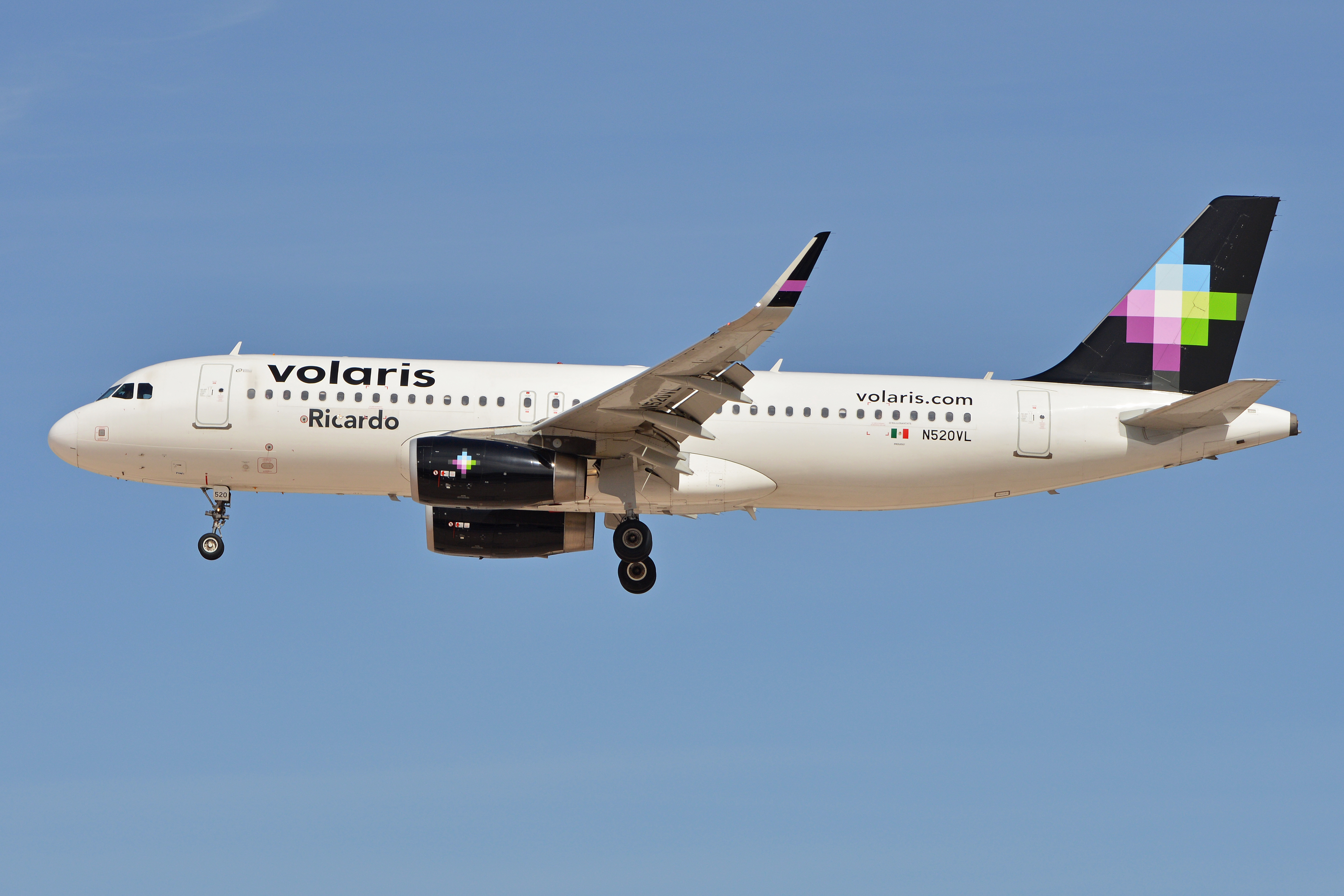
A Volaris Airbus A320-232

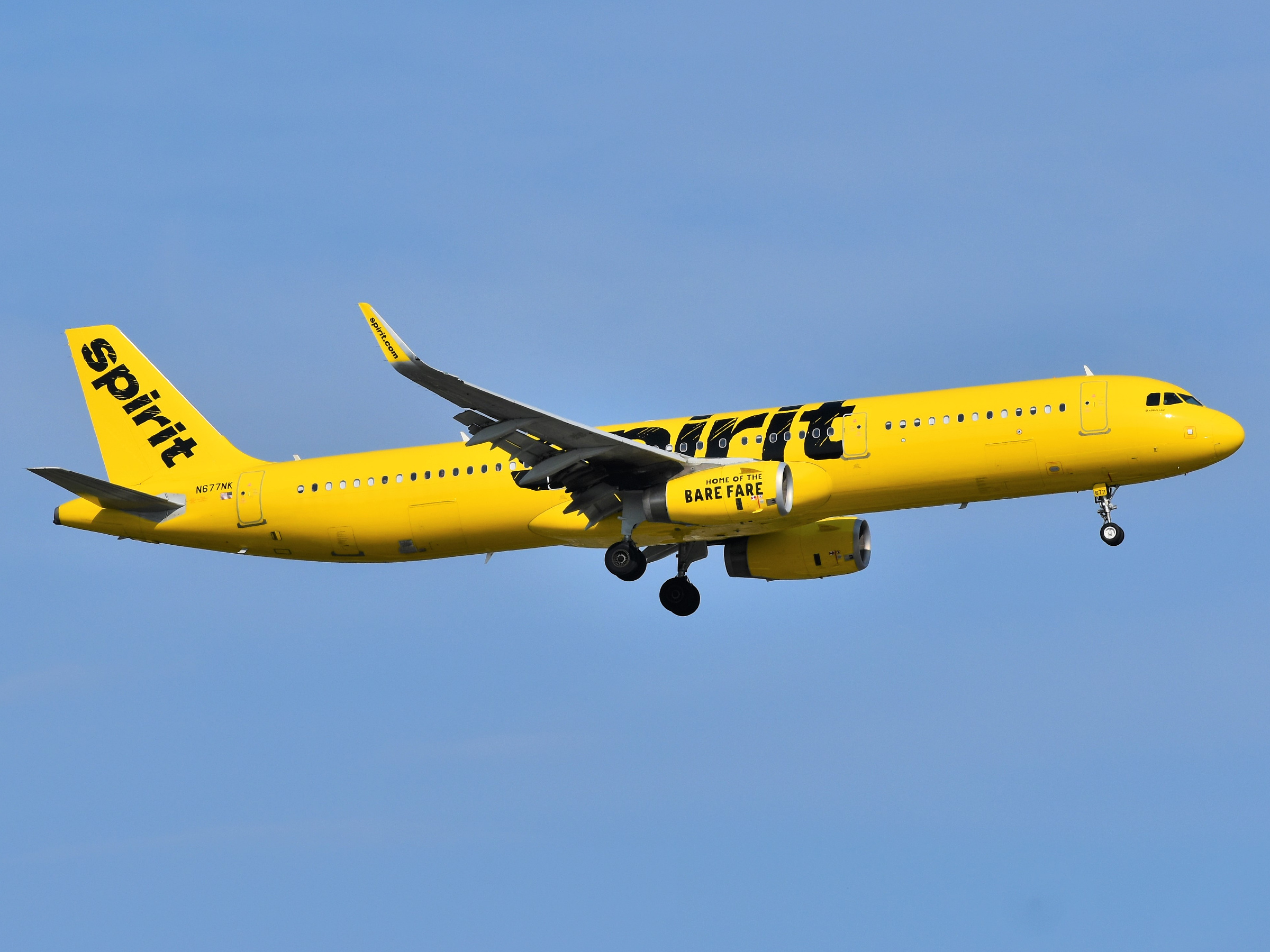
A Spirit Airlines Airbus A321 approaching Newark Liberty International Airport. The airline ceased operations on Saturday, 2 May 2026

Argentina
- Flybondi
- JetSmart Argentina
Brazil
- Gol Transportes Aéreos
- Azul Linhas Aéreas
Canada
- Air Canada Rouge
- Flair Airlines
Chile
- JetSmart
- Sky Airline
Colombia
- Clic Air
- Wingo
Costa Rica
- Volaris Costa Rica

Dominican Republic
- AraJet
- RED Air
El Salvador
- Volaris El Salvador
Mexico
- Mexicana de Aviación
- Viva
- Volaris
Panama
- Wingo Panama
Paraguay
- Paranair
Peru
- JetSmart Perú
- Sky Airline Peru
Turks and Caicos
- InterCaribbean Airways
United States
- Allegiant Air
- Avelo Airlines
- Breeze Airways
- Frontier Airlines
- JetBlue Airways
- Southwest Airlines
- Sun Country Airlines

== Asia ==
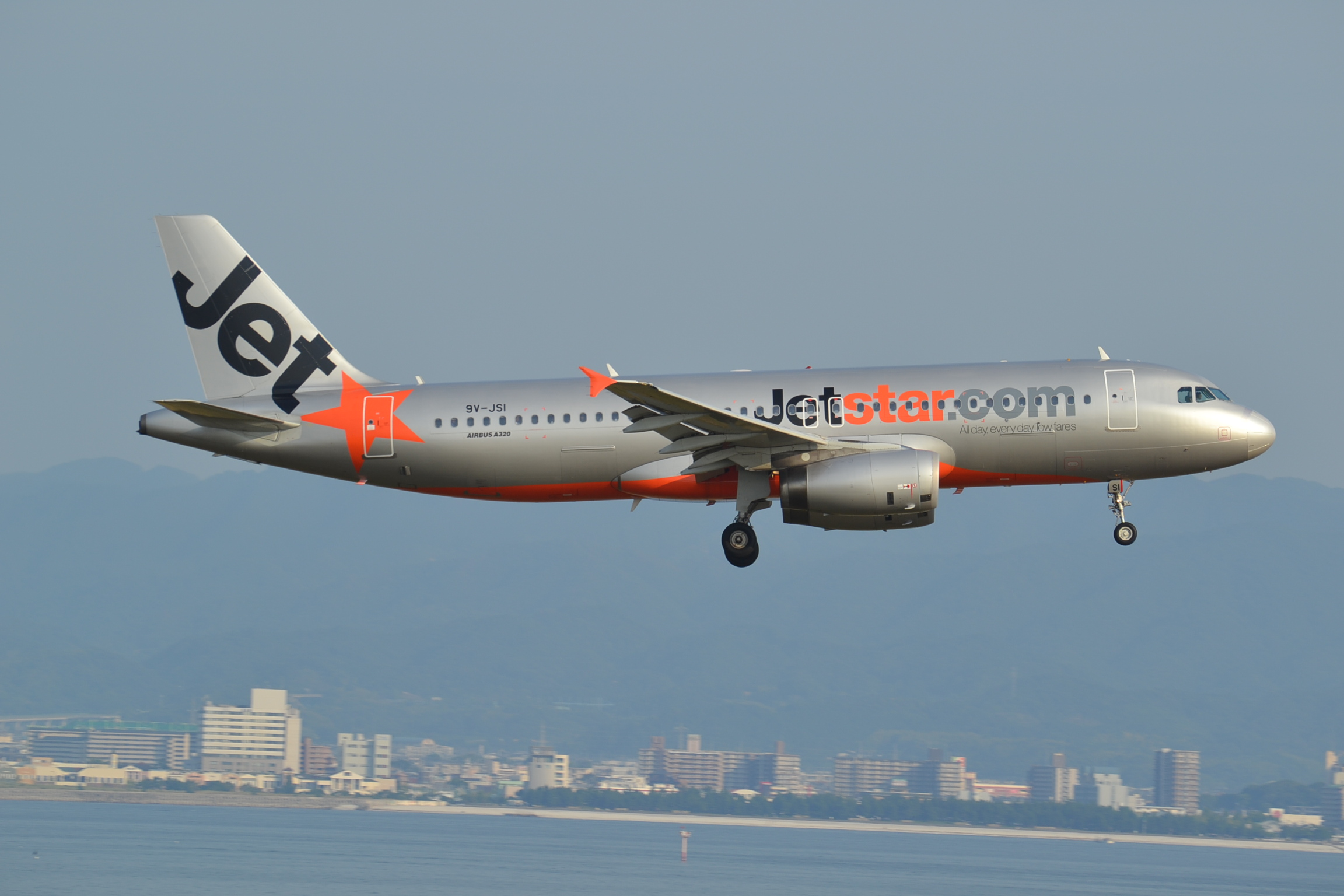
A Jetstar Asia A320 at Kansai International Airport in Osaka, Japan. The airline ceased operations on Thursday, 31 July 2025.

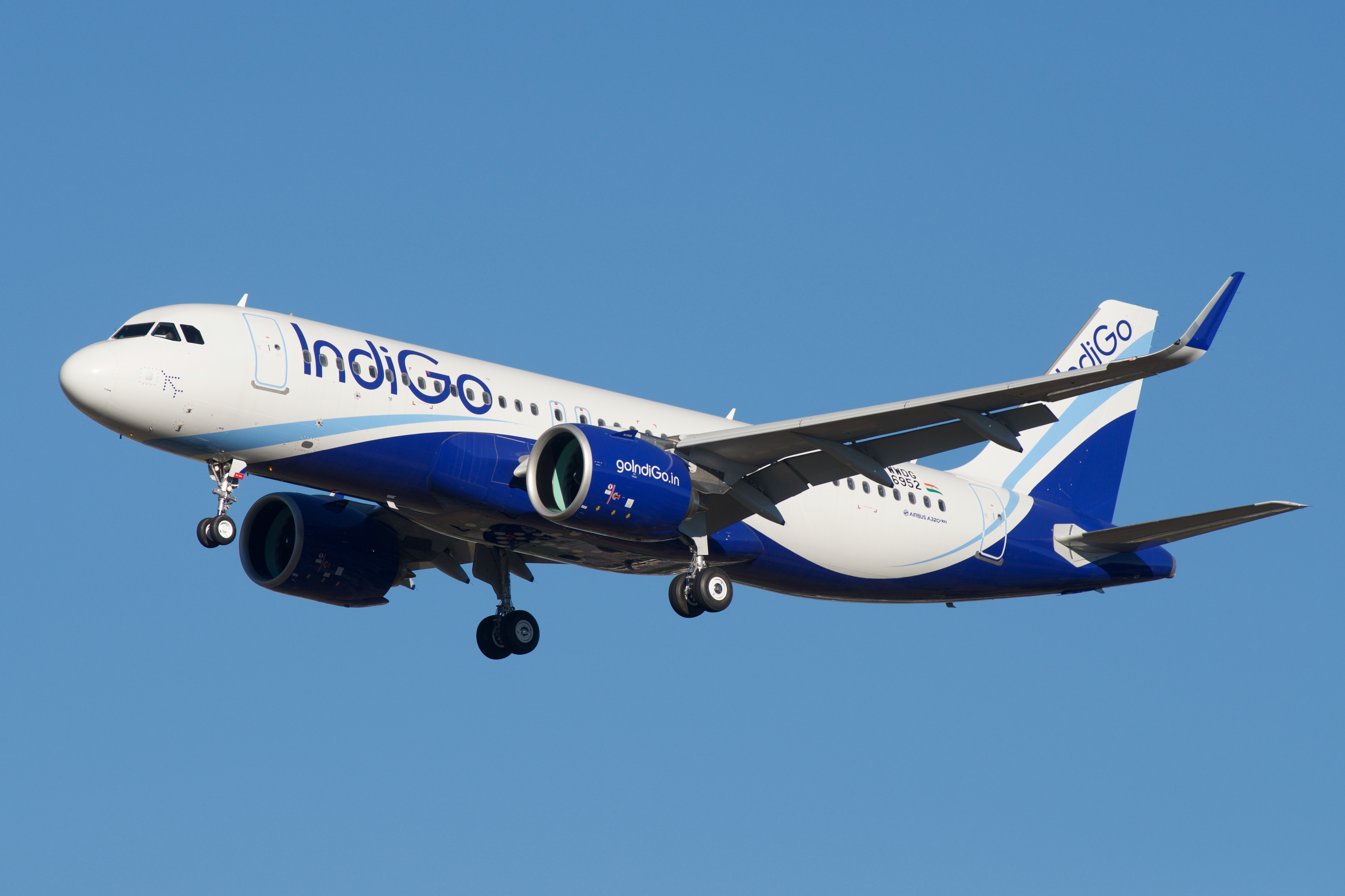
An IndiGo Airbus A320neo. The airline is the largest operator of A320neos.

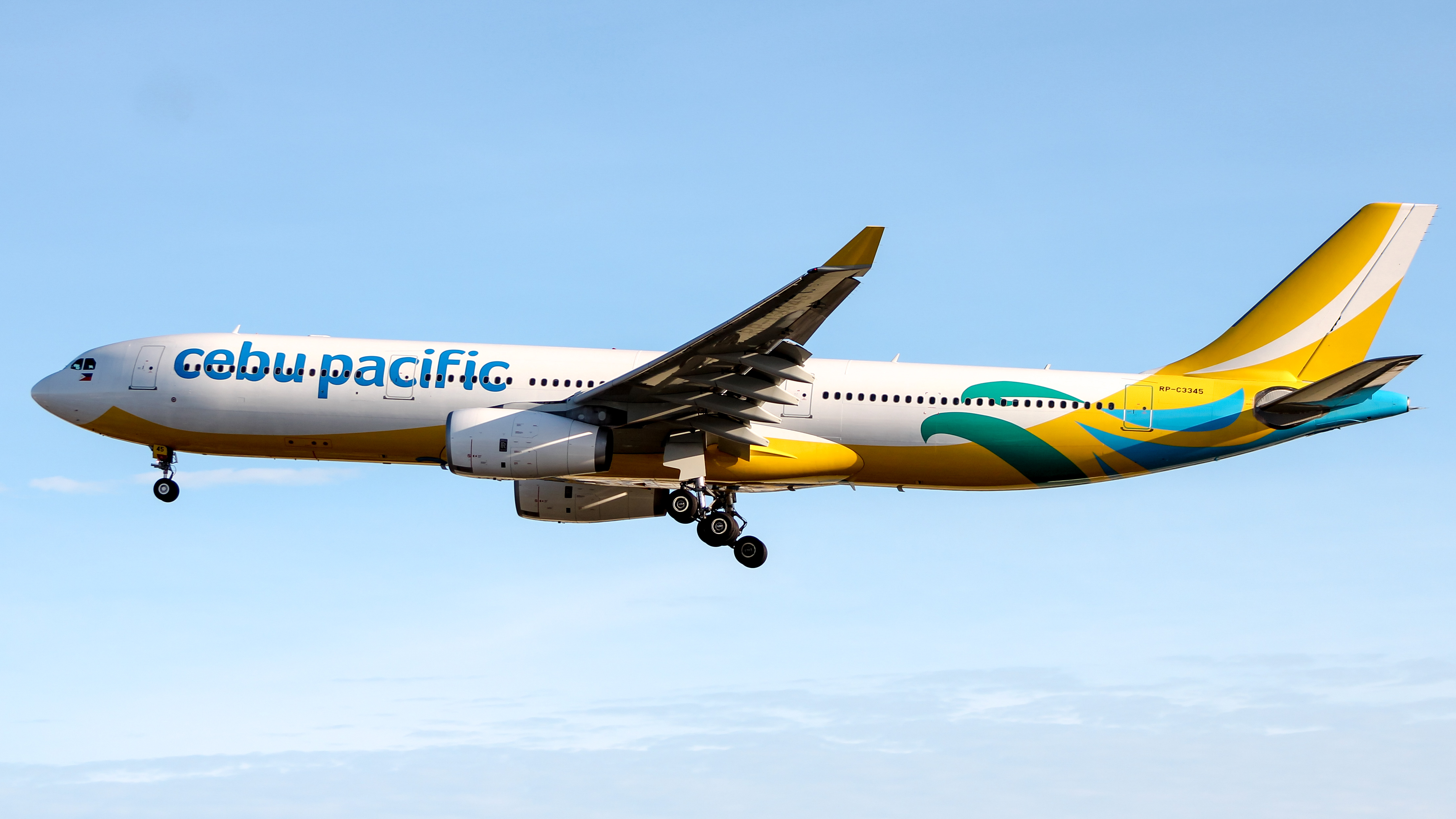
A Cebu Pacific A330-300 approaching Ninoy Aquino International Airport in Metro Manila, Philippines

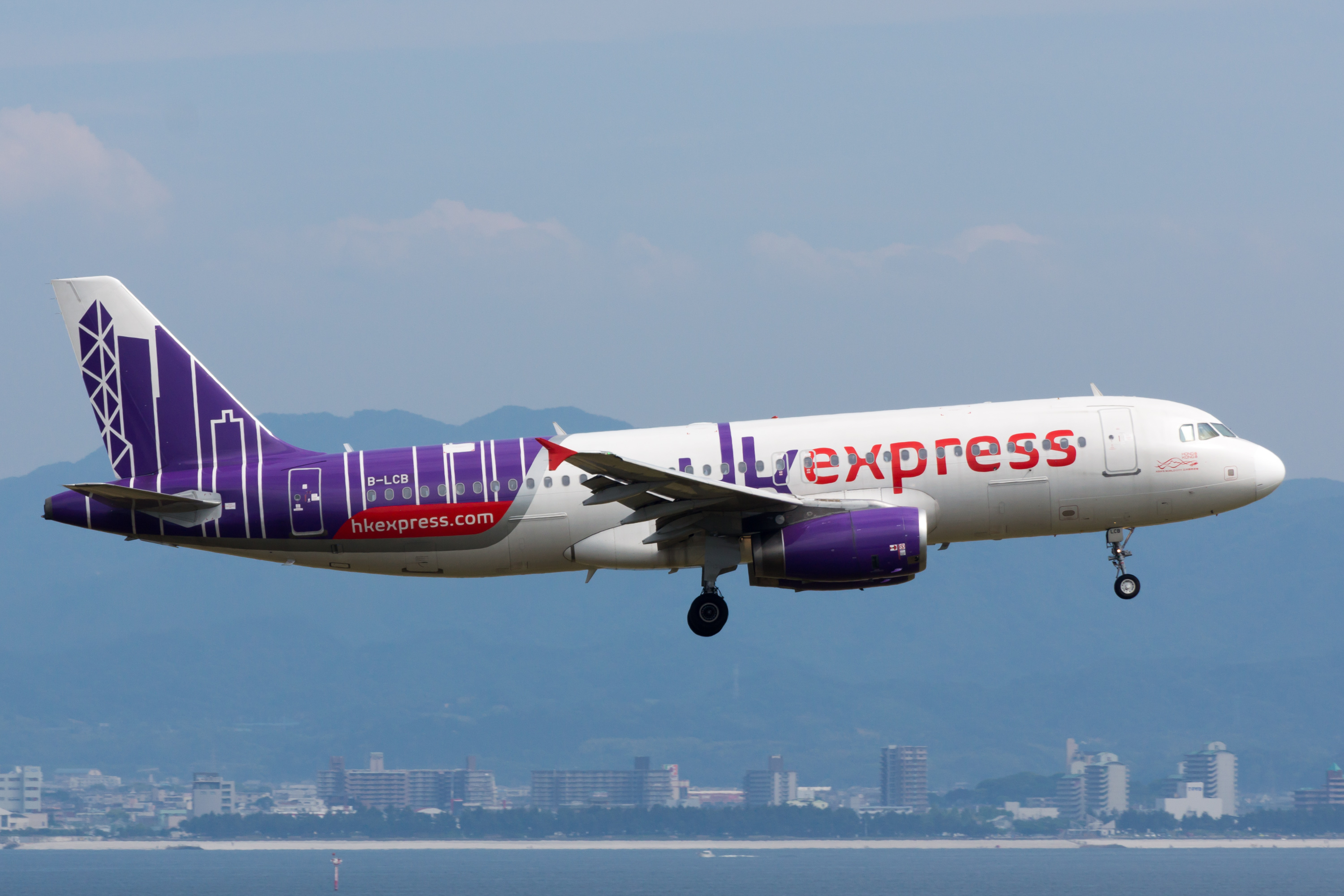
HK Express Airbus A320-200

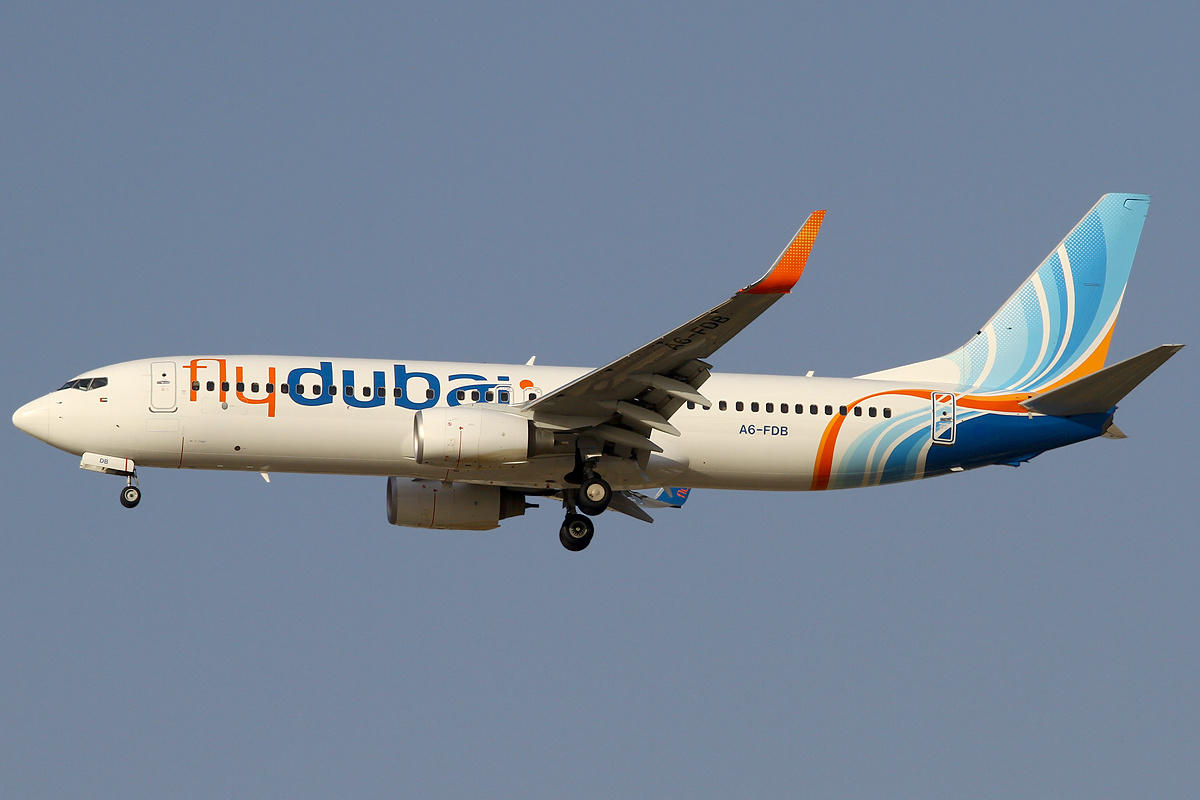
Flydubai Boeing 737-800 approaching Dubai International Airport, UAE.

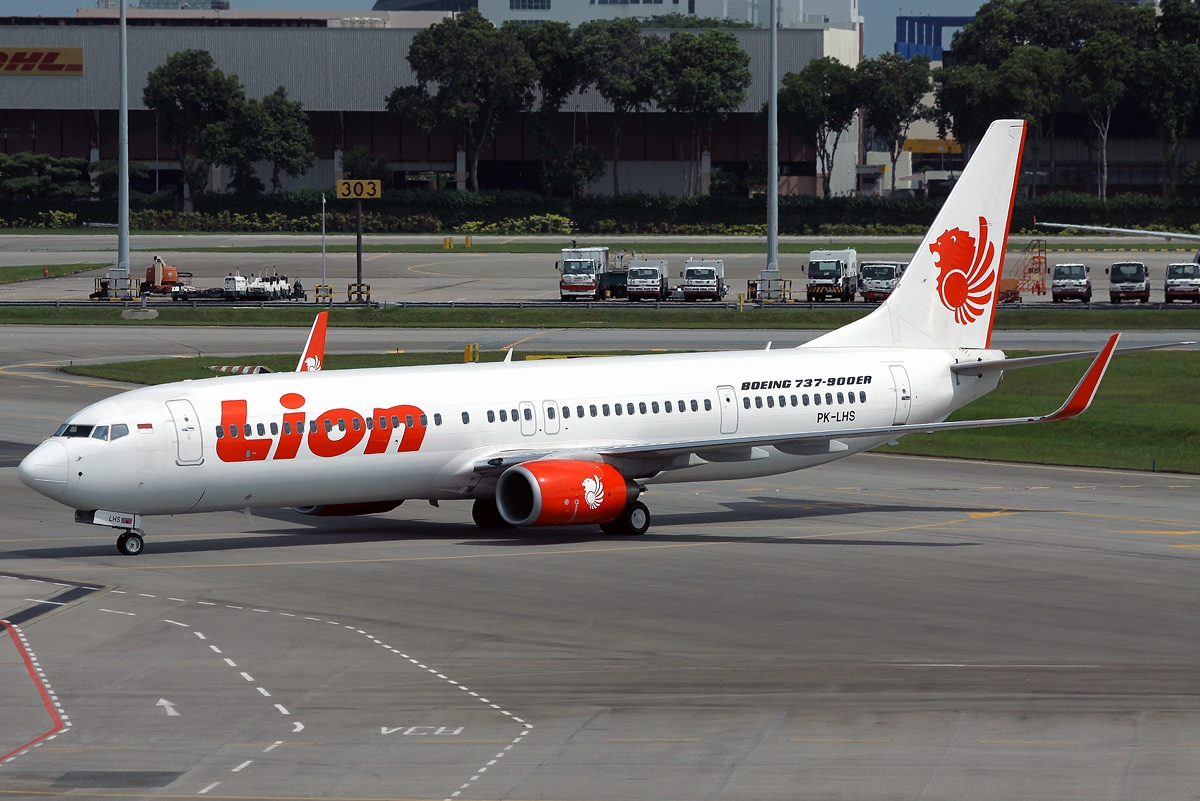
A Lion Air Boeing 737-900ER at Singapore Changi Airport. Lion Air is the largest low-cost airline in Indonesia.

Armenia
- FlyOne Armenia

Cambodia
- AirAsia Cambodia
- Cambodia Airways

China
- 9 Air
- Beijing Capital Airlines
- China United Airlines
- Colorful Guizhou Airlines
- Jiangxi Air
- Lucky Air
- Ruili Airlines
- Spring Airlines
- Urumqi Air
- West Air

Hong Kong
- Greater Bay Airlines
- HK Express

India
- Air India Express
- Akasa Air
- IndiGo
- SpiceJet

Indonesia
- Citilink
- Indonesia AirAsia
- Lion Air
- Super Air Jet
- Wings Air

Iran
- Air1Air

Japan
- Jetstar Japan
- Peach Aviation
- Spring Airlines Japan
- Zipair Tokyo

Kazakhstan
- FlyArystan
- VietJet Air Qazaqstan

Kuwait
- Jazeera Airways

Malaysia
- AirAsia
- AirAsia X
- Firefly

Oman
- SalamAir

Pakistan
- Air Sial
- Airblue
- Fly Jinnah
- Serene Air

Philippines
- Cebgo
- Cebu Pacific
- PAL Express
- Philippines AirAsia
- Royal Air Philippines
- Sky Pasada
- SkyJet Airlines

Saudi Arabia
- Air Arabia Dammam
- Flyadeal
- Flynas

Singapore
- Scoot

Sri Lanka
- FitsAir

South Korea
- Aero K
- Air Busan
- Air Premia
- Air Seoul
- Eastar Jet
- Jeju Air
- Jin Air
- Parata Air
- Trinity Airways

Taiwan
- Tigerair Taiwan

Thailand
- Nok Air
- Thai AirAsia
- Thai AirAsia X
- Thai Lion Air
- Thai Summer Airways
- Thai VietJet Air

Turkey
- AJet
- Pegasus Airlines

United Arab Emirates
- Air Arabia
- Air Arabia Abu Dhabi
- flydubai

Uzbekistan
- FlyOne Asia

Vietnam
- Pacific Airlines
- VietJet Air
- Vietravel Airlines

== Europe ==
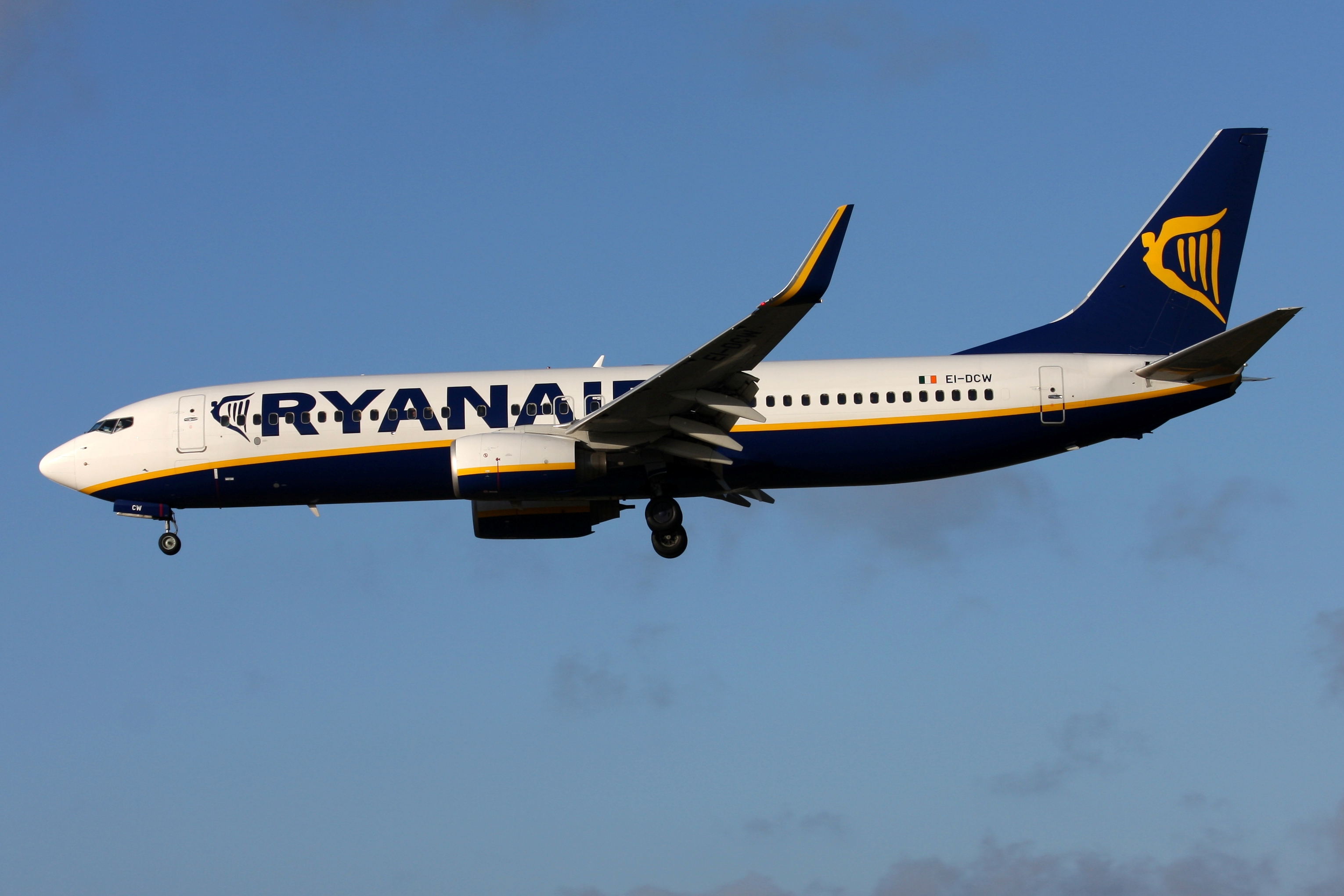
A Ryanair Boeing 737-800. Ryanair is the largest low-cost airline in Europe and second largest in the world.

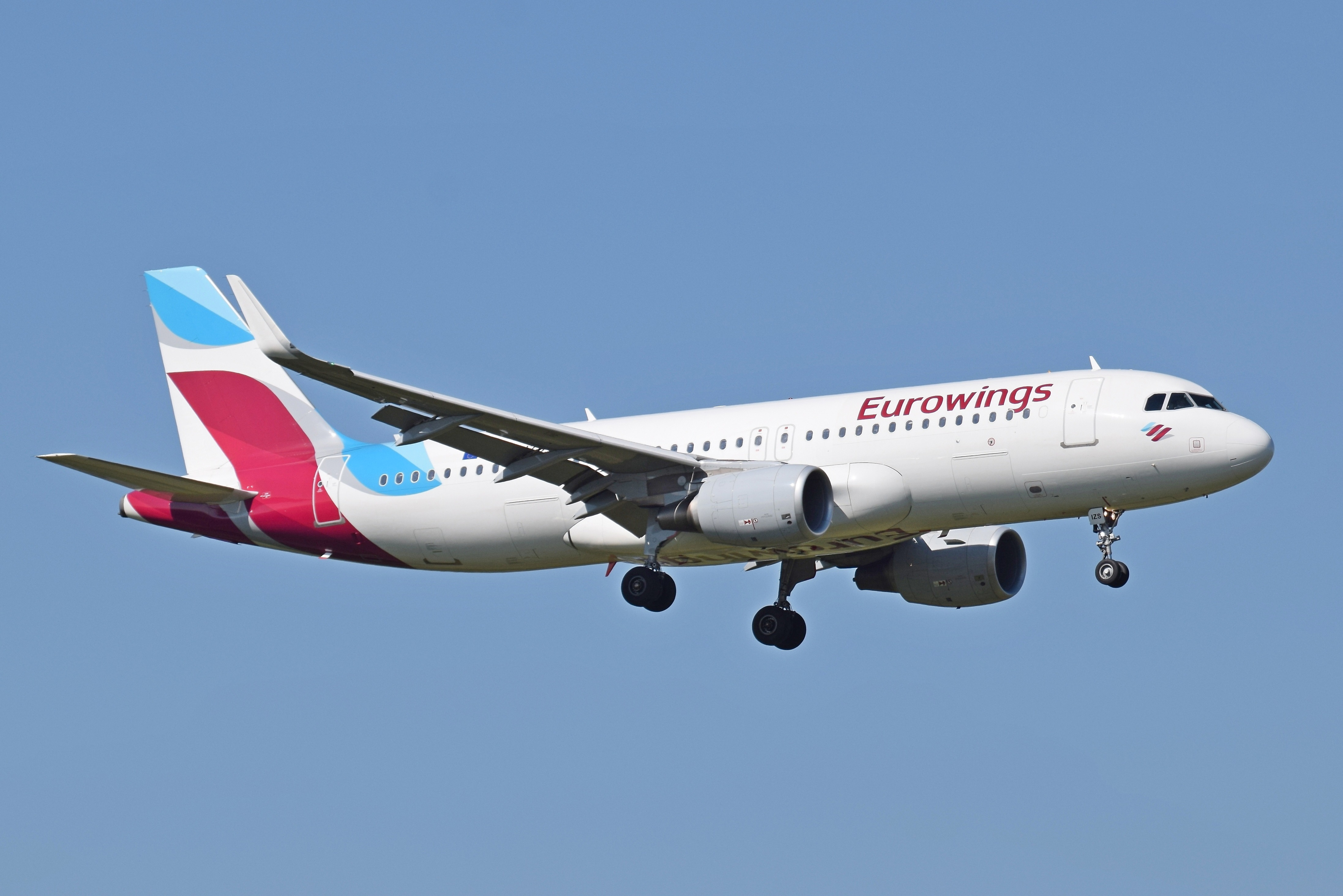
Eurowings Airbus A320-200

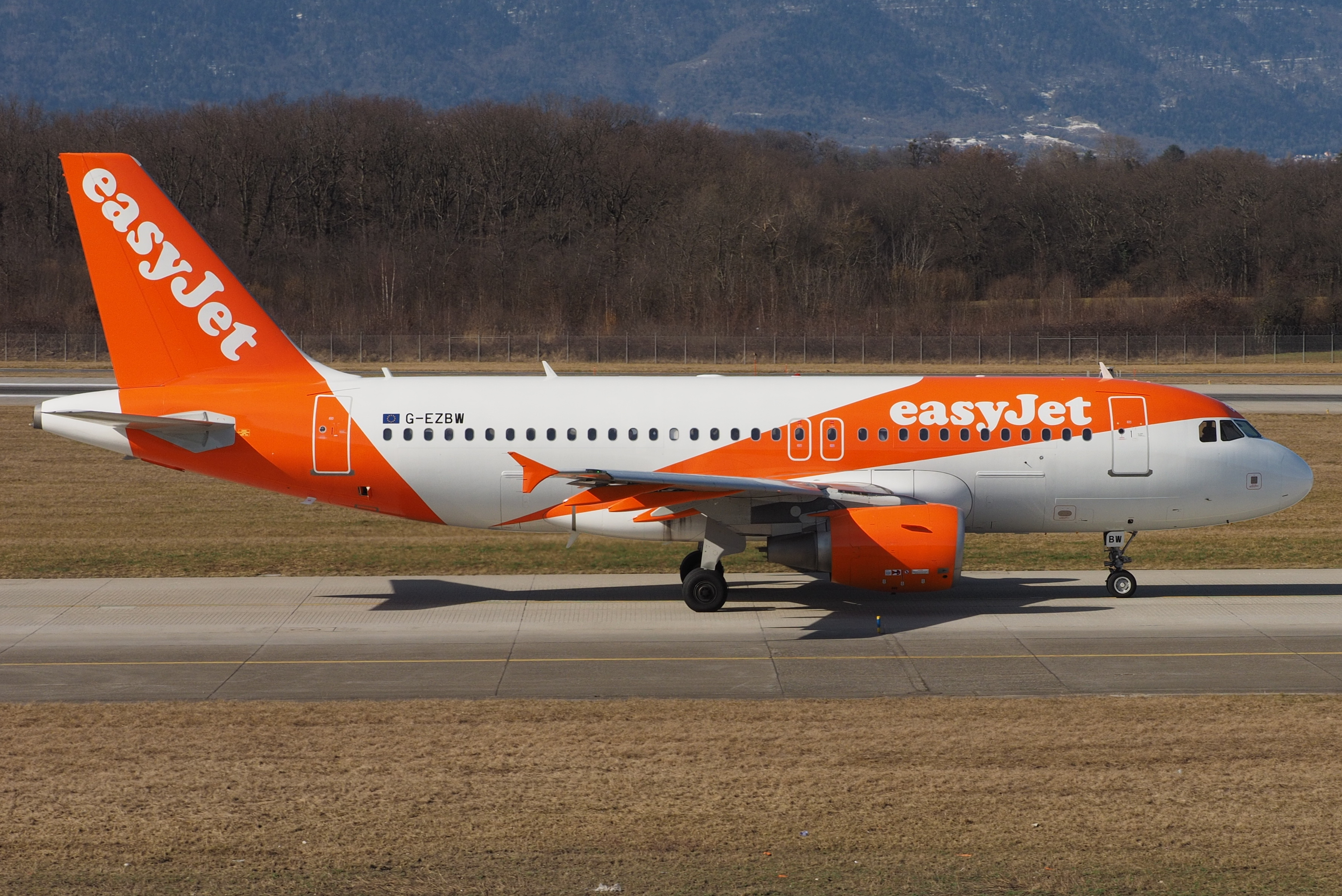
An Airbus A319 of EasyJet, the largest budget airline in the United Kingdom.

Austria
- EasyJet Europe
Belgium
- TUI fly Belgium
Czech Republic
- Smartwings
Denmark
- TUI fly Nordic
Finland
- TUI fly Nordic
France
- French Bee
- Transavia France
Germany
- Eurowings
- TUI fly Deutschland
Hungary
- Wizz Air
- Smartwings Hungary
Ireland
- Ryanair
Italy
- Aeroitalia
- Neos
Malta
- Eurowings Europe
- Lauda Europe
- Malta Air
- Wizz Air Malta
Moldova
- FlyOne
- HiSky
Netherlands
- Transavia
- TUI fly Netherlands
Norway
- Norse Atlantic Airways
- Norwegian Air Shuttle
- TUI fly Nordic
Poland
- Buzz
- Smartwings Poland
Romania
- FlyOne Airline
- HiSky Europe
Russia
- Azimuth
- Pobeda
- Smartavia
Spain
- Air Europa Express
- Iberia Express
- Iberojet
- Level
- Volotea
- Vueling
Sweden
- Norwegian Air Sweden
- TUI fly Nordic
Switzerland
- EasyJet Switzerland
Ukraine
- SkyUp
Slovakia
- Smartwings Slovakia
United Kingdom
- EasyJet
- Jet2.com
- Norse Atlantic UK
- Ryanair UK
- TUI Airways
- Wizz Air UK

== Oceania ==
Australia
- Jetstar

== Largest low-cost carriers ==
This is a list of largest low-cost carriers in the world, ranked by number of transported passengers, shown below in millions.

Ranks	Airline / holding	'25	'24	'23	'22	'21	'20	'19	'18	'17	'16	'15	'14	'13	'12	'11	'10	Sources
1	(Republic of Ireland) Ryanair	206.6	197.1	181.7	160.4	72.5	52.1	152.4	139.1	128.8	116.8	101.4	86.4	81.4	79.6	76.4	72.7	
2	(United Kingdom) easyJet^{1}	93.4	89.7	82.8	69.7	20.4	48.1	96.1	88.5	80.2	73.1	69.9	65.3	61.4	59.2	55.5	49.7	
3	(Malaysia) Air Asia Group^{2}	–	–	–	34.2	14.5	23.0	83.5	73.0	63.3	56.6	50.6	45.6	42.6	34.1	29.9	25.7	
4	(Indonesia) Lion Air Group^{3}	–	16.0	18.7	18.9	9.9	12.7	25.5	36.4	35.4	32.4	–	45.0	37.9	32.0	27.0	20.5	
5	(Brazil) Gol Transportes Aéreos	–	–	30.2	27.3	18.8	16.7	36.4	33.4	32.5	30.7	27.1	25.7	21.0	15.0	13.6	10.9	
6	(Norway) Norwegian Air Shuttle	27.3	22.6	20.6	17.8	3.1	6.8	36.3	37.3	33.2	29.3	25.8	24.0	20.7	17.7	15.7	13.0	
7	(Spain) Vueling	–	–	36.7	31.9	14.3	9.6	34.5	32.7	29.6	27.8	24.8	21.5	17.2	14.8	12.3	11.0	
8	(Turkey) Pegasus Airlines	–	–	31.9	26.9	20.1	14.7	30.8	30.0	27.8	24.1	22.3	19.7	16.9	13.6	11.3	8.6	
9	(Hungary) Wizz Air^{5}	69.7	63.4	62.0	51.1	27.1	10.2	16.7	39.8	33.8	28.3	22.8	19.2	12.0	11.2	9.6	7.8	5.8
10	(Australia) Jetstar^{6}	–	–	–	–	–	–	–	–	–	–	18.9	17.1	15.2	10.5	9.7	8.0	
11	(Philippines) Cebu Pacific^{7}	–	–	–	–	–	–	22.5	20.3	19.7	19.1	18.4	16.9	14.4	12.3	10.5	–	
12	(United States) Spirit Airlines	–	–	–	–	–	–	34.5	29.3	24.1	21.6	17.9	14.3	12.4	10.4	8.5	7.0	
13	(India) SpiceJet	–	–	–	–	–	–	–	–	–	–	11.7	12.6	11.7	9.5	8.6	6.6	
14	(Netherlands) Transavia^{8}	–	–	21.4	–	–	–	16.6	15.8	14.8	13.3	10.8	9.9	8.9	-	-	-	
15	(United States) Allegiant Air	–	–	–	–	–	–	–	–	–	–	9.4	8.0	7.1	6.6	6.1	5.9	
16	(United Arab Emirates) flydubai	–	13.8	10.6	–	–	–	–	–	10.9	10.4	9.0	7.3	6.8	5.1	–	–	
17	(Vietnam) VietJet Air^{9}	–	–	–	–	–	–	–	–	–	–	8.5	7.0	6.8	6.5	6.0	–	
18	(China) Spring Airlines	–	–	–	–	–	–	–	–	–	–	7.9	7.6	6.6	6.7	5.8	5.3	
19	(United Arab Emirates) AirArabia^{10}	–	–	–	–	–	–	–	–	–	–	–	6.8	6.1	5.3	4.7	4.5	
20	(United Kingdom) Jet2.com	–	–	–	–	–	–	14.4	12.2	9.7	7.1	5.9	6.0	5.5	4.8	4.2	3.4	
21	(Thailand) Nok Air	–	–	–	–	–	–	–	–	–	–	4.8	5.0	4.5	3.3	3.7	3.9	
22	(South Africa) Mango	–	–	–	–	–	–	–	–	–	–	2.3	1.8	1.6	1.4	1.3	1.3	
23	(South Africa) Fastjet^{11}	–	–	–	–	–	–	–	–	–	–	0.8	0.6	0.4	<0.1	–	–	

Notes
- ^1 Includes EasyJet Switzerland.
- ^2 Includes AirAsia X, Indonesia AirAsia, Philippines AirAsia, Thai AirAsia and Thai AirAsia X.
- ^3 Includes Batik Air, Wings Air, Batik Air Malaysia, Thai Lion Air, Super Air Jet, Lion BizJet (charter airline division) and Lion Parcel (cargo airline division).
- ^5 Includes Wizz Air Abu Dhabi and Wizz Air UK.
- ^6 Includes Jetstar Asia, Jetstar Japan and Jetstar Pacific.
- ^7 Includes Cebgo.
- ^8 Includes Transavia France.
- ^9 Includes Thai Vietjet Air.
- ^10 Includes Air Arabia Maroc, Air Arabia Egypt and Air Arabia Jordan.
- ^11 Includes Fastjet Tanzania and Fastjet Zimbabwe.

== Defunct low-cost carriers ==
=== Africa ===
Algeria
- Antinea Airlines
- Ecoair International
Egypt
- FlyEgypt
Morocco
- Atlas Blue
- Jet4you
Mozambique
- Fastjet Mozambique
South Africa
- 1time
- Kulula
- Mango
- SA Express
- Skywise Airlines
- Velvet Sky
Tanzania
- Fastjet Tanzania
Zimbabwe
- Zimbabwe flyafrica.com

=== Americas ===
Argentina
- Norwegian Air Argentina
- Sol Líneas Aéreas
Barbados
- REDjet
Brazil
- BRA Transportes Aéreos
- OceanAir
- WebJet Linhas Aéreas
Canada
- Air Canada Tango
- Canada 3000
- Canada Jetlines
- CanJet
- Greyhound Air
- Harmony Airways
- Jetsgo
- Lynx Air
- Swoop (re-integrated into WestJet)
- Sunwing Airlines (merged into WestJet)
- Vistajet
- Wardair
- WestJet (transitioned to full-service carrier)
- Zip
- Zoom Airlines
Chile
- Latin American Wings
Colombia
- AIRES
- Intercontinental de Aviación
- Viva Air Colombia
Costa Rica
- Aeropostal Alas de Centroamerica
Honduras
- EasySky
Ecuador
- Icaro Air
Mexico
- Aero California
- Aladia
- Aviacsa
- Avolar
- Click Mexicana (until 2008; Click was rebranded MexicanaClick and was no longer a low-cost airline)
- Interjet
- Líneas Aéreas Azteca
- SARO
- TAESA Lineas Aéreas
Peru
- Viva Air Perú
United States
- Air Florida
- AirTran Airways (acquired by Southwest Airlines)
- America West Airlines (merged into US Airways)
- ATA Airlines
- Braniff (1991–1992)
- Eastern Air Lines (2015)
- Hooters Air
- Independence Air
- JetTrain
- MetroJet
- Midway Airlines
- National Airlines
- Pacific Southwest Airlines
- People Express
- Safe Air
- Skybus Airlines
- SkyValue
- Song (operations folded into Delta Air Lines)
- Southeast Airlines
- Spirit Airlines
- Streamline Air
- Ted (operations folded into United Airlines)
- Tower Air
- ValuJet Airlines
- Vanguard Airlines
- Virgin America (merged with Alaska Airlines)
- Western Pacific Airlines
Uruguay
- U Air

=== Asia ===
Armenia
- Fly Arna
Azerbaijan
- AZALJet
- Buta Airways
Bahrain
- Bahrain Air
Georgia
- Flyvista
Hong Kong
- Oasis Hong Kong Airlines
India
- Air Asia India (merged with Air India Express)
- Go First
- JetKonnect (merged with Jet Airways)
- Jetlite (merged with Jet Airways)
- Kingfisher Red
- Paramount Airways
- Simplifly Deccan
Indonesia
- Adam Air
- Bali Air
- Batavia Air
- Indonesia AirAsia X

Israel
- Up
Japan
- Air Next
- AirAsia Japan
- Link Airs
- JAL Express
- Vanilla Air (merged with Peach Aviation)
Jordan
- Air Arabia Jordan
Kuwait
- Wataniya Airways
Kyrgyzstan
- Air Manas
Macau
- Viva Macau
Malaysia
- MYAirline
- Rayani Air
Nepal
- Cosmic Air
- Fly Yeti
Pakistan
- Bhoja Air
- Rayyan Air
- Shaheen Air
Philippines
- Spirit of Manila Airlines
- Zest Airways (merged into Philippines AirAsia)
Republic of Korea
- Air Pohang
- T'way Air (Rebranded as Trinity Airways)
Saudi Arabia
- Sama
Singapore
- Jetstar Asia
- Tigerair (merged with Scoot)
- Valuair (acquired in 2005 by Jetstar Asia; dissolved in 2014)
Sri Lanka
- Mihin Lanka (merged with SriLankan Airlines)
Taiwan
- U-Land Airlines
- V Air
Thailand
- NokScoot
- One-Two-GO Airlines
- Solar Air
United Arab Emirates
- Kang Pacific Airlines
- Wizz Air Abu Dhabi
Uzbekistan
- HumoAir

=== Europe ===
Albania
- Albatros Airways
- Belle Air
Austria
- Laudamotion
- Level Europe
- Niki
Belgium
- Virgin Express (merged with SN Brussels Airlines to form Brussels Airlines)
Cyprus
- Eurocypria
- Helios Airways
Czech Republic
- Blue Air Moravia
Denmark
- Sterling Airlines
- Transavia Denmark
Faroe Islands
- FaroeJet
Finland
- Flying Finn
France
- Air Turquoise
- Flywest
Germany
- Air Berlin (became a full-service airline in 2010 and collapsed in 2017)
- DBA
- Germanwings (merged with Eurowings)
- HLX (merged with Hapagfly to Tuifly, city routes then sold to Air Berlin)
- OLT Express Germany
Greece
- Ellinair
- Hellas Jet
- Macedonian Airlines
Iceland
- Iceland Express
- Loftleiðir
- Play
- WOW Air
Ireland
- Norwegian Air International
Italy
- Air One
- Air Service Plus
- Alpieagles
- Blu-express
- Club Air
- MyAir
- Volare Airlines
Netherlands
- V Bird
Norway
- Color Air
- Feel Air
- Flyr
- Norwegian Long Haul
Poland
- Air Polonia
- Centralwings
- Direct Fly
- GetJet
- OLT Express Poland
Romania
- Bees Airlines
- Blue Air
- Carpatair (now operates as a regional airline)
- Fly Romania
Russia
- Avianova
- Dobrolet
- Sky Express
Serbia
- Centavia
Slovakia
- SkyEurope
Sweden
- Flyme
- FlyNordic
- Snowflake
Ukraine
- Bees Airline
- Wizz Air Ukraine
United Kingdom
- AB Airlines
- Air Scotland
- bmibaby
- Court Line
- Debonair
- Duo Airways
- Flybe
- flyglobespan
- Go
- Laker Airways
- Monarch Airlines
- Norwegian Air UK

=== Oceania ===
Australia
- Air Australia
- Bonza
- Compass Airlines
- East-West Airlines
- Impulse Airlines (acquired by Qantas and rebranded as Jetstar and QantasLink)
- Tigerair Australia
- Virgin Blue (transitioned into a full-service airline in 2011 and renamed Virgin Australia)
New Zealand
- Freedom Air
- Kiwi Airlines
- Pacific Blue Airlines (now codeshares with Air New Zealand and is a full service brand — Virgin Australia)

== See also ==
- Flag carrier
- List of regional airlines
- Lists of airlines
