= Ryan Airlines =

Ryan Airlines may refer to:

- Ryan Aeronautical, a San Diego aircraft manufacturer founded in 1934. After 1969, part of Teledyne and later, Northrop Grumman
- Ryan Air Services, a cargo and passenger airline operating in Bush Alaska
- Ryan Airline Company, an early aviation concern associated with Charles Lindbergh
- Ryan Aviation, an American cargo and charter airline (1977–1988), later known as Ryan International Airlines
- Ryan International Airlines, an American contract, cargo and charter airline (1989–2013)
- Ryanair, European budget airline based in Ireland, UK, Poland, Malta and Austria

== See also ==
- Rayani Air, former Malaysian carrier
