= HumoAir =

Airline of Uzbekistan

IATA	ICAO	Call sign
HJ	USW	Aksar
- Founded: 2020
- Commenced operations: December 15, 2023
- Ceased operations: March 11, 2024
- Hubs: Tashkent
- Fleet size: 2
- Destinations: 5
- Headquarters: Tashkent, Uzbekistan
- Key people: Andrey Chernyaev, Chairman
- Website: flyhumo.com

HumoAir was a low-cost airline based in Tashkent, Uzbekistan.

== History ==
=== Foundation ===
HumoAir was established by Uzbekistan's national airline, Uzbekistan Airways. The country's Cabinet of Ministers signed a decree to transfer a fleet of 43 An-2 aircraft to HumoAir in January 2020. The carrier received an AOC in May 2020. Switzerland's Valleyroad Capital S.A acquired HumoAir at the start of 2023 for $2.4 million. The deal planned to revitalize the airline and re-brand it as a low-cost airline. It launched its first passenger flight on December 15, 2023, from Islam Karimov Tashkent International Airport.

=== Suspension ===
On 29 February 2024 HumoAir announced suspension of all flights since 11 March 2024 until April 2024. The decision to suspend domestic flights was announced as part of HumoAir's broader strategy to prepare for the launch of routes to international destinations such as Kazakhstan and Azerbaijan. This transition entails replanning and restructuring efforts within the airline. As of May 2024 all flight operations remain suspended.

== Destinations ==
As of March 2024 and prior to suspension of operations, HumoAir served the following destinations:

Country	City	Airport	Notes	Refs
Uzbekistan	Bukhara	Bukhara International Airport		
Uzbekistan	Fergana	Fergana International Airport	Terminated	
Uzbekistan	Nukus	Nukus Airport		
Uzbekistan	Qarshi	Qarshi Airport		
Uzbekistan	Samarqand	Samarqand International Airport	Terminated	
Uzbekistan	Tashkent	Islam Karimov Tashkent International Airport	Hub	
Uzbekistan	Termez	Termez Airport		
Uzbekistan	Urgench	Urgench International Airport		

== Fleet ==
=== Current fleet ===
From launch to suspension of flights, the company operated with wet leased aircraft from Fly2Sky Airlines :

HumoAir fleet
Aircraft	In service	Orders	Seats	Notes
Airbus A320-200	2	–	180	both leased from Fly2Sky Airlines
Total	2	–		

=== Fleet development ===
At a launch event held by the airline in October 2023, HumoAir announced its plan to launch an all-Airbus fleet of A320 and A321 aircraft. The initial fleet would include four aircraft, rising to 18 planes by the end of 2025. The airline first aircraft, was shipped to Tashkent on 12 December 2023. It was 15 years old in wetlease from Bulgarian airline Fly2Sky Airlines. The aircraft spent most of its life in South America, beginning with TACA International Airlines, before being transferred to Avianca El Salvador.
