= Fastjet =

Holding company

fastjet Limited
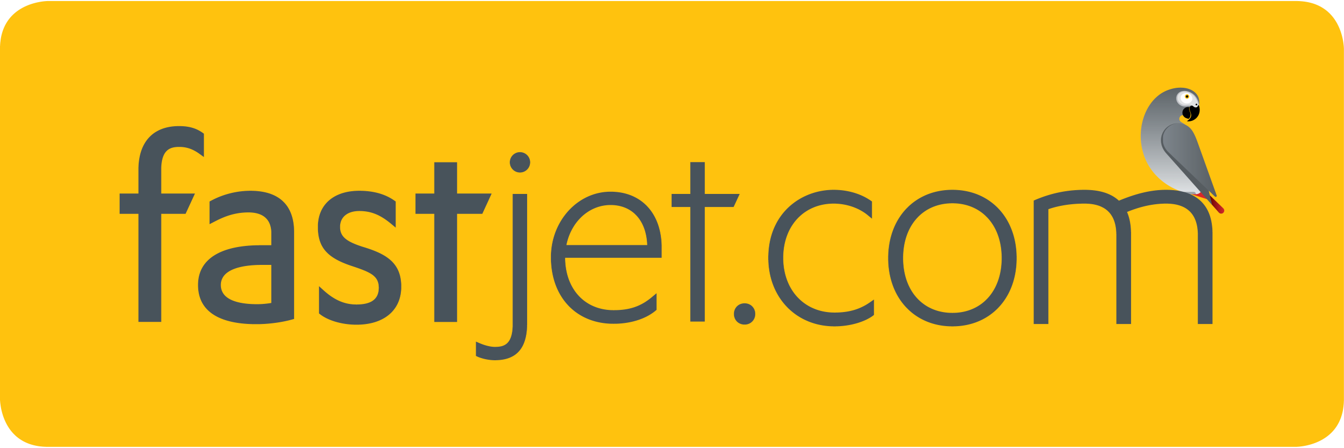
- Type: Private company
- Industry: Airline
- Headquarters: Johannesburg, South Africa
- Area served: Zimbabwe, South Africa
- Key people: Kirsten King (CEO); Michelle da Costa (CFO)
- Revenue: ▼US$ 64.9 m million (2024)
- Operating income: ▲US$ 24.8m million (2024)
- Website: fastjet.com

Fastjet Limited, known and styled as fastjet Limited, is an African airline brand that began flight operations in 2012 in Tanzania. It currently has two airline operations in the Group: Fastjet Zimbabwe, flying scheduled operations from Harare, and Federal Airlines, providing non-scheduled shuttle and charter services inside South Africa and regionally. Plans have been announced to recommence Fastjet Mozambique operations in 2026. Fastjet Limited is the Group’s parent company, headquartered in Johannesburg, and incorporated in England and Wales, with its registered office in London.

== History ==
,

=== Initial proposals ===
In June 2012, to start operations, Rubicon Diversified Investments Plc (later renamed Fastjet Plc) completed the acquisition of Lonrho's airline division for a transaction value of US$85.7M, satisfied by the issue of Rubicon ordinary shares to Lonrho. Key shareholders in the enlarged company were Lonrho and Sir Stelios Haji-Ioannou, through his easyGroup Holdings Limited (“easyGroup”). The airline division acquired included the African regional airline Fly 540, operating in Kenya, Sudan, Tanzania, and Uganda, which would form the platform for the development of a low-cost carrier for Africa, branded ‘Fastjet’ under the terms of the easyGroup brand license agreement.

The airline chose Dar es Salaam, Tanzania as its first operating base in Africa, with flights from Julius Nyerere International Airport commencing on 29 November 2012. Initially flights operated successfully between Dar es Salaam and Kilimanjaro, and between Dar es Salaam and Mwanza. Further routes were to be added quickly, both domestically and to other East African destinations.

=== Expansion of services ===
As well as expanding services from the base in Tanzania, in October 2015 the company obtained an Air Operator's Certificate (AOC) for Zimbabwe, and Fastjet Zimbabwe was launched. The initial flights between its base at Harare International Airport to Victoria Falls commenced on 28 October 2015, and flights to Johannesburg commenced from 1 February 2016 and flights to Nelspruit Kruger Mpumalanga and Maun Botswana have recently been announced from Victoria Falls commencing on 16 March 30 June 2022.

With troubled operations and continued losses, majority shareholder Stelios Haji-Ioannou through his holding in EasyGroup successfully changed the board of Fastjet Plc with the departure of six board members in a short period of time. Ed Winters was replaced as CEO by Nico Bezuidenhout, from rival low-cost airline Mango, on 1 August 2016.

Bezuidenhout instigated a 'Stabilisation Plan', which included reducing unprofitable routes, switching [KJ3] [NN4] from A319s to (smaller) Embraer ERJ145 aircraft and moving the airline's headquarters from London Gatwick Airport to Africa - later revealed as a move to Johannesburg. The aim was to achieve cashflow breakeven in the fourth quarter of 2017. There was further fundraising in September 2017, to raise not less than US$44m.

In July 2019, Fastjet announced that its CEO, Nico Bezuidenhout, would step down after three years in the role. Following the announcement, Mark Hurst, the deputy group chief executive officer, was appointed to lead the airline until a permanent replacement was named.

In November 2023 Fastjet announced an increase of its frequency between Bulawayo and Johannesburg from daily to 12 weekly flights. It also re-introduced its morning service, with an inaugural flight from Johannesburg OR Tambo International (JNB) on an Embraer 145 aircraft.

== Corporate affairs ==
=== Ownership ===
Fastjet Limited is the Group's parent company, incorporated and domiciled in England and Wales.

Until 24 August 2020, it was traded on the London Stock Exchange Alternative Investment Market (AIM) (FJET:LSE). fastjet Limited’s holding company is now Solenta Aviation Holdings Limited, a company registered in Malta. As at 31 December 2024, Solenta Aviation Holdings Limited held 81% of the group’s equity.

=== Subsidiaries ===
Two airlines are currently operational: Fastjet Zimbabwe, domestically in Zimbabwe and internationally, and FedAir, with mainly charter and safari business in South Africa. The subsidiaries are included in the Group financial statements, because although the Group holds 50% or less of the voting rights in each, it controls the management, operations and distributions through contractual agreements as well as its shareholding.

Trading name	Operating base	Operating company	Relationship	Voting rights held	Notes/refs
Fastjet Zimbabwe	Harare, Zimbabwe	Fastjet Zimbabwe Ltd.	Brand Licensee	49%	
Federal Air	Johannesburg, South Africa	Federal Airlines (Pty.) Ltd.	Brand Licensee ACMI Operator	25%	

==== Former subsidiaries ====
Fastjet Tanzania, the original Fastjet operation, was sold on 26 November 2018. Operations of Fastjet Zambia (49.5%) were discontinued in 2021.

Those of Fastjet Mozambique (100%) were also discontinued in 2021, although plans are in hand to relaunch flights in late 2026.

=== Brand ownership ===
The Fastjet brand was originally owned by Easygroup Holdings Ltd, and licensed to Fastjet Plc. Sir Stelios Haji-Ioannou established the Fastjet brand in 2012. On 29 June 2017 Fastjet Plc entered into an agreement with Easygroup Holdings Ltd to acquire all intellectual property rights associated with the Fastjet brand for $2.5 million.

=== Business trends ===
Fastjet Limited group results are shown below (as at years ending 31 December):

	2014	2015	2016	2017	2018	2019	2020	2021	2022	2023	2024
Turnover (US$ m)	53.8	65.1	68.5	46.2	38.5	40.8	16.0	27.9	64.1	66.9	64.9
Profit after tax (US$ m)	−72.1	−21.9	−48.1	−24.5	−65.0	−6.9	1.8	0.1	10.7	−8.9	2.6
Number of employees (average)	271	n/a	n/a	211	263	240	195	189	239	330	344
Number of passengers (m) (Note: for scheduled services only)	0.60	0.79	0.79	0.54	0.25	0.20	0.06	0.15	0.27	0.32	0.27
Passenger load factor (%) (Note: for scheduled services only)	73.3	66.7	53.7	71	72	67	61	64	77	77	76
Number of aircraft (scheduled) (at year end)	3	6	4	3	3	3	3	4			
Number of aircraft (shuttle/safari) (at year end)						4	6	6			
Notes/sources							(Note: 2020: Activities and income in fiscal 2020 were severely reduced by the impact of the coronavirus pandemic)				

=== Head office ===
Fastjet's Group head office is located in Johannesburg, South Africa. Prior to 2017, it was based at London Gatwick Airport in Crawley, West Sussex, but was moved to South Africa to be nearer to its business activities and to reduce costs.

Each locally incorporated airline has a registered/head office in its country of operation.

== Fleet ==
=== Current fleet ===
As of April 2023, the Fastjet fleet consists of the following aircraft:

- 5 Embraer ERJ-145
