= Fastjet Tanzania =

Low-cost airline in Tanzania

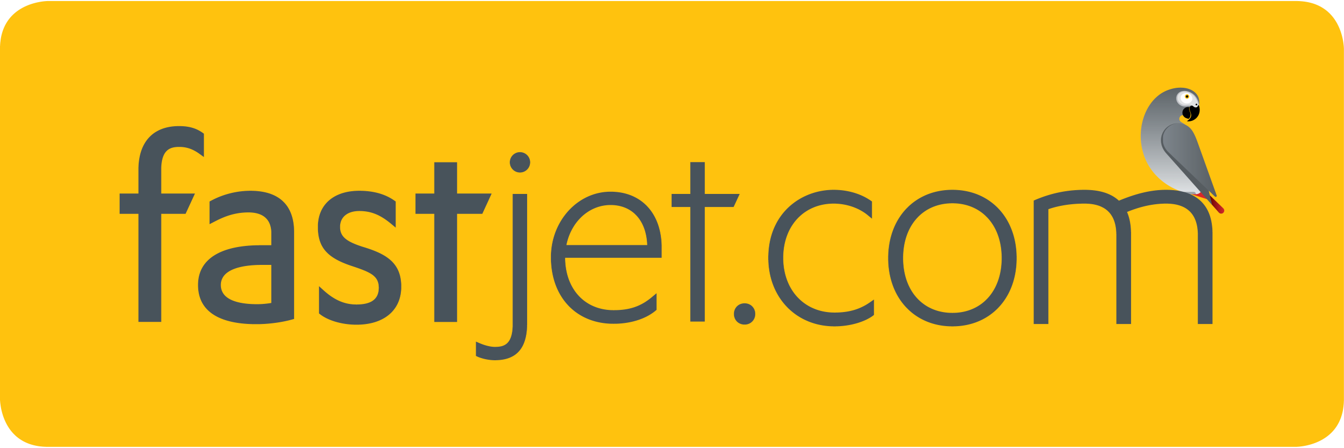
IATA	ICAO	Call sign
FN	FTZ	GREYBIRD
- Founded: 2011 as Fly540 Tanzania
- Commenced operations: 29 November 2012 as Fastjet Tanzania
- Ceased operations: 25 November 2019
- AOC #: 038
- Operating bases: Julius Nyerere International Airport
- Parent company: Fastjet Plc Group
- Headquarters: Ground floor, Samora Tower, Samora Avenue, Dar es salaam, Tanzania
- Website: www.fastjet.com

Fastjet Airlines Limited (Tanzania), also known as Fastjet Tanzania, was a low-cost airline that operated flights under the fastjet brand in Tanzania. The airline was founded in 2011 as Fly540 Tanzania, but on the acquisition of Fly540 in 2012, it was rebranded as Fastjet Tanzania. Based in Dar es Salaam, the airline carried more than 350,000 passengers in its first year of operations and sold one million seats by December 2014, but failed to make a profit, and went into liquidation on 25 November 2019.

== History ==
Fastjet Tanzania was founded in 2011 as Fly540 Tanzania, a subsidiary of Kenya-based Fly540. Using a Bombardier CRJ100 and a Dash 8-100, it flew to eight destinations in Tanzania and two in Kenya.

In June 2012, Fly540 was acquired by Rubicon Diversified Investments, which intended to merge all of Fly540's operations into its new venture Fastjet. Fly540 Tanzania suspended operations on 13 October 2012 before being rebranded as Fastjet Tanzania.

Fastjet Tanzania was Fastjet's first operating base in Africa, with flights from Julius Nyerere International Airport commencing on 29 November 2012. Initial flights operated successfully between Dar es Salaam and Kilimanjaro, and between Dar es Salaam and Mwanza. Further routes were to be added quickly, both domestically and to other East African destinations. By August 2015 it had come to operate domestic routes linking Dar es Salaam with Mwanza, Kilimanjaro and Mbeya, and four international routes from Dar es Salaam to Johannesburg, Harare, Entebbe, Lilongwe and Lusaka.

Ultimately unable to generate sufficient cash flow to cover its debts, the airline was declared insolvent and a liquidator appointed on 21 December 2019.

== Corporate affairs ==
=== Ownership ===
Fastjet Tanzania was originally 49% owned by Fastjet Plc. On 14 November 2014, it was announced that Fastjet Plc had entered into an agreement to sell an interest in fastjet Tanzania to Tanzanian investors. The issue of the shares brought the total Tanzanian legal and beneficial ownership of fastjet Tanzania to 51%.

=== Business trends ===
Fastjet Tanzania began trading on 29 November 2012, and financial results were incorporated in the Fastjet Plc group accounts. Some information was made available for the Tanzanian operation (as at year ending 31 December):

	2012	2013	2014	2015	2016
Turnover (US$ m)	3.6	26.1	53.8	64.6	59.7
Profits/losses after tax (US$ m)	−11.9	−21.9	−22.5	−24.5	−45.0
Number of passengers (m)	0.03	0.37	0.60	0.78	n/a*
Passenger load factor (%)	78.9**	72.5	73.3	66.7	n/a*
Number of aircraft (at year end)	3	3	3	5	3
Notes/sources	**Dec only				

Note: *Passenger numbers and load factors are only published at Group level.

=== Head office ===
Fastjet Tanzania maintained a head office in Samora Avenue, Dar es Salaam, Tanzania.

== Destinations ==
As of March 2018 (shortly before the operation closed), Fastjet Tanzania was serving the following destinations:

Base
Future
Terminated route

City	Country	IATA	ICAO	Airport
Arusha and Moshi	Tanzania	JRO	HTKJ	Kilimanjaro International Airport
Dar es Salaam	Tanzania	DAR	HTDA	Julius Nyerere International Airport ^{[Base]}
Entebbe	Uganda	EBB	HUEN	Entebbe International Airport (ended 3 December 2016)
Harare	Zimbabwe	HRE	FVHA	Harare International Airport
Johannesburg	South Africa	JNB	FAOR	OR Tambo International Airport (ended 15 January 2017)
Kigoma	Tanzania	TKQ	HTKA	Kigoma Airport
Lilongwe	Malawi	LLW	FWKI	Kamuzu International Airport (ended 8 February 2016)
Lusaka	Zambia	LUN	FLKK	Kenneth Kaunda International Airport
Mbeya	Tanzania	-	HTGW	Songwe Airport
Moroni	Comoros	HAH	FMCH	Prince Said Ibrahim International Airport
Mwanza	Tanzania	MWZ	HTMW	Mwanza Airport
Nairobi	Kenya	NBO	HKJK	Jomo Kenyatta International Airport (ended 3 December 2016)
Zanzibar City	Tanzania	ZNZ	HTZA	Abeid Amani Karume International Airport

== Cargo ==
Fastjet signed an agreement with one of Africa's largest cargo operators, BidAir Cargo, to carry cargo on its fleet of Airbus A319s.

== Fleet ==
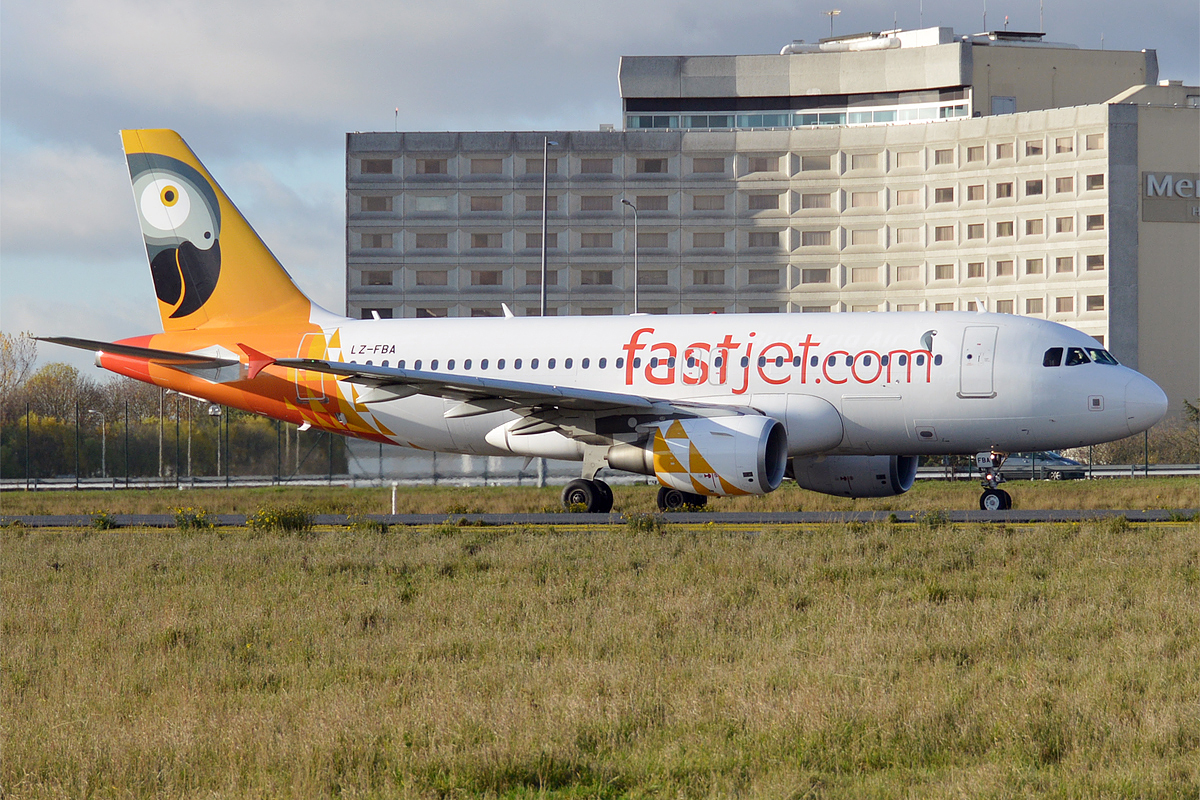
A Fastjet Tanzania Airbus A319 at Paris-Charles de Gaulle Airport.

The Fastjet Tanzania fleet included the following aircraft as of June 2017:

Fastjet Tanzania fleet
Aircraft	In service	Orders	Passengers	Notes
ATR 72-600	—	3	70	
Embraer 190	2	—	100	June 2019
Total	2	3		

== See also ==
- List of airlines of Tanzania
