= Fly2Sky Airlines =

Bulgarian charter airline

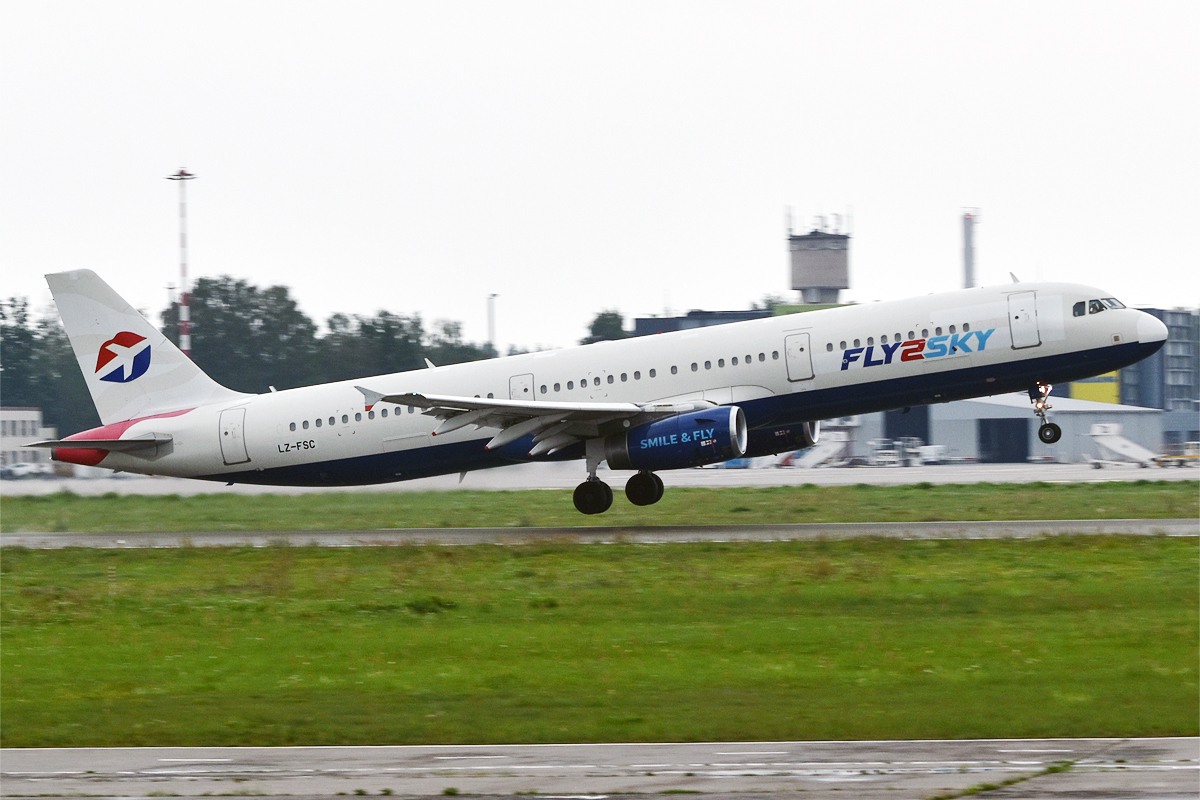
- Airbus A321-200
IATA	ICAO	Call sign
F6	VAW	SOFIA JET
- Founded: December 2016
- Commenced operations: 6 February 2017 (as Via Airways); 9 February 2019 (as Fly2Sky Airlines)
- AOC #: BG 57
- Fleet size: 10
- Destinations: Charter & ACMI
- Headquarters: Sofia, Bulgaria
- Key people: Petar Lavrinov (AM)
- Employees: 350+
- Website: www.fly2sky.aero

Fly2Sky Airlines is a Charter/ACMI aircraft operator specialized in leasing and air charter headquartered in Sofia, Bulgaria. The company mainly operates flights in the format of ACMI (Aircraft, Crew, Maintenance, Insurance).

== History ==
The airline was established in late 2016 as VIA Airways and began operations as a charter and ACMI (Aircraft, Crew, Maintenance, and Insurance) service provider in February of the following year. The fleet was formed by Airbus A320-200. Two years later the air carrier was renamed Fly2Sky Airlines.

Headquartered in Sofia, Bulgaria, the airline is registered within the European Union and operates under EASA regulations. Fly2Sky’s fleet consists primarily of Airbus A320 family aircraft, including A320 and A321 variants, which are widely used in short- to medium-haul operations. The airline emphasizes asset optimization, operational efficiency, and experienced leadership as core components of its strategy for sustainable growth in the ACMI and charter market.

== Fleet ==
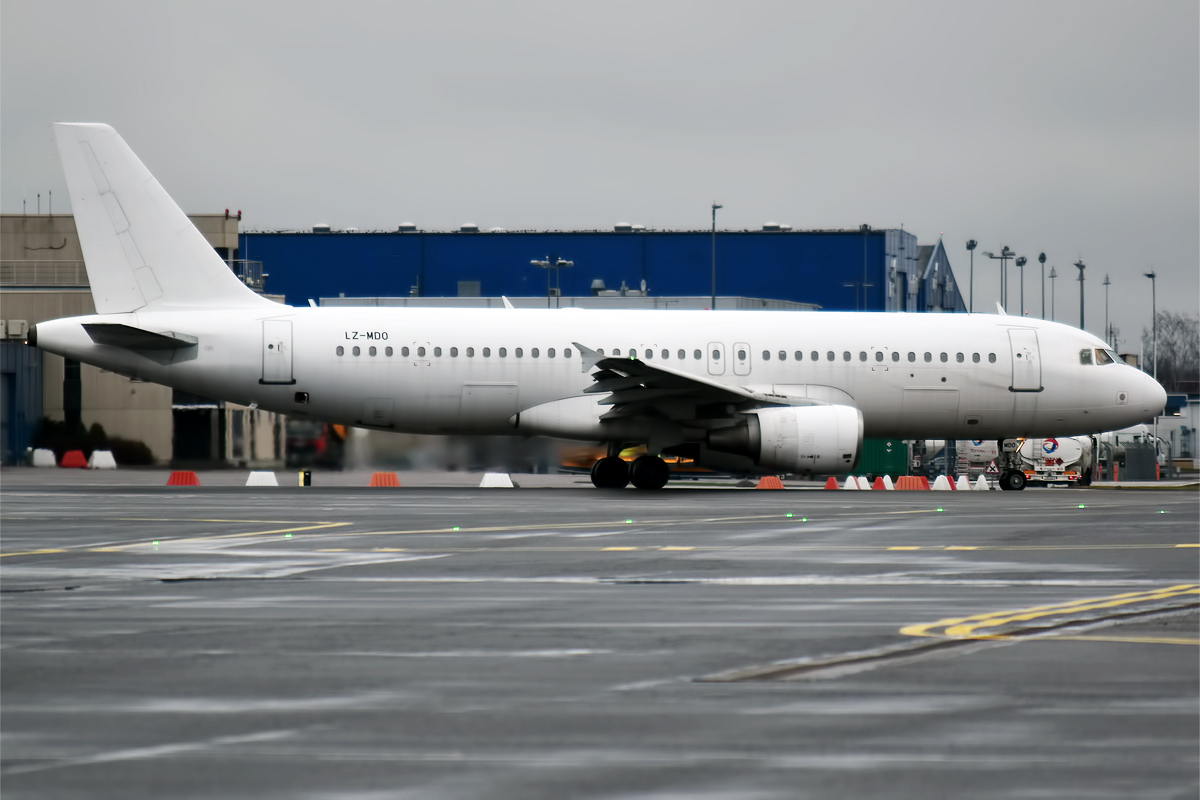
Airbus A320-200.

As of August 2025, Fly2Sky Airlines operates the following aircraft:

Fly2Sky fleet
Aircraft	In service	Orders	Passengers					Notes
Aircraft	In service	Orders	B	Y+	Y	Total	Refs	Notes
Airbus A320-200	8	2	12	—	138	150		2 orders expected to be delivered between June and August 2025.
Airbus A321-200	2	—	—	—	220	220	1	1 A321 to be retired.
Total	10	3						
