= Fastjet Zimbabwe =

Value-based airline in Zimbabwe

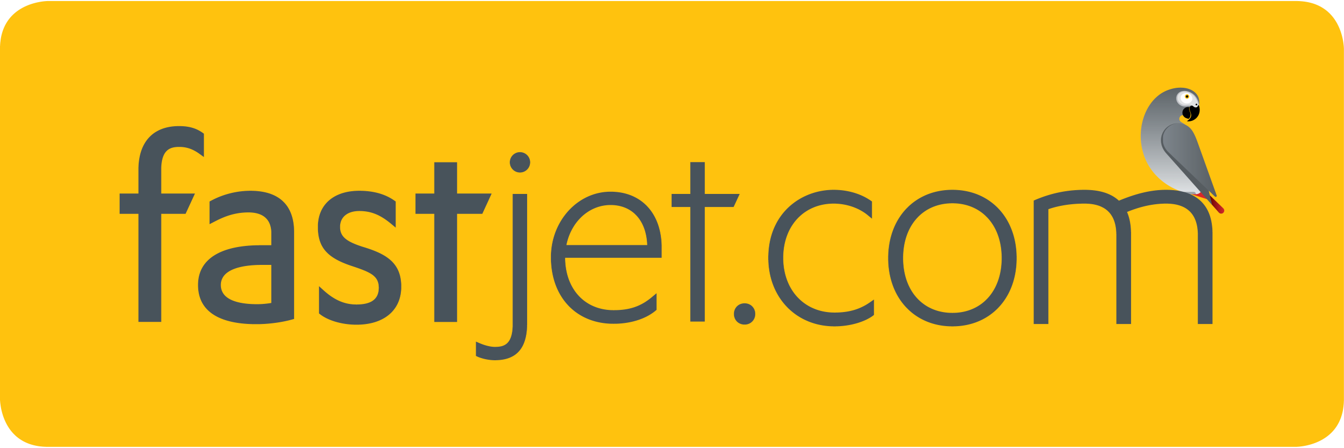
IATA	ICAO	Call sign
FN	FJW	ZIMBIRD
- Founded: 2015
- Commenced operations: 28 October 2015
- Operating bases: Harare International Airport
- Focus cities: Harare, Bulawayo, Victoria Falls, Lusaka, Johannesburg, Kruger Mpumalanga International Airport
- Fleet size: 7
- Destinations: 6
- Parent company: Fastjet Plc
- Key people: Donahue Cortes (CEO)
- Website: www.fastjet.com/zw/en

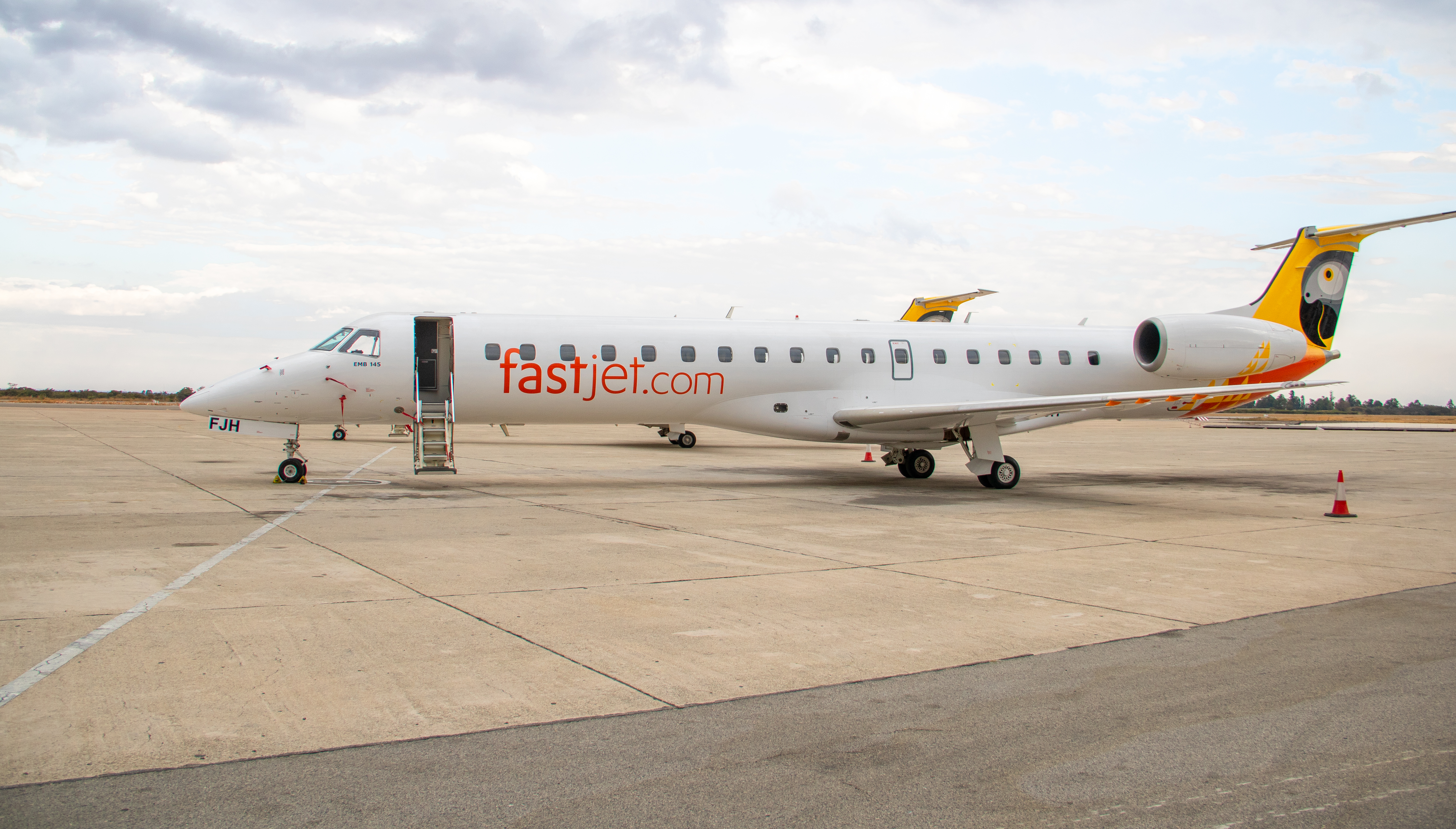
A Fastjet Embraer ERJ145

Fastjet Zimbabwe (Private) Limited, known and styled as fastjet Zimbabwe, is an IOSA registered Zimbabwean airline that has been incorporated to operate flights under the fastjet brand in Zimbabwe. It launched operations in October 2015 with flights from Harare to Victoria Falls, demonstrating its commitment to tourist development in the region.

== History ==
Fastjet announced on 25 March 2015 that it had received an Air Service Permit (ASP) from the Ministry of Transport and Infrastructural Development of the Government of Zimbabwe, responsible for administering the Civil Aviation Authority of Zimbabwe (CAAZ). Fastjet then obtained an Air Operator's Certificate (AOC) on 6 October 2015, and announced its plans to launch fastjet Zimbabwe, with initial flights between its base at Harare International Airport and Victoria Falls. Flights were planned to expand to other destinations, including domestically to Bulawayo and then internationally.

On 18 January 2016, Fastjet Zimbabwe declared its first international route between Harare and Johannesburg, to be served daily from 1 February 2016.

As part of the Stabilisation Plan of Fastjet plc from August 2016, which included a move to smaller aircraft across the Group, the single Airbus A319 based in Zimbabwe was replaced by (at first) one Embraer ERJ145 aircraft. A second ERJ145 was utilised from July 2017, with an increase in the number of routes and flights.

In August 2026, Fastjet leased an Airbus A320 from Global Airways, as a trial before considering adding more A320s to its fleet from 2027.

== Corporate affairs ==
=== Ownership ===
Fastjet Zimbabwe is a Zimbabwean-registered company that is 49 percent owned by Fastjet Limited. Fastjet Zimbabwe has a local board of directors, and meets all the required nationality standards under which it can be named by the Zimbabwean CAA as a designated airline to fly to other countries under the usual bilateral air services agreements.

=== Business trends ===
Fastjet Zimbabwe began operating in October 2015. Financial results are fully incorporated in the Fastjet Limited group accounts, with separate information usually also being made available for the Fastjet Zimbabwe operation (as at period ending 31 December) (although these figures do not include the Group's central costs):

	2015	2016	2017	2018	2019	2020	2021	2022	2023	2024
Turnover (US$ m)	0.3	9.4	12.9	26.0	25.2	11.8	22.6	50.0	50.1	44.7
Profit after tax (US$ m)	−4.0	−14.5	−7.1	−12.7	−1.7	−4.4	−4.3	2.9	−5.1	−0.6
Number of employees (average for year)			n/a*	54	81	83	87	91	110	103
Number of passengers (scheduled) (000s)	3	n/a*	n/a*	182	172	064	153	274	323	274
Passenger load factor (scheduled) (%)	n/a*	52	68	77	65	61	64	77	77	76
Number of aircraft (at year end)	1	1	2		4		4			
Notes/sources	Oct.-Dec.									

Note: *Some figures were only published at Group level.

=== Head office ===
Fastjet Zimbabwe maintains its head office in Harare, Zimbabwe; the registered office is located at Harare's RG Mugabe International Airport, domestic terminal building, Harare.

== Destinations ==
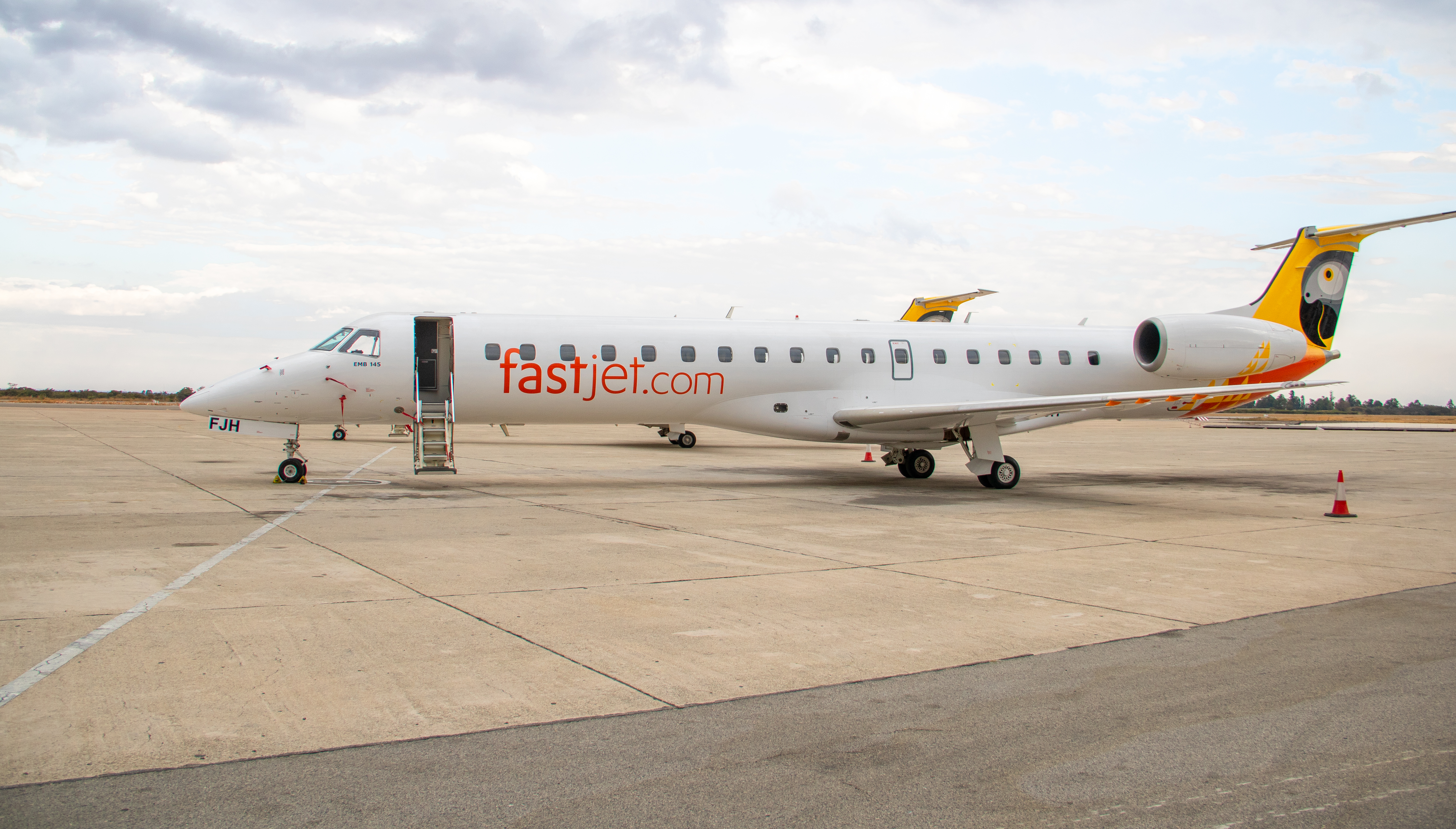
A fastjet ERJ145 parked at Harare's RG Mugabe International Airport

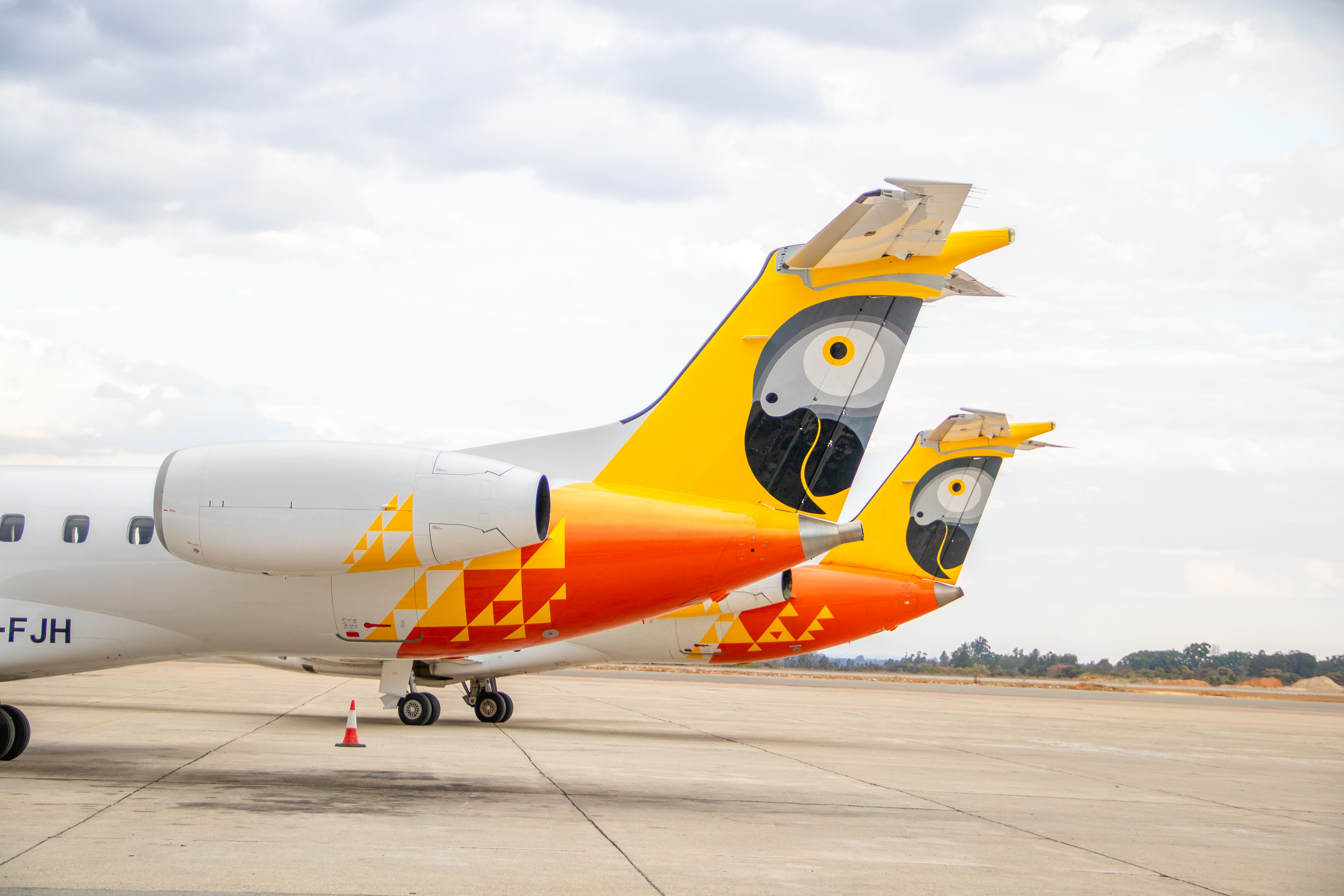
African Grey Parrot, fastjet mascot on the tail of an Embraer ERJ 145 aircraft, parked at Harare's RG Mugabe International Airport

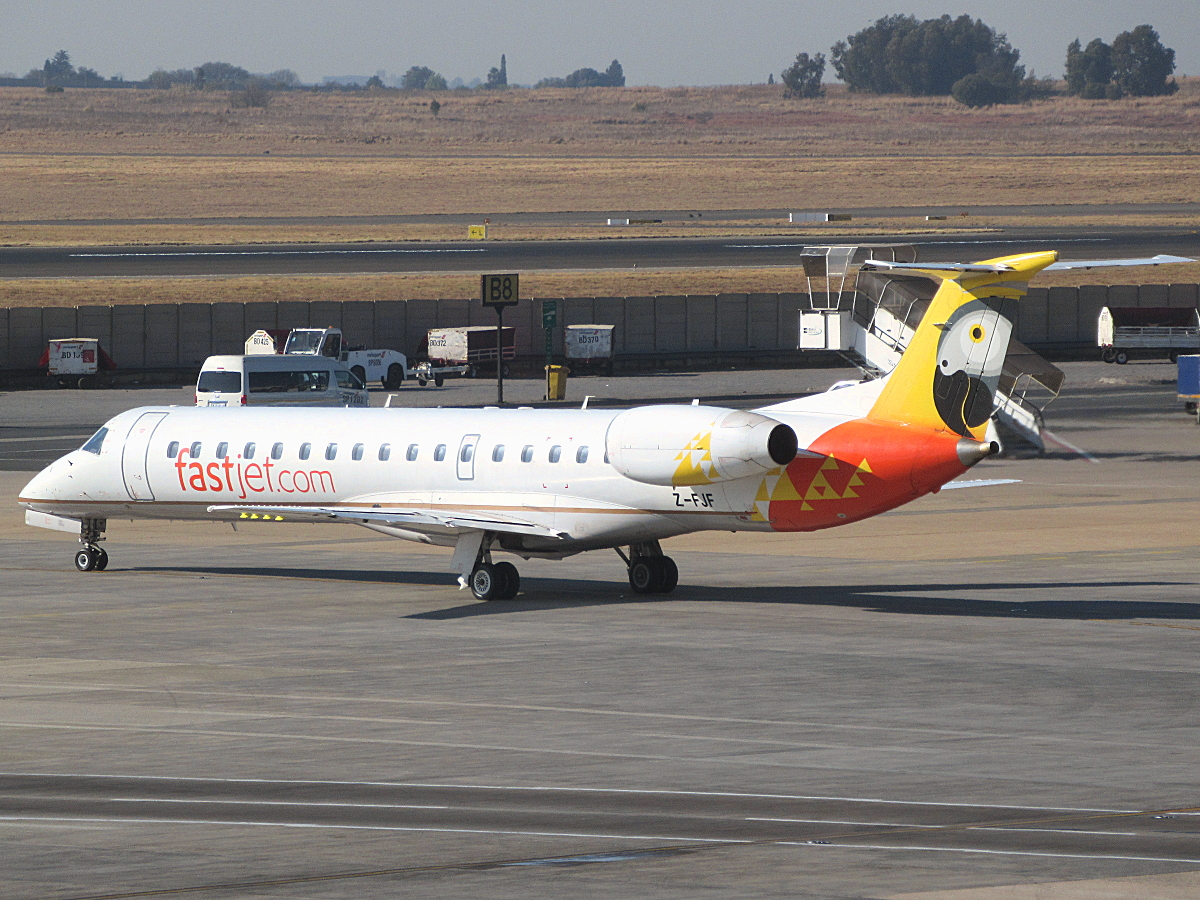
A fastjet Zimbabwe Embraer 145 at O. R. Tambo International Airport

As of April 2025, Fastjet Zimbabwe serves the following destinations:

Country	City	Airport
South Africa	Mbombela (Nelspruit)	Kruger Mpumalanga International Airport
South Africa	Johannesburg	O. R. Tambo International Airport
Zambia	Lusaka	Kenneth Kaunda International Airport
Zimbabwe	Bulawayo	Joshua Mqabuko Nkomo International Airport
Zimbabwe	Harare	Robert Gabriel Mugabe International Airport
Zimbabwe	Victoria Falls	Victoria Falls Airport

=== Interline agreement ===
Fastjet Zimbabwe interlines with the following airline/s:

- FlyNamibia

== Fleet ==
=== Current fleet ===
The Fastjet Zimbabwe fleet consists of the following aircraft as of August 2026:

Fastjet Zimbabwe fleet
Aircraft	In service	Orders	Passengers	Notes
Airbus A320-200	1	0	168	Leased from Global Airways
Embraer ERJ-145	6	0	50	
Total	7	0		

=== Historical fleet ===
Fastjet Zimbabwe initially operated an Airbus A319-100 aircraft.

== See also ==
- List of airlines of Zimbabwe
