= Fastjet Mozambique =

Mozambican airline

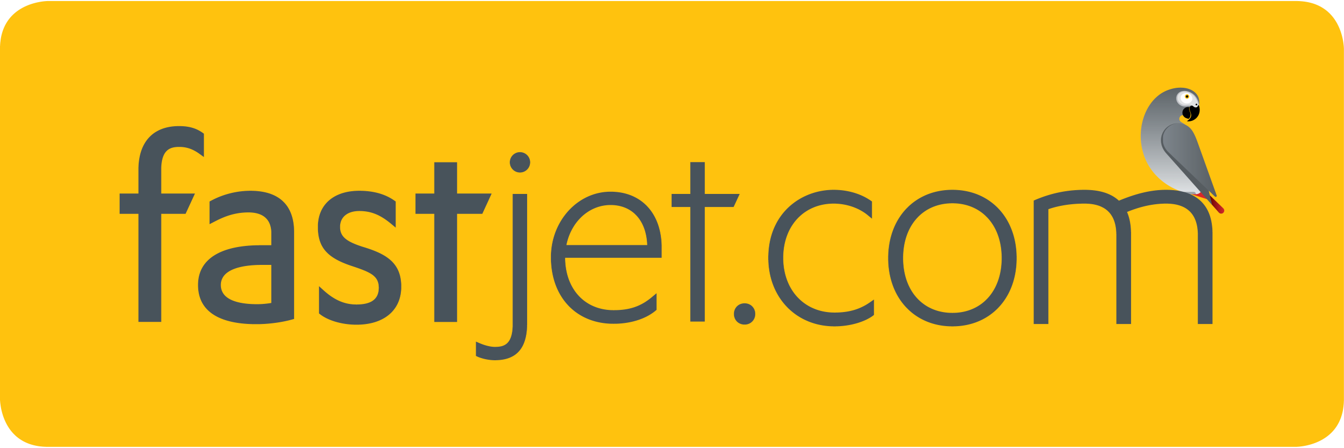
IATA	ICAO	Call sign
-	-	-
- Founded: 2017
- Commenced operations: 3 November 2017
- Ceased operations: 26 October 2019
- Fleet size: tba
- Destinations: tba
- Parent company: Solenta Aviation
- Headquarters: Beira, Mozambique
- Website: fastjet.com

Fastjet Mozambique, also known and styled as fastjet Mozambique, is a Mozambican low-cost airline that operated on major domestic routes under the fastjet brand in Mozambique from 2017 until 2019, and is set to relaunch in 2026. Fastjet entered the Mozambican market in partnership with Solenta Aviation Mozambique (SAM), which beforehand had specialised in charter flights. The airline operated for two years (2017-19) from a base in Maputo, and now plans to reintroduce services in 2026 from a base in Beira.

== History ==
In September 2017 the Government of Mozambique, through the Civil Aviation Institute of Mozambique (Instituto de Aviação Civil de Moçambique), licensed various airlines for the first time to provide domestic air services in Mozambique in addition to those of the state carrier LAM - Mozambique Airlines. One of the airlines selected was Solenta Airlines Mozambique, which at the time operated charter services to the oil and gas industry within the country.

Fastjet domestic operations in Mozambique commenced on 3 November 2017, initially to four destinations within the country. They were, however, suspended on 26 October 2019 and ceased all operations.

In May 2025, Fastjet announced that it had received permission from the Mozambican civil aviation regulator to restart flying domestic routes, and in December 2025 it confirmed that it had received long-awaited approval on 17 December for a scheduled services licence, clearing the way for it to launch regular domestic flights in the second half of 2026 under a revived Fastjet Mozambique brand.

== Corporate affairs ==
=== Ownership and structure ===
Fastjet Mozambique services were, and will be, operated under licence by Solenta Aviation Mozambique SA, the Mozambican subsidiary of a South African company, Solenta Aviation.

== Destinations ==
Fastjet Mozambique served the following destinations in 2017-19 (destinations for the 2026 relaunch have yet to be announced):

Country	City	Airport
Mozambique	Beira	Beira Airport
Mozambique	Maputo	Maputo International Airport ^{[Base]}
Mozambique	Nampula	Nampula Airport
Mozambique	Tete	Chingozi Airport

== Fleet ==
The Fastjet Mozambique fleet consisted of the following aircraft when operations were discontinued in October 2019:

Fastjet Mozambique fleet
Aircraft	In service	Orders	Passengers	Notes
Embraer ERJ 145	1	–	50	
Total	1	–		

The revised fleet for the 2026 relaunch is expected to consist of three Embraer ERJ 145 aircraft.

== See also ==
- Airlines of Africa
- Transport in Mozambique
