= Rayani Air =

Full-service airline in Malaysia

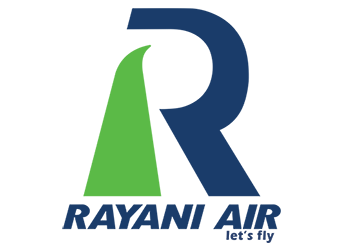

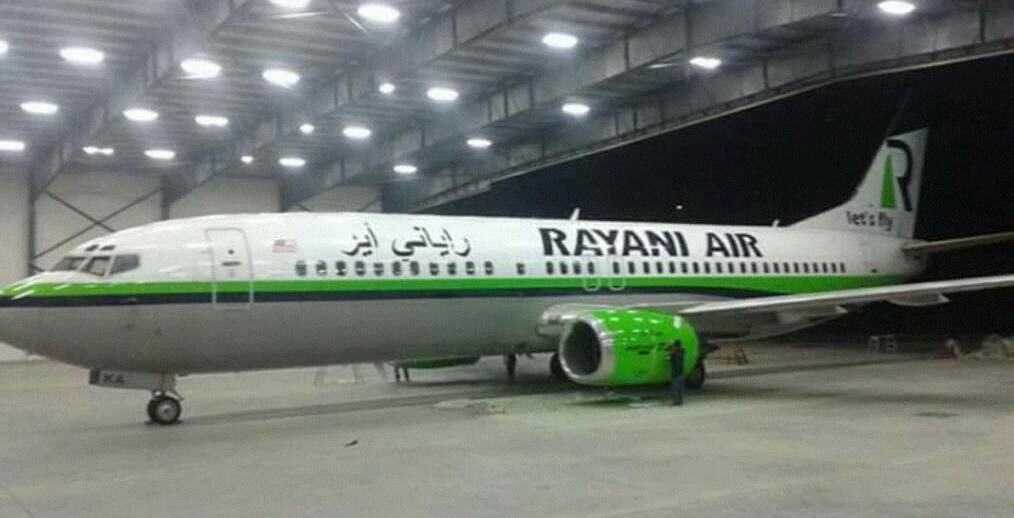
- Rayani Air Boeing 737-400
IATA	ICAO	Call sign
RN	RKT	BLUE GREEN
- Founded: 2015
- Ceased operations: 2016
- Hubs: Kuala Lumpur International Airport
- Fleet size: 2
- Destinations: 6
- Headquarters: Shah Alam
- Website: www.rayaniair.com

Rayani Air Sdn. Bhd. (doing business as Rayani Air; Jawi: راياني أير, Tamil: ரயாணி ஏர்) was a full-service airline in Malaysia, headquartered in Shah Alam, Selangor, in the Kuala Lumpur metropolitan area. It was the first Sharia-compliant airline in Malaysia and the fourth such airline in the world, after Royal Brunei Airlines (RBA), Saudi Arabian Airlines and Iran Air. No alcoholic beverages or pork were served on board in accordance with Islamic dietary laws and prayers were recited before every flight. It was forced to cease operations after only five months due to management, safety and security issues, pilot strikes, and lack of funding.

== History ==
Rayani Air was founded by Ravi Alagendrran and his wife Karthiyani Govindan, both of Malaysian Indian descent. The name Rayani is said to be a combination of the first names of the founders.

Rayani Airlines was originally intended to be based at Malacca International Airport, with its inaugural flight expected to take place in August 2014. However, the airline changed its base to Langkawi International Airport to attract tourists to the resort island. It was previously rumoured that Rayani Air would be launched as a low-cost carrier; however, the airline officially positioned itself as a full-service carrier in December 2015.

On 20 December 2015, the airline's inaugural flight to Langkawi (RN600) took off smoothly.

The airline was planning to co-operate with Royal Brunei Airlines to strengthen the Sharia-compliant airline concept within the aviation industry.

In March 2016, Rayani Air faced several issues and numerous complaints, highlighted in several media outlets. Passengers complained that the airline frequently rescheduled flights, often up to 13 hours later. The airline also frequently cancelled flights without advance notice and without compensation or assistance to affected passengers. It was reported that pilots refused to fly because of the poor condition of the aircraft.

On 9 April 2016, Rayani Air temporarily suspended all operations until further notice, citing 'restructuring exercises' in an announcement made by its co-founder.

Politician Lau Weng San criticised the airline for using handwritten boarding passes, posing a security threat to the aviation industry. This led the Minister of Transport Liow Tiong Lai to state that the airline would be investigated and suspended if necessary. On 11 April 2016, Rayani Air was officially suspended for 3 months.

The Malaysian Aviation Commission (Mavcom) announced in a statement on 13 June 2016 that Rayani Air's licence had been revoked, saying it had breached the conditions of its licence and lacked the financial and management capacity to continue operating as a commercial airline.

== Destinations ==
- Kuala Lumpur - Kuala Lumpur International Airport (Main Hub)
- Langkawi – Langkawi International Airport
- Kota Bharu – Sultan Ismail Petra Airport
- Kuching – Kuching International Airport
- Kota Kinabalu – Kota Kinabalu International Airport

== Fleet ==
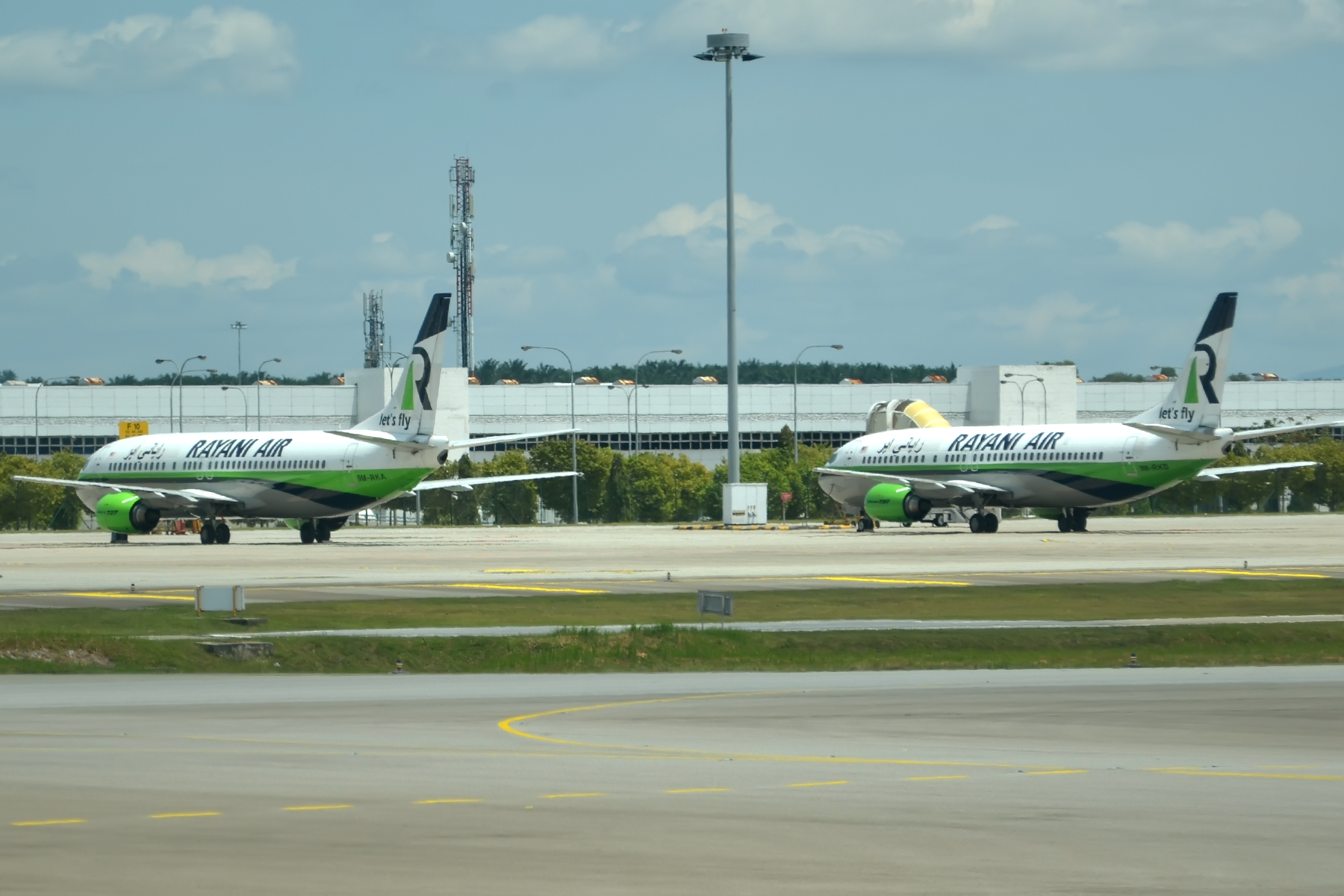
Two Rayani Air Boeing 737-400

Before ceasing operations, the airline's fleet consisted of two Boeing 737-400 aircraft, with the following on order: two more Boeing 737-400s, four Boeing 737-800s and two Boeing 777-200s.
