= Mango (airline) =

Low-cost airline of South Africa (2006–2021)

Mango Airlines
IATA	ICAO	Call sign
JE	MNO	TULCA
- Founded: 30 October 2006
- Ceased operations: July 2021 (operations); August 2022 (license suspended)
- Hubs: O. R. Tambo International Airport
- Focus cities: Cape Town International Airport
- Frequent-flyer program: Voyager
- Fleet size: 16
- Destinations: 9
- Headquarters: Kempton Park, Gauteng, South Africa
- Key people: William Ndlovu CEO
- Employees: ±750
- Website: www.flymango.com

Mango Airlines SOC Ltd, trading as Mango, was a South African low-cost airline based at O. R. Tambo International Airport, and a subsidiary of South African Airways. Since July 2021, the airline had been grounded, as funding for its business rescue was subject to a dispute. However, in August 2022, its license was suspended altogether.

On 6 of June 2025, Mango announced its comeback via their flymango website that those who have unflown tickets can visit their portal and claim them. This comes after a potential investor promised to join hands with Mango owners SAA.

== History ==
Mango was launched on 30 October 2006, with bookings going on sale at midnight on the same date. Mango's first flight took place on 15 November 2006. Mango planned to join Star Alliance as a Connecting Partner in the third quarter of 2016, but the plan has been put on hold due to South African Airways' financial state.

Mango was grounded due to non-payments and debt to ACSA (Airports Company of South Africa) on 28 April 2021. No Mango airliners were allowed to either depart or land at any ACSA airport in South Africa as of 28 April 2021. Only a statement of apology was issued by the company. As of then, it was to be seen if any money from government which was granted to South African Airways (of which Mango is a subsidiary) was to be allocated to Mango as a bailout. However it never resumed operations and in August 2022, the South African authorities suspended the airlines license altogether for at least two years.

On 6 September 2023, the Gauteng High Court ruled that the Minister of Public Enterprises must make decision within 30 days regarding the sale of Mango.

== Corporate affairs ==
=== Ownership ===
Mango was 100% owned by South African Airways, which is itself owned by the government of South Africa, but Mango operates independently as a low-cost airline with its own Board and balance sheet.

=== Head office ===
Mango's head office was at OR Tambo International Airport in Kempton Park, Ekurhuleni, Gauteng, on the mezzanine level of the Domestic Departure Terminal.

=== Business trends ===
Financial and operational figures for Mango were fully incorporated within the SAA Group figures. Not all the results in the Group reports are broken down to subsidiary level, however, and therefore some figures below are from press reports. As of March 2020, no results for Mango have been released for 2018 and 2019 because SAA has not itself released its Group results. (Figures below as at year ending 31 March:)

-	2008	2009	2010	2011	2012	2013	2014	2015	2016	2017
Turnover (Rm)						1,360	1,942	2,200	2,300	2,143
Net Profit/Loss before tax (Rm)							40.3	38.0	−36.9	
Net Profit/Loss after tax (Rm)	loss	10.9	13.7	0.3	c. −92.8	39.1	−16.1			12.5
Number of passengers (m)	1.5	1.3	1.3	1.4	1.6	1.8	2.3	2.5	3.0	2.9
Passenger load factor (%)		86			77	81.3	82.4		81.0	83.2
Number of staff (at year end)							598			713
Number of aircraft (at year end)	4	4	4	5	7	6	8	9	10	10
Notes/sources										

== Destinations ==
Before having all of its flights grounded on 28 April 2021, Mango served the following destinations:

Country	City	Airport	Notes
South Africa	Bloemfontein	Bram Fischer International Airport	
South Africa	Cape Town	Cape Town International Airport	Focus city
South Africa	Durban	King Shaka International Airport	
South Africa	East London	East London Airport	
South Africa	George	George Airport	
South Africa	Gqeberha	Chief Dawid Stuurman International Airport	
South Africa	Johannesburg	O. R. Tambo International Airport	Hub
Tanzania	Zanzibar	Zanzibar International Airport	

== Fleet ==
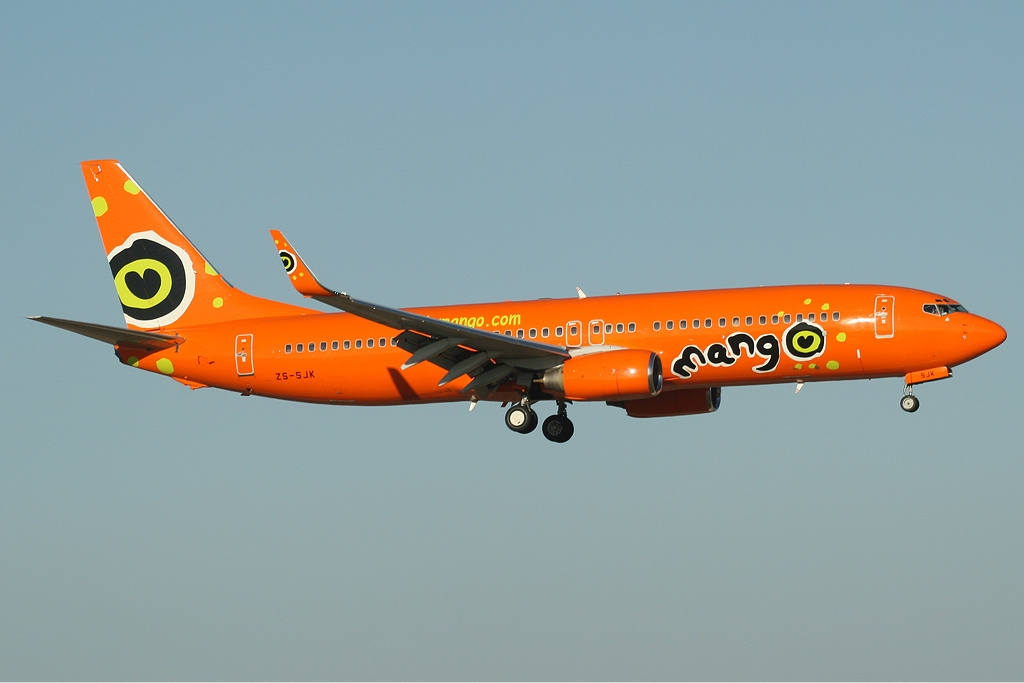
A Mango Airlines Boeing 737-800

As of July 2021, the Mango fleet consisted of the following aircraft:

Mango Fleet
Aircraft	In Fleet	Introduced	Retired	Passengers	Notes
Boeing 737-300	1	2015	2016	148	
Boeing 737-300	1	2017	2019	148	
Boeing 737-800	4	2006	2020	186	
Boeing 737-800	1	2011	2020	186	
Boeing 737-800	1	2012	2020	186	
Boeing 737-800	2	2013	2020	186	
Boeing 737-800	1	2014	2021	186	
Boeing 737-800	3	2015	2021	186	
Boeing 737-800	4	2018	2021	186	
Airbus A320-200	1	2018	2019	180	
Total	19				

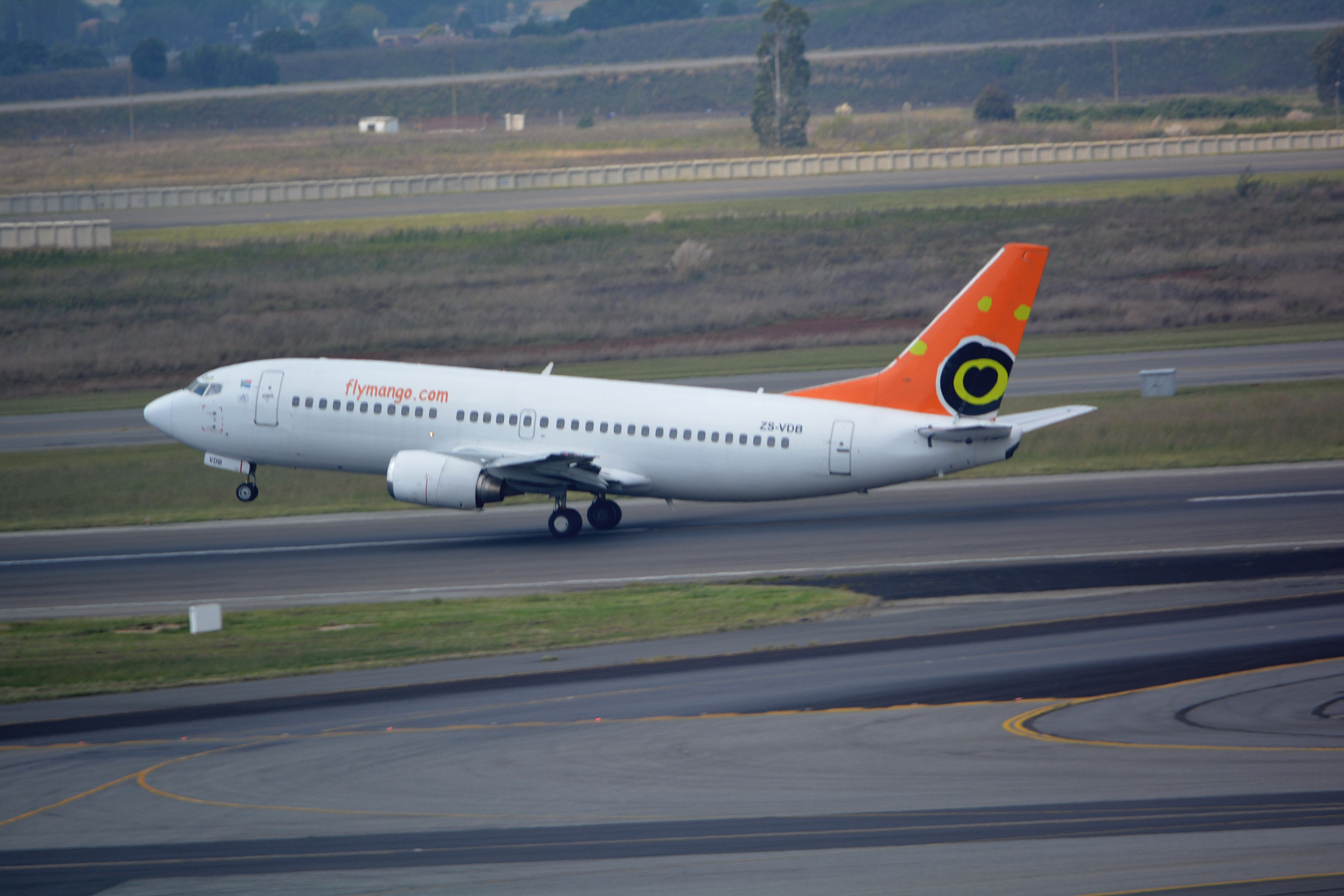
A Mango Airlines Boeing 737-31L taking off at Tambo Johannesburg International-JNB

== Services ==
=== In-flight services ===
As a low-cost airline, Mango featured a uniform fleet of aircraft with high seating density. Mango also offered online ticketing. A standard booking did not include food and drinks. Mango offered a buy on board programme offering food and drinks for purchase.

Mango provided an in-flight magazine Mango Juice and used to offer Mango TV, a former daily in flight entertainment programme viewable on the drop-down televisions placed throughout the aircraft. In-flight Wi-Fi was also available on all flights for a fee. Wi-Fi services were provided by G-Connect, a local internet broadband provider.

=== Frequent-flyer program ===
South African Airways Voyager members could redeem SAA Voyager miles with Mango, but were not yet able to earn SAA Voyager miles with Mango. No other SAA Voyager benefits, such as additional baggage, upgrades or lounge access, were applicable when using SAA Voyager miles to pay for a Mango flight.

== See also ==
- Kulula.com, another defunct South African low-cost airline
