= Night flying restrictions =

Regulations imposed to prevent aircraft noise

Night flying restrictions or night-time curfews, including night flight bans, are any regulations or legislation imposed by a governing body to limit the ground-perceived exposure to aircraft noise pollution during the night hours, when the majority of residents are trying to sleep. Such regulations may include restrictions to available flight paths, or prohibitions against takeoffs, or prohibitions against takeoffs and landings, or prohibitions against ground operations (engine runups or taxiing).

== List ==
=== Europe ===
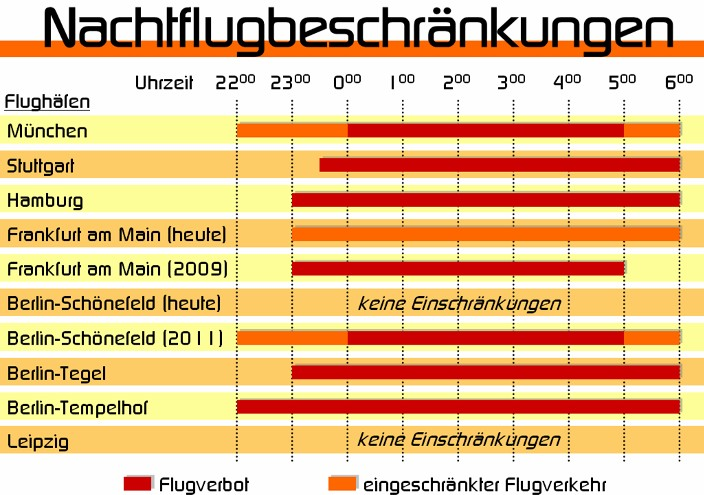
Example: Night flying restrictions at German airports, data from 2006

Several night flying restrictions including full night flight bans have been introduced in Europe in order to ensure that residents living near airports can sleep at night.

- Budapest Ferenc Liszt International Airport, Hungary: A night flight ban between midnight and 05:00 was introduced in August 2019 by agreement between the city of Budapest and the Ministry of Transport. Nearby residents received a government subsidy to install soundproof windows.
- Cologne Bonn Airport, Germany: In April 2012, the Government of North Rhine-Westphalia introduced a night flight ban for passenger aircraft from midnight until 05:00.
- Frankfurt Airport, Germany: In October 2011, the Supreme Court of Hesse imposed a ban on night flights between 23:00 and 05:00. This decision was upheld by the Federal Administrative Court in Leipzig in April 2012. During the morning and evening periods (22:00–23:00 and 05:00–06:00) a limited number of flights are allowed, providing they comply with ICAO Chapter 4 noise regulations. Further restrictions apply to noisier aircraft.
- London airports: The night restrictions for Heathrow, Gatwick and Stansted define a night period, 23:00–07:00, and a night quota period, 23:30–06:00. During the night period, the noisiest types of aircraft (classified as QC/4, QC/8 or QC/16 under the Quota Count system) may not be scheduled to land or to take off (other than in the most exceptional circumstances, such as an emergency landing). In addition, during the night quota period movements by most other types of aircraft (including the new QC/0.25 category) will be restricted by a movements limit and a noise quota, which are set for each season.
- Zurich Airport, Switzerland: A strict night-time curfew has been in force since 29 July 2010 between 23:30 and 06:00; the time between 23:00 and 23:30 may only be used to reduce backlogs of delayed flights.

=== Oceania ===
Curfews are not as common at international airports in Oceania as they are in Europe, though some airports do still have curfews if they surround densely populated suburbs.

==== Australia ====
Curfews at Australian international airports
Airport	State/territory	Curfew?	Notes
Adelaide	South Australia	Yes (23:00 to 06:00)	
Brisbane	Queensland	No	Curfew proposed, objected to by airport.
Cairns	Queensland	No	
Canberra	Australian Capital Territory	No	
Darwin International Airport	Northern Territory	No	
Gold Coast	Queensland	Yes (23:00 to 06:00)	
Hobart	Tasmania	No	
Melbourne	Victoria	No	
Newcastle	New South Wales	Yes (22:00 to 06:00)	
Perth	Western Australia	No	Curfew previously proposed, rejected multiple times.
Sunshine Coast	Queensland	No	While there is no curfew at Sunshine Coast Airport, approval is required for aircraft to take off or land at the airport from 23:00 and 05:30.
Sydney (Kingsford-Smith)	New South Wales	Yes (23:00 to 06:00)	Despite being the busiest airport in Oceania and a hub for the Asia-Pacific region, Sydney Airport has a late night curfew due to its location in the densely populated suburb of Mascot.
Western Sydney	New South Wales	No	Western Sydney Airport is currently under construction. However, due to its location away from densely populated suburbs, it will not have a curfew, unlike Sydney Airport.

==== New Zealand ====
Curfews at New Zealand international airports
Airport	Curfew?	Notes
Auckland	No	
Christchurch	No	
Queenstown	Yes (22:00 to 07:00)	
Wellington	Yes (00:00 to 06:00)	International arrivals allowed until 01:00.

== See also ==
- Short-haul flight ban
