= Norse Atlantic Airways =

Low-cost, long-haul airline of Norway

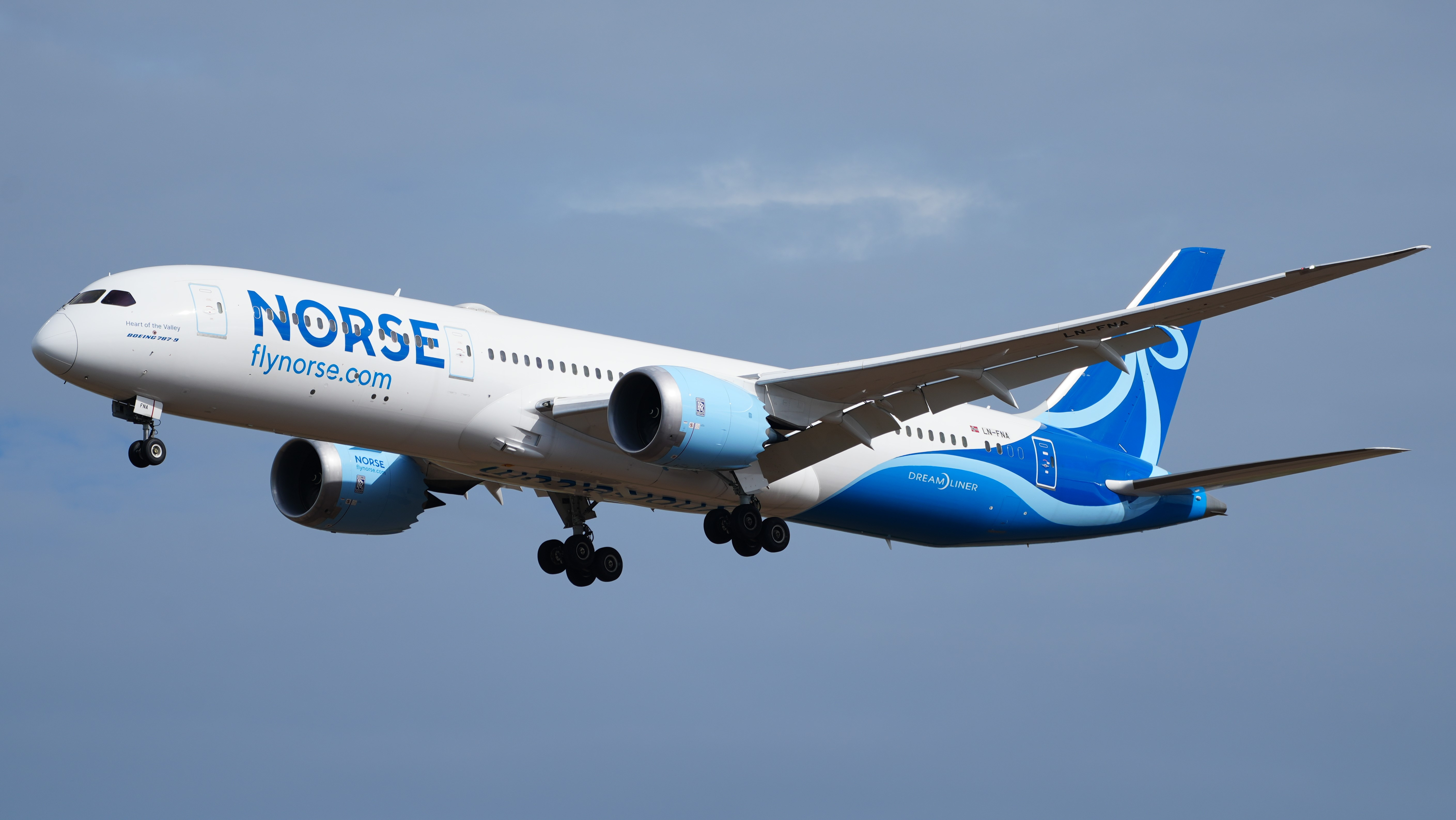
- Norse Atlantic Airways Boeing 787-9
IATA	ICAO	Call sign
N0	NBT	LONGSHIP
- Founded: February 2021; 5 years ago
- Commenced operations: 14 June 2022; 4 years ago
- AOC #: NO.AOC.093
- Operating bases: London–Gatwick; New York–JFK; Oslo; Paris–Charles de Gaulle
- Subsidiaries: Norse Atlantic UK
- Fleet size: 12 (including subsidiary)
- Destinations: 14
- Traded as: OSE: NORSE
- Headquarters: Arendal, Norway
- Key people: Bjørn Tore Larsen (Founder and chairman); Eivind Roald (CEO and president)
- Revenue: ▲US$734 million (2025)
- Net income: ▲US$-61.9 million (2025)
- Total assets: ▼US$913 million (2025)
- Total equity: ▼US$-260 million (2025)
- Website: www.flynorse.com

Norse Atlantic Airways AS is a Norwegian low-cost, long-haul airline headquartered in Arendal, Norway. Founded in February 2021, the airline operates a fleet of Boeing 787 aircraft between Europe, North America, Africa and Asia.

== History ==
=== Establishment ===
Norse Atlantic Airways was founded in February 2021. At its establishment, the airline was 63% owned by CEO Bjørn Tore Larsen and affiliates, 15% owned by Bjørn Kjos, and 12% by Bjørn Kise.

The company raised 1.275 billion Norwegian kroner (US$150 million) in a private placement in March 2021.

Also in March 2021, the company leased its first nine Boeing 787s, consisting of three 787-8s and six 787-9s, from AerCap.

In April 2021, the company became a public company via an initial public offering on the Oslo stock market, raising 1.4 billion Norwegian kroner (US$165 million). Following the parent company's listing on the Oslo Stock Exchange, Bjørn Tore Larsen remained the majority shareholder with a 12.4% stake, followed by institutional investors such as Delphi Nordic (6.7%), DNB SMB (6.3%), and Skagen Vekst (5.9%).

The Norse Atlantic executives had previously worked for Norwegian Air Shuttle or its contractors. The choice of destinations was similar, and the Boeing 787 airframes it leased were previously operated by Norwegian, with the planes to retain the same seating configuration when operated by Norse Atlantic.

In March 2021, United States congressman Peter DeFazio urged in a statement that a foreign air carrier permit be denied to Norse Atlantic, on the basis of detrimental effects caused by the 2016 issuing of a foreign air carrier permit to Norwegian Air International, claiming the company had circumvented Norway's labor protections through Irish incorporation. In response to the allegations, Norse Atlantic CEO Bjørn Tore Larsen stated that the airline is an independent Norwegian company and had planned to have permanent employees based in the United States.

In May 2021, the airline reached agreements with unions representing flight attendants including those based in the United States, prior to their employment.

In August 2021, Norse Atlantic Airways secured leasing rights for a further six Boeing 787-9s from BOC Aviation, increasing its planned fleet from 12 to 15 aircraft, with deliveries in 2021 and 2022.

In August 2021, the airline updated its corporate image and aircraft livery.

The British Airline Pilots Association signed a collective agreement with the airline in September 2021.

The launch of operations was postponed from December 2021 to the summer of 2022 due to the decline in travel during the COVID-19 pandemic. The start of ticket sales was planned to take place approximately three months prior to launch.

In September 2021, the airline submitted its application to the United States Department of Transportation (USDOT) for a foreign air carrier permit, outlining the operation of flights from Oslo to Fort Lauderdale, Newburgh, and Ontario airports.

In November 2021, the airline was allocated airport slots at London Stansted Airport.

In December 2021, the airline's first Boeing 787-9 was ferried to Oslo ahead of its planned spring 2022 launch of operations.

Also in December 2021, the airline was granted its AOC by the Civil Aviation Authority of Norway.

In January 2022, the airline received approval from the United States Department of Transportation to operate scheduled and chartered service between Europe and the USA.

In March 2022, the airline was allocated airport slots at Gatwick Airport.

In April 2022, the airline received its approval for its foreign air carrier permit from the United States Department of Transportation.

=== Launch of operations ===
Norse Atlantic Airways opened reservations and announced its initial route network in April 2022.

Its inaugural flight took place on 14 June 2022 from Oslo Airport, Gardermoen to John F. Kennedy International Airport in New York City.

=== Partnerships and layoffs ===
In July 2022, Norse Atlantic launched its first partnerships with other airlines, consisting of easyJet, Norwegian Air Shuttle, and Spirit Airlines to provide connecting traffic between the airlines through services provided by Dohop.

In 2025, the airline relocated key administrative and operational functions to Riga, Latvia.

In May 2026, the airline cut 75 administrative positions, or 35% of its total administrative positions, mainly at its headquarters, as part of a restructuring aimed at reducing costs and aligning with a new business model focused on ACMI and charter flights.

== Corporate affairs ==
=== Management ===
Bjørn Tore Larsen is the founder and chairman of the board of Norse Atlantic Airways. He was its first CEO, having previously served as chairman of OSM Aviation. Charles Duncan was the company's president for a term in 2023, with prior experience at Continental Airlines, United Airlines, WestJet, and Swoop. He now serves as executive advisor.

In November 2025, Eivind Roald was appointed President and CEO, he previously worked as chief commercial officer with SAS.

=== Organizational structure ===
Norse Atlantic is headquartered in Arendal, Norway, and is wholly owned by Norse Atlantic ASA. As of July 2026, Norse Atlantic ASA was 28% owned by an affiliate of CEO Bjørn Tore Larsen.

Norse Atlantic also established Norse Atlantic UK as a British subsidiary on 10 May 2021.

The company received a British AOC and operating licence on 28 September 2022.

In early 2025, the airline established a control center in Riga, Latvia.

=== Branding ===
Norse Atlantic's corporate logo is inspired by the Oseberg Ship, with the aircraft livery and branding inspired by the longships used by the Vikings to cross the North Atlantic.

The airline's branding was designed by Markus Lock.

Its aircraft are named after national parks in countries served by the airline, such as Raet, Everglades, Dartmoor, and Yellowstone National Park.

== Destinations ==
Countries in which Norse Atlantic Airways operates

=== Route launches and cutbacks ===
Norse Atlantic Airways began operations with transatlantic flights between destinations in North America and Europe, before expanding to Asia. In March 2021, the airline announced London, Oslo, and Paris in Europe, alongside Los Angeles, Miami, and New York City in the United States as its planned initial destination cities.

The airline announced its second European destination outside of Oslo in June 2022, with flights from Berlin to both New York JFK and Los Angeles, respectively in August 2022.

Starting in October 2022, its Los Angeles and Orlando routes became seasonal.

In November 2022, Norse Atlantic announced the addition of both Paris Charles de Gaulle and Rome Fiumicino as destinations to launch in March and June 2023 respectively.

In February 2023, the airline announced the launch of flights operated by its British subsidiary Norse Atlantic UK, with services between London Gatwick and Orlando and Fort Lauderdale. Flights were launched in March 2023 as Norse Atlantic UK took over the operation of Norse Atlantic's route between London Gatwick and New York JFK.

In May 2023, the airline announced its first services in Asia and the Caribbean, with services between London Gatwick and Barbados, Kingston, and Montego Bay to launch in October 2023, and services between Oslo and Bangkok to begin in November 2023, however the services to the Caribbean were delayed until December 2023, with the planned Kingston service ultimately cancelled.

In December 2023, Norse Atlantic announced that it would expand operations to Greece, with services between New York JFK and Athens to begin in May 2024.

In March 2024, Norse Atlantic announced that it would expand services between London Gatwick and Las Vegas to begin in September 2024.

In October 2024, the airline announced a new service between Rome Fiumicino and Los Angeles beginning in May 2025.

In April 2025, the airline announced widespread cuts to its routes to the United States due to severely decreasing passenger traffic, consisting of frequency cuts to various routes, and with services from Athens, Berlin and Paris to New York cut seasonally.

In May 2025, the airline announced a new route between Athens and Los Angeles from 3 June 2025, notably the first nonstop service between Athens and the west coast of the United States.

In August 2025, the airline renewed its charter deal with P&O Cruises to fly passengers to cruise ships in the Caribbean.

Effective October 2026, Norse cut all routes to/from the United States, except for a route between Gatwick Airport and Orlando.

=== List of destinations ===
The following table lists the collective current and former scheduled and charter destinations of the airline and its subsidiary as of November 2024, but does not include destinations operated on behalf of other airlines via aircraft lease agreements:

Country	City	Airport	Start date	End date	Notes	Refs
Antigua and Barbuda	St. John's	V. C. Bird International Airport	8 November 2024	8 March 2025	Terminated	
Barbados	Bridgetown	Grantley Adams International Airport	1 December 2023; 1 November 2024	13 April 2024; Present	Seasonal charter	
France	Paris	Charles de Gaulle Airport	26 March 2023	14 April 2026	Terminated	
Germany	Berlin	Berlin Brandenburg Airport	17 August 2022	26 September 2025	Terminated	
Greece	Athens	Athens International Airport	30 May 2024	Present	Seasonal	
Italy	Rome	Rome Fiumicino Airport	19 June 2023	Present	Seasonal	
Jamaica	Montego Bay	Sangster International Airport	1 December 2023	12 April 2024	Terminated	
Norway	Oslo	Oslo Airport, Gardermoen	14 June 2022	Present	Base	
South Africa	Cape Town	Cape Town International Airport	28 October 2024	Present	Seasonal	
Sweden	Stockholm	Stockholm Arlanda Airport	28 October 2025	Present	Seasonal	
Thailand	Bangkok	Suvarnabhumi Airport	2 November 2023	Present		
Thailand	Phuket	Phuket International Airport	4 December 2025	Present	Seasonal	
United Kingdom	London	Gatwick Airport	12 August 2022	Present	Base	
United Kingdom	Manchester	Manchester Airport	1 November 2024	Present	Seasonal	
United States	Boston	Logan International Airport	2 September 2023	28 October 2023	Terminated	
United States	Fort Lauderdale	Fort Lauderdale–Hollywood International Airport	18 June 2022	17 September 2023	Terminated	
United States	Las Vegas	Harry Reid International Airport	12 September 2024	31 March 2025	Terminated	
United States	Los Angeles	Los Angeles International Airport	9 August 2022	14 April 2026	Terminated	
United States	Miami	Miami International Airport	18 September 2023	25 October 2025	Terminated	
United States	New York City	John F. Kennedy International Airport	14 June 2022	24 October 2026	Base	
United States	Orlando	Orlando International Airport	5 July 2022	Present		
United States	San Francisco	San Francisco International Airport	1 July 2023	28 October 2023	Terminated	
United States	Washington, D.C.	Dulles International Airport	1 June 2023	28 October 2023	Terminated	

=== Interline agreements ===
Norse Atlantic Airways maintains virtual interlining agreements with the following airlines:

- Aegean Airlines
- Air Mauritius
- Alaska Airlines
- APG Airlines
- Avianca
- easyJet
- FlySafair
- Hawaiian Airlines
- Norwegian Air Shuttle
- Pegasus Airlines
- Thai VietJet Air

== Fleet ==
=== Current fleet ===
As of August 2026, Norse Atlantic Airways and its subsidiary operate an all-Boeing 787-9 fleet composed of the following aircraft:

Norse Atlantic Airways fleet
Aircraft	In service	Orders	Passengers			Notes
Aircraft	In service	Orders	W	Y	Total	Notes
Boeing 787-9	12	—	56	282	338	4 operated by Norse Atlantic UK. 2 wet-leased to Pakistan International Airlines.
Total	12	—				

=== Fleet development ===
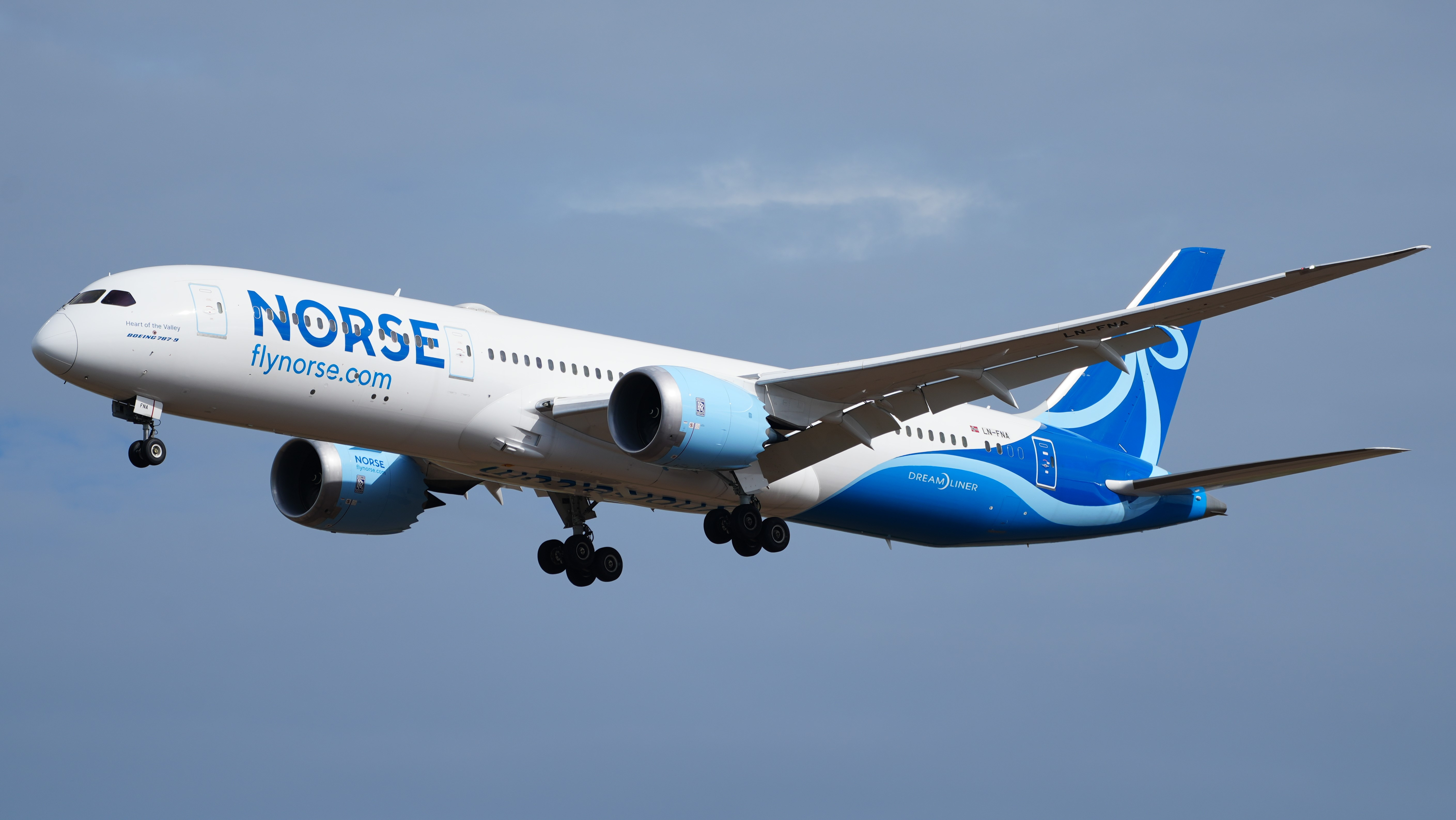
Norse Atlantic Airways Boeing 787-9

In March 2021, Norse Atlantic secured leasing rights for its first nine aircraft, consisting of three 787-8s and 6 787-9s from AerCap.

In August 2021, the airline leased an additional six 787-9s from BOC Aviation, increasing its total planned fleet to 15 787s.

Norse Atlantic received its first 787-9 in December 2021.

In April 2022, the airline announced it would lease two 787-8s and two 787-9s to Air Europa for 18 months while Norse Atlantic would undergo its initial startup operations.

In October 2022, Norse Atlantic received 13 of its 15 aircraft. It also leased out a third 787-8.

In October 2022, lessor BOC Aviation delivered its sixth 787-9 to Norse Atlantic.

In February 2024, Norse Atlantic extended the term for four subleased Boeing 787 aircraft.

In August 2024, Norse Atlantic announced it would no longer operate the three remaining 787-8s it had leased out, instead focusing on its fleet of 787-9s.

Norse Atlantic leased one aircraft to TUI fly Nordic for the 2022 winter season.

Norse Atlantic leased one aircraft to Neos for the 2024 winter season.

It damp-leased up to six aircraft to IndiGo in 2025. In July 2026, IndiGo announced that the leased aircraft would conclude operations by 25 October 2026 and the agreement, where the cabin crew was provided by IndiGo and pilots and aircraft provided by Norse, would be terminated by 31 October. .

In October 2026, Norse Atlantic announced a deal with Pakistan International Airlines for the wetlease of two B787-9 aircraft starting from November 2026.

== Service concept ==
The cabins of Norse Atlantic's Boeing 787s retain the original seating configurations of their previous operators Norwegian Air Shuttle and its associated subsidiaries, and are thus configured in two classes of service, consisting of Premium and Economy classes.

Seats in its Premium cabin are configured in a 2–3–2 layout, while its Economy seats are configured in a 3–3–3 layout. As a low-cost carrier, the airline charges fees for extra services and amenities depending on class of service. Seats in both cabins are equipped with an in-flight entertainment system allowing playback of video on demand through personal screens,

In-flight Wi-Fi was planned in August 2021 but never implemented.

== Financials ==
For 2022, the airline reported losses of 1.27 billion Norwegian kroner (US$123 million).

The company raised US$14.2 million from a new share issue in April 2023.

In its first year, the airline carried over 500,000 passengers.

In Q2 2023, the airline achieved a positive EBITDAR for the first time and a load factor of 82% and 85% in June and July.

In Q3 2023, the company made its first quarterly net profit of US$1.6 million.

== See also ==
- List of airlines of Norway
