= Gatwick Airport =

International airport in West Sussex, England

London Gatwick Airport

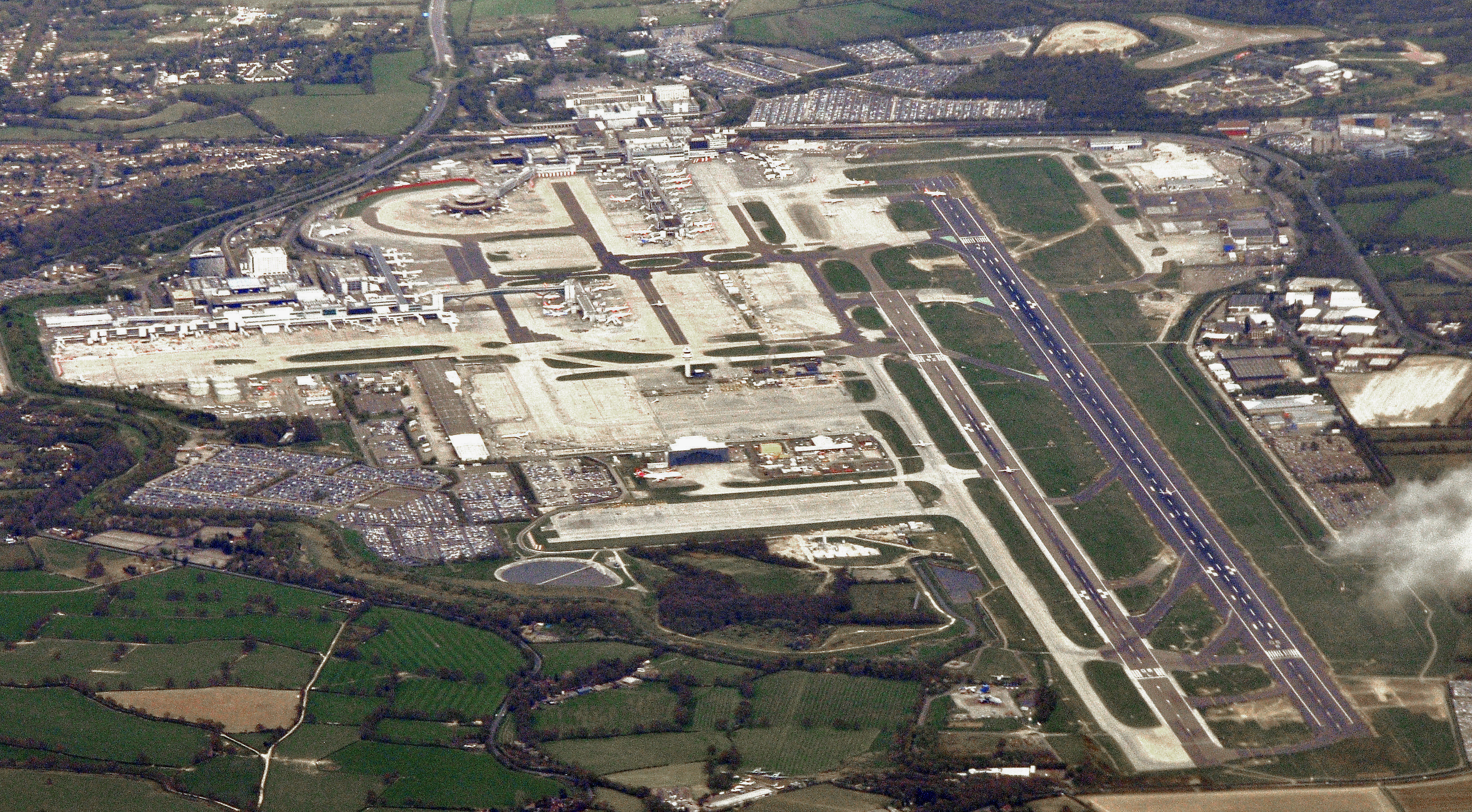
- IATA: LGW; ICAO: EGKK; WMO: 03776

Summary
- Airport type: Public
- Owner/Operator: Gatwick Airport Limited
- Serves: London, South East England
- Location: Crawley, West Sussex, England
- Opened: 30 May 1958; 68 years ago
- Hub for: British Airways
- Operating base for: BA EuroFlyer; easyJet UK; Jet2.com; Norse Atlantic UK; TUI Airways; Vueling; Wizz Air UK
- Built: Beehive terminal: November 1928; 98 years ago South terminal: 30 May 1958; 68 years ago North terminal: March 1988; 38 years ago
- Elevation AMSL: 203 ft (62 m)
- Coordinates: 51°08′53″N 0°11′25″W
- Website: gatwickairport.com

Map
- Location in West Sussex Location in England

Runways
Direction	Length		Surface
Direction	m	ft	Surface
08L/26R (Note: Gatwick has two runways; however, their proximity prevents simultaneous operation, so only a single runway is in operation at any time.)	2,565	8,415	Asphalt
08R/26L	3,316	10,879	Asphalt

Statistics (2024)
- Total passengers: 43,242,000
- Aircraft movements: 265,358
- Gates: 115 (in terminal)
- Sources: UK AIP at NATS. Statistics from CAA.

London Gatwick Airport (/ˈɡætwɪk/) (IATA: LGW, ICAO: EGKK) is one of several international airports serving Greater London and southern England. It is located in Crawley, in West Sussex, 30 miles (48 km; 26 nmi) south of Central London, England. In 2024, Gatwick was the second-busiest airport by total passenger traffic in the UK, after Heathrow, and was the tenth-busiest in Europe by total passenger traffic. It covers a total area of 674 hectares (1,670 acres).

Gatwick opened as an aerodrome in the late 1920s; it has been in use for commercial flights since 1933. The airport has two terminals: the North Terminal and the South Terminal, which cover areas of 98,000 m^{2} (1,050,000 sq ft; 117,000 sq yd) and 160,000 m^{2} (1,700,000 sq ft; 190,000 sq yd) respectively. It operates as a single-runway airport, using a main runway with a length of 3,316 metres (10,879 ft). A secondary runway is available but, due to its proximity to the main runway, can only be used if the main runway is not in use. In 2018, 46.1 million passengers passed through the airport, a 1.1% increase compared with 2017. Gatwick is the secondary London hub for British Airways and the largest operating base for low-cost carrier easyJet.

== History ==
=== Early years ===
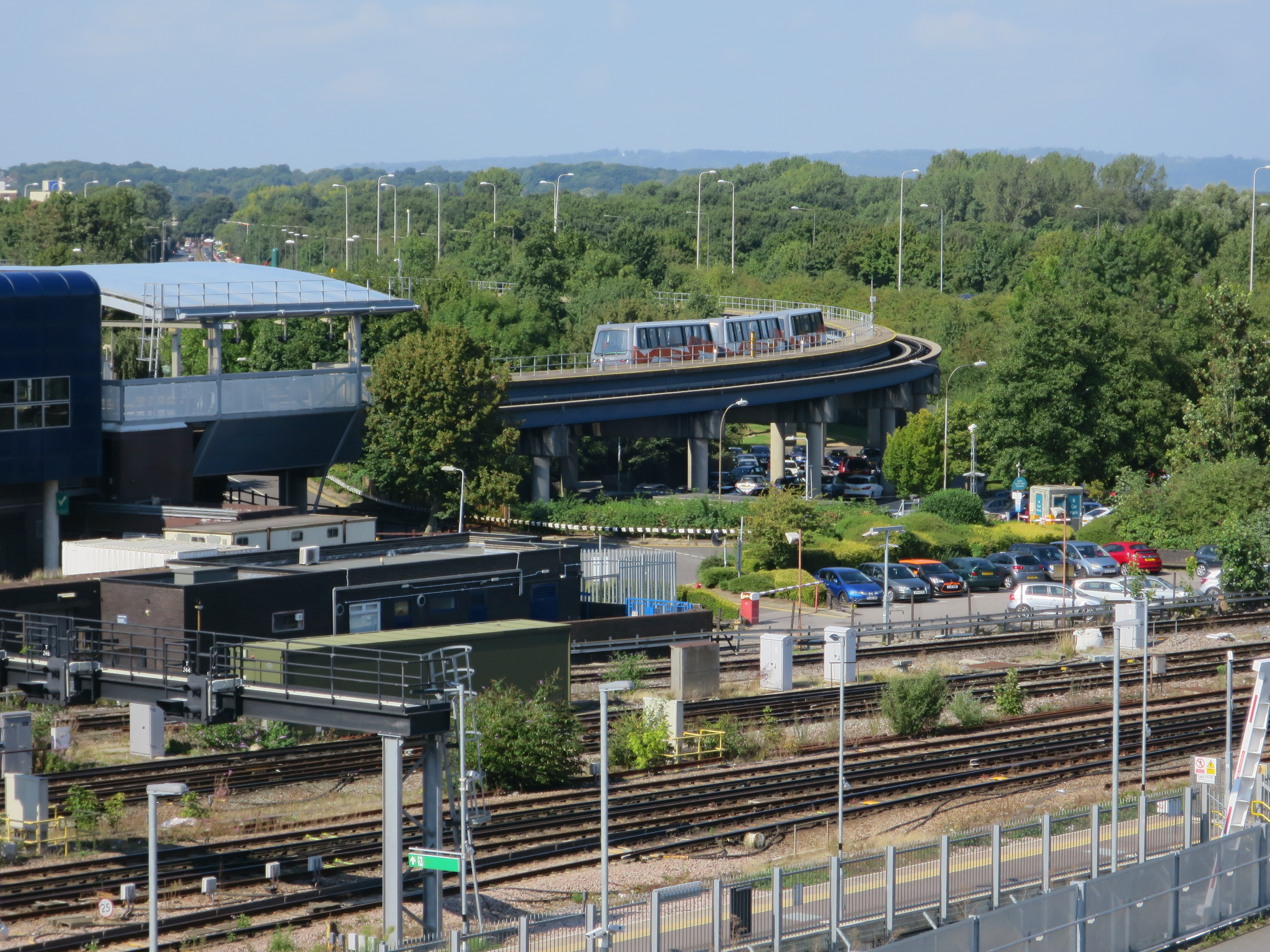
Gatwick railway station (Tinsley Green), pictured from above

A Dan Air de Havilland DH.106 Comet parked at the South Terminal and a British Caledonian Boeing 707 seen in the distance on a remote apron, early 1970s

Easyjet A320s and A319s parked at the North Terminal in the 2020s

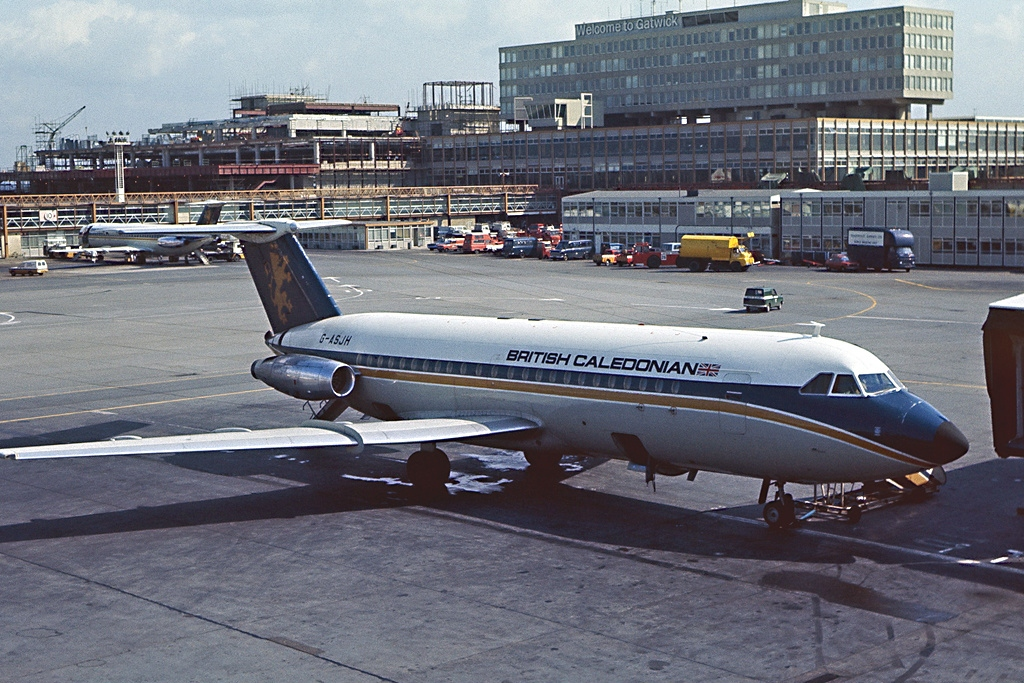
A BAC 1-11 with the main terminal building (now South Terminal) at Gatwick Airport in 1973

The land on which Gatwick Airport stands was first developed as an aerodrome in the late 1920s. The Air Ministry approved commercial flights from the site in 1933 and the first terminal, The Beehive, was built in 1935. Scheduled air services from the new terminal began the following year. During the Second World War, the airport was taken over by the military and was known as RAF Gatwick. After the war, the airport returned to its civilian capacity. The airport proper was built in the mid-1950s opening in 1956. The airport buildings were designed by Yorke Rosenberg Mardall between 1955 and 1988.

In the 1960s, British United Airways (BUA) and Dan-Air were two of the largest British independent (Note: independent from government-owned corporations) airlines at Gatwick, with the former establishing itself as the dominant scheduled operator at the airport as well as providing a significant number of the airport's non-scheduled services and the latter becoming its leading provider of inclusive tour charter services. Further rapid growth of charter flights at Gatwick was encouraged by the Ministry of Aviation, which instructed airlines to move regular charter flights from Heathrow. Following the takeover of BUA by Caledonian Airways at the beginning of the following decade, the resulting airline, British Caledonian (BCal), became Gatwick's dominant scheduled airline during the 1970s. While continuing to dominate scheduled operations at Gatwick for most of the 1980s, BCal was also one of the airport's major charter airlines until the end of the 1970s (together with Dan-Air, Laker Airways and British Airtours).

As a result of conditions imposed by Britain's Monopolies and Mergers Commission on the takeover of BCal by the then newly privatised British Airways (BA) at the end of the 1980s, Dan-Air and Air Europe assumed BCal's former role as Gatwick's dominant scheduled short-haul operator while BA continued in BCal's erstwhile role as the airport's most important scheduled long-haul operator. Following the demise of Air Europe and Dan-Air (both of which had continued to provide a significant number of charter flights in addition to a growing number of scheduled short-haul flights at Gatwick) in the early 1990s, BA (having purchased Dan-Air) began building up Gatwick into a secondary hub (complementing its main hub at Heathrow). These moves resulted in BA becoming Gatwick's dominant airline by the turn of the millennium. BA's subsequent decision to de-hub Gatwick provided the space for easyJet to establish its biggest base at the airport and become its dominant airline.

=== Transatlantic flights to the United States ===
From 1978 to 2008, many flights to and from the United States used Gatwick because of restrictions on the use of Heathrow implemented in the Bermuda II Agreement between the UK and the US. The EU–US Open Skies Agreement, which became effective on 30 March 2008, led several airlines to downsize their transatlantic operations at Gatwick in favour of Heathrow. Continental Airlines was the second transatlantic carrier (after American Airlines) to leave Gatwick after it decided to transfer the seasonal Cleveland service to Heathrow on 3 May 2009.

US Airways, Gatwick's last remaining US carrier, ended its service between Gatwick and Charlotte on 30 March 2013. This left Gatwick without a scheduled US airline for the first time in 35 years. Before the COVID-19 pandemic, Delta Air Lines announced its intent to launch service between Gatwick and Boston in the summer of 2020, which would have made it the first US airline to service Gatwick since the withdrawal of the US Airways service in 2013, but the massive global travel downturn placed these plans on indefinite hold. In 2021, JetBlue became the first US airline to serve Gatwick since 2013, with services to New York–JFK and Boston.

=== Development since the 2000s ===
On 17 September 2008, BAA announced it would sell Gatwick after the Competition Commission published a report about BAA's market dominance in London and the South East. On 21 October 2009, it was announced that an agreement had been reached to sell Gatwick to a consortium led by Global Infrastructure Partners (GIP), which subsequently also bought Edinburgh Airport in 2012, for £1.51 billion. The sale was completed on 3 December. In February 2010, GIP sold minority stakes in the airport of 12% and 15% to the South Korean National Pension Service and the Abu Dhabi Investment Authority (ADIA) for £100 million and £125 million, respectively. The sales were part of GIP's strategy to syndicate the equity portion of the original acquisition by issuing bonds to refinance bank debt. Although this entails bringing additional investors into the airport, GIP aims to retain management control.

The Californian state pension fund CalPERS acquired a 12.7% stake in Gatwick Airport for about US$155 million (£104.8 million) in June 2010. On 21 December 2010, the A$69 billion (£44 billion) Future Fund, a sovereign wealth fund established by the Australian government in 2006, agreed to purchase a 17.2% stake in Gatwick Airport from GIP for £145 million. This transaction completed GIP's syndication process for the airport, reducing its stake to 42% (although the firm's extra voting rights meant it still controlled the airport's board).

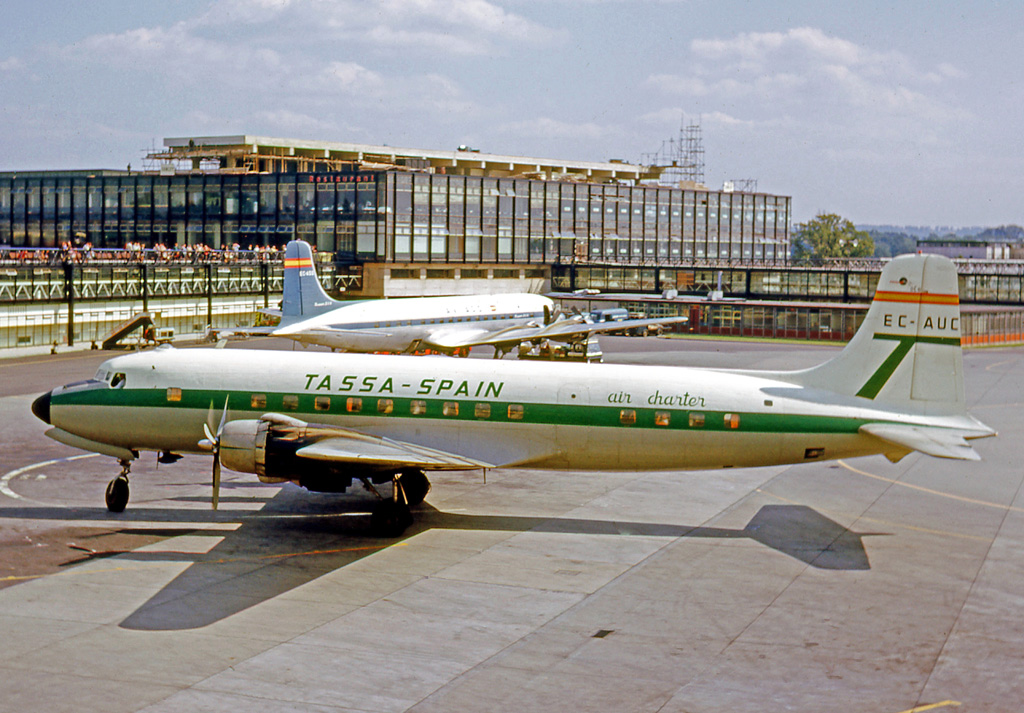
A Douglas DC-6 in front of the then-new terminal at Gatwick Airport in 1964

In August 2020, the airport announced plans to cut over a quarter of its employees as a result of a planned company restructuring caused by the effects of the COVID-19 pandemic. The planned cuts will bring the total workforce of the airport to 1,900; before the start of the pandemic it was 3,300, however, an additional 785 jobs were cut earlier in 2020. In August 2021, it was reported that Gatwick's operators were in talks with lenders following posting first-half-year net losses of £ 245m.

== Corporate affairs ==
=== Ownership ===
The former BAA Limited (now Heathrow Airport Holdings) and its predecessors, BAA plc and the British Airports Authority, owned and operated Gatwick from 1 April 1966 to 2 December 2009. The airport is owned and operated by Gatwick Airport Limited, a wholly owned subsidiary of Ivy Holdco Limited, owned by Global Infrastructure Partners (GIP), itself owned by BlackRock. In December 2018, Vinci announced that it would acquire a 50.01% majority stake for £2.9bn, with a GIP-managed consortium of investors (Abu Dhabi Investment Authority, Australia's sovereign wealth fund and two public pension funds in California and South Korea) owning the remaining 49.9%. The sale was completed by the middle of 2019.

=== Leadership ===
In September 2023, Baroness Ford was announced as the new chair of Gatwick Airport.

== Operations ==
=== Facilities ===
Airport map (as of 2024)

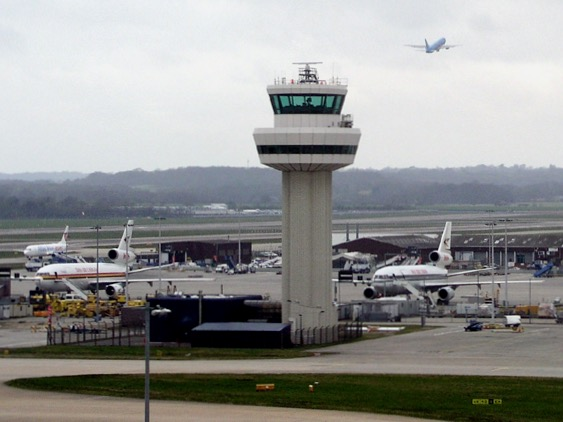
The airport control tower opened in 1984.

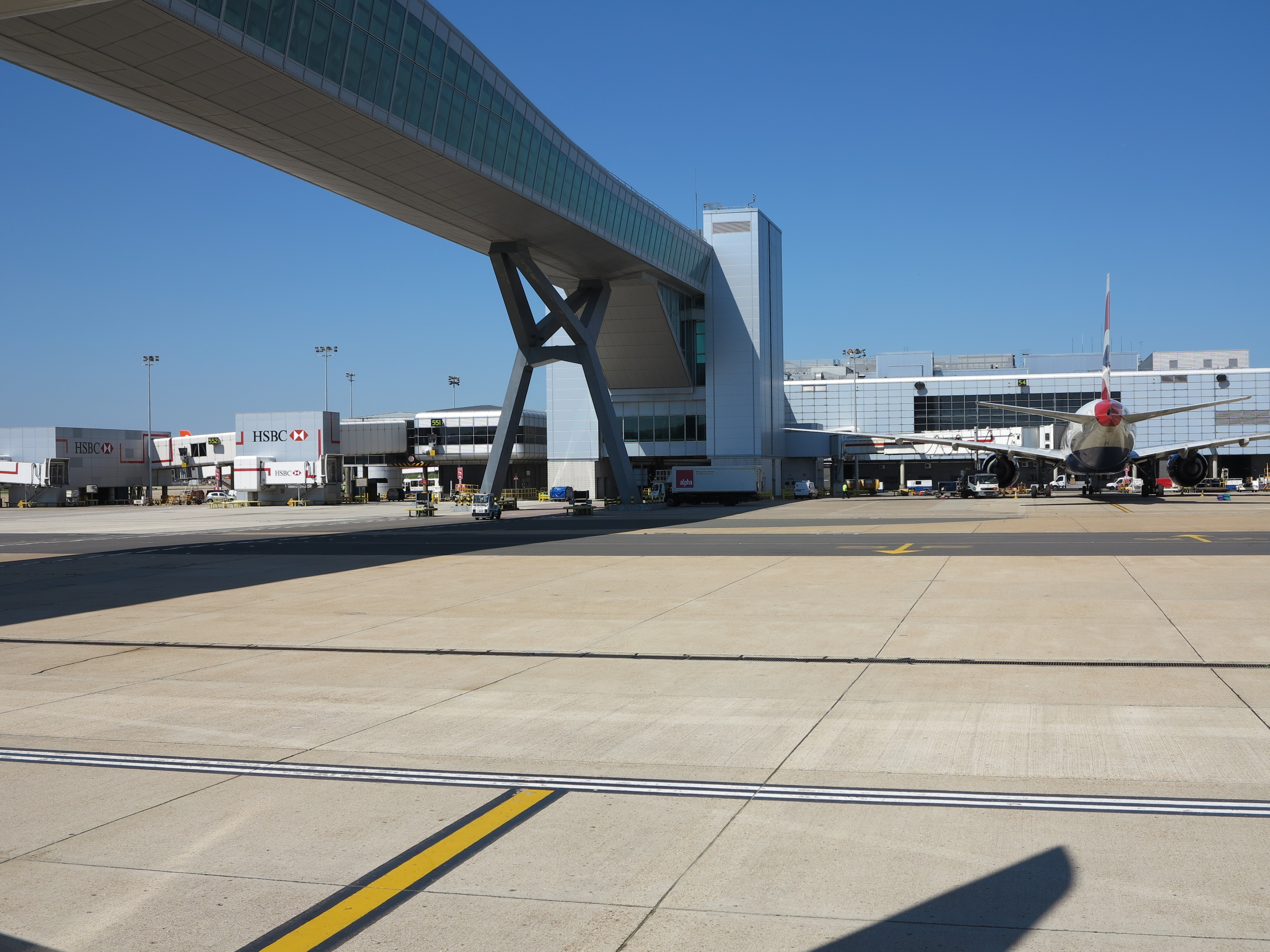
The bridge connecting the North Terminal to its apron pier

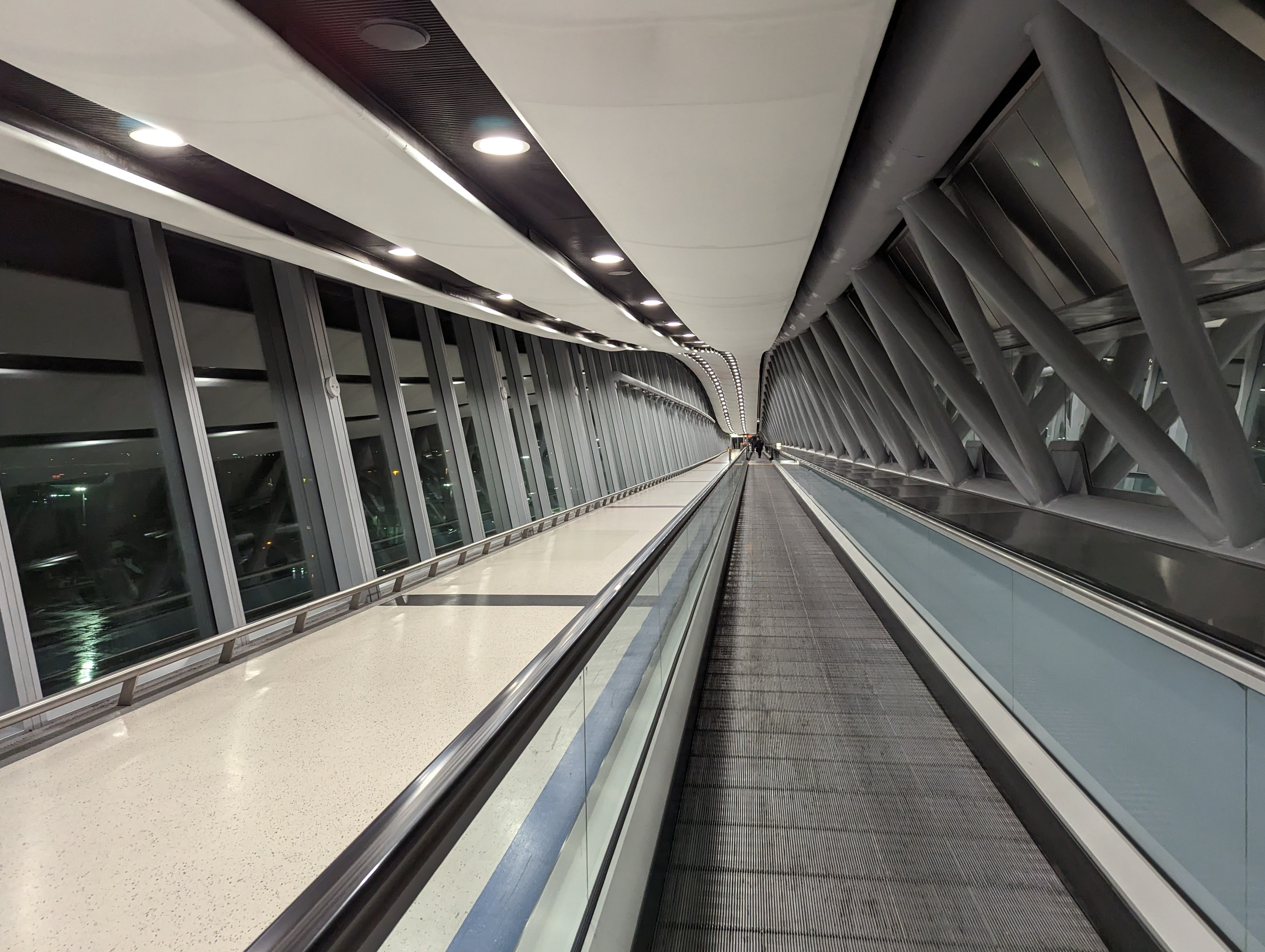
Interior of the North Terminal apron pier bridge

On 31 May 2008, Virgin Holidays opened the V Room, Gatwick's first lounge dedicated to their long-haul leisure travellers. On 25 January 2017, the lounge moved to the North Terminal together with the Virgin Atlantic Clubhouse as part of the airline moves that saw British Airways and Virgin Atlantic exchange their previous terminal locations and easyJet consolidated in the North Terminal. On 9 April 2009, an independent pay-for-access lounge opened in the South Terminal. Gatwick also has a conference and business centre, and several on- and off-site hotels ranging in class from executive to economy.

The airport has Anglican, Catholic and Free Church chaplains, and there are multi-faith prayer and counselling rooms in each terminal. A daily service is led by one of the chaplains.

The Civil Aviation Authority Safety Regulation Group is in Aviation House. WesternGeco, a geophysical services company, has its head office and Europe–Africa–Russia offices in Schlumberger House, a 124,000 sq ft (11,500 m^{2}) building on the airport grounds near the South Terminal. The company had a 15-year lease on the building, scheduled to expire in June 2008. In 2007, WesternGeco reached an agreement with its landlord, BAA Lynton, extending its lease to 2016 at an initial rent of £2.1 million. Fastjet has its registered and head offices at Suite 2C in First Point at the airport.

Before the sale, BAA planned an £874 million investment at Gatwick over five years, including increased capacity for both terminals, improvements to the transport interchange and a new baggage system for the South Terminal. Passengers passing through the airport are informed about the redevelopment programme with large mobile barcodes on top of construction hoardings. Scanning these transfers information on the construction to the user's smartphone.

In the summer of 2013, Gatwick introduced Gatwick Connect, a free flight connection service to assist passengers changing flights at Gatwick whose airlines do not provide a full flight connection service. On 15 September 2015, the service was rebranded as GatwickConnects. It is available to passengers connecting on several major airlines.

=== Flight movements ===
Gatwick operates as a single-runway airport although it has two runways; the northern runway (08L/26R) can only be used when the main runway (08R/26L) is out of use. The UK Integrated Aeronautical Information Package gives the Takeoff Run Available (TORA) of its main runway (08R/26L) as 3,255 m when aircraft take off in a westerly direction (26) and 3,159 m when takeoffs occur in an easterly direction (08). The documentation lists the respective TORA for the northern runway (08L/26R) as 2,565 m in both directions. Nearly three-quarters of takeoffs are towards the west (74% over 12 months). Both runways are 148 ft (45 m) wide; they are 656 ft (200 m) apart, which is insufficient for the simultaneous use of both runways. During normal operations the northern runway is used as a taxiway, consistent with its original construction (although it was gradually widened).

In October 2018, the airport announced that it was "exploring how to make best use of its existing runways, including the possibility of bringing its existing standby runway into routine use". One scenario would see 08L/26R used for departing narrow-body aircraft only, while the longer 08R/26L would be used for wide-body take-offs and all landings; widening 08L/26R would also increase the centreline separation slightly. New technology could also be used to increase capacity on the main runway, and, in the longer term, the airport remains interested in constructing a new runway to the south.

In 2023, plans were announced to expand the second runway and make it operational for regular use.

The main runway uses a Category III Instrument Landing System (ILS). The northern runway does not have an ILS; when it is in use, arriving aircraft are radar vectored to intercept an RNAV (GNSS) approach, providing the aircraft is equipped and the operator has approval. This approach is satellite-based and is also available for the main runway. When an RNAV approach is not possible, assistance from the approach controller using surveillance radar, an "SRA approach" is available. This involves heading instructions and altitude callouts supplied by the Air Traffic Controller. On both runways, a continuous descent approach is used to minimise the environmental effects of incoming aircraft, particularly at night.

Night flights are subject to restrictions; between 11 pm and 7 am, noisier aircraft (rated QC/8 and QC/16) may not operate. From 11.30 pm to 6 am (the night quota period) there are three limits: Number of flights, a Quota Count system, limiting total noise permitted and no night QC/4 flights.

In late 2020, Gatwick introduced the "Airline Noise Performance Table" (ANPT), quarterly and annually published tables that score the busiest airlines at the airport based on their performance for three environmental benchmarks. The table covers noise Quota Count (QC) per seat, Continuous Descent Approach (CDA) performance and departure track-keeping (TK) performance relative to the Noise Preferential Routes (NPRs). QC per seat is a calculated value, whereas CDA and track-keeping performance are measured results and show % compliance. TK violations on Lambourne departures from Runway 26 (Route 4) are disregarded for the purpose of ANPT statistics. The airlines featured in each quarterly and annual report are ranked from best to worse for each of the three benchmarks based on the scores achieved. In 2025, while continuing to publish the quarterly and annual reports as documents, Gatwick introduced an interactive ANPT dashboard on its website. This replicates the static reports, but with the addition of a new “Final rank” column, the derivation and significance of which is not explained.

Air traffic control services are outsourced. In 2014 a proposed contract award for air traffic control services was suspended due to errors in the airport operator's procurement process, which was governed at the time by the European Union's rules on procurement in the energy, telecommunications, transport and water sectors. Consideration of the legal case brought by NATS UK discussed whether the court's approach to resolving such cases should consider the American Cyanamid principles reflected in UK national procurement law or a different "balance of interests" test, as proposed by NATS, which was less likely to allow a proposed contract award where damages paid to a successful challenger might be an adequate legal remedy. Use of the "balance of interests" test was ruled out by Mr Justice Ramsey.

=== Security ===
The airport is policed by the Gatwick District of Sussex Police. The district is responsible for the entire airport (including aircraft) and, in certain circumstances, aircraft in flight. The 150 officers attached to this district include armed and unarmed officers, and community support officers for minor offences. The airport district counters man-portable surface-to-air missiles (MANPADS) by patrolling in and around the airport and a separate sub-unit has vehicle checks around the airport.

Access to airside portions of the airport is controlled and maintained by the airport's team of security officers, regulated by the Civil Aviation Authority. Brook House, an immigration removal centre of Immigration Enforcement, was opened near the airport on 18 March 2009 by the then Home Secretary Jacqui Smith.

=== Major airlines ===
The airport is a base for scheduled airlines British Airways (BA), easyJet, Wizz Air, and charter operators such as TUI Airways. Gatwick is unique among London's airports in its representation of the three main airline business models: full service, low-cost and charter. As of October 2016, these respectively accounted for 26.6%, (Note: excluding scheduled regional air services) 61.3% and 13.1% (Note: including scheduled regional air services) of Gatwick's seat capacity.

By late 2015, easyJet flew over 100 routes from Gatwick with a fleet of more than 60 aircraft. The airport is the carrier's largest base and its 16 million passengers per year accounted for 45% of Gatwick's 2013 total (ahead of Gatwick's second-largest passenger airline: BA, whose 4.5 million passengers comprised 14% of total passenger traffic in 2011–12). (Note: 1 April 2011 to 31 March 2012)

EasyJet, BA and Norwegian Air Shuttle were Gatwick's three biggest resident airlines, although in late 2020 Norwegian announced the closure of its base at Gatwick. According to data from Airport Coordination Limited, these three airlines respectively accounted for 43.3%, 19% and 10.5% of airport slots in April 2018. According to this data, by April 2018 Norwegian had overtaken Virgin Atlantic as Gatwick's number one transatlantic airline by seat capacity, and BA's competitive response to Norwegian's growing commercial threat to its transatlantic business would result in Virgin's relegation to third position among the airport's transatlantic airlines during the 2018 summer timetable period. easyJet, BA and Norwegian collectively accounted for 65.43% of Gatwick's total passengers in 2016 (easyJet: 40.37% / 17.4 million; BA: 14.39% / 6.2 million; Norwegian: 10.67% / 4.6 million). As per Official Airline Guide (OAG) data for the week of 29 May 2017, their respective international departure seat capacity shares at the airport for summer 2017 are 42.1%, 15.4% and 9.4%.

In terms of passengers carried easyJet and BA were also among the five largest airlines operating at Gatwick in 2010 (which also included TUI Airways and Thomas Cook Airlines at the time) and the top 10 in 2015. In terms of total scheduled airline seats at Gatwick in 2014, easyJet accounted for 18.36 million, more than two-and-a-half times as many as second-placed BA (7 million) and nearly five times the number offered by third-placed Norwegian Air Shuttle (3.74 million). Using data sourced from the OAG Schedules Analyser, the following changes in the respective departure seat capacity shares of Gatwick's three biggest airlines occurred from 2010 to 2015: easyJet's share increased from 26.1% in 2010 to 42.1% in 2015; BA's share dropped from 18.3% in 2010 to 15% in 2015; Norwegian's share rose almost three-fold from less than 3% in 2010 to 8.3% in 2015. easyJet, BA, Norwegian, TUI Airways, Ryanair, Thomas Cook Airlines, Monarch Airlines, Virgin Atlantic, Vueling and Emirates were Gatwick's top 10 airlines by share of passengers in 2017.

EasyJet's acquisition of BA franchise carrier GB Airways in March 2008 increased its share of airport slots to 24% (from 17% in late 2007); the airline became the largest short-haul operator at the airport, accounting for 29% of short-haul passengers. By 2009, BA's share of Gatwick slots had fallen to 20% from its peak of 40% in 2001. By 2010, this had declined to 16%. By mid-2012, easyJet had 45% of Gatwick's early-morning peak time slots (6 a.m. to 8:55 a.m.). (Note: British Airways, 15%; Thomson Airways, 11%; Monarch Airlines, 7%; Flybe and Thomas Cook Airlines, 6% each)

By 2008, Flybe was Gatwick's third-largest airline (accounting for 9% of its slots) and its fastest-growing airline. It became the airport's largest domestic operator, carrying 1.2 million passengers in its 2011–2012 financial year on eight routes to destinations in the UK, the Channel Islands and the Isle of Man. In March 2013, the airline announced that it would end operations at Gatwick, citing unsustainably high airport charges and increases in UK Air Passenger Duty. Flybe sold its 25 pairs of daily slots (Note: including eight early-morning peak-time slot pairs) at the airport to easyJet for £20 million. The latter's share of Gatwick slots increased to 44% in summer 2014; second-placed BA has held about 16% of the airport's slots since 2010. Following the sale of its Gatwick slots to easyJet, Flybe continued to provide the scheduled service between Gatwick and Newquay, as a result of being awarded the contract to fly this route under a four-year Public Service Obligation (PSO), until the flight was subsequently moved from Gatwick to Heathrow Airport in April 2019.

Slots left by the US carriers (and the collapse of Zoom Airlines, Oasis Hong Kong Airlines, XL Airways UK, Sterling Airlines, Monarch Airlines, Thomas Cook Airlines and Adria Airways) were taken by easyJet, Flybe, Norwegian Air Shuttle and Ryanair. Many full-service airlines have established or resumed operations at the airport, including Air China, Cathay Pacific, China Eastern Airlines, China Southern Airlines, Delta Air Lines, JetBlue, Qatar Airways, Singapore Airlines, Turkish Airlines and WestJet. This is part of the airport's strategy to attract higher-spending business travellers (countering its dependence on European low-cost and charter markets), increasing year-round capacity utilisation by smoothing peaks and troughs in traffic. Gatwick's success in persuading these airlines to launch (or re-launch) routes to overseas destinations important for business and leisure travel was aided by a lack of comparable slots at Heathrow.

On 5 May 2020, Virgin Atlantic announced it would cease operations at Gatwick due to the COVID-19 pandemic. On 18 August 2020, Wizz Air announced a new hub at Gatwick Airport. Initially basing their A321 aircraft there along with additional commercial routes to Greece, Italy, Spain, and Malta operating from 22 October 2020, onwards.

In September 2021, the International Airlines Group announced that British Airways would terminate its short- and medium-haul base operations at Gatwick with immediate effect resulting in the cancellation of more than 30 routes. This came after labour negotiations regarding the handover of these operations, most of which were still suspended due to the COVID-19 pandemic, to a newly formed budget subsidiary failed. British Airways continues to serve two domestic destinations, Glasgow and Manchester alongside their long-haul network from Gatwick.

British Airways later resumed short-haul flights from Gatwick, as a new subsidiary that was initially operated by British Airways, but then under the trading name "BA EuroFlyer". The company expected this to happen by the autumn of 2022.

=== City Place Gatwick ===
Gatwick's original terminal, the Beehive, is included within the City Place Gatwick office complex together with 1, 2 and 3 City Place. The complex was developed by BAA Lynton. Some airlines have had offices at the Beehive, including BEA/British Airways Helicopters, Jersey Airlines, Caledonian Airways, Virgin Atlantic and GB Airways.

Other airlines which had headquarters on airport property (including office buildings on the site of, or adjacent to, the original 1930s airport) include British Caledonian, British United Airways, CityFlyer Express, Fastjet, Laker Airways and Tradewinds Airways.

=== Gatwick Aviation Museum ===
Situated to the northwest of the airfield near the village of Charlwood, there is a museum including original items and photographs from Gatwick's history, as well as a variety of military aircraft. It is open Friday, Saturday and Sunday all year round.

== Terminals ==
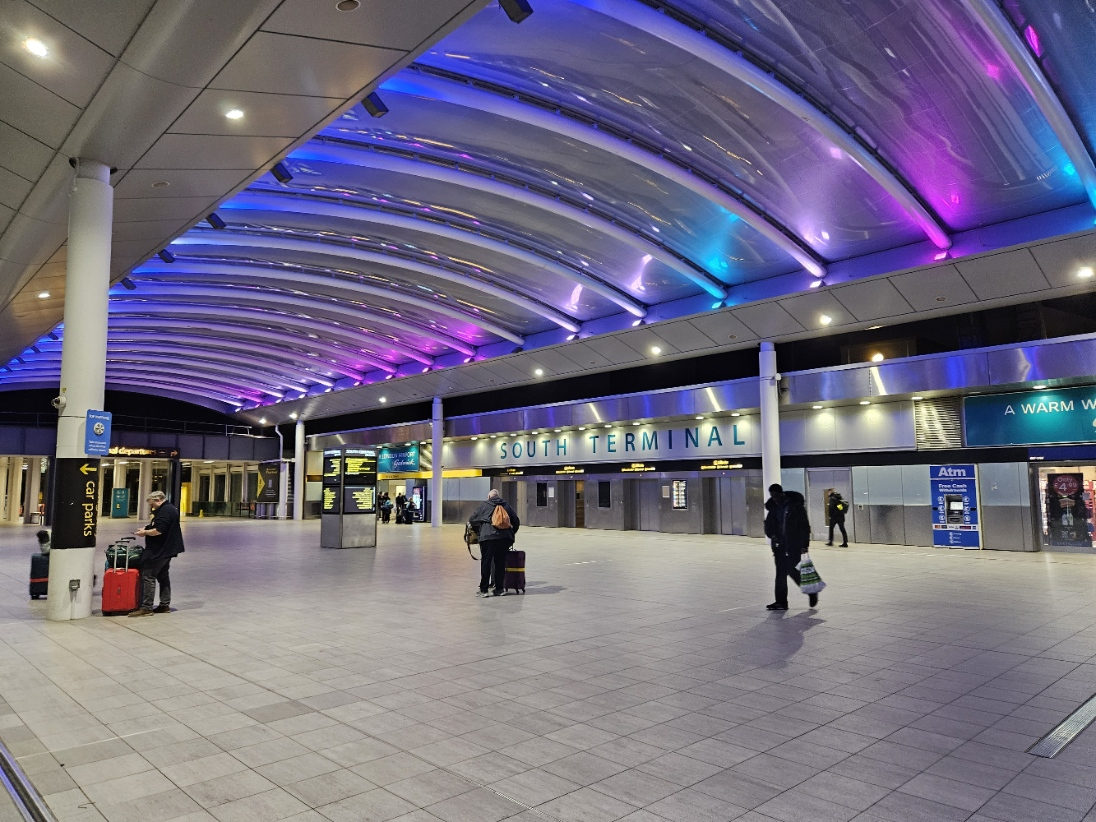
South Terminal main entrance

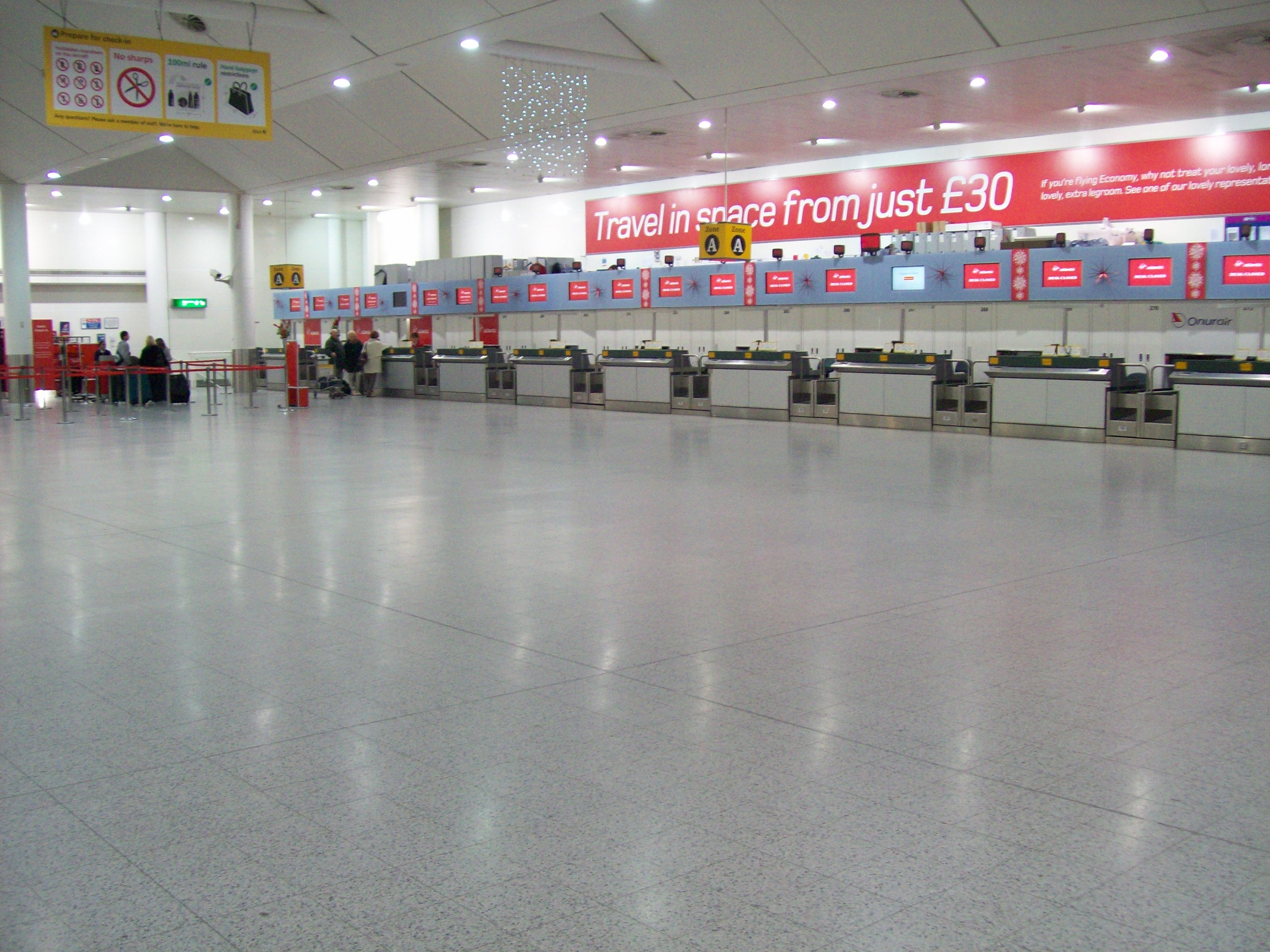
South Terminal check-in area

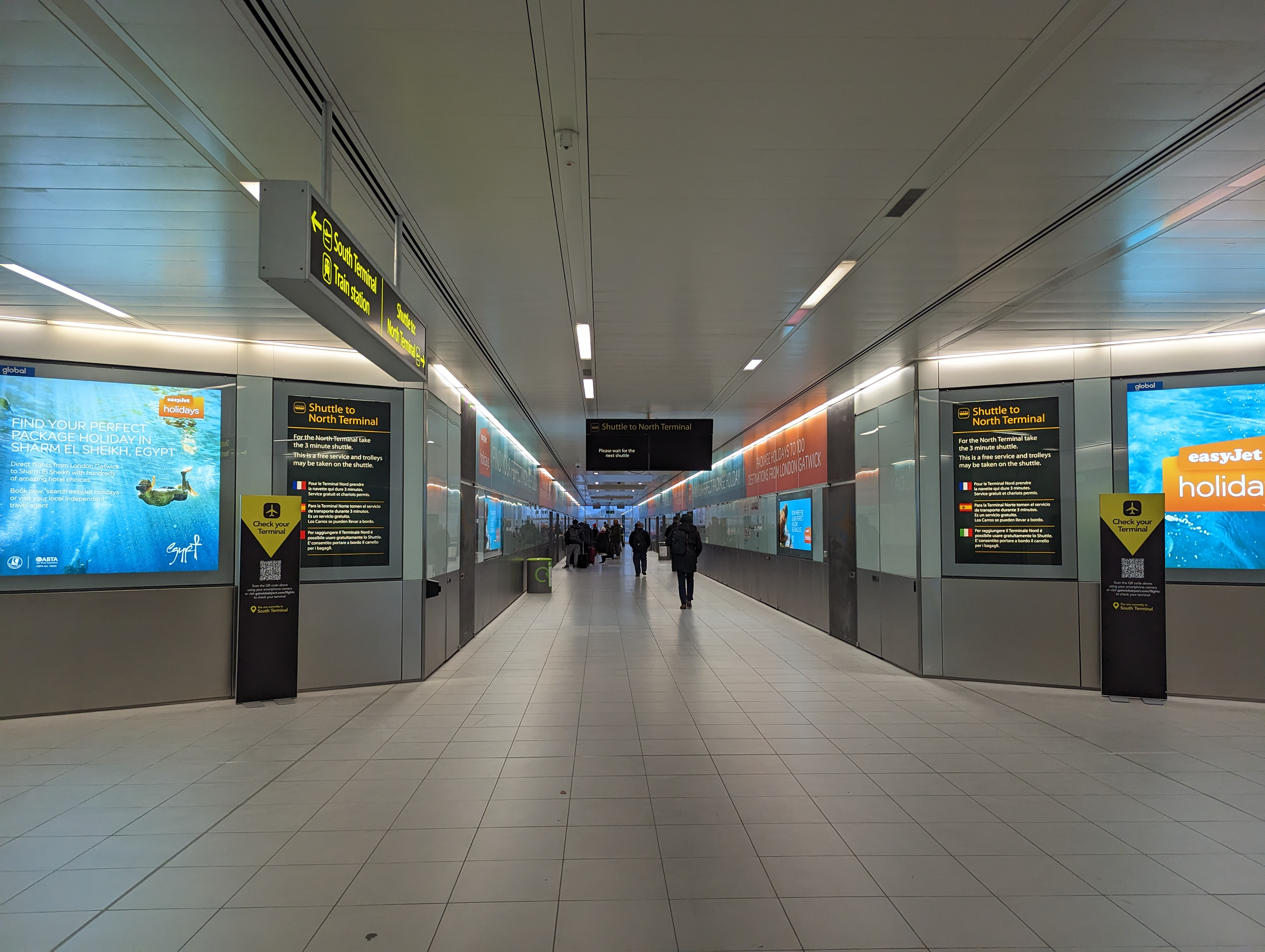
South Terminal shuttle station

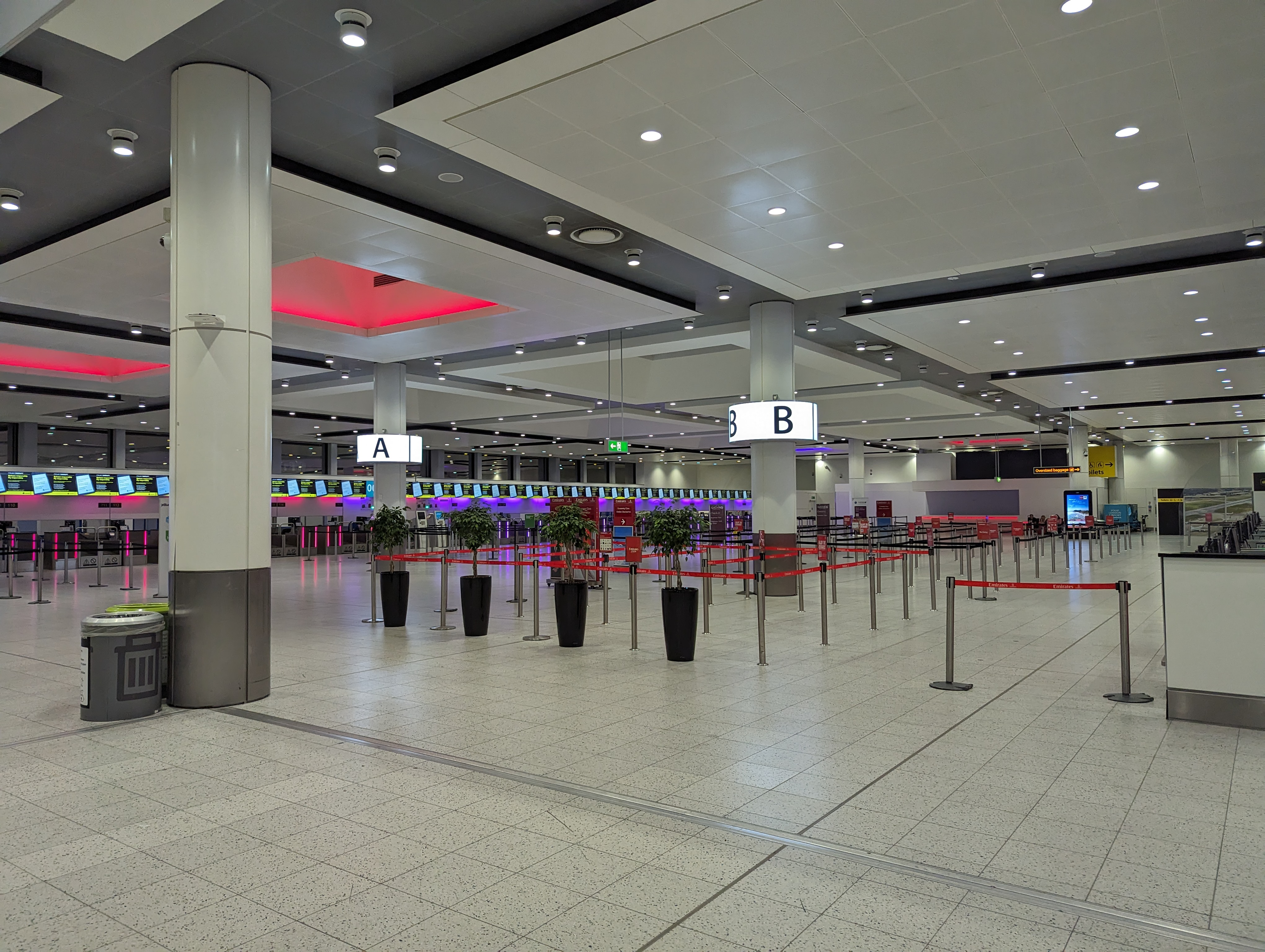
North Terminal check-in zones A and B

The airport has two terminals, South and North, with 65 total gates. Both have shops and restaurants landside and airside, and all areas are accessible to disabled passengers. There are facilities for baby changing and feeding. Business travellers have specialised lounges. The North and South Terminals are connected by a 0.75-mile (1.21 km), elevated, two-way automated people mover landside. They are not connected once past security.

=== South Terminal ===
South Terminal has 32 gates with jetbridges and 7 remote gates. Pier 1 has gates 1–5, all equipped with jetbridges, Pier 2 has gates 10A and gates 10-28 all with jetbridges, except 10A. Pier 3 has gates 31-39 jetbridges and 90-95 (bus gates). The official opening of the central pier of what is now the South Terminal, with 11 aircraft stands, was on 9 June 1958. Gatwick was one of the world's first airports with an enclosed pier-based terminal, which allowed passengers to walk under cover to waiting areas near the aircraft (with only a short walk outdoors). Another feature of Gatwick's new air terminal was its modular design, permitting subsequent, phased expansion. As passenger numbers grew, a circular satellite pier was added to the terminal building. It was connected to the main terminal by the UK's first automated people mover system. This replaced the original North Pier dating from 1962; the people mover was subsequently replaced with a walkway and travelators.

The South Terminal was temporarily closed from June 2020, and all airlines normally operating from this terminal were relocated to the North Terminal, owing to the sharp decline in passenger traffic as a result of the devastating impact of the COVID-19 pandemic. It fully reopened in March 2022. During the time it was not in operation, it was used as a remote filming location for the fourteenth series of the television show Taskmaster.

=== North Terminal ===
North Terminal was opened in March 1988 by Queen Elizabeth II. It has 31 gates with jetbridges including three which can support an Airbus A380. Pier 4 has bussing gate 45 (split into multiple different exits) and jetbridge gates 46–55. Pier 5 has gates 557–574, all with jetbridges. Pier 6 has gates 681-690 these were renumbered from 23 January 2026, all with jetbridges, except for gate 681 (no jetbridge), and former gates 108, 109, 110, are now decommissioned for the construction of the extension to the western end of the pier due to open in 2027. Construction began on the North Terminal on land previously earmarked for a second runway in the draft plan of May 1970. This was the largest construction project south of London in the 1980s, costing £200 million. In 1991 a second aircraft pier was added to the North Terminal. On 16 May 2005, the new Pier 6 opened at £110 million, adding 11 pier-served aircraft stands. The pier is linked to the North Terminal's main building by the second-largest air passenger bridge in the world, (Note: The largest is the IAF Pedestrian Walkway at Seattle-Tacoma International Airport which opened in 2022.) spanning a taxiway and providing passengers with views of the airport and taxiing aircraft.

A large extension to the terminal was opened by former prime minister John Major in November 2011.

On 14 August 2026, the terminal was temporarily rebranded as the "Jordan North Terminal" to mark the fact that Capital Breakfast, which is co-hosted by Jordan North, was being broadcast live from the venue on that day.

=== Terminal assignments and rearrangements ===
As part of a seven-year strategic commercial partnership between Gatwick and EasyJet, the airport proposed several changes to individual airlines' terminal locations. These would see EasyJet consolidate all its Gatwick operations in the North Terminal, while British Airways and Virgin Atlantic would swap their terminals. Gatwick believes that these terminal moves improve the airport's operational efficiency and resilience, as the use of different terminals by EasyJet and British Airways reduces pressure on the North Terminal's check-in, security, boarding and ramp areas at peak times. In addition, a terminal swap by Virgin frees up lounge and gate space for BA long-haul passengers in the South Terminal and, unlike BA's current short-haul schedules, Virgin's long-haul schedules do not clash with EasyJet's busy schedule in the North Terminal due to the airlines' differing peak times.

It was confirmed in January 2015 that British Airways would move all its flights to the South Terminal in November 2016 while all EasyJet flights would be consolidated in the North Terminal at the same time. However, it was decided in February 2016 to postpone the agreed relocation of airlines until 25 January 2017, to avoid operational disruptions over the 2016–17 Christmas season and to give all parties involved enough time to deal with any unforeseen issues ahead of the February 2017 half-term holidays. The relocation of these airlines was accomplished by the revised date of 25 January 2017.

== Airlines and destinations ==
The following airlines operate regularly scheduled passenger flights at Gatwick Airport:

Airlines	Destinations
Aegean Airlines	Seasonal: Athens
Air Arabia	Sharjah, Tangier
Air China	Beijing–Capital, Shanghai–Pudong; Seasonal: Chengdu–Tianfu
Air Europa	Madrid
Air France	Paris–Charles de Gaulle
Air India	Ahmedabad, Amritsar
Air Mauritius	Mauritius
Air Peace	Abuja, Lagos
Air Sierra Leone	Banjul, Freetown
Air Tanzania	Dar es Salaam, Kilimanjaro, Zanzibar (all begin 1 July 2027)
Air Transat	Toronto–Pearson; Seasonal: Montréal–Trudeau, Ottawa
Air Zimbabwe	Harare
airBaltic	Riga, Tallinn; Seasonal: Kuusamo (begins 13 December 2026)
Animawings	Bucharest–Otopeni
Atlantic Airways	Seasonal: Vágar
Aurigny	Guernsey
Azerbaijan Airlines	Baku
Beijing Capital Airlines	Qingdao
British Airways	Accra, Agadir, Alicante, Antigua, Bangkok–Suvarnabhumi, Barbados, Bordeaux, Cancún, Dubrovnik, Faro, Funchal, Georgetown–Cheddi Jagan, Glasgow, Gran Canaria, Graz, Grenada, Islamabad, Jersey, Kingston–Norman Manley, Lanzarote, Larnaca, Málaga, Malta, Marrakesh, Mauritius, Orlando, Palma de Mallorca, Porto, Port of Spain, Punta Cana, Rabat, Salzburg, Seville, St. Lucia–Hewanorra, Tenerife–South, Turin, Verona; Seasonal: Antalya, Bari, Cagliari, Catania, Chambéry, Chania, Colombo–Bandaranaike, Corfu, Dalaman, Geneva, Grenoble, Heraklion, Ibiza, Innsbruck, Ivalo, Kalamata, Kilimanjaro (begins 29 May 2027), Kos, Lyon, Menorca, Montpellier, Nice, Paphos, Rhodes, Rovaniemi (begins 4 December 2026), Sharm El Sheikh, Thessaloniki, Vancouver, Zanzibar (begins 29 May 2027)
China Eastern Airlines	Shanghai–Pudong
China Southern Airlines	Guangzhou, Zhengzhou
Condor	Frankfurt
Croatia Airlines	Seasonal: Split
easyJet	Aberdeen, Agadir, Alicante, Almería, Amsterdam, Antalya, Athens, Barcelona, Bari, Basel/Mulhouse, Belfast–City, Belfast–International, Berlin, Bordeaux, Budapest, Catania, Copenhagen, Dalaman, Düsseldorf, Edinburgh, Enfidha, Faro, Fuerteventura, Funchal, Geneva, Gibraltar, Glasgow, Gran Canaria, Hamburg, Hurghada, Innsbruck, Inverness, Isle of Man, Jersey, Kraków, Lanzarote, Larnaca, Lisbon, Ljubljana, Lyon, Madrid, Málaga, Malta, Marrakesh, Marseille, Menorca, Milan–Linate, Milan–Malpensa, Montpellier, Munich, Murcia, Nantes, Naples, Nice, Nuremberg (begins 19 November 2026), Palma de Mallorca, Paphos, Paris–Charles de Gaulle, Pisa, Porto, Prague, Rennes, Rome–Fiumicino, Sal, Seville, Sharm El Sheikh, Strasbourg, Tenerife–South, Thessaloniki, Toulouse, Turin, Valencia, Venice, Verona, Zurich; Seasonal: Ajaccio (begins 30 June 2027), Akureyri, Bastia, Biarritz, Bodrum, Brest, Brindisi, Burgas,, Cagliari (begins 1 June 2027), Chania, Corfu, Dubrovnik, Figari, Friedrichshafen, Girona (begins 3 June 2027), Grenoble, Heraklion, Ibiza, İzmir, Kalamata, Kefalonia, Kittilä, Kos, La Rochelle, Luxor, Mykonos, Olbia, Palermo, Preveza/Lefkada, Pula, Reus, Reykjavík–Keflavík, Rhodes, Rimini, Rovaniemi, Sälen-Trysil, Salzburg, Santorini, Skiathos, Sofia, Split, Tivat, Tromsø, Vienna, Zadar, Zakynthos
Emirates	Dubai–International
Ethiopian Airlines	Addis Ababa
Eurowings	Cologne/Bonn, Stuttgart
FlyErbil	Erbil
Gulf Air	Bahrain
Iberia Express	Madrid
Icelandair	Reykjavík–Keflavík
Jet2.com	Alicante, Antalya, Faro, Fuerteventura, Gran Canaria, Hurghada (begins 12 February 2027), Lanzarote, Málaga, Malta, Paphos, Sharm El Sheikh (begins 11 February 2027), Tenerife–South; Seasonal: Agadir, Burgas, Chambéry (begins 21 December 2026), Cologne/Bonn (begins 26 November 2026), Corfu, Dubrovnik (begins 3 May 2027), Funchal, Gdańsk (begins 27 November 2026), Geneva (begins 19 December 2026), Girona, Grenoble (begins 13 December 2026), Heraklion, Ibiza, Kalamata, Kefalonia, Kos, Menorca, Mytilene (begins 2 May 2027), Naples, Palma de Mallorca, Preveza/Lefkada, Pula, Reus, Rhodes, Salzburg (begins 26 December 2026), Skiathos, Tallinn (begins 19 November 2026), Thessaloniki, Turin (begins 13 December 2026), Verona, Vienna (begins 19 November 2026), Zakynthos; Seasonal charter: Banjul
JetBlue	Seasonal: Boston
Kenya Airways	Nairobi–Jomo Kenyatta
KM Malta Airlines	Malta
Norse Atlantic Airways	Orlando; Seasonal: Bangkok–Suvarnabhumi, Cape Town, New York–JFK
Norwegian Air Shuttle	Aalborg, Bergen, Billund, Copenhagen, Helsinki, Oslo, Stavanger, Stockholm–Arlanda, Trondheim; Seasonal: Ålesund, Gothenburg, Rovaniemi
Nouvelair	Tunis
Qanot Sharq	Tashkent
Qatar Airways	Doha
Pegasus Airlines	Istanbul–Sabiha Gökçen
Royal Air Maroc	Casablanca, Tétouan; Seasonal: Tangier
Ryanair	Alicante, Cork, Dublin, Shannon
Saudia	Jeddah
Singapore Airlines	Singapore
Sky Alps	Bolzano
Sky Express	Athens
SunExpress	Antalya, İzmir; Seasonal: Bodrum, Dalaman
Swiss International Air Lines	Zurich; Seasonal: Geneva
TAP Air Portugal	Lisbon, Porto
TUI Airways	Agadir, Athens (begins 28 March 2027), Boa Vista, Cancún, Enfidha, Fuerteventura, Gran Canaria, Hurghada, La Palma, Lanzarote, Marrakesh, Montego Bay, Punta Cana, Sal, Sharm El Sheikh, Tenerife–South; Seasonal: Alicante, Antalya, Banjul, Barbados, Budapest, Burgas, Chambéry, Chania, Corfu, Dakar–Diass, Dalaman, Djerba (begins 3 May 2027), Dubrovnik, Düsseldorf, Geneva, Girona, Goa–Mopa, Heraklion, Ibiza, Innsbruck, Ivalo, Jerez de la Frontera, Kefalonia, Kittilä, Kos, Kuusamo, La Romana, Lamezia Terme, Larnaca, Luxor, Málaga, Marsa Alam, Melbourne/Orlando, Menorca, Mytilene (begins 28 March 2027), Naples, Ohrid, Olbia, Oslo, Palma de Mallorca, Paphos, Phuket, Reus, Reykjavík–Keflavík, Rhodes, Rovaniemi, Sälen-Trysil, Salzburg, Samos, Skiathos, Sofia, Split, Thessaloniki, Toulouse, Turin, Verona, Vienna (begins 22 November 2026), Zakynthos, Zanzibar (begins 3 November 2027)
Tunisair	Tunis
Turkish Airlines	Istanbul
Turkmenistan Airlines	Ashgabat
Uganda Airlines	Entebbe
Uzbekistan Airways	Tashkent
Vueling	Alicante, Barcelona, Bilbao, Florence, Málaga, Santiago de Compostela, Seville, Valencia
WestJet	Seasonal: Halifax, St. John's (NL)
Wizz Air	Budapest, Chișinău, Faro, Kraków, Larnaca, Málaga, Prague, Tel Aviv, Valencia; Seasonal: Antalya, Dalaman, Grenoble, Lyon, Podgorica, Santorini, Sharm El Sheikh, Tirana

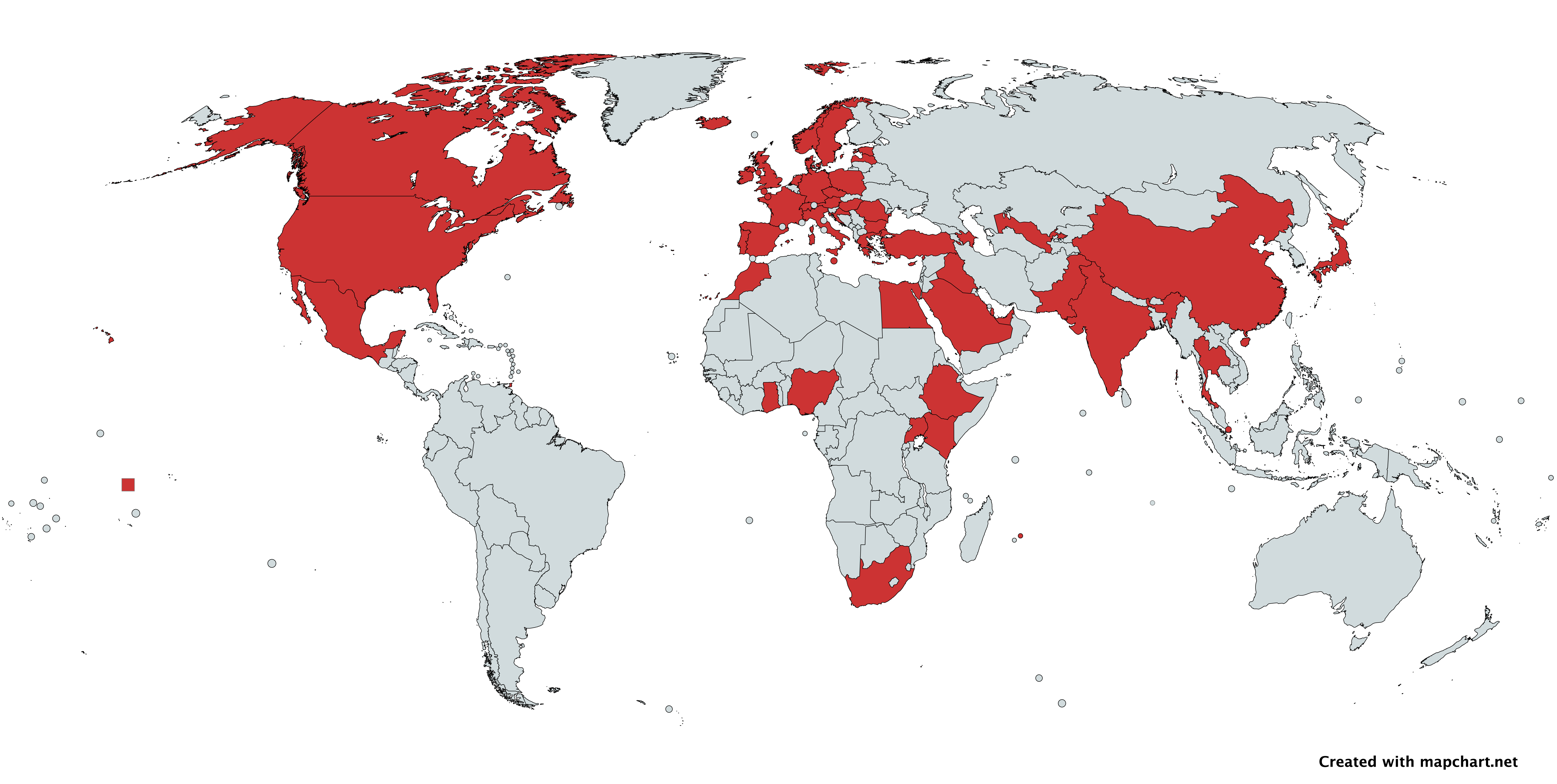
Gatwick Airport passenger destinations

== Statistics ==
=== Overview ===
In 2015, Gatwick became the first single-runway airport to handle more than 40 million passengers annually. By 2016, EasyJet accounted for over 40% of Gatwick's total passengers. When ranked by global passenger traffic, Gatwick is the 35th busiest internationally and the eighth busiest airport in Europe. Gatwick is the world's leading low-cost airport and until March 2017 had the world's busiest single-use runway, (Note: by passengers; by movements until 2016) with a maximum of 55 aircraft movements per hour.

In 2018, 46.1 million passengers passed through Gatwick, an increase of 1.1% over the previous year. North Atlantic and other long-haul (Note: excluding North Atlantic) traffic recorded increases over the previous year of 24.4% and 12.7% to 4.04 million and 4.65 million passengers, respectively. UK, (Note: including the Channel Islands and the Isle of Man) European charter, (Note: including North Africa) Irish and European scheduled passenger traffic recorded decreases over the previous year of 8.7%, 5.7%, 1.1% and 0.9% to 3.73 million, 2.88 million, 1.67 million and 29.11 million, respectively. Air transport movements decreased by 0.7% to 283,926. Cargo volume increased by 16.1% to 112,676 metric tonnes.

Compared with a year earlier, January to March 2019 passenger numbers increased by 4% to 9.675 million (an increase of 374,700 over January to March 2018). The following changes were recorded amongst individual passenger traffic categories: North Atlantic traffic +15.3% (784,200 passengers); European scheduled traffic +3.9% (5.649 million passengers); other long-haul traffic +3.2% (1.277 million passengers); European charter traffic +2.1% (710,900 passengers); Irish traffic +1.6% (412,000 passengers) and UK traffic -0.2% (841,700 passengers). Air transport movements increased by 3.3% to 62,392. Cargo volume increased by 7.2% to 27,390 metric tonnes, which was driven by a 7.5% increase in overall long-haul passenger traffic. The growing popularity of the GatwickConnects flight connections assistance service provided by the airport for self-connecting passengers was driven by additional passengers changing flights at Gatwick whose journey originated in Edinburgh (+80%), Jersey (+58%) and Belfast (+50%).

=== Busiest routes ===
Busiest international routes from Gatwick (2025)
Rank	Destination	Passengers	Change 2024/25
1	Malaga, Spain	1,239,808	▲3.5%
2	Barcelona, Spain	1,227,092	▼9.2%
3	Dublin, Republic of Ireland	1,000,460	▼5.0%
4	Dubai, United Arab Emirates	963,164	▲4.1%
5	Alicante, Spain	854,016	▲8.4%
6	Rome-Fiumicino, Italy	822,305	▼11.4%
7	Faro, Portugal	810,451	▼5.0%
8	Milan-Malpensa, Italy	751,460	▼3.5%
9	Geneva, Switzerland	728,821	▼4.6%
10	Palma de Mallorca, Spain	683,890	▼5.8%
11	Tenerife-South, Spain	674,903	▼7.4%
12	Antalya, Turkey	636,519	▼14.0%
13	Madrid, Spain	608,470	▼4.4%
14	Marrakesh, Morocco	590,787	▼2.5%
15	Istanbul, Turkey	586,961	▲0.1%
16	Amsterdam, Netherlands	537,782	▼26.3%
17	Malta, Malta	526,285	▲6.2%
18	Copenhagen, Denmark	517,825	▼12.8%
19	Shanghai, China	510,189	▲21.8%
20	Nice, France	501,850	▼3.7%
Source: CAA Statistics

Busiest domestic routes from Gatwick (2024)
Rank	Destination	Passengers	Change 2023/24
1	Edinburgh	476,152	▲3.64%
2	Glasgow	455,095	▼2.37%
3	Belfast-Intl	444,142	▼8.33%
4	Jersey	381,611	▲11.31%
5	Belfast-City	277,800	▲18.98%
6	Guernsey	254,601	▼17.22%
7	Inverness	222,417	▼0.25%
8	Aberdeen	196,469	▲0.80%
9	Isle of Man	165,643	▲3.32%
10	Newquay	83,252	▼0.83%
Source: CAA Statistics

=== Traffic ===
Gatwick handled 186,172 passengers during its first seven months of operation after the 1956–58 reconstruction; the annual number of passengers passing through the airport was 368,000 in 1959 and 470,000 in 1960. Passenger numbers reached one million for the first time during the 1962–63 fiscal year, (Note: 1 April 1962 to 31 March 1963) with British United Airways (BUA) accounting for four-fifths. The 1.5-million mark was exceeded for the first time during the 1966–67 fiscal year. (Note: 1 April 1966 to 31 March 1967) This was also the first time more than half a million scheduled passengers used the airport. Gatwick accommodated two million passengers for the first time during the 1967–68 fiscal year (Note: 1 April 1967 to 31 March 1968) and 3 million in the 1969–70 fiscal year, (Note: 1 April 1969 to 31 March 1970) with BUA accounting for nearly half. By the early 1970s, five million passengers used Gatwick each year, with a record 5.7 million during the 1973–74 fiscal year. (Note: 1 April 1973 to 31 March 1974) During that period, British Caledonian accounted for approximately half of all charter passengers and three-fourths of scheduled passengers. Within a decade annual passenger numbers doubled, to 10 million; they doubled again, to over 20 million, by the late 1980s. By the turn of the millennium, Gatwick handled more than 30 million passengers annually.

Year	Number of passengers (Note: number of passengers including both domestic and international)	Percentage change	Number of aircraft movements (Note: number of movements represents total aircraft takeoffs and landings during each year)	Freight (tonnes)
2000	32,068,540	–	260,859	318,905
2001	31,181,770	▼2.8%	252,543	280,098
2002	29,627,420	▼5.0%	242,379	242,519
2003	30,005,260	▲1.3%	242,731	222,916
2004	31,466,770	▲4.9%	251,195	218,204
2005	32,775,695	▲4.2%	261,292	222,778
2006	34,163,579	▲4.2%	263,363	211,857
2007	35,216,113	▲3.1%	266,550	171,078
2008	34,205,887	▼2.9%	263,653	107,702
2009	32,392,520	▼5.3%	251,879	74,680
2010	31,375,290	▼3.1%	240,500	104,032
2011	33,674,264	▲7.3%	251,067	88,085
2012	34,235,982	▲1.7%	246,987	97,567
2013	35,444,206	▲3.5%	250,520	96,724
2014	38,103,667	▲7.5%	259,692	88,508
2015	40,269,087	▲5.7%	267,760	73,371
2016	43,119,628	▲7.1%	280,666	79,588
2017	45,516,700	▲5.2%	285,969	96,983
2018	46,075,400	▲1.1%	283,926	112,600
2019	46,574,786	▲1.1%	282,896	110,358
2020	10,171,867	▼78.2%	79,489	26,063
2021	6,260,072	▼38.5%	52,000	11,623
2022	32,800,000	▲423.9%	217,524	36,407
2023	40,894,242	▲24.7%	253,047	61,123
2024	43,242,000	▲5.7%	265,358	103,961
2025	42,769,000	▼1.1%	263,113	120,315
^{Source 2000–2016: UK Civil Aviation Authority}^{Source 2017: Gatwick Airport Limited}^{Source 2025: UK Civil Aviation Authority}

== Ground transport ==
=== Roads ===
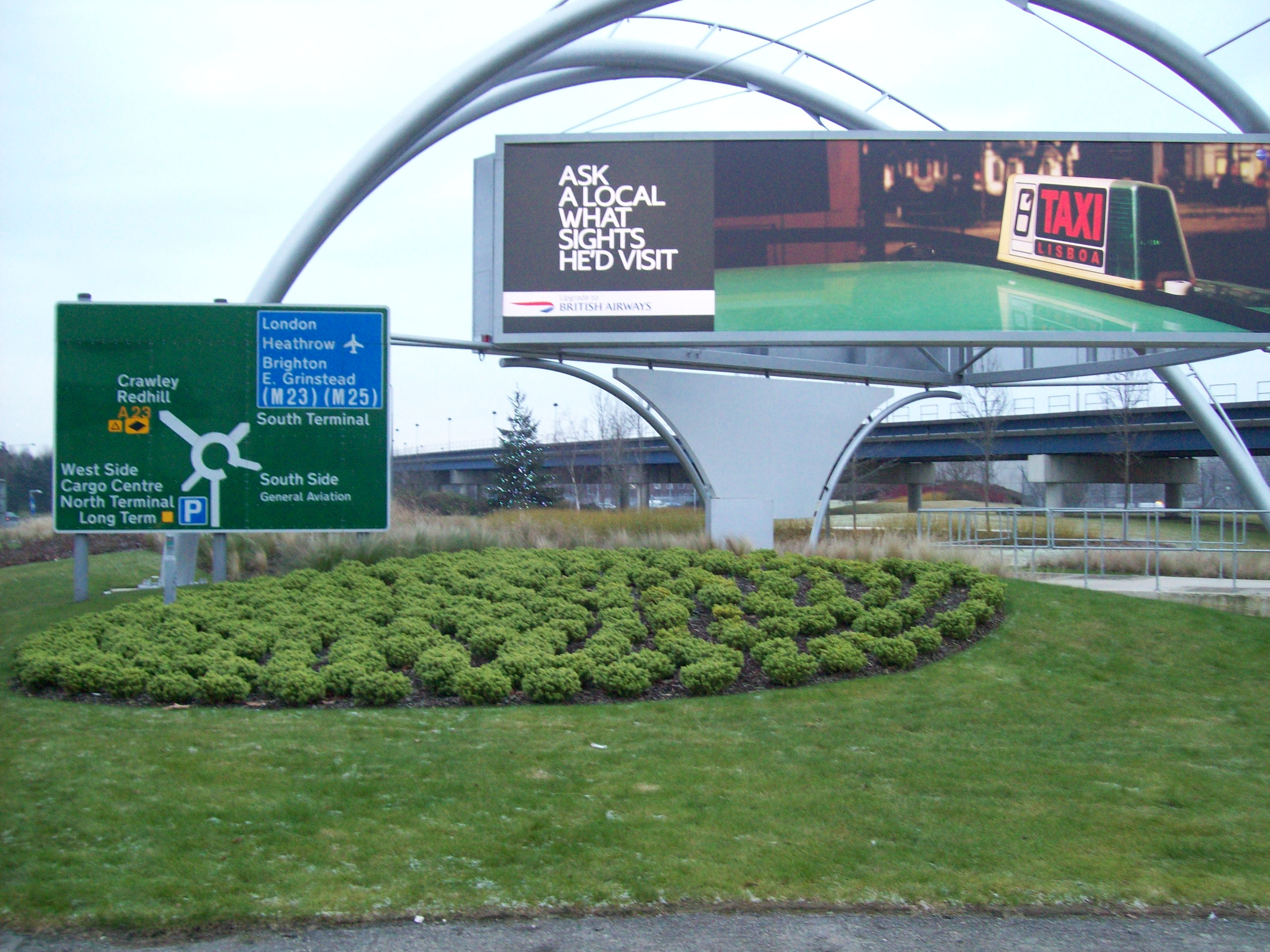
The A23 roundabout by the North Terminal

The airport is accessible from a motorway spur road at junction 9A of the M23, which links to the main motorway 1 mile (1.6 km) east at junction 9. The M23 connects with London's M25 orbital motorway, 9 miles (14 km) north; this provides access to much of Greater London, the South East and beyond. Gatwick is also accessible from the A23, which serves Horley and Redhill to the north, and Crawley and Brighton to the south. The A217 provides access northwards to the town of Reigate. The airport has long- and short-stay car parks at the airport and off-site, although these are often full in summer. Local restrictions limit parking at Gatwick.

Gatwick has set goals of 40% of airport users utilising public transport by the time annual passenger traffic reaches 40 million (in 2015) and 45% by the time it reaches 45 million.

=== Railway ===
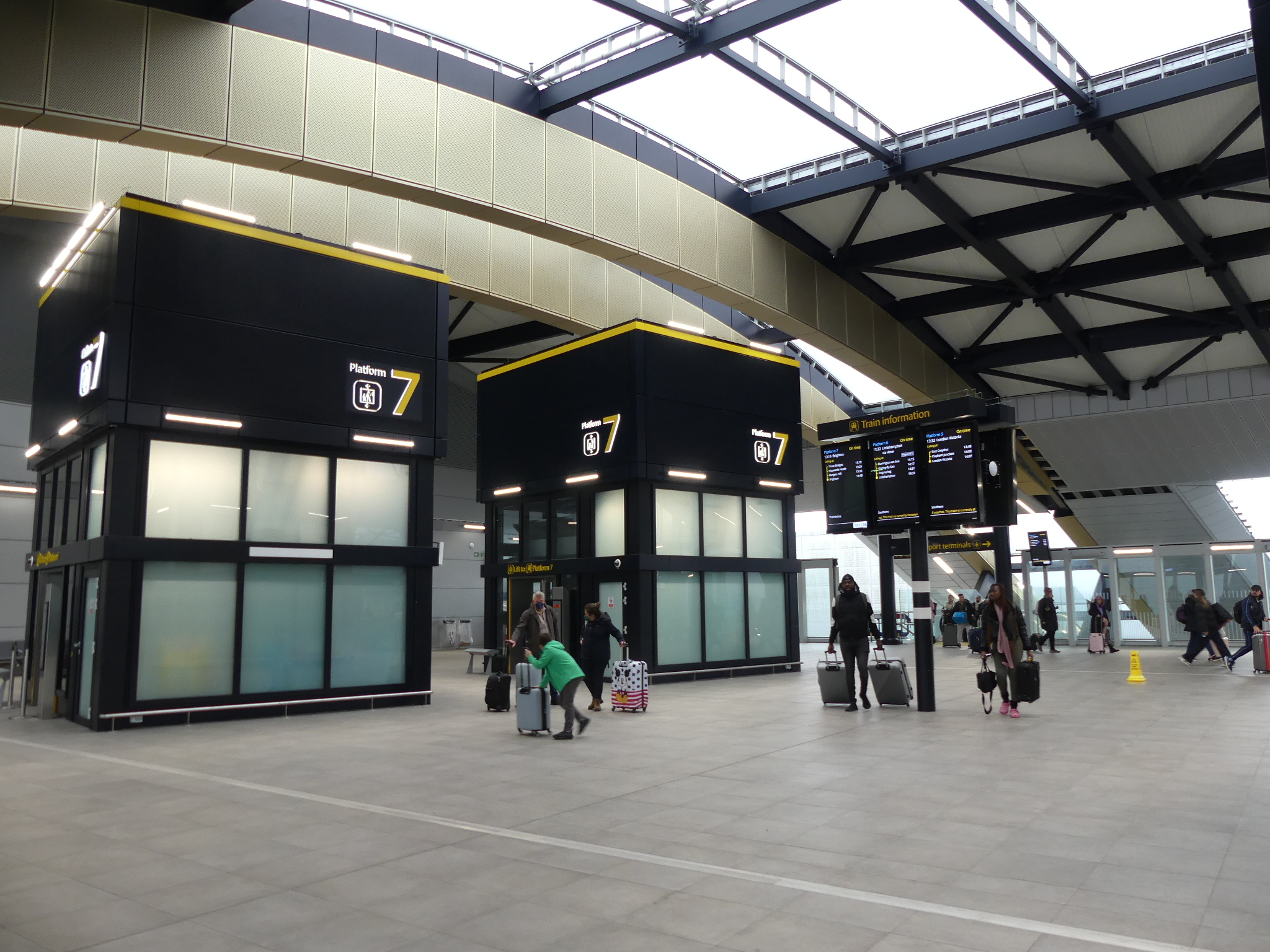
The airport's station

Gatwick Airport railway station is located adjacent to the South Terminal and has served the airport since 1958. It lies on the Brighton Main Line and is served by Southern, Thameslink and Gatwick Express; the latter also manages the station. There is also a half-hourly service on the North Downs Line, operated by Great Western Railway.

To the south, Southern, Thameslink and Gatwick Express all provide direct connections to Brighton. Southern also provides connections to Eastbourne, Littlehampton, Bognor Regis and Portsmouth Harbour.

To the north, Thameslink provides connections to London Bridge, Gatwick Express provides non-stopping connections to London Victoria and Southern provides connections to both stations. Thameslink trains continue further north through the Thameslink Core to St Pancras International, Bedford, Peterborough and Cambridge. Great Western Railway also provides a half-hourly service to Reading, via Guildford.

The station provides single-change connections to Heathrow Airport and Luton Airport, via northbound Thameslink services. Heathrow can be reached by changing to the Elizabeth line at Farringdon, whilst Luton can be reached by the DART station at Luton Airport Parkway.

London Oyster Cards and contactless cards are accepted on all rail routes from Gatwick Airport into London.

=== Buses ===
National Express operates coach services to Heathrow Airport, Stansted Airport, and cities and towns around the country. Oxford Bus Company operates direct services to Oxford, and EasyBus operates mini-coaches from both terminals to Earls Court and West Brompton.

Local buses connect the North and South Terminals with Crawley, Horley, Redhill, Horsham and Caterham. Services are operated by Metrobus, including its Fastway services operated on a partly guided bus rapid transit system, which was the first of its kind to be built outside a major city.

=== Cycling ===
Route 21 of the National Cycle Network passes under the South Terminal, allowing virtually traffic-free cycling and walking northwards to Horley and southwards to Three Bridges and Crawley. A goods-style lift runs between the terminal and ground level (labelled "Lift to Cycle Route") near Zone L.

=== Terminal transfer ===
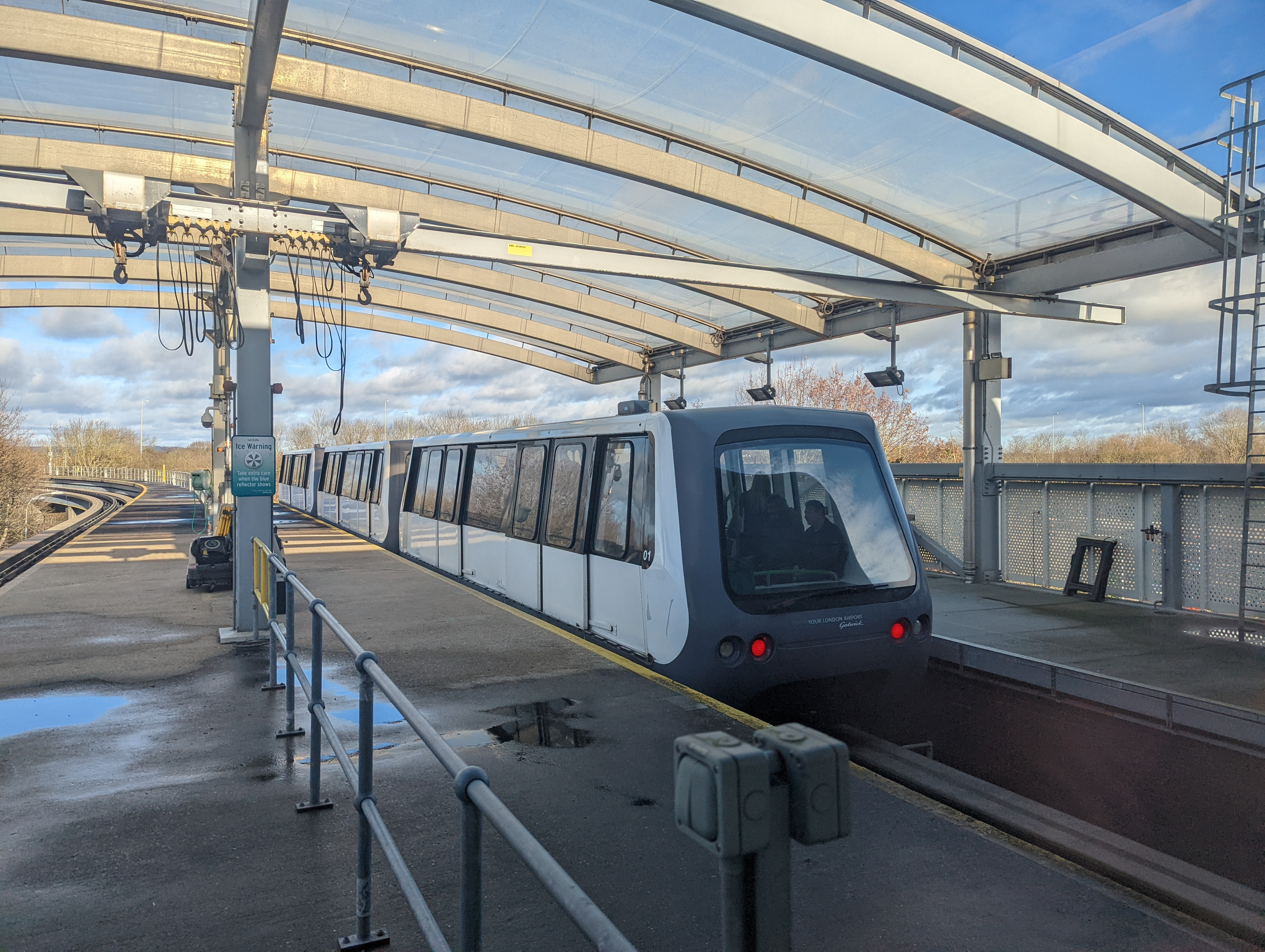
The airport terminal shuttle departing from the South Terminal

The airport's North and South Terminals are connected by a 0.75 miles (1.21 km), elevated, two-way automated people mover track. The transit shuttle normally consists of two automatic, three-car, driverless trains. Although colloquially known as a "monorail", the shuttle instead runs on a dual, concrete track with rubber tyres. The transit is land side and, besides linking the two terminals, also links the North terminal to the airport railway station. it operates every five minutes during the day and every ten overnight.

The shuttle opened in 1987, along with the North Terminal, and initially used Adtranz C-100 people-mover cars which remained in operation until September 2009, by which time they had travelled a total of 2,500,000 miles (4,000,000 km). Gatwick began upgrading its shuttle service in April 2008, with a bus replacement service in place from September 2009. A new operating system and shuttle cars (six Bombardier CX-100 vehicles) were installed, and the guideway and transit stations were refurbished at a total cost of £45 million. The system reopened on 1 July 2010, two months ahead of schedule; it featured live journey information and sensory technology to count the number of passengers at stations.

An earlier transit system, that opened in 1983 to link the main terminal (now the South Terminal) to the (then new) circular satellite pier, was the UK's first automated people-moving system. This system has since been replaced by a walkway-and-moving walkway link, although the remains of the elevated guideway are still visible.

== Expansion proposals ==
Gatwick has been included in many reviews of airport capacity in South East England. Expansion options have included a third terminal and a second runway; although an agreement not to build a second runway was made in 1979 with West Sussex County Council, that agreement expired by its terms after 40 years. Expanded operations would allow Gatwick to handle more passengers than Heathrow does today, with a new terminal between two wide-spaced runways. This would complement or replace the South Terminal, depending on expected future traffic.

Airport management's proposal for a second runway (south of the existing runway and airport boundary) was unveiled in July 2013. This was shortlisted for further consideration by the Airports Commission in December 2013, and the commission's final report was published in July 2015. Another proposal would extend the North Terminal south, with a passenger bridge in the area currently occupied by aircraft stands without jet bridges. Gatwick's draft master plan (released for consultation on 13 October 2011) dropped the passenger-bridge plan in favour of a mid-field satellite (next to the control tower) linking to the North Terminal as part of an expanded 2030 single-runway, two-terminal airport.

In late 2011, the Department for Transport (DfT) also began a feasibility study for a high-speed rail link between Gatwick and Heathrow as part of a plan combining the airports into a "collective" or "virtual hub", Heathwick. The scheme envisaged a high-speed rail route parallel to the M25, covering 35 miles (56 km) in 15 minutes. Trains would have reached speeds of 180 mph (290 km/h), and passengers would have passed through immigration (or check-in) only once. Reactions to this proposal were largely negative. Another proposal for a high-speed railway link to Heathrow, HS4Air, as part of a scheme to link the High Speed 1 and High Speed 2 railway lines and connect regional cities in Britain to the Channel Tunnel, was rejected in 2018.

On 1 July 2015, the Airports Commission submitted its final report, recommending the expansion of Heathrow Airport as opposed to Gatwick. Whilst the commission recognised Gatwick's benefits and relatively fewer environmental consequences than Heathrow, it felt that the economic benefits of Gatwick vs. Heathrow were not as great, nor as broad-ranging. Gatwick disputed the findings.

On 9 September 2021, GAL opened its first public consultation to carry out major works at the runway to increase its capacity from 64 million passengers a year to 75 million passengers a year by moving the northern "emergency" runway to the north to meet international standards for dual runway use. Airport management plans to use this runway only for take-offs by all but the largest aircraft. It hoped to receive approval in 2024, with the main works taking 4 years to complete, and 13 years to be fully complete. Works would also involve a new pier, hotels, terminal expansion and highway improvements including flyovers of the M23 Spur / A23 Airport Way at the terminal roundabouts. Planning permission for the runway realignment was formally requested in July 2023. The plan would cost around £2.2 billion, financed by private investors rather than government backing, and would be operational within around five years.

On 27 February 2025, Transport Secretary Heidi Alexander announced that she was "minded to approve" the proposals, subject to noise mitigation. A period of additional consultation was announced, pending a final decision in October 2025.

Ultimately, Gatwick's expansion is projected to create approximately 14,000 new jobs and inject £1bn annually into the regional economy. Weighing up whether such an economic boost outweighs the environmental impact could be swayed by the ability of Gatwick to successfully implement its high-tech upgrades.

On 21 September 2025, Gatwick's proposal to move the secondary runway by 12 metres (39 ft) to allow regular use was formally approved by the Transport Secretary, Heidi Alexander. The decision was challenged by campaign groups, but was upheld by the High Court on 23 June 2026 and then by the Court of Appeal on 4 August 2026.

== Accidents and incidents ==
- 15 September 1936 – A British Airways Ltd de Havilland DH 86 on a night mail flight to Germany crashed on takeoff, killing the airline's chief pilot and two crew members.
- November 1936 – A British Airways Ltd Fokker F 12 crashed in a wood 4.5 miles (7.2 km) south of Gatwick on its final approach to the airport under a low ceiling in poor visibility, killing both pilots and seriously injuring the flight engineer.
- 17 February 1959 – A Turkish Airlines Vickers Viscount 794D (registration: TC-SEV) on an international charter flight crashed in heavy fog at Newdigate, Surrey, on its approach to Gatwick after striking trees. Fourteen of the 24 on board died and Turkish prime minister Adnan Menderes was amongst the survivors.
- 5 January 1969 – A Boeing 727-113C (registration: YA-FAR) operating as Ariana Afghan Airlines Flight 701 arriving from Frankfurt Airport, Germany, crashed into a house in Fernhill, near Horley in Surrey, in low visibility. The flaps were not extended to maintain flight at final-approach speed. 48 of the 62 on board died, in addition to two on the ground.
- 28 January 1972 – A British Caledonian Vickers VC10-1109 (registration: G-ARTA) with no passengers aboard sustained severe structural damage as a result of a hard landing at Gatwick at the end of a short ferry flight from Heathrow, where the aircraft had been diverted due to fog at Gatwick. After touching down runway 08 and applying spoilers and reverse thrust, the aircraft became airborne again, bounced twice and landed heavily. This resulted in a burst front wheel tyre, a separated wheel and a crumpled fuselage (immediately in front of and behind the wings). A survey of the aircraft's damage revealed that its airframe was bent out of shape, requiring extensive repairs to restore airworthiness. Since the repairs were not cost-effective, the airline's management decided to cannibalise the aircraft for spare parts before scrapping it at Gatwick in 1975.
- 20 July 1975 – A British Island Airways (BIA) Handley Page Dart Herald 201 (registration: G-APWF) was involved in a runway accident while departing on a scheduled flight to Guernsey. The aircraft lifted off from runway 26 after a ground run of 2,490 feet (760 m) and appeared airborne for 411 ft (125 m) (with its landing gear retracting) before the rear underside of the fuselage settled back onto the runway and brought the aircraft to a stop. An investigation concluded that the landing gear was retracted before the aircraft had become established in a climb and the flap setting and takeoff speed were incorrect. Although the aircraft incurred substantial damage, none of the 45 occupants were hurt.
- 29 December 2014 – A Virgin Atlantic Boeing 747-400 (Registration: G-VROM) suffered a loss of hydraulic fluid whilst en route to Las Vegas. Shortly after departure, an alarm prompted the crew to return to Gatwick, when they discovered that an improperly installed actuator had caused the right wing landing gear to not deploy. The aircraft successfully landed on 3 main landing-gear bogies and was returned to service on 11 January 2015.
- 19–21 December 2018 – A major disruption to the airport was caused by reports of drone sightings close to the runway. The runway was closed and all flights were suspended for about six hours on 19 December. The airport reopened at 03:01 the next morning, until another reported sighting prompted another closing about 45 minutes later. As of 00:15 on 21 December, the airport was still closed with about 110,000 passengers and 760 flights affected. Officials called the drone flying a "deliberate act of disruption", but did not classify it as terrorism. The army was deployed to assist the police in resolving the incident. The runway reopened with limited capacity around 06:00 that day. Authorities suspended flights again from 17:10 to 18:23 on 21 December. Later that day a man and a woman were arrested in connection with the incident; the pair were released without charge on 23 December with Sussex Police saying that they "are no longer suspects".
- 26 February 2020 – A Titan Airways Airbus A321-211 reported an engine surge after takeoff. A few moments later, the other engine stalled. The aircraft landed safely at Gatwick 11 minutes after takeoff. The Air Accidents Investigation Branch determined fuel contamination following defective maintenance had gone undetected for two days and caused the incident. Safety recommendations were made to the European Union Aviation Safety Agency, and changes were made by organisations including Airbus and the International Air Transport Association.

== See also ==
- Airports of London
- List of airports in the United Kingdom and the British Crown Dependencies
- List of busiest airports by passenger traffic
- List of the busiest airports in Europe.
