= Norse Atlantic UK =

Low-cost airline of the United Kingdom

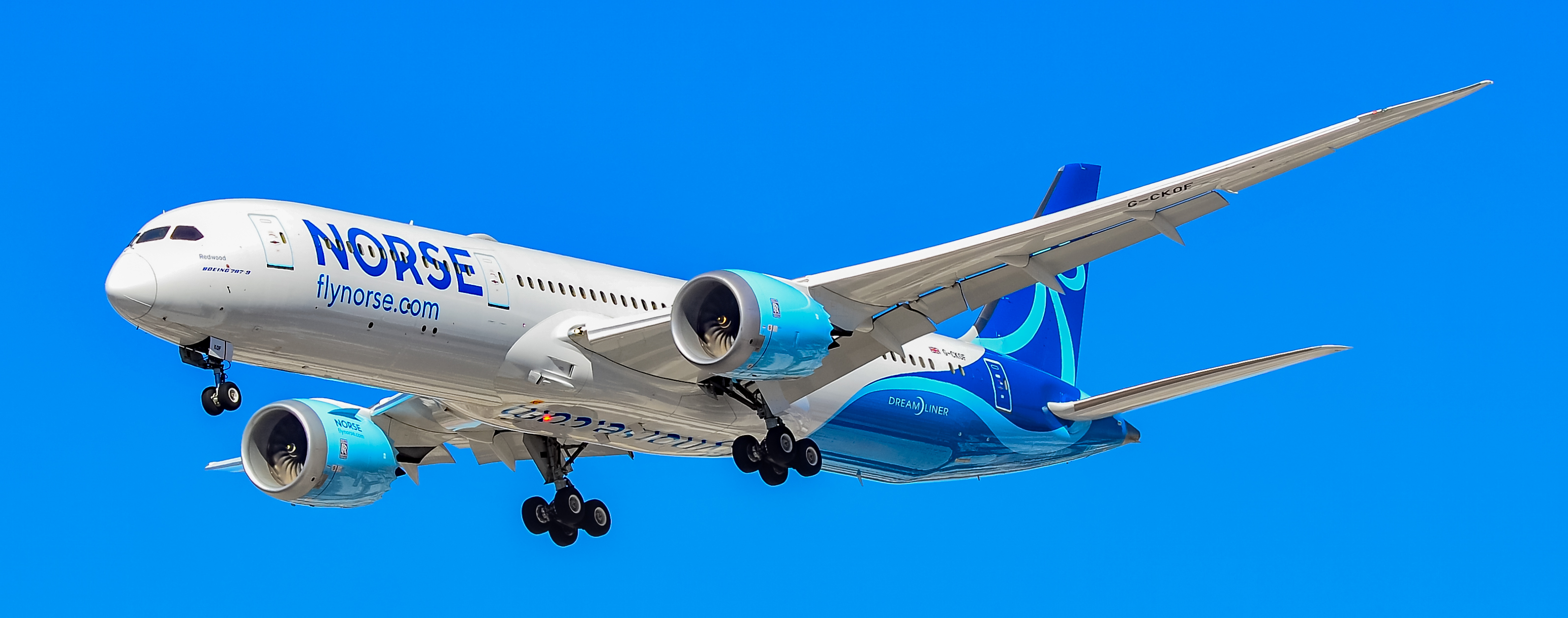
- Boeing 787-9
IATA	ICAO	Call sign
Z0	UBT	LONGBOAT
- Founded: 10 May 2021; 5 years ago
- Commenced operations: 26 March 2023; 3 years ago
- AOC #: GB 2484
- Operating bases: London–Gatwick
- Fleet size: 4
- Destinations: see Norse Atlantic Airways destinations
- Parent company: Norse Atlantic Airways
- Headquarters: Crawley, West Sussex, England, United Kingdom
- Key people: Ben Boiling (managing director)
- Website: flynorse.com

Norse Atlantic UK Ltd is a British airline that is a fully integrated subsidiary of the Norwegian low-cost airline Norse Atlantic Airways. The airline operates a fleet of Boeing 787 aircraft based at London's Gatwick Airport, and operations launched on 26 March 2023.

== History ==
Following the establishment of its parent company Norse Atlantic Airways earlier in 2021, Norse Atlantic UK was founded on 10 May 2021 as a British airline company to operate flights between the United Kingdom and the United States, following Brexit and the subsequent open skies agreement between the two countries. The airline applied for an air operator's certificate (AOC) and operating licence with the United Kingdom Civil Aviation Authority (UK CAA), expecting to receive it during the summer of 2022. Parent company Norse Atlantic Airways also applied for a foreign air carrier permit from the United States Department of Transportation (USDOT) on behalf of its British subsidiary on 22 June 2022, outlining its intention to operate services based at London's Gatwick Airport, initially to Newburgh/New York JFK, Fort Lauderdale, and Orlando airports, with services to Baltimore, Chicago/Rockford, Ontario, and San Francisco airports to follow. The airline subsequently received its AOC and operating licence from the UK CAA on 27 September 2022, and its foreign air carrier permit from the USDOT on 17 October 2022.

On 14 February 2023, parent company Norse Atlantic Airways announced that London Gatwick-based flights operated by the British subsidiary would launch in May 2023, with services to Orlando beginning on 25 May 2023, and Fort Lauderdale on 26 May 2023, however operations launched ahead of this date on 26 March 2023, when Norse Atlantic UK took over the operations of its parent company's route between London Gatwick and New York JFK.

== Destinations ==
Norse Atlantic UK operates in conjunction with its parent company Norse Atlantic Airways, and operates to destinations from its London Gatwick base on behalf of them.

== Fleet ==
As of August 2025, Norse Atlantic Airways UK operates an all-Boeing 787 fleet composed of the following aircraft:

Norse Atlantic UK fleet
Aircraft	In service	Orders	Passengers			Notes
Aircraft	In service	Orders	W	Y	Total	Notes
Boeing 787-9	4	—	56	282	338	
Total	4	—				

== Cabins and services ==
Identical to that of its parent company, Norse Atlantic UK operates its Boeing 787s with two classes of service, Premium and Economy classes.
