= Quota Count system =

Anti-noise system in the United Kingdom

Quota Count is a system used in the UK by London's Heathrow, Gatwick, Stansted and Birmingham airports to limit the amount of noise generated by aircraft movements at night time (23:30–06:00).

== Description ==
From 1962 until 1993, operations at Heathrow were subject to a simple limit on the number of aircraft movements that were allowed to take place during the night period.

In 1993 a new Quota Count system was introduced based on aircraft noise certification data. Each aircraft type is classified and awarded a quota count (QC) value depending on the amount of noise it generated under controlled certification conditions. The quieter the aircraft the smaller the QC value. Aircraft are classified separately for landing and take-off. Take-off quota count values are based on the average of the certificated flyover and sideline noise levels at maximum take-off weight, with 1.75 EPNdB added for Chapter 2 aircraft. Landing quota count values are based on the certificated approach noise level at maximum landing weight minus 9.0 EPNdB.

Aircraft were originally divided into six QC bands from 0.5 to 16, but following a review by the Department for Transport a seventh category – Quota Count 0.25 – was added in March 2007 and an eighth category – Quota Count 0.125 – in September 2018.

| Noise classification (effective perceived noise in decibels, EPNdB) | Quota Count |
|---|---|
| Below 81 | Exempt |
| 81–83.9 | 0.125 |
| 84–86.9 | 0.25 |
| 87–89.9 | 0.5 |
| 90–92.9 | 1 |
| 93–95.9 | 2 |
| 96–98.9 | 4 |
| 99–101.9 | 8 |
| Greater than 101.9 | 16 |

The quota count doubles with each increase of 3 dB which corresponds to an approximate doubling of noise power. However, due to the logarithmic nature of human aural perception, this 3 dB change is perceived as only a small change in the noise level.

Airports operating the system have a fixed quota for each of the summer and winter seasons. As each night-time aircraft movement takes place, an amount of this quota is used depending on the classification of the aircraft. For example, the Boeing 747-400 is classed as QC/2 on landing and QC/4 on takeoff, while the larger yet quieter Airbus A380 is rated QC/0.5 on landing and QC/2 on takeoff. Each A380 therefore uses approximately 42% of the quota of a 747, while potentially carrying more passengers, thus providing airlines with an incentive to operate quieter types of aircraft. Field measurements suggest the approach quota allocation for the A380 may be overly generous compared to the older Boeing 747. Rolls-Royce is supporting CAA in understanding the relatively high A380/Trent 900 monitored noise levels.

=== Some QC examples ===
| Aircraft type | Quota Count | |
| Aircraft type | Departure | Arrival |
|---|---|---|
| Airbus A320 family | 0.125–1 | 0.125–0.5 |
| Airbus A380 | 2 | 0.5 |
| Boeing 737 Classic | 0.25–0.5 | 1 |
| Boeing 747-400 | 4 | 2 |
| Boeing 747-8 | 2 | 1 |
| Boeing 757-200 | 0.5 | 0.25 |
| Boeing 767-300 | 1–2 | 1 |
| Boeing 777-200ER | 2 | 1 |
| Embraer 145 | 0.25 | 0.25 |

Subject to some limited carry-over provisions, when the airport's quota has been fully used up, no more night-time movements are allowed to take place. In practice, the airport spreads the quota so that it is used evenly across the season.

The quotas allocated to each airport operating the system are reduced periodically in order to achieve long-term reductions in the impact of night-time aircraft noise, the last such reduction having been in the Summer 2019 season.

London Heathrow Airport prohibits aircraft noisier than QC/2 to operate at night. As this is more stringent than the ICAO's Chapter 4 limits, QC/2 has become a de facto aircraft noise standard.

The Quota Count system has been adapted for use in Madrid, Brussels and Aberdeen.
