= The White Desert =

The White Desert may refer to:

- The White Desert (1925 film), an American silent drama film
- The White Desert (1922 film), a German silent adventure film

== See also ==
- White Desert National Park, a national park in Egypt
- White Desert (company), a British tour operator
