= WFR =

WFR may refer to:

- Weather Research and Forecasting model
- Wilderness First Responder
- MEMC Electronic Materials, based on its stock symbol on the New York Stock exchange
- The Worcestershire and Sherwood Foresters, an infantry regiment of the British army
- Work Force Reduction (or Work Force Restructuring), a euphemism for layoffs
- Wake Forest-Rolesville High School
- Wizard's First Rule
- Wolfs Fang Runway
