= Norwegian Long Haul =

Division of Norwegian Air Shuttle (2012–2021)

Norwegian Long Haul AS

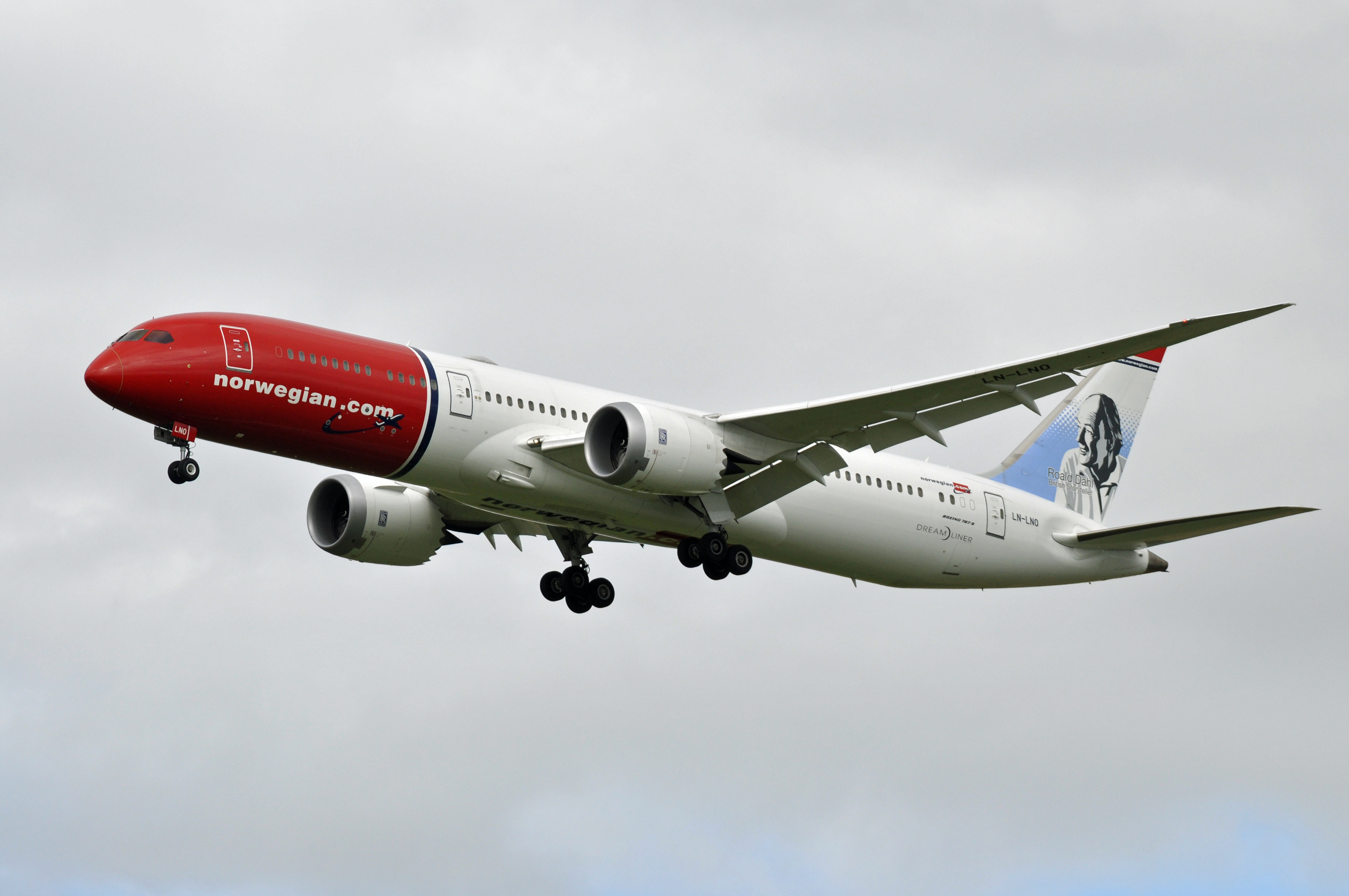
IATA	ICAO	Call sign
DU	NLH	NORSTAR
- Founded: 1 January 2012
- Commenced operations: 30 May 2013
- Ceased operations: 14 January 2021
- Operating bases: Bangkok–Suvarnabhumi; Barcelona; Fort Lauderdale; Los Angeles; New York–JFK; Paris–Charles de Gaulle; Rome–Fiumicino
- Frequent-flyer program: Norwegian Reward
- Parent company: Norwegian Air Shuttle
- Headquarters: Fornebu (Bærum), Norway
- Key people: Bjørn Kjos
- Website: www.norwegian.com

Norwegian Long Haul AS was a division of Norwegian Air Shuttle that operated long-haul flights between Europe, Asia, and North America. The airline's fleet consisted of the Boeing 787 Dreamliner. The airline was registered in Dublin, Ireland, and was managed by parent company Norwegian Air Shuttle from its head office at Fornebu, Norway. Its capacity was used to operate some of the long-haul flights within the route network of the collective Norwegian Group, which consisted of Norwegian Air Shuttle and its associated subsidiaries, with Norwegian Long Haul operating the flights using Norwegian Air Shuttle's associated airline codes.

The airline's first flight took place on 30 May 2013, which operated from Oslo Airport, Gardermoen to John F. Kennedy International Airport. Parent company Norwegian Air Shuttle announced on 14 January 2021 that it would terminate all of its long-haul flights, ending Norwegian Long Haul's operations following its initial suspension and fleet grounding in March 2020, in the wake of the COVID-19 pandemic and its impact on aviation.

== History ==
=== Formation and initial launch (2010–2013) ===
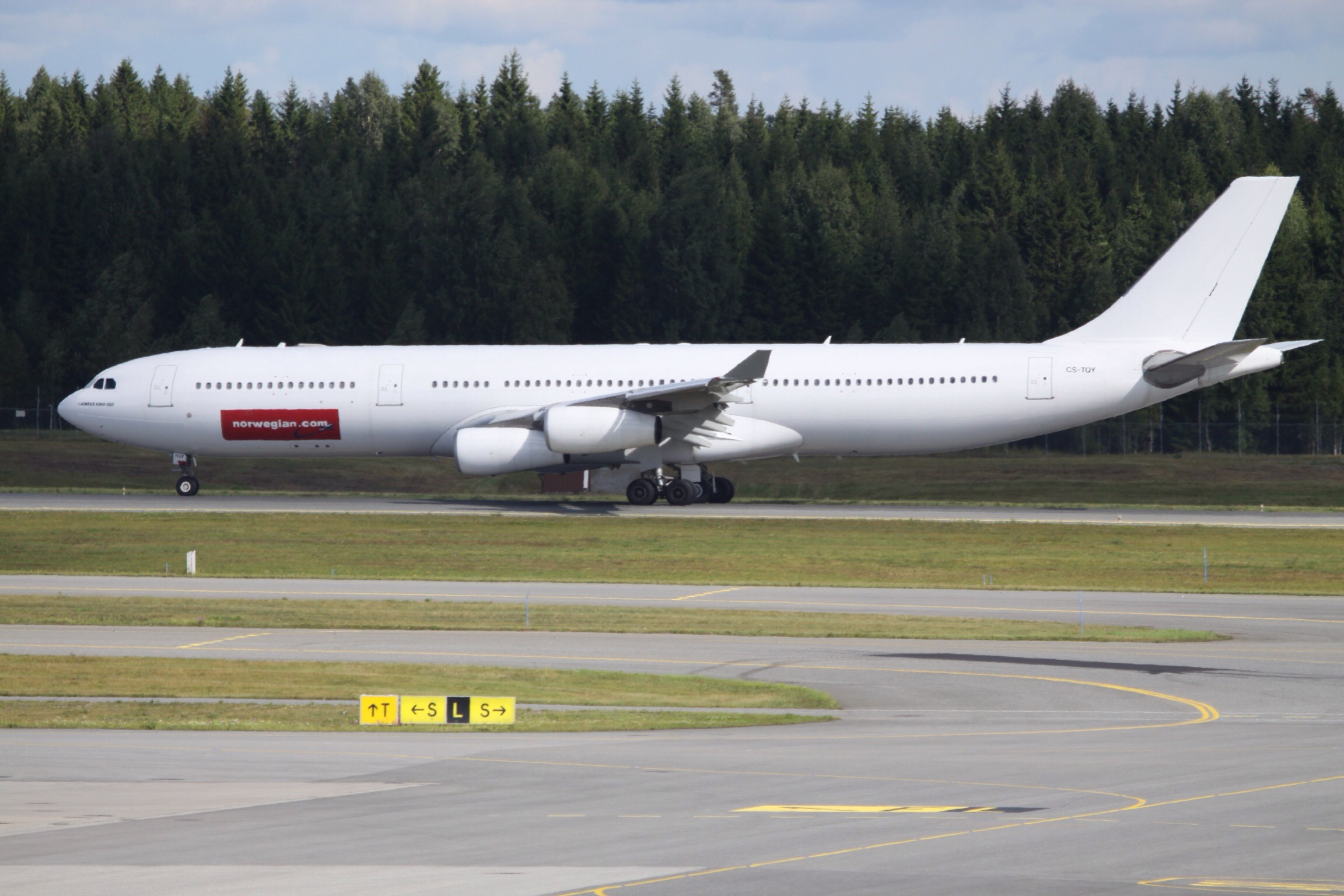
Norwegian wet-leased two Airbus A340-300s from Hi Fly (including the one pictured) to launch its planned long-haul services in May 2013, due to delays in the delivery of its first Boeing 787 Dreamliners.

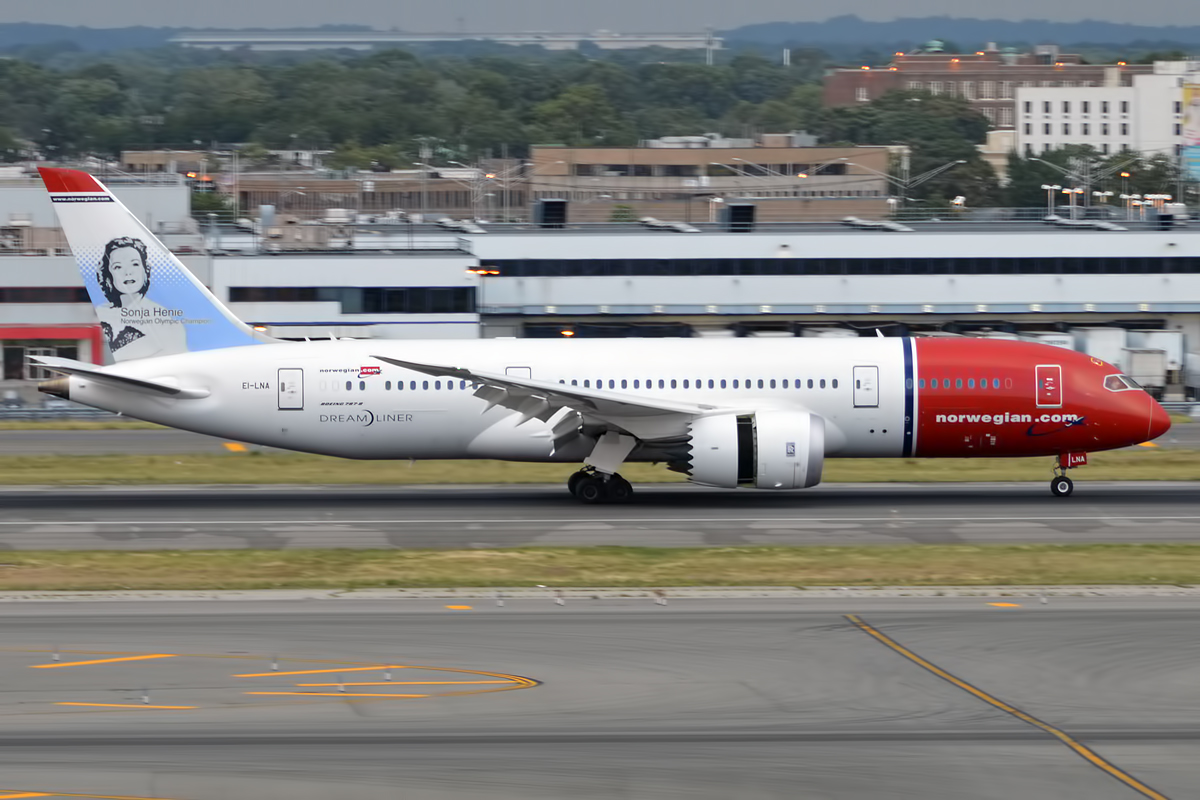
EI-LNA (later LN-LNA) was Norwegian's first Boeing 787-8, originally delivered on 28 June 2013.

Prior to Norwegian Long Haul's establishment as a company, Norwegian Air Shuttle, which would be the airline's parent company, announced on 8 November 2010 that it had chosen the Boeing 787 Dreamliner aircraft to operate its planned long-haul operations. The letter of intent consisted of two Boeing 787-8s to be leased through ILFC (later AerCap), and the first 787-8 was subsequently expected to be delivered during the autumn of 2012. On 26 May 2011, Norwegian Air Shuttle entered a letter of intent to acquire purchase rights from Icelandair for three additional Boeing 787-8s. In January 2012, Norwegian Long Haul was established as a subsidiary of Norwegian Air Shuttle in order to operate the planned long-haul services, and by this period Norwegian had six Boeing 787-8s on order for its long-haul operations. On 24 May 2012, Norwegian Air Shuttle announced an order for an additional two 787-8s, bringing the order to eight total units.

Two years following its initial letter of intent for its first Boeing 787 order, on 8 November 2012, Norwegian announced the opening of ticket reservations for its upcoming long-haul services, which consisted of flights from Oslo Gardermoen (Norway) and Stockholm Arlanda (Sweden) to New York JFK (United States) and Bangkok (Thailand), with the services announced to launch on 30 May 2013. However, in early 2013, various Boeing 787s began to experience issues with their batteries overheating and the resultant electrical fires, prompting a grounding of the worldwide Boeing 787 fleet which also further delayed deliveries of the type, including those of Norwegian's. On 5 March 2013, due to the possibility of the issues causing delivery delays that would threaten the planned launch of its long-haul services in May, Norwegian signed an agreement with Hi Fly to wet-lease two Airbus A340-300s to operate the services until Norwegian took delivery of the 787s. On 14 March 2013, prior to the inauguration of its long-haul services in May, Norwegian announced Copenhagen and Fort Lauderdale as two new destinations, with services to the new destinations (including from Oslo and Stockholm to Fort Lauderdale) scheduled to begin on 29 November 2013.

Norwegian's long-haul operations began on 30 May 2013 as previously announced, but initially with the wet-leased Airbus A340-300 aircraft while the airline still awaited delivery of its Boeing 787s. Following the inauguration of its long-haul services with the leased A340s, Norwegian announced on 5 June 2013 that its Boeing 787s would also operate on some intra-European flights from Oslo between 4 July and 4 August 2013, prior to the Boeing 787s taking over the long-haul services from the A340s. Norwegian subsequently received its first Boeing 787-8 on 28 June 2013, and entered it into service on its planned European flights on 4 July 2013. Norwegian's 787-8s took over the long-haul services from the leased A340s on 16 August 2013, beginning with the services from Stockholm to New York JFK, approximately two and a half months following the airline's inauguration of its long-haul services.

=== Aggressive expansion (2014–2019) ===
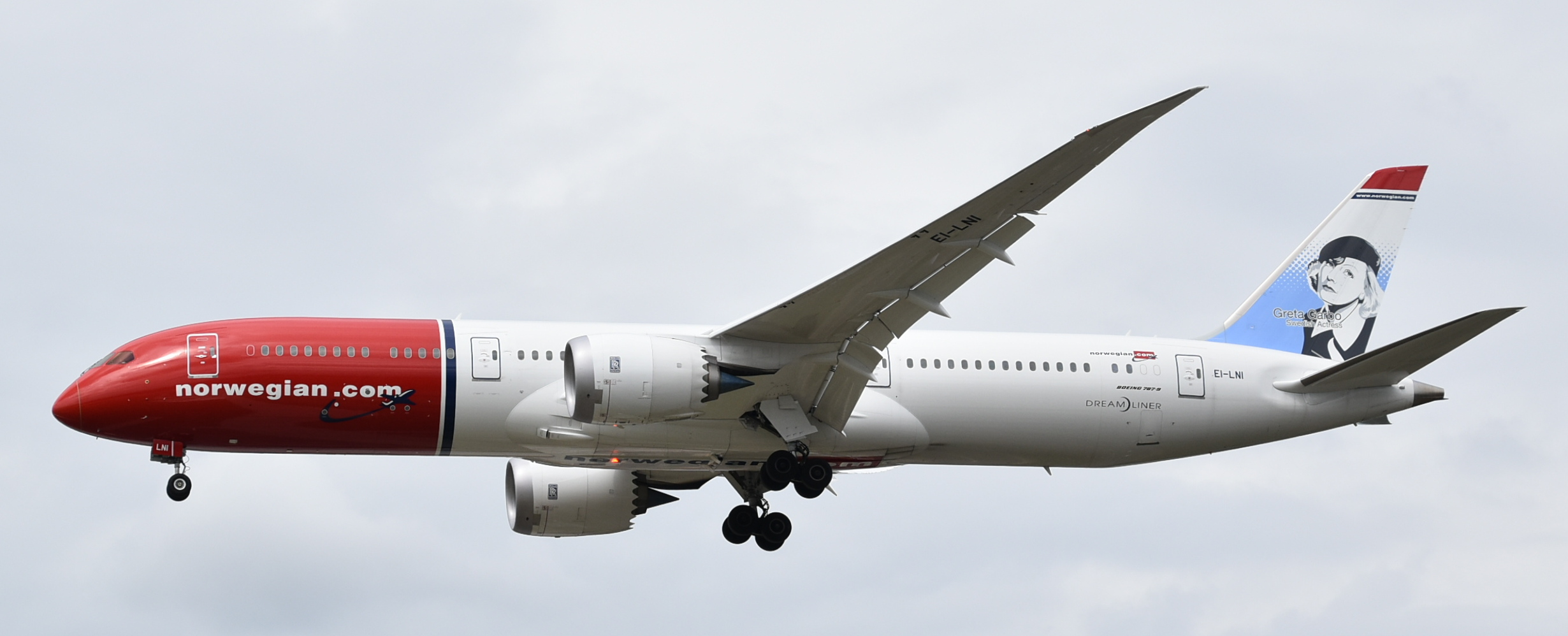
Norwegian ordered its first of the larger Boeing 787-9 variant in December 2013. The aircraft pictured, EI-LNI (later LN-LNI), was Norwegian's first 787-9 and was delivered on 24 February 2016.

On 3 September 2013, Norwegian announced the addition of three more destinations in the United States, consisting of Los Angeles, Oakland, and Orlando, with services from its Scandinavian destinations to gradually roll out between March and June 2014. In October 2013, Norwegian announced the airline's first European long-haul destination outside of Scandinavia, with flights from London Gatwick to New York, Los Angeles, and Fort Lauderdale, and that the services would commence in July 2014. On 18 December 2013, the airline announced that it had ordered two Boeing 787-9s through a lease agreement with MG Aviation, with the first 787-9 expected to arrive in early 2016. The following day, on 19 December 2013 the airline announced a weekly seasonal service between Bergen and New York JFK to begin operating during the 2014 summer season. Between February and May 2014, the airline had ordered an additional seven Boeing 787-9s, making for a total of nine 787-9s ordered.

In April 2015, the airline announced the beginning of flights to San Juan from Oslo, Copenhagen, Stockholm and London beginning in November 2015. Also announced were flights to St. Croix in the US Virgin Islands from Copenhagen beginning on 6 November 2015. Between August and October 2015, the airline ordered an additional 21 Boeing 787-9s, for a total of 30 787-9s ordered, before the airline received its first 787-9 on 24 February 2016. Between March and May 2016, the airline ordered a further four 787-9s, for a total of 34 787-9s ordered. In July 2016, the airline launched its second European long-haul destination outside of Scandinavia, with flights from Paris Charles de Gaulle to New York, Los Angeles and Fort Lauderdale. In September 2016, the airline announced flights from its third European long-haul destination outside of Scandinavia with flights from Barcelona to Los Angeles, Oakland and Newark in June 2017, and Fort Lauderdale in August 2017.

In April 2017, the airline announced flights from London to Seattle, Denver, and its second Asian long-haul destination, Singapore, to begin in September 2017. In May 2017, the airline announced flights from Rome to Newark and Los Angeles to begin in November 2017, and to Oakland in February 2018. In June 2017, the airline announced flights from London to Buenos Aires, also to begin in February 2018. In July 2017, the airline announced flights from London to Chicago and Austin to begin in March 2018, as well as flights from Paris Orly to Newark in February 2018, Paris Charles de Gaulle to Denver in April 2018, Oakland in April 2018, and Boston in May 2018. In December 2017, the airline announced the starting of flights from Amsterdam to New York in May 2018, from Milan Malpensa to Los Angeles in June 2018, and from Madrid to New York and Los Angeles in July 2018, however due to issues with the Rolls-Royce Trent 1000 engines equipped on the airline's Dreamliners and the resultant removal of aircraft from service to undergo maintenance, the services between Milan and Los Angeles were announced to be postponed to 2019, but ultimately never launched.

On 25 March 2018, Norwegian Air Shuttle transferred Norwegian Long Haul's services from London Gatwick to the United States to instead be operated by Norwegian Air UK, which had already taken over Norwegian's long-haul flights from London to Singapore and Buenos Aires, and proceeded to take over the announced services to Chicago and Austin. In July 2018, the airline announced new winter seasonal services to Krabi in Thailand from Oslo, Stockholm and Copenhagen to begin from October 2018. On 28 November 2018, the airline announced new seasonal routes from Boston to Rome and Madrid to begin in March and May 2019 respectively. On 15 February 2019, the airline announced Athens as a new destination with a seasonal route between New York JFK and Athens International Airport to begin in July 2019, as well as a new seasonal route between Barcelona and Chicago to begin in June 2019.

=== Slowed expansion, shuffling of operations, and eventual closure (2019–2021) ===
In July 2019, the airline announced it would relocate its year-round Barcelona and Paris services from Oakland International Airport to San Francisco International Airport in October 2019, while its seasonal services from Oakland International would remain. In October 2019, the airline announced it would discontinue service at Newark Liberty International Airport by moving its Barcelona and Rome services from the airport to instead operate from New York JFK by the end of the month, utilizing slots freed from changing its services to Stockholm and Copenhagen from New York to seasonal. Also in October 2019, the airline announced a new summer seasonal route between Paris and Austin to begin in May 2020, and in November 2019, the airline announced additional summer seasonal routes between Rome and Denver in March 2020, between Paris and Chicago in May 2020, and between Rome and Chicago in June 2020.

In November 2019, following a re-evaluation of the airline group's route network, the airline announced it would discontinue its long-haul flights from Copenhagen and Stockholm as well as its flights to Thailand after late-March 2020. The airline also announced in December 2019 that it would end operations at Oakland International Airport, consolidating its operations at San Francisco International Airport in April 2020.

In March 2020, Norwegian Long Haul's fleet of Boeing 787s as well as those of its sister companies Norwegian Air Sweden and Norwegian Air UK were stored and operations suspended due to the COVID-19 pandemic and its impact on aviation. On 27 April 2020, parent company Norwegian Air Shuttle announced the postponement of the airline's long-haul flights to March 2021, which included the operations of Norwegian Long Haul and the parent company's integrated subsidiaries. On 29 June 2020, orders for five Boeing 787-9s that were yet to be delivered to Norwegian were cancelled. In October 2020, operations for the airline were scheduled to resume from its Paris-Charles de Gaulle base in March 2021 to Los Angeles and New York JFK, and to Austin, Boston, Denver, and Orlando in May 2021, in anticipation of the pandemic's impacts subsiding.

In January 2021, however, Norwegian announced it would terminate all long-haul operations in order to refocus on its short-haul European route network.

=== Potential successor airline Norse Atlantic ===
One month following Norwegian's announcement to terminate all long-haul operations, Norse Atlantic Airways was founded in February 2021 by executives with former ties to Norwegian, including Bjørn Tore Larsen, former Norwegian chairman Bjørn Kise, and former Norwegian CEO Bjørn Kjos. During March 2021, Norse Atlantic announced that it planned to launch long-haul flights between Europe and the United States, and began securing leasing rights for most of Norwegian's former Boeing 787s. The airline received both its first Boeing 787-9 and its air operator's certificate in December 2021, ahead of its planned spring 2022 launch.

== Destinations ==
Norwegian Long Haul was serving, had formerly served, or was planning to serve or terminate the following destinations at the time its operations were initially suspended in March 2020, which was due to the impact of the COVID-19 pandemic on aviation. Limited operations were to gradually resume starting in March 2021 (with its launch of flights to Austin postponed to May 2021), however Norwegian Group's long-haul operations were announced in January 2021 to be discontinued. The list includes destinations served specifically by Norwegian Long Haul as part of Norwegian Group's collective route network, but does not actively list destinations operated to exclusively by sister subsidiary Norwegian Air UK, which took over long-haul operations based at London's Gatwick Airport starting in March 2018.

Country or Territory	City	Airport	Notes	Refs
Denmark	Copenhagen	Copenhagen Airport	Base; Terminated	
France	Paris	Charles de Gaulle Airport	Base	
France	Paris	Orly Airport	Terminated	
Greece	Athens	Athens International Airport	Seasonal	
Italy	Rome	Leonardo da Vinci–Fiumicino Airport	Base	
Netherlands	Amsterdam	Amsterdam Airport Schiphol		
Norway	Bergen	Bergen Airport, Flesland	Terminated	
Norway	Oslo	Oslo Airport, Gardermoen		
Puerto Rico	San Juan	Luis Muñoz Marín International Airport	Terminated	
Spain	Barcelona	Josep Tarradellas Barcelona–El Prat Airport	Base	
Spain	Madrid	Adolfo Suárez Madrid–Barajas Airport		
Sweden	Stockholm	Stockholm Arlanda Airport	Terminated	
Thailand	Bangkok	Suvarnabhumi Airport	Base; Terminated	
Thailand	Krabi	Krabi International Airport	Terminated	
United Kingdom	London	Gatwick Airport	Base; Terminated^{1}	
United States	Austin	Austin–Bergstrom International Airport	Seasonal; Was to begin 22 May 2021	
United States	Boston	Logan International Airport	Seasonal	
United States	Chicago	O'Hare International Airport	Seasonal	
United States	Denver	Denver International Airport	Seasonal	
United States	Fort Lauderdale	Fort Lauderdale–Hollywood International Airport	Base	
United States	Las Vegas	McCarran International Airport	Terminated	
United States	Los Angeles	Los Angeles International Airport	Base	
United States	New York City	John F. Kennedy International Airport	Base	
United States	Newark	Newark Liberty International Airport	Terminated	
United States	Oakland	Oakland International Airport	Terminated	
United States	Orlando	Orlando International Airport		
United States	San Francisco	San Francisco International Airport		
United States	Seattle	Seattle–Tacoma International Airport	Terminated^{1}	
United States Virgin Islands	Saint Croix	Henry E. Rohlsen Airport	Terminated	

Notes:
- ^1: Transferred to Norwegian Air UK.

=== Airline partnerships ===
Starting in 2018, Norwegian participated in a connection deal with easyJet and WestJet through the program Worldwide by easyJet. The program, established by easyJet in September 2017, allowed passengers to book connections between easyJet, Norwegian, and WestJet flights through London's Gatwick Airport via the airport's "GatwickConnects" service, and between easyJet and Norwegian flights at Paris Charles de Gaulle and Barcelona airports.

On 18 October 2019, JetBlue and Norwegian announced plans for an interlining agreement, which, if approved between the two airlines, would have came into effect during 2020. The partnership was to take advantage of each airline having substantial pre-existing presence at New York JFK, Boston, and Fort Lauderdale airports.

== Fleet ==
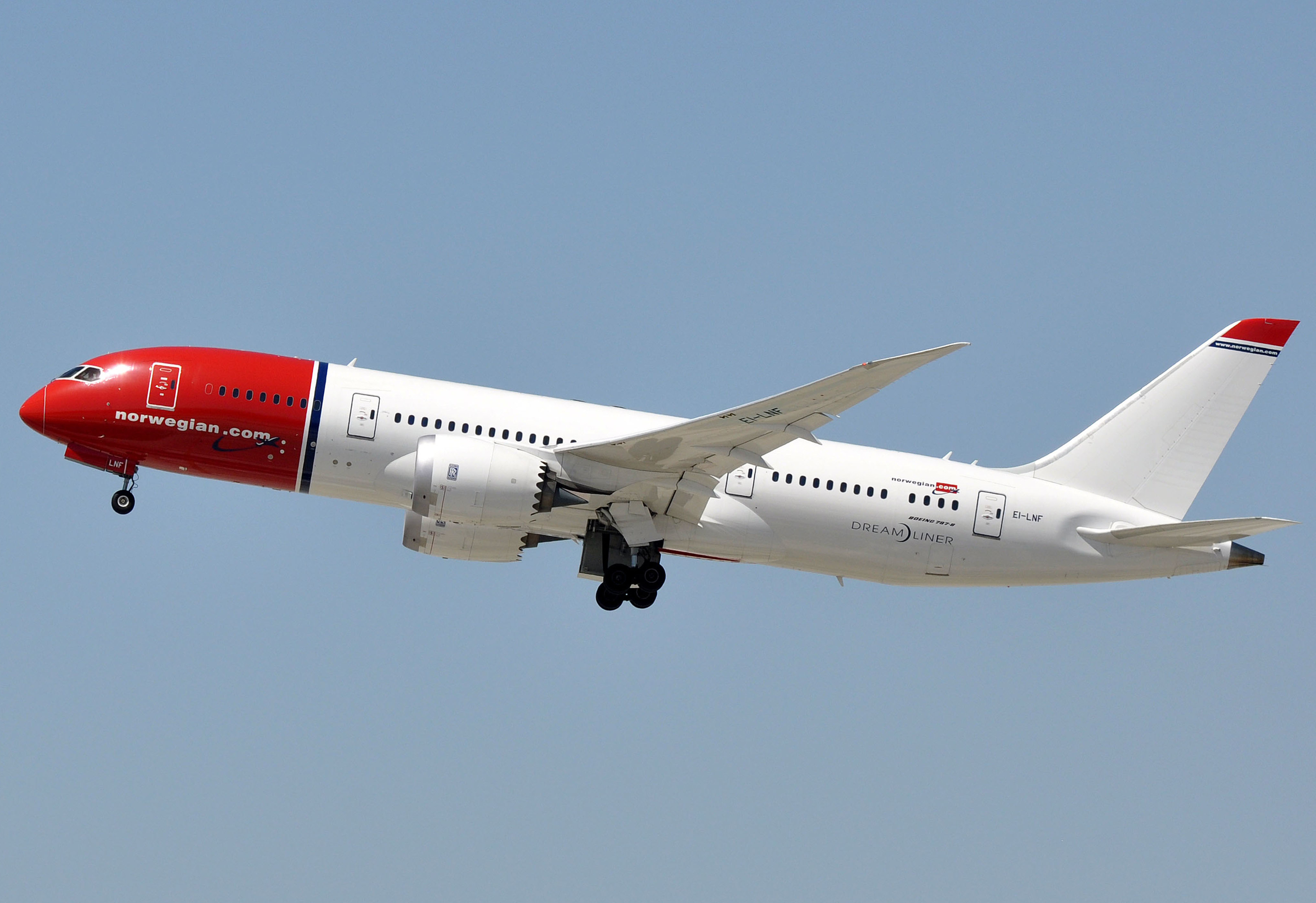
A Norwegian Long Haul Boeing 787-8

Norwegian Long Haul's fleet consisted of the following aircraft as of January 2021, following its initial storage in March 2020:

Norwegian Long Haul fleet
Aircraft	Number	Orders	Passengers			Notes
Aircraft	Number	Orders	W	Y	Total	Notes
Boeing 787-8	8	—	32	260	292	
Boeing 787-9	11	—	35	309	344	
Integrated long haul fleet
Boeing 787-9	3	—	56	282	338	Operated by Norwegian Air Sweden.
Boeing 787-9	3	—	35	309	344	Operated by Norwegian Air Sweden.
Boeing 787-9	13	—	56	282	338	Operated by Norwegian Air UK.
Total	35	—				

=== Fleet development ===
Norwegian Air Shuttle CEO Bjørn Kjos was in meetings with Polish politicians in April 2013 about the possible acquisition of LOT Polish Airlines, triggering speculation as to Norwegian Air Shuttle's interest in obtaining more Boeing 787 aircraft. During an interview with The Wall Street Journal in July 2014, Bjørn Kjos hinted at buying 20 more 787-9s, with deliveries from 2018, though the airline had refused to confirm this order plan. In October 2015, the airline confirmed that it had ordered 19 more 787-9 Dreamliners. The airline's Dreamliners were initially registered in Ireland and the Civil Aviation Authority of Norway had given Norwegian Air Shuttle a temporary exemption to operate foreign-registered aircraft. All of the 787-8s had since been re-registered in Norway, while the 787-9s were registered between Norway, Sweden, and the UK.

Between 2010 and 2016, Norwegian Group had accumulated orders for a total of 8 Boeing 787-8s and 34 787-9s, of which all of the 787-8s and 13 of the 787-9s were specifically allocated to Norwegian Long Haul. By June 2020, Norwegian had five remaining Boeing 787-9 aircraft on order, the orders of which were cancelled alongside the airline's remaining Boeing 737 MAX orders. In October 2020, leases for two of the airline's 787-9s were transferred to Italian airline Neos, reducing Norwegian Long Haul's fleet of 787-9s from 13 to 11.

== Cabin classes and services ==
=== Cabin classes ===
Boeing 787s operated by Norwegian Long Haul and other Norwegian Group airlines offered two classes of service, consisting of Premium Economy and Economy classes. Seats in the Premium Economy cabin were configured in a 2–3–2 layout, while seats in the Economy Class cabin were configured in a 3–3–3 layout. Premium Economy Class passengers had various amenities and services available complimentary, including meals, beverages, and checked or hold baggage, while the same amenities and services were available to Economy Class passengers for additional surcharges, like traditionally offered on other low-cost airlines.

=== In-flight entertainment ===
An in-flight entertainment system was equipped at every seat through personal screens, which were on the seatback in most Economy seats, or in the armrest in all Premium seats and some Economy seats. Video on demand and other digital media on the system was freely available to all passengers regardless of class of service, though passengers could also make additional purchases on the buy on board service through the system.

Starting in January 2019, Norwegian began to offer in-flight WiFi on its Boeing 787-9 aircraft.

== Criticism ==
=== Flight delays ===
From the airline's start-up in May 2013, 73 of 97 New York and Bangkok arrivals to Oslo were delayed through September 2013 and two of the aircraft were later grounded due to technical issues. Norwegian Long Haul was extensively criticized in the media for its delays and lack of care for their stranded passengers. The airline's replies to the criticism varied from deep apologies to neglect and blaming of the aircraft manufacturer and maintenance sub-contractors. Several different sources claimed Norwegian used too tight fleet schedules with its small and new fleet of Boeing Dreamliners, having used only three aircraft for three different continents, but the airline disagreed. One of the airline's own technical employees and head of Aircraft Engineers International, Norway, was later threatened by the airline with job termination for publicly answering to the cause of the numerous delays with the airline's Dreamliners as a calculated risk by Norwegian Long Haul.

Norwegian Long Haul wet-leased two Airbus A340-300s from Hi Fly in 2013, but still reached its peak of delays at the end of the year, with a 24-hour delay on its New York – Oslo route. In early January 2014, Norwegian denied using their new Dreamliners beyond their operational capabilities and noted that they had set punctuality as their goal for 2014. However, by May 2014, Norwegian Long Haul passengers had experienced several flight delays lasting between 13 and 30 hours.

=== Labour related issues ===
Against recommendations of the largest aircraft attendant's union in Norway, the Parat union, Norwegian inquired the Norwegian government in 2012 with threats to flag out abroad and demands for rights to hire Asian (non-EU) flight and cabin crew without Norwegian work and residence permits. CEO Bjørn Kjos claimed Norwegian [country] flight crews were too expensive for international routes and the airline later stated it would be able to secure jobs in Norway with such rights, although the union itself was not given insight to the specific inquiry made by the airline. The largest umbrella organization of labour unions in Norway, the Norwegian Confederation of Trade Unions, threatened to boycott the airline if Norwegian's enquired rights was granted by the Norwegian government.

The permits were not given to the airline and Norwegian obtained Irish registrations for its intercontinental operations as a different, separated airline enabling them to hire Thai cabin attendants through an employment agency (Adecco) in Thailand. This was perceived by the Parat union, the Norwegian Confederation of Trade Unions, the Minister of Labour and the Labour Party as social dumping, deliberately undermining Norwegian work rights. With the intercontinental airliners now registered in Ireland, rejected by the airline as a flag out as previously threatened, the airline focused its response to the political and labor union related criticism by comparing the salaries of the crew members to the total salary average in the country of the hired attendants. In October 2013, the Norwegian Confederation of Trade Unions revealed it would not extend its business agreement with Norwegian.

=== Aircraft wet-leases ===
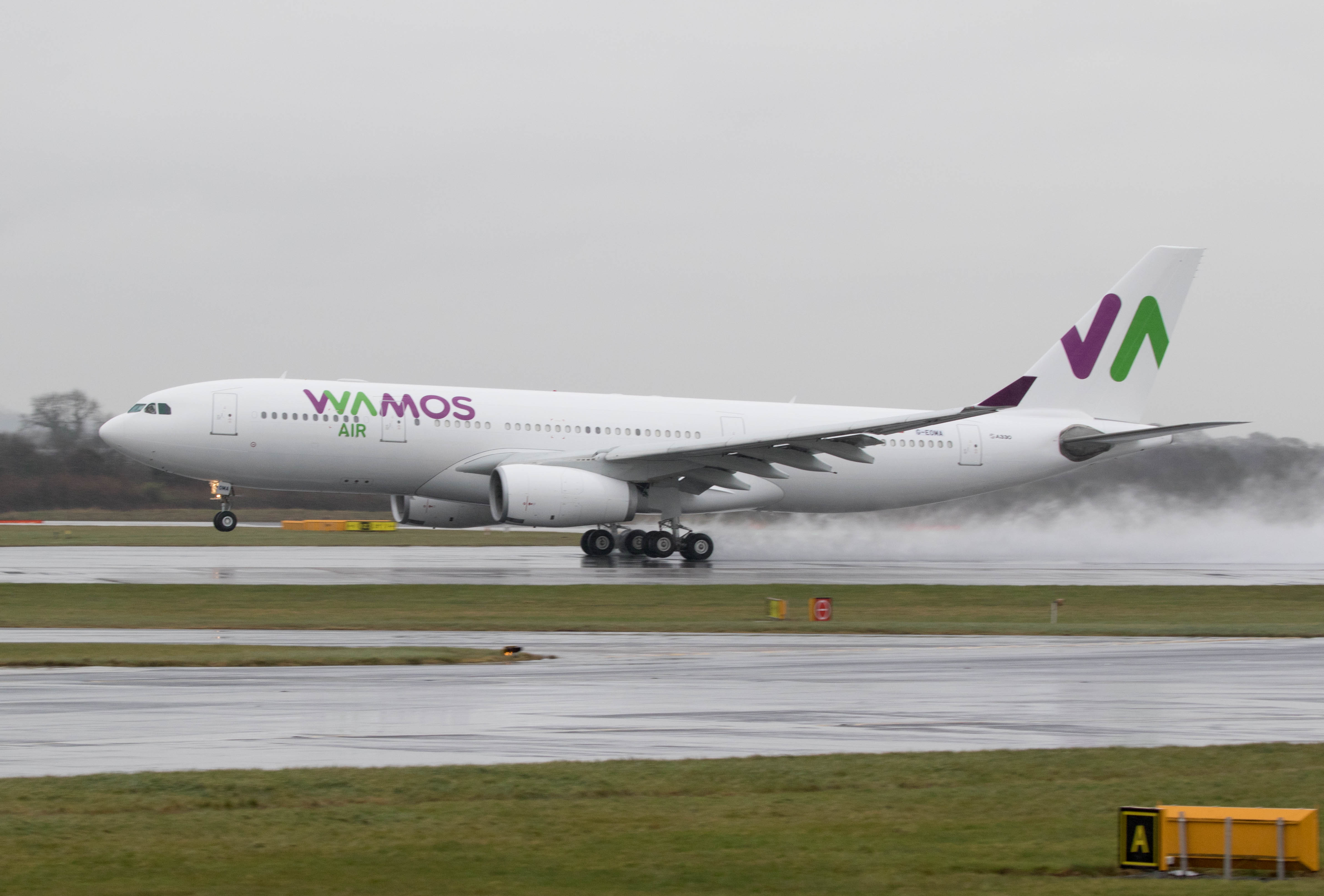
Norwegian, particularly between 2017 and 2019, wet-leased aircraft, such as Airbus A330s from Wamos Air similar to the one pictured, to operate its long-haul flights during periods when some of its Boeing 787s were out of service.

Throughout different points in Norwegian Long Haul's history from the launch of its long-haul services in 2013 and through to 2019, Norwegian had wet-leased aircraft on demand from various charter operators when it had an insufficient amount of operational or spare Boeing 787s to carry out its intended flight schedule, whether from delivery delays, issues with the Rolls-Royce Trent 1000 engines on its fleet, or other incidents that rendered portions of its fleet out of service when needed. Some notable examples of aircraft and operators chartered included the Airbus A330-200 and Boeing 747-400 from Wamos Air, the Airbus A330-300 from Evelop Airlines, the Airbus A340-300 and A340-500 from Hi Fly, and the Airbus A380-800 from Hi Fly Malta.

The chartered airlines would operate the flights with their aircraft on behalf of Norwegian, which in turn for Norwegian alleviated the risks and expenses involved if the airline instead cancelled flights; the cancellations of which could also inconvenience travelers and potentially require further reaccommodation and compensation. Norwegian as a result would still draw criticism from customers and the media, particularly those expecting to travel on the airline's Boeing 787s, which the airline had marketed as modern and with extensive in-flight entertainment options and WiFi connectivity. In comparison, customer experiences on the resultant substitute aircraft would differ or be lacking in various aspects, prompting apologies from Norwegian, and allowing affected passengers to change flights or travel plans with the airline. A spokesperson for Norwegian added that the airline scaled back its operations to eliminate the need to wet-lease aircraft by the winter 2019-2020 season.

== Incidents and accidents ==
- On 10 August 2019, Norwegian Long Haul Flight 7115 from Rome Fiumicino to Los Angeles International Airport operated by a Boeing 787-8 (registered as LN-LND), had an engine failure after departure during the initial climb. Falling engine debris hit at least 25 vehicles, 12 houses, and one person on the ground. The aircraft returned to Fiumicino airport for a safe landing after 23 minutes. None of the 298 passengers and crew on board the aircraft were injured.
