= White Desert (company) =

British tour operator

White Desert Ltd.
- Type: Private
- Industry: Hospitality industry; Travel technology; Extreme tourism
- Founded: 15 December 2005; 20 years ago
- Founder: Robyn Woodhead; Patrick Woodhead
- Headquarters: London, England, United Kingdom
- Number of employees: 80 (2021), 200 during Nov-Feb season
- Website: www.white-desert.com

White Desert Ltd. is a British tour operator conducting expeditions to Antarctica from Cape Town, South Africa. As of 2021, it is the only company to offer a commercial private jet service to the continent. Its Whichaway Camp is described by multiple publications as Antarctica's first and only hotel.

== History ==
White Desert was founded in December 2005 in London, England by polar explorers Patrick Woodhead and his then-wife Robyn Woodhead, with the goal of "making [Antarctica] accessible to everyone, not just explorers." Built in 2012 on the Schirmacher Oasis, The primary location, Whichaway Camp (70º 48’ 00” S 11º 23’ 00” E), consists of several guest "pods" that respectively contain bedrooms, bathrooms, dining rooms, and a library, heated by solar power. The camp underwent extensive renovations in 2016. It is intended to be removed entirely from the site at the end of its natural lifespan. A second location, Echo Camp (71°32'47" S 8°50'11" E), consisting of six hi-tech pods which can also accommodate up to 12 people, was added in 2022.

A maximum of 12 guests per group are flown from Cape Town, South Africa, to Whichaway Camp, the primary base camp located in Queen Maud Land, Antarctica, via various private aircraft. Flights operate into and out of Wolf's Fang Runway (71º 32’ 00” S 8º 50’ 00” E), which also has a smaller transitional camp serving as a logistical hub for incoming and departing trips. In 2017, British explorer Hamish Harding worked with White Desert to introduce the first regular business jet service to the Antarctic. On 2 November 2021, a HiFly Airbus A340-300 (9H-SOL) landed on Wolf's Fang Runway on a flight from Cape Town, becoming the largest aircraft to ever land there and the first Airbus A340 to land in Antarctica.

The company organises excursions to nearby natural sites, including ice rivers, ice caves, guided glacier and Nunatak (glacial island) hikes. Guests have the opportunity to also visit Emperor penguin colonies and undertake trips to the Geographic South Pole. The company operates only from November to January due to Antarctica's harsh climate during the rest of the year. The camp structures themselves remain on site during the off-season months, but are secured against the weather.

Several publications have noted the company's luxury status and exclusivity. As of the 2025-26 season, prices listed by the company range from $15,950 (USD) per person for one-day excursions, to $71,500 to $110,000 for week-long trips, reflecting the logistical and transportation expenses of accommodating guests in Antarctica.

The company dedicates 50% of its logistics to transporting scientists to their bases. There are a total of 70 permanent research bases on Antarctica, governed by the Antarctic Treaty System, which designates the continent as a scientific preserve.

White Desert is a member of the International Association of Antarctica Tour Operators.

== Awards and recognition ==
- World Travel Award for Leading Polar Expedition Operator five times (2012, 2014-2017)
- Elite Traveler included the company in its list of the top 50 adventures of 2017
- Condé Nast Traveler Readers’ Choice Awards in both 2023 and 2024
- Robb Report’s 50 Best Hotels, 2024
- In 2024, White Desert was featured in TIME magazine’s list of The World’s Greatest Places
- Modern Luxury's Best Antarctic Adventure Outfitter, 2025
- In 2025, Echo Camp was listed as one of Elite Traveler’s Top 100 Suites
