= Global Airlines =

Virtual airline of the United Kingdom

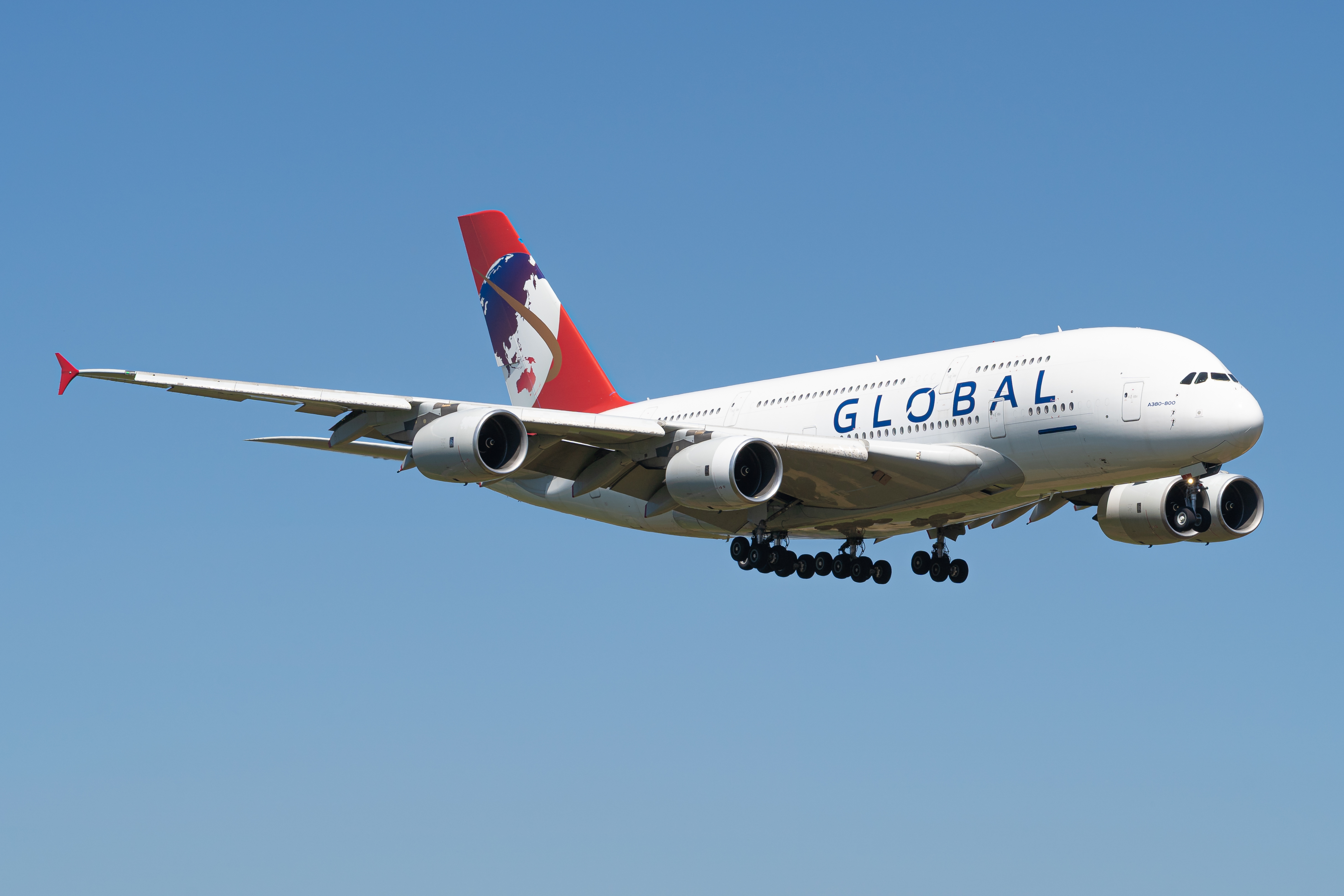
- The Global Airlines Airbus A380
- Founded: 13 July 2019; 7 years ago
- Commenced operations: 15 May 2025; 17 months ago
- Ceased operations: 4 November 2026; 10 days ago
- Fleet size: 1
- Parent company: Holiday Swap
- Headquarters: London, England
- Key people: James Asquith (CEO)
- Website: www.globalairlines.com

Global Airlines Limited was a British virtual airline that had planned to acquire a fleet of four Airbus A380 aircraft. The company purchased its sole aircraft in May 2023 and claimed to be the first new Airbus A380 owner in eight years. The company initially proposed to operate its aircraft with five classes of service including an uncertified "Gamer class", but later announced a conventional three-class cabin configuration.

The company operated its first flight, from Glasgow to New York-JFK, on 15 May 2025, under a damp lease contract with Hi Fly Malta. Following a mixed response, reports emerged that a Saudi investment fund might take a stake in the company, which would become an ACMI operator.

After only four transatlantic flights, the single aircraft owned by the airline was placed into long-term storage in Tarbes, France on 16 July 2025, with no known return-to-service date. On 4 November 2026, Global Airlines was ordered into compulsory liquidation by the Insolvency and Companies Court.

== Corporate affairs ==
The company was created by James Asquith, the founder of online travel company Holiday Swap. The company had hired consultants including Richard Stephenson, former communications director for the UK Civil Aviation Authority and Virgin Orbit investor Matthew Brown. Richard Stephenson resigned as a director of Global Airlines Ltd on 21 March 2025.

The company had not acquired an air operator's certificate or a UK Foreign Carrier Permit. Its first flight, from Glasgow to New York-JFK, was operated on 15 May 2025 under a damp lease contract with Hi Fly Malta. According to Companies House, the nature of the company's business is as "Agents involved in the sale of machinery, industrial equipment, ships and aircraft".

At the end of May 2025, reports emerged that the business model could change following the mixed response to the four initial flights. Saudi investors were reportedly in negotiations to acquire a substantial stake in Global Airlines, which would acquire its own Aircraft Operators Certificate and become an ACMI operator rather than running scheduled operations. Global Airlines stated that it was "not planning to change any strategy" and retained its goal of becoming a scheduled airline.

== Destinations ==
Global Airlines had no scheduled destinations. In March 2025, the company announced its intent to operate its first charter flight on 15 May between Glasgow Airport and John F. Kennedy International Airport in New York. The company announced a 'VIP Pre-Sale' for its first flights in March before revealing ticket prices one month later. Tickets were sold by GA.FLIGHTS who are trading under TravelOpedia Ltd that have teamed up with Global and Hi Fly Malta. The first flight was operated on 15 May 2025.

The company's A380 remained parked in New York for four days before returning to Glasgow on 19 May. After the first flights, the company operated another one-time service between Manchester Airport and New York on 21 May.

Following these four flights, the aircraft was repositioned to Dresden for maintenance, then ferried to Tarbes for storage prior to heavy maintenance, with no future operations scheduled. It was planned to be flown from Tarbes to Dresden for heavy maintenance work.

In June 2026, it was reported that the airline planned to launch direct flights from the UK to the Maldives before the end of the year. The flights did not materialize before the airline was liquidated in November 2026.

== Fleet ==
Aircraft	In service	Orders	Notes
Airbus A380-800	1	—	9H-GLOBL
Total	1	—	

Hi Fly Malta is the registered operator of 9H-GLOBL, a former China Southern A380 acquired in May 2023. In November 2023, the company announced a maintenance and refurbishment contract with JETMS, a Lithuanian company that is certified to repair small executive jets and narrow-body regional aircraft. The following month, it announced the appointment of Factorydesign as its 'cabin design partner'.

== See also ==
- List of airlines of the United Kingdom
