= Norwegian Air UK =

Airline of the United Kingdom (2015–2021)

IATA	ICAO	Call sign
DI	NRS	REDNOSE
- Founded: 12 March 2015
- Commenced operations: 28 September 2017
- Ceased operations: 22 March 2020
- AOC #: GB 2434
- Operating bases: Gatwick Airport
- Frequent-flyer program: Norwegian Reward
- Parent company: Norwegian Air Shuttle
- Headquarters: Gatwick Airport, Crawley, England, United Kingdom
- Key people: Bjørn Kjos
- Website: www.norwegian.com

Norwegian Air UK Ltd. was a British airline and a fully integrated subsidiary of low-cost airline Norwegian Air Shuttle, using its corporate identity. The airline operated Boeing 787-9 aircraft on scheduled services between Europe, Asia, and the Americas from its base at Gatwick Airport, south of London. In January 2020, Norwegian Air Shuttle announced it would cease all long-haul operations, which included those of Norwegian Air UK.

== History ==
In November 2015, the British civil aviation authorities issued Norwegian Air UK its air operator's certificate (AOC), and a single Boeing 737-800 was subsequently registered to the airline. The following month, the airline applied to the United States Department of Transportation (USDOT) for an exemption and a permit to begin flights to the country. In June 2016 however, the USDOT denied Norwegian Air UK's request for an exemption, which would have allowed the airline to start flights to the United States while its foreign air-carrier permit (FACP) remained under review. Meanwhile, the department placed the airline's application for a FACP on hold. The USDOT stated that it needed more time to review issues raised by various labour unions, such as the claim that Norwegian Air UK would violate labour laws by employing flight crew based in East Asia. In July 2017, the USDOT approved Norwegian Air UK's application for its foreign air-carrier permit, citing the airline's commitments to hire crew based in the United States and the European Union.

The airline's first services under its own AOC and IATA/ICAO codes (DI and NRS) were from Oslo Gardermoen to Barcelona, Málaga and Nice in September 2017, prior to its regularly scheduled services from London Gatwick to Singapore later that month and from London Gatwick to Buenos Aires Ezeiza in February 2018. From 25 March 2018, the airline began operating the rest of the Norwegian Group's long haul routes from London Gatwick to the United States, which were previously operated by Norwegian Long Haul on behalf of parent company Norwegian Air Shuttle. On 25 June 2018, the airline announced that flights from London Gatwick to Austin and Seattle that were originally scheduled as year-round services were to be reduced to summer seasonal services, but a new service was also announced: to Tampa from London Gatwick, as the first new US destination from London following the transfer of Norwegian Long Haul's US services. Further changes and additions to the airline's operations were announced on 27 November 2018, consisting of the relocation of its services at Fort Lauderdale and Oakland airports to Miami and San Francisco airports respectively, and the launch date of a new service to Rio de Janeiro from London, with the changes occurring on 31 March 2019. The airline's new service to Rio de Janeiro replaced its existing service to Singapore, which ended during January 2019. Reductions to the airline's route network continued, when the airline in July 2019 announced further cuts to three of its destinations in the US, with its year-round services to Chicago O'Hare and Denver reduced to summer seasonal, and that its winter seasonal service to Las Vegas would not resume.

In March 2020, the airline's fleet, along with much of the fleet of its associated parent and sister companies, was placed into storage due to the reduction in travel demand as a result of the COVID-19 pandemic and its impact on aviation. A limited number of the airline's London Gatwick-based operations were scheduled to resume starting in December 2020 in anticipation of the pandemic's impacts subsiding, but by October this was pushed to March 2021. The planned resumption of operations from its London Gatwick base consisted of flights to Boston, Denver, Los Angeles, Miami, New York JFK, Orlando, and San Francisco in March 2021, and from London to Austin in May 2021. However, in January 2021 Norwegian announced that its long-haul operations, which included those of Norwegian Air UK, would not be continued, and that the UK subsidiary would be put into liquidation. The airline's AOC was revoked voluntarily on 1 November 2021.

== Destinations ==
Norwegian Air UK was serving or had formerly served the following destinations prior to the initial suspension of its operations in March 2020 due to the impact of the COVID-19 pandemic on aviation. Limited operations were to gradually resume starting in March 2021, however Norwegian Group's long-haul operations were announced in January 2021 to be discontinued.

Country	City	Airport	Remarks	Refs
Argentina	Buenos Aires	Ministro Pistarini International Airport		
Brazil	Rio de Janeiro	Rio de Janeiro/Galeão International Airport		
Singapore	Singapore	Changi Airport	Terminated	
United Kingdom	London	Gatwick Airport	Base	
United States	Austin	Austin–Bergstrom International Airport	Seasonal	
United States	Boston	Logan International Airport		
United States	Chicago	O'Hare International Airport	Seasonal	
United States	Denver	Denver International Airport	Seasonal	
United States	Fort Lauderdale	Fort Lauderdale–Hollywood International Airport	Terminated	
United States	Las Vegas	Harry Reid International Airport	Terminated	
United States	Los Angeles	Los Angeles International Airport		
United States	Miami	Miami International Airport		
United States	New York City	John F. Kennedy International Airport		
United States	Oakland	Oakland International Airport	Terminated	
United States	Orlando	Orlando International Airport		
United States	San Francisco	San Francisco International Airport		
United States	Seattle	Seattle–Tacoma International Airport	Seasonal	
United States	Tampa	Tampa International Airport		

== Cabin classes and services ==
Like its sister subsidiaries under parent Norwegian Air Shuttle, Norwegian Air UK operated its Boeing 787s with two classes of service, consisting of Premium Economy and Economy classes. Though compared to many of the other 787-9s operated between its sister subsidiaries, the British subsidiary's aircraft starting in 2018 were configured with additional Premium seats and fewer Economy seats.

== Fleet ==
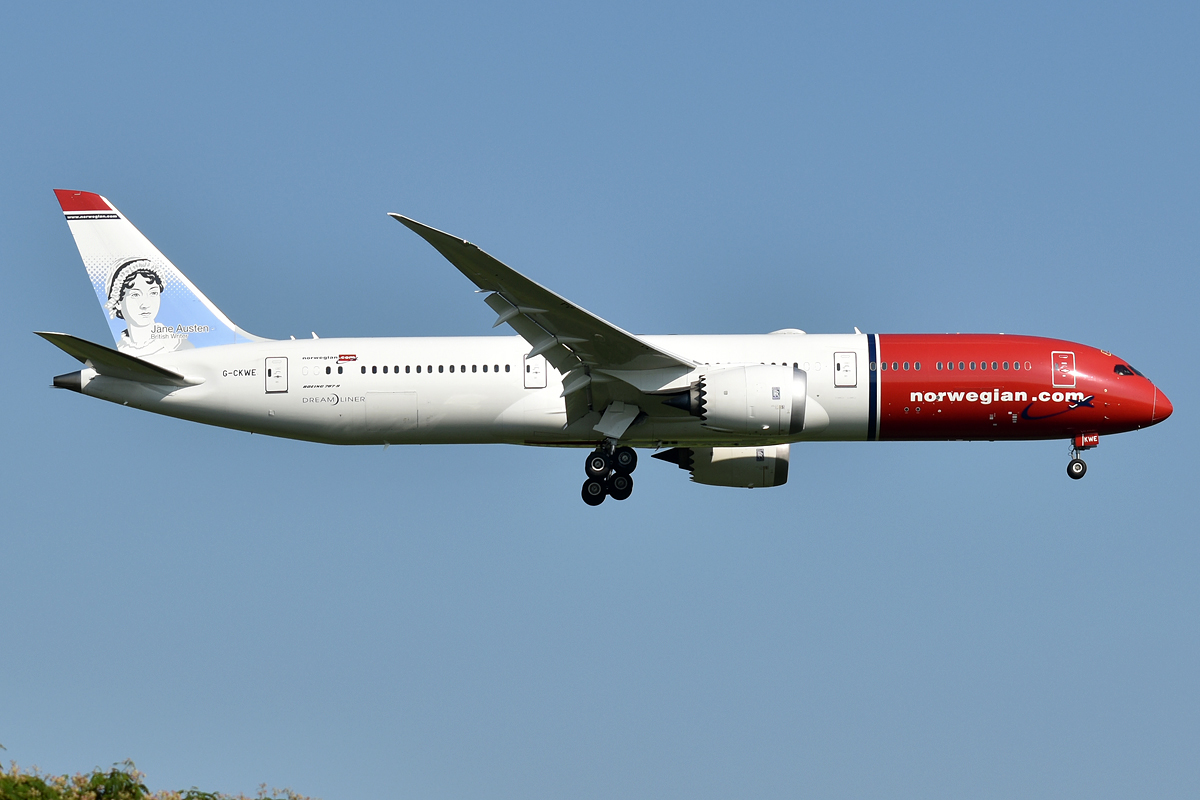
Boeing 787-9

As of January 2021, Norwegian Air UK's fleet comprised the following aircraft, after its initial storage on 21 March 2020:

Aircraft	Total	Orders	Passengers			Remarks
Aircraft	Total	Orders	W	Y	Total	Remarks
Boeing 787-9	13	—	56	282	338	
Total	13	—				

=== Historical fleet ===
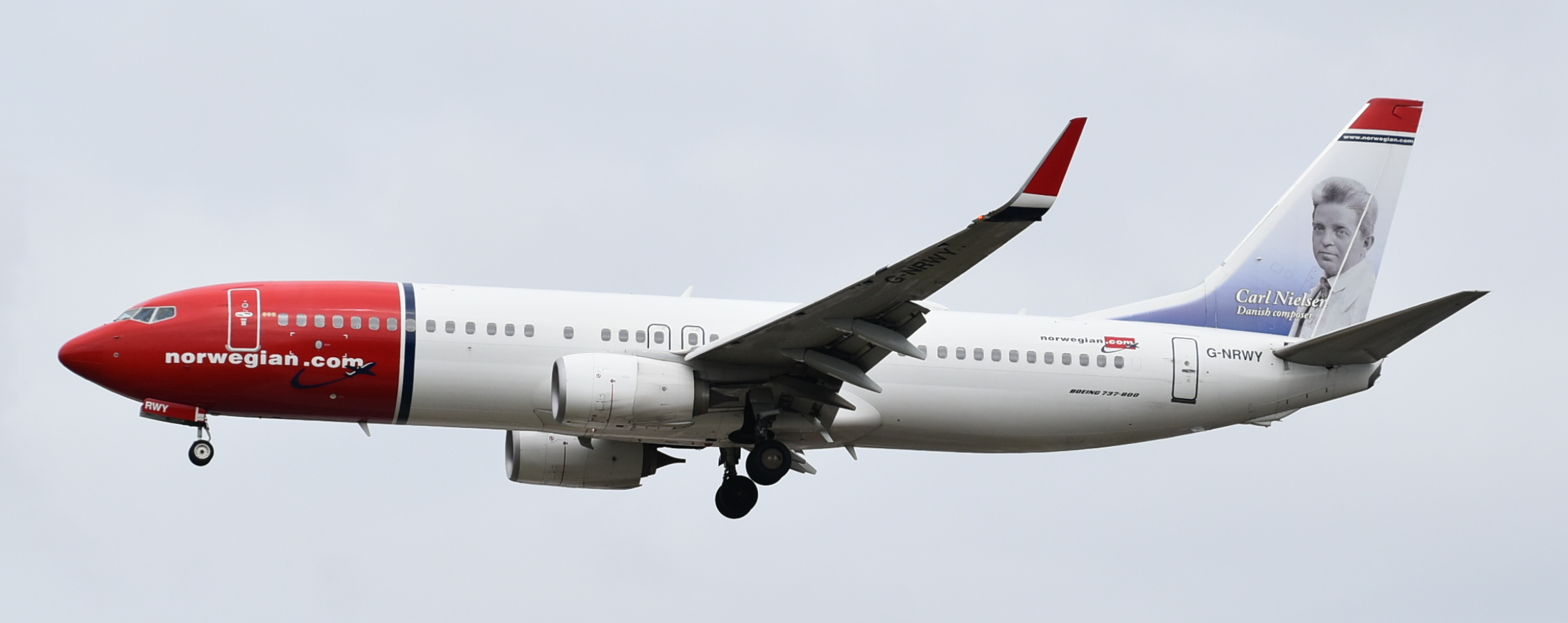
Boeing 737-800

Norwegian Air UK had previously operated the following aircraft types:

Aircraft	Total	Introduced	Retired	Remarks
Boeing 737-800	1	2015	2019	
Boeing 777-200	1	2019	2019	Transferred to Privilege Style.

=== Fleet development ===
When Norwegian Air UK was founded in 2015, a Boeing 737-800 was transferred to the airline from its Irish sister subsidiary Norwegian Air International, the aircraft of which operated flights on behalf of the Irish subsidiary until it was transferred to Norwegian Air Shuttle in March 2019.

Between 2017 and 2018, some of the Boeing 787-9s originally ordered for Norwegian Long Haul were instead initially delivered to Norwegian Air UK, with 11 such aircraft either subsequently transferred back to Norwegian Long Haul or to Norwegian Air Sweden between 2017 and 2019. A total of 13 787-9s delivered to Norwegian Air UK starting in February 2018 were retained by the airline for its own operations, until the initial suspension of its operations in March 2020 and eventual closure in January 2021. One additional 787-9 was produced and intended for the British subsidiary, but was never delivered by the time Norwegian Group's long-haul flights were terminated

== See also ==
- List of defunct airlines of the United Kingdom
