= Patrick Woodhead =

British polar adventurer and entrepreneur

- Born: Patrick Woodhead; 1975 (age 50–51); England
- Occupations: Adventurer, entrepreneur, author
- Known for: World record-holding crossings of Antarctica and Greenland. Owner of White Desert.
- Website: https://white-desert.com

Patrick Woodhead (born 1975) is an English polar adventurer, entrepreneur and author. He currently runs White Desert, a company that arranges luxury adventures into the interior of the Antarctic.

== Early life and expeditions ==
After completing a university degree in philosophy and ancient history, Woodhead traveled extensively. For a period of 8–10 years he alternately took jobs as a ski instructor in Canada, a park ranger in Namibia, explored unclimbed mountains in Krygistan, and went on expeditions in the Amazon and Congo.

Despite having no previous polar experience, in 2002, at the age of 27 he and fellow adventurers Tom Avery, Andy Gerber, and polar guide Paul Landry, made a trek across Antarctica from the edge of the continent near the Patriot Hills camp to the South Pole in 46 days. The expedition used snowkiting when possible to aid the trip.

In 2004 Woodhead led the first ever east to west traverse of Antarctica, covering 1850 km in a total of 75 days. Woodhead stated that before that time only 11 people had done a full traverse of the continent.

In May 2015, Woodhead was part of a team that accomplished the fastest horizontal coast-to-coast crossing of Greenland, making the crossing in 9 days, 19 hours, and 40 minutes. The team was led by Tom Avery, and included Andy Gerber and George Wells. The weather was severe at the end of the trip, and Wells lost eight toes to frostbite.

Woodhead is a Prince’s Trust ambassador and a fellow of the Royal Geographical Society.

== White Desert ==
While on the 2004 expedition in Antarctica, Woodhead and his then-wife Robyn developed the idea of establishing an adventure camp in Antarctica that catered to exploring the continent's interior. Prior to that, the only real tourist opportunity for seeing the continent was from the periphery, in cruise ships. In 2005 they established the White Desert company, which offers luxury lodging on the continent. The facilities have since expanded to three camps, which operate during the Antarctic summer (November to February). As of 2025 the company had 115 employees, from 17 different countries. Flights to the continent leave from Cape Town, South Africa.

Woodhead has stressed the importance of preserving the natural conditions of the continent. He states that White Desert has been carbon neutral since 2007, they were the first operator on the continent to use Sustainable Aviation Fuel for their planes, and they use solar air heaters in their living pods. He has stated that everything they use is biodegradable, and all waste is sent back to South Africa for processing.

White Desert devotes 50% of its logistics to transporting scientists to their bases on the continent. Woodhead has also spoken about the importance of upholding and renewing the Antarctic Treaty System, agreements signed by 58 countries to maintain the neutral, scientific, non-military nature of the continent.

== Books ==
Woodhead is the author of four books:

Misadventures in a White Desert (2003). Story of South Pole expedition. ISBN 978-0340828106

The Cloud Maker (2009). Novel. ISBN 978-1848091153

The Secret Chamber (2011). Novel. ISBN 978-1848090781

Beneath the Ice (2015). Novel. ISBN 978-1848090798

== Personal life ==
Woodhead has two children with his ex-wife Robyn.
