= Hi Fly (airline) =

Portuguese charter airline

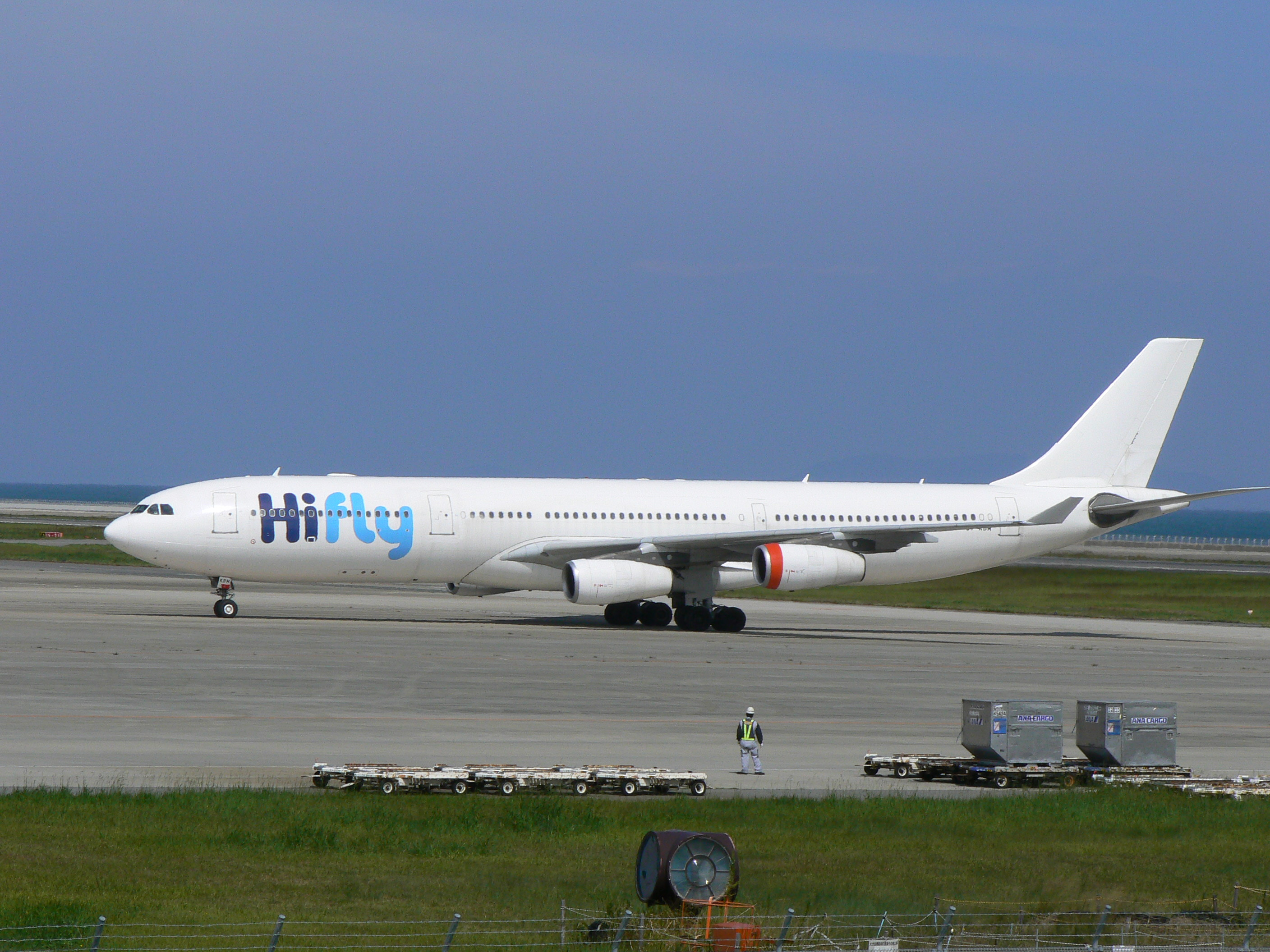
IATA	ICAO	Call sign
5K	HFY	SKY FLYER
- Founded: 2005; 21 years ago
- Operating bases: Beja Airport
- Subsidiaries: Hi Fly Malta
- Fleet size: 1
- Headquarters: Lisbon, Portugal
- Key people: Paulo Mirpuri (Chairman); Antonios Efthymiou (CEO)
- Website: hifly.aero

Hi Fly (legally Springjet, S.A.) is a Portuguese wet lease charter airline headquartered in Lisbon. Hi Fly operates globally as a leading specialist in providing aircraft with crew, maintenance, insurance, and charter services.

== History ==
=== Foundation and early years ===
The airline was incorporated in October 2005 and concluded its initial certification process in April 2006, when it was issued with an Air Operator Certificate by the Portugal civil aviation authority, ANAC. Since obtaining its Air Operator Certificate, the carrier has gained all the statutory EU-OPS (regulations specifying minimum safety and related procedures for commercial passenger and cargo fixed-wing aviation) and European Union Safety Agency (EASA) approvals. It also obtained the International Air Transport Association Operational Safety Audit (IOSA) certification in September 2011.

=== Fleet history ===
Hi Fly's first aircraft was an Airbus A330-300 that had previously been operated by Air Luxor, which was owned by the same family that now owns Hi Fly before it was sold and shut down. The aircraft was on contract to the Air Component of the Belgian Armed Forces until the end of 2013. Two A310-300s were then added in 2008 and these were leased to Oman Air flying the carrier's first long-haul routes (to London Heathrow and Bangkok).

New aircraft were then delivered from Airbus in 2008 and 2009; an A330-200 and two A340-500s, the latter used for approximately 5 years on behalf of Arik Air in Nigeria on its route between Lagos and New York John F. Kennedy, painted in its colors, until Hi Fly repossessed the airframes in spring 2015. Since then, more A330s and A340s have also been obtained, including four in 2013. In February 2014, Hi Fly added its first narrow-body aircraft, an A321-200 that has been leased to the Belgian Army in replacement of the former A330-300.

The airline took delivery of an Airbus A380 in mid-2018. The aircraft that Hi Fly operated is one of the first A380s delivered to Singapore Airlines, which will replace it with a newer, more efficient model. The double-decker aircraft was powered by Rolls-Royce Trent 900 engines and had a capacity of 471 passengers spread over three classes. The lower deck was entirely dedicated to economy class, carrying a total of 399 passengers, while the upper deck had business and first class seats, holding 60 and 12 passengers.

At the start of March 2013, Hi Fly Malta was created as Hi Fly's Maltese subsidiary operating a fleet of Airbus A340-600s; that division now operates a pair of A340-300s.

== Controversies ==
In May 2015, Saudi Arabian airline Saudia immediately terminated a long-term leasing contract with Hi Fly over two Airbus A330s, after one of them was seen at Ben Gurion Airport in Israel wearing the full Saudia livery. According to Israeli media reports, the A330 was undergoing routine maintenance with Israel Aerospace Industries' MRO wing Bedek as per its contract with Hi Fly. However, Arab News reported that even though the aircraft was not operating a commercial service for Saudia at the time, the Saudis claimed that Hi Fly had violated the terms of its contract by sending the jet to a country with which Saudi Arabia has no official diplomatic ties. Hi Fly subsequently returned the aircraft to its lessor along with its remaining A330-300.

=== Accidents and incidents ===
On 29 June 2019, a Hi Fly A340 returning to Orlando Airport dumped its fuel on over 84% of the airport's runway. The plane had been suffering hydraulic issues and was forced to return. It was not clear why the pilot dumped the fuel on the runway.

== Business strategy ==
Hi Fly tested serving passengers with compostable materials in the food and drink service rather than single-use plastic. A flight in December 2018 was the first ever without single-use cups, cutlery and containers. A total of 16 experimental flights were carried out and the total weight of plastic saved over the entire test was 1500 kg. On these flights, plastic cutlery was replaced with bamboo and cups, spoons, salt and pepper shakers, linen packaging, plates, individual butter jars, soft drink bottles and toothbrushes were replaced with compostable alternatives made from recycled material.

Hi-Fly's core business is Business-to-Business, meaning it leases its aircraft to other companies when they need additional capacity, emergency coverage, or to test new routes. Clients have included British Airways, Turkish Airlines, and various governments for official transport or repatriation flights.

== Notable achievements ==
On 2 November 2021, Hi Fly Flight 801 landed the first Airbus A340 on Antarctic blue glacial ice after a flight from Cape Town, South Africa to Wolf's Fang Runway, Antarctica. Captain Carlos Mirpuri and his crew flew the widebody aircraft; the journey was 2,500 nautical miles, flying for just over five hours each way. This operation was repeated in 2022 and 2023. Also in 2021, Hi Fly was one of the airlines used to deport asylum seekers from the United Kingdom. In May 2025 Hi Fly was tasked to operate an A380 flight between Glasgow Airport and John F. Kennedy International Airport, on behalf of British startup airline, Global Airlines.

== Corporate affairs ==
Hi Fly's head office is located in Lisbon's city centre. Inside are all the corporate offices plus departments for flight and ground operations, engineering and maintenance, safety, security, commercial, finance and administration, as well as quality control. There are also training classrooms for flight and cabin crews. At Lisbon Airport there is a maintenance hangar operated by MESA, a group subsidiary.

== Destinations ==
Hi Fly has no scheduled destinations. It specializes in worldwide aircraft leases and ACMI services on medium to long-term contracts for airlines, tour operators, governments, companies, sports teams and individuals.

== Fleet ==
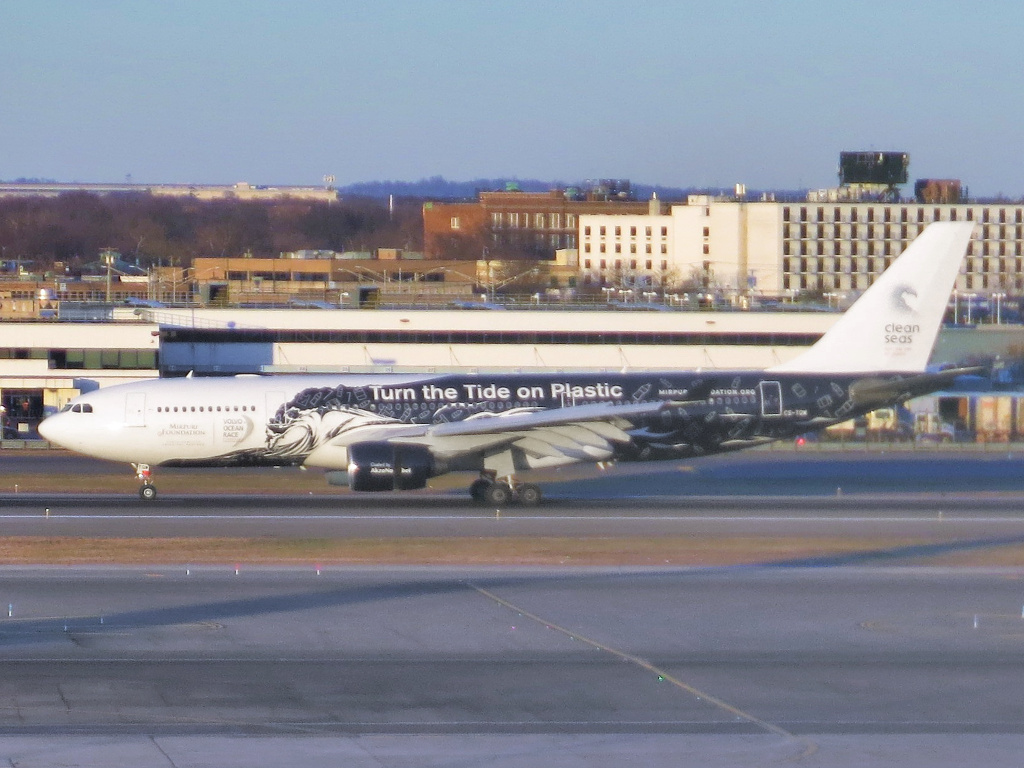
Hi Fly Airbus A330-200 in Volvo Ocean Race/Turn the Tide on Plastic special livery

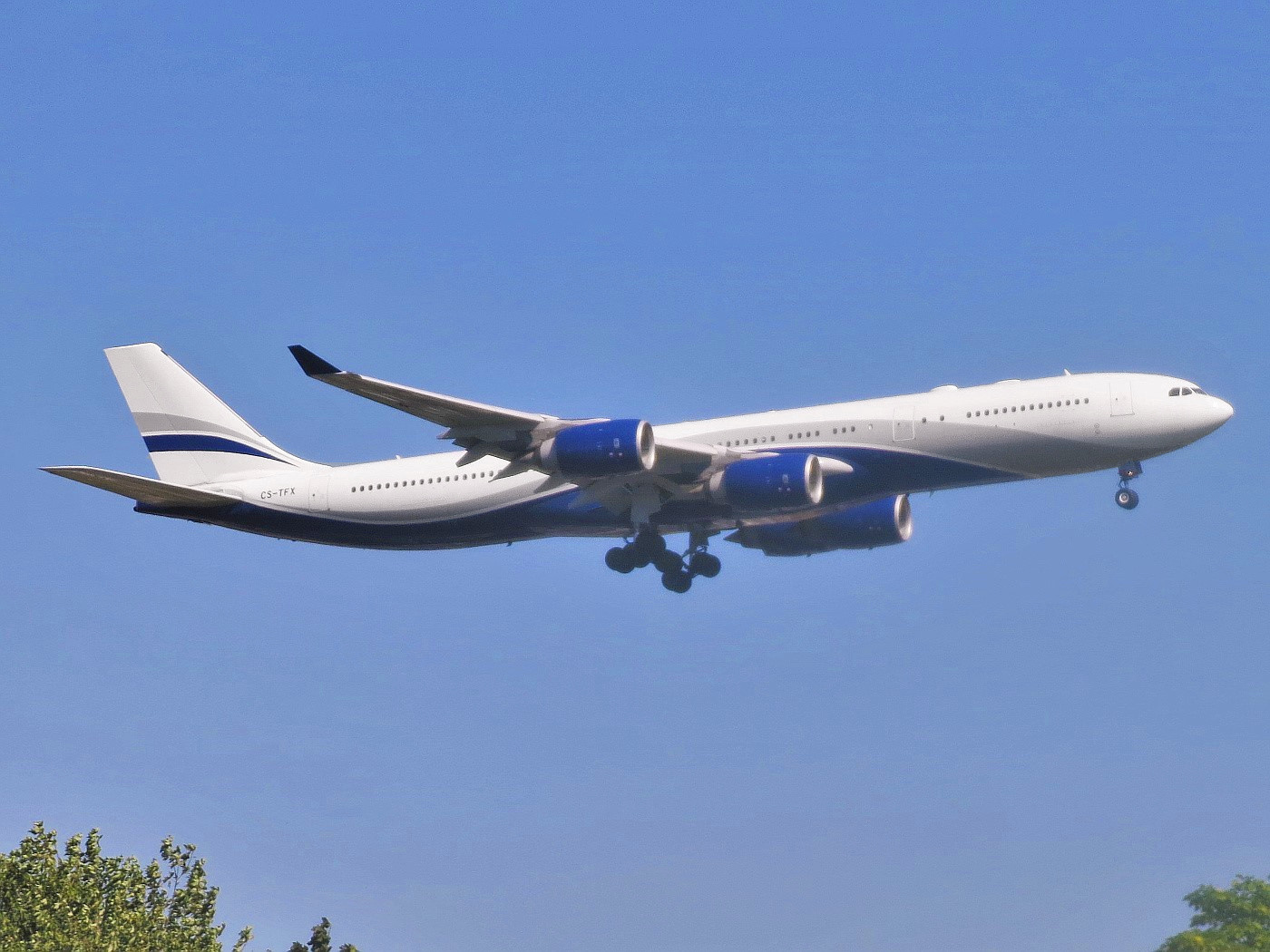
Hi Fly Airbus A340-500

=== Current ===
As of August 2025, Hi Fly operates the following aircraft:

Hi Fly fleet
Aircraft	In service	Orders	Passengers					Notes
Aircraft	In service	Orders	F	C	W	Y	Total	Notes
Airbus A330-200	1	—	—	18	36	214	268	
Total	1	—						

=== Former ===
Hi Fly has operated the following types of aircraft in the past:

Hi Fly former fleet
Aircraft	Total	Introduced	Retired	Notes
Airbus A310-300	2	2009	2015	
Airbus A319-100	1	2019	2019	
Airbus A320-200	3	2005	2006	
Airbus A330-200	2	2009	2019	
Airbus A330-300	2	2005	2017	
Airbus A330-900	1	2019	2022	Transferred to Sunclass Airlines
Airbus A340-300	3	2009	2018	One leased from Scandinavian Airlines
Airbus A340-500	2	2008	2018	

== See also ==
- List of airlines of Portugal
