= Tom Avery =

British explorer, author and motivational speaker

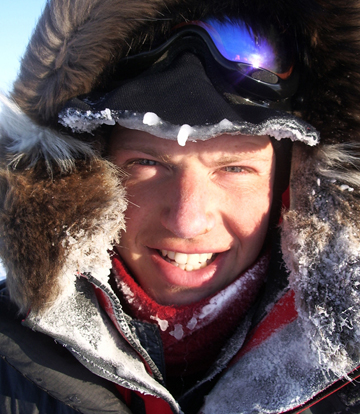
- Tom Avery
- Born: 17 December 1975 (age 50); London, England
- Occupation: Explorer-author-motivational speaker
- Employer: Verbier Exclusive Limited
- Known for: The youngest Briton to ski to the South Pole (2002) and the North Pole (2005). Holds world records for fastest surface journey to the North Pole the fastest crossing of Greenland (2015). One of fewer than 10 people to have completed the Polar Trilogy.
- Website: https://www.tomavery.net/?page_id=299

Tom Avery, FRGS (born 17 December 1975) is a British explorer, author and motivational speaker. He made record-breaking journeys to the South Pole in 2002 and to the North Pole in 2005. He is one of fewer than ten people throughout history to have completed the Polar Trilogy; full length expeditions to the South Pole and North Pole and a coast to coast crossing of Greenland. Avery and his teammates hold two Guinness World Records; the fastest surface journey to the North Pole and the fastest coast-to-coast crossing of Greenland. He is also the youngest Briton to have reached both the North and South Poles on foot.

== Early life ==
Tom Avery was born to Julian and Quenelda Avery in London, England and educated at Vinehall School in East Sussex. and Harrow School in North London. Due to his father's occupation, he frequently travelled with his family between Sussex, Brazil and France. When Tom was seven years old, his mother gave him a book about the adventures of Captain Robert Falcon Scott. As he later wrote in his book, To The End of the Earth (2009), he was captivated by Scott's heroic story and knew he wanted to go to Antarctica, and ultimately the South Pole.

== First expeditions and early career ==
Tom Avery's outdoor career began when he was 16 with a series of rock and ice climbs in Wales and Scotland. After leaving school, he spent a month trekking in the Zanskar Mountains of the Indian Himalaya.

At university, he organised and led mountaineering expeditions to the Andes, New Zealand, the Alps, Tanzania, Patagonia and Morocco. After graduating in 1998 with a BSc in Geography and Geology from the University of Bristol, he began a temporary 15-month career as an accountant with Arthur Andersen.

In 2000 he led a British mountaineering expedition to the remote Trans-Alay Mountains in Kyrgyzstan. They scaled a total of nine previously unclimbed and unnamed summits including the 5,439m Pik Quenelda (named after Avery's mother) and the 5,440m Golova Orla (Eagle's Head in English). They named one of their summits Pik Fiennes (5,001m), after the expedition patron, Sir Ranulph Fiennes.

Avery and his team aborted an attempt to make the first ascent of Kurumdy (6,614m) approximately 500m below the summit due to unstable snow conditions. At the time, Kurumdy was one of the Highest unclimbed mountains on Earth. A Russian team made the first ascent the following year.

He has climbed Mount Kilimanjaro in Tanzania, Pichincha and Cotopaxi in Ecuador, Condoriri, Pequeno Alpamayo and Illimani in Bolivia, Volcan Villarrica in Chile, Taranaki, Ngauruhoe and Ruapehu in New Zealand, Mount Kosciuszko in Australia, Mont Blanc du Tacul and Mont Dolent in the Alps, and Jebel Toubkal and Ouanoukrim in Morocco's Atlas Mountains. He has said that he has no interest in climbing Mount Everest due to commercialism and overcrowding on the mountain.

He made attempts on Artesonraju in Peru in 1997 (the mountain in the Paramount Pictures logo), Aconcagua in Argentina in 1998 and Cho Oyu in September 2006, when alongside teammate Kenton Cool he was aiming to be the first Briton to ski down an 8,000-metre peak. Avery was forced to turn back at 6,500m after suffering a retinal hemorrhage, while Cool went on to summit and ski back down.

In 2000 Avery completed the Haute Route alpine traverse on skis, and in 2002, while training for the South Pole, he and his teammates made the first ski descent of the western (Melchior) breach of the Franz Josef Glacier in New Zealand's Southern Alps.

In 2006, he led the first British team to complete the Patrouille des Glaciers, the largest ski mountaineering race in the World, involving 4,000 metres of both ascent and descent over 53 km of glaciated terrain between Zermatt and Verbier.

== South Pole expedition ==
In 2002, Avery at age 27 became the youngest Briton ever to ski to the South Pole. The Commonwealth South Pole Centenary Expedition was the ninth major expedition that he had organised and was the culmination of two years' planning.

Following a training expedition to New Zealand's Southern Alps, Avery, Paul Landry, Andrew Gerber and Patrick Woodhead flew to Antarctica in early November 2002, beginning their 700-mile (1,135 km) expedition from Hercules Inlet.

On 28 December 2002, 45 days and 6 hours later, Avery's team completed the journey to the South Pole. They broke the British South Pole speed record by using kites to power them across the ice, much like the modern sport of kitesurfing. They covered the last 47 miles (76 km) to the Pole in a marathon final 31 hours of continuous manhauling.

In recognition of the Expedition's accomplishments, Avery was presented with the Royal Institute of Navigation's Certificate of Achievement by The Duke of Edinburgh at a ceremony at the Royal Geographical Society.

Based largely on his Antarctic journal, Avery published Pole Dance as his first book. Written in diary form, it details the 2002 South Pole expedition. The book's title is a nod to a chance meeting with the nightclub owner Peter Stringfellow on an aeroplane, who promised to introduce Avery to his publisher on the condition that Avery launch the book at his table-dancing club in Covent Garden.

== North Pole expedition ==
In 2005 Avery, along with teammates Matty McNair, Andrew Gerber, George Wells and Hugh Dale-Harris recreated Robert Peary and Matthew Henson's 1909 controversial expedition to the North Pole. His goal of the expedition was to assess whether Peary had achieved what he claimed.

Avery's party reached the Pole in a faster time that any expedition had managed since 1909. They used the same equipment available to Peary and Henson for their 1909 expedition, and their sled weights were broadly the same.

Travelling with Canadian Eskimo Dog teams and replicas of Peary's own wooden sledges, Avery's team set out from Peary's original Base Camp at Cape Columbia on Ellesmere Island. Shortly before their departure from Cape Columbia, Avery and his team discovered original relics and tools from the 1909 mission.

They covered the 413 nautical miles (765 km) to the Geographic North Pole in 36 days, 22 hours and 11 minutes, some four hours faster than Peary and Henson had recorded.

The team endured temperatures in the minus forties, lost several miles a day to the drifting ice pack, and they were burning 10,000 calories on the coldest days.

The Avery team's speediest distance over 5 marches was 90 nautical miles, significantly short of the 135 claimed by Peary in his 5-march dash to the Pole in 1909. However, Peary was travelling for up to 20 hours a day, his significantly larger team enabled him to save the fittest dogs for the final polar dash and the ice pack of 1909 was dominated by thicker and more stable multi-year ice, which provided a generally smoother and therefore quicker surface to travel across.

After undertaking what he calls "the toughest expedition of his life," Avery said he is "more convinced now than ever that Peary, Henson and their Inuit guides were the first men to reach the North Pole. Not only the fact that we beat their time, but we got a real insight into how they navigated and how they traveled, and with the equipment that they had, I had no doubt at all that they reached the pole."

Former president of the National Geographic Society Gilbert Grosvenor said "Peary's critics always claimed it was impossible to dash to the pole in the time that Peary did it. Well, Tom Avery proved that you could do that. He beat his time, and that takes away a little bit of the argument that Peary didn't make it."

Commenting on Avery's achievement, the expedition patron, HRH Prince Charles said; "This country's tradition of producing refreshingly eccentric adventurers is very much alive."

Avery recounted his experience in his 2009 book, To The End of the Earth: The Race to Solve Polar Exploration's Greatest Mystery, which was published on both sides of the Atlantic.

Based on this expedition, Avery argues in his book that Peary did reach the North Pole in 1909. Sir Wally Herbert, a polar explorer, was earlier commissioned by the National Geographic Society to assess Peary's records, and gave him access to his original diary and astronomical observations. Based on Herbert's published conclusions in 1989, it is widely held that Peary did not reach the Pole, although he was likely within five miles.

However, in his book, Avery argued that Herbert could not be deemed an impartial adjudicator, because by renouncing Peary's claim, that would then crown Herbert himself (who drove dog teams to the Pole in 1969) as the first person to reach the North Pole on foot.

To mark the centenary of Peary's expedition, Avery organised a ceremony at Peary and Henson's grave sites at Arlington National Cemetery at 11am in April 2009, exactly 100 years after they claimed to have reached the North Pole. More than 20 members of Peary's and Henson's extended families, Avery's North Pole team and other dignitaries attended the ceremony, which also included a Colour Guard and Military Band.

== Greenland expedition ==
In 2015, Avery announced that he was setting out to complete the final leg of the Polar Trilogy by making a coast-to-coast crossing of Greenland, and to do so in a record time. Whilst there had been faster crossings of Greenland's interior ice sheet, the fastest time for a full coast-to-coast traverse of Greenland stood at 17 days and 20 hours, set in 2008.

With each of the team just months away from their fortieth birthdays, Avery called the expedition their "midlife crisis". After snowkiting training on the frozen lakes of Norway's Hardangervidda Plateau, Avery, along with fellow Britons Andrew Gerber, George Wells and Patrick Woodhead set off from the small fishing village of Isertoq on Greenland's east coast. For the first two days of the expedition, the team manhauled their pulks to the more favourable kiting grounds of the ice sheet over 2,000 metres above sea level.

They made steady progress for the first half of the crossing, before strong winds enabled them to kite 180 miles (290 km) to the western edge of the ice cap in a single 16-hour push. During one 10-minute period, their GPS data recorded an average kiting speed over the ground of 23.4 knots (43.3kmh). Temperatures were unseasonably cold for the time of year, and Wells suffered frostbitten toes, seven of which had to be amputated on their return to the UK. The team (including Wells) descended the Russell Glacier and continued on to the ocean at the head of Kangerlussuaq Fjord, completing the crossing on 17 May 2005, in new record time of 9 days, 19 hours and 40 minutes, 8 days quicker than the previous crossing.

== Professional groups ==
Avery is a fellow of the Royal Geographical Society in London and a member of the Explorers Club in New York. Avery is a regular on the international motivational and corporate speaking circuit, lecturing in a variety of venues from the Davos World Economic Forum to an uninhabited sandbar in the Maldives. Avery has also spoken about his expeditions at the Royal Geographical Society and Alpine Club in London, as well as the Explorers Club in New York and the National Geographic Society in Washington DC.

Avery is one of 14 founder members (others include Sir Robin Knox-Johnson, Sir David Hempleman-Adams, Bear Grylls and Ben Fogle) of the G.H.Mumm Cordon Rouge Club of adventurers and ocean sailors.

== Personal life ==
Along with Welsh rugby player Jonathan Davies, Avery was part of the winning team in the 2004 TAG Heuer Link Challenge celebrity golf event at Sunningdale Golf Club and in 2008 he played in the Alfred Dunhill Links pro-am Championships in St Andrews.

In 2005, Avery partnered record-breaking ocean sailor Dame Ellen Macarthur in the Round the Island Yacht Race aboard the 75-foot trimaran B&Q round the Isle of Wight, finishing sixth out of 1,300 boats. They raced together again in the 2008 Cowes Week yachting regatta aboard an Extreme 40 catamaran.

Avery lives in the Cotswolds.

== Charitable work ==
Avery's expeditions have raised over £100,000 for The Prince's Trust, for who he was an official ambassador for many years. Avery is a patron of the Duke of Edinburgh's Award who he supports by presenting participants with their Gold Awards at ceremonies held at the Royal Palaces. Avery was an official ambassador for the London 2012 Olympic Games, and took an Olympic torch to the North Pole on his 2005 expedition.

Alongside fellow explorer Sir Ranulph Fiennes and rugby union player and coach Dean Richards, Avery led 200 members of the public on the 2006 Talisker Trek on the Isle of Skye. Avery led the 2007 Talisker Trek with endurance swimmer Lewis Pugh and rugby union player and broadcaster Martin Bayfield. The treks raised enough funds for The Woodland Trust to plant more than 500,000 trees.

== Other work ==
In 2008 Avery designed a mountain journal in conjunction with the luxury stationers Smythson of Bond Street. In 2009 Avery founded the luxury ski holiday company Verbier Exclusive, which is headquartered in the Cotswolds and Verbier in the Swiss Alps. In 2023, the premium vacation rental operator Emerald Stay acquired a majority stake in Verbier Exclusive.

== Bibliography ==
- Pole Dance (Orion, 2004)
- To The End of the Earth (St Martin's Press, 2009)
