= Wolf's Fang Runway =

Runway in Queen Maud Land, Antarctica

- IATA: none; ICAO: none; LID: AT98

Summary
- Airport type: Private
- Operator: White Desert Ltd.
- Location: Queen Maud Land, Antarctica
- Elevation AMSL: 3,707 ft (1,130 m)
- Coordinates: 71°31′S 08°48′E
- Website: white-desert.com/about-us/wolfsfang-runway-logistics/

Map
- Location of airfield in Antarctica

Runways
Direction	Length		Surface
Direction	ft	m	Surface
17T/35T	9,842	3,000	Ice

Wolf's Fang Runway is a runway in Queen Maud Land, Antarctica. Flights operate to and from the runway during summer in the Southern Hemisphere. It is operated by White Desert, a British tour operator offering a commercial private jet service to Antarctica.

The runway is situated approximately 130 km southwest of the Schirmacher Oasis.

It is the first runway built in Antarctica that supports large passenger jets to take off and land on, including the Airbus A330 and A340 variants.

== Airlines and destinations ==
Airlines	Destinations
Hi Fly Malta	Seasonal Charter: Cape Town

== See also ==
- Blue ice runway
- List of airports in Antarctica
