= Hi Fly Malta =

Maltese charter airline

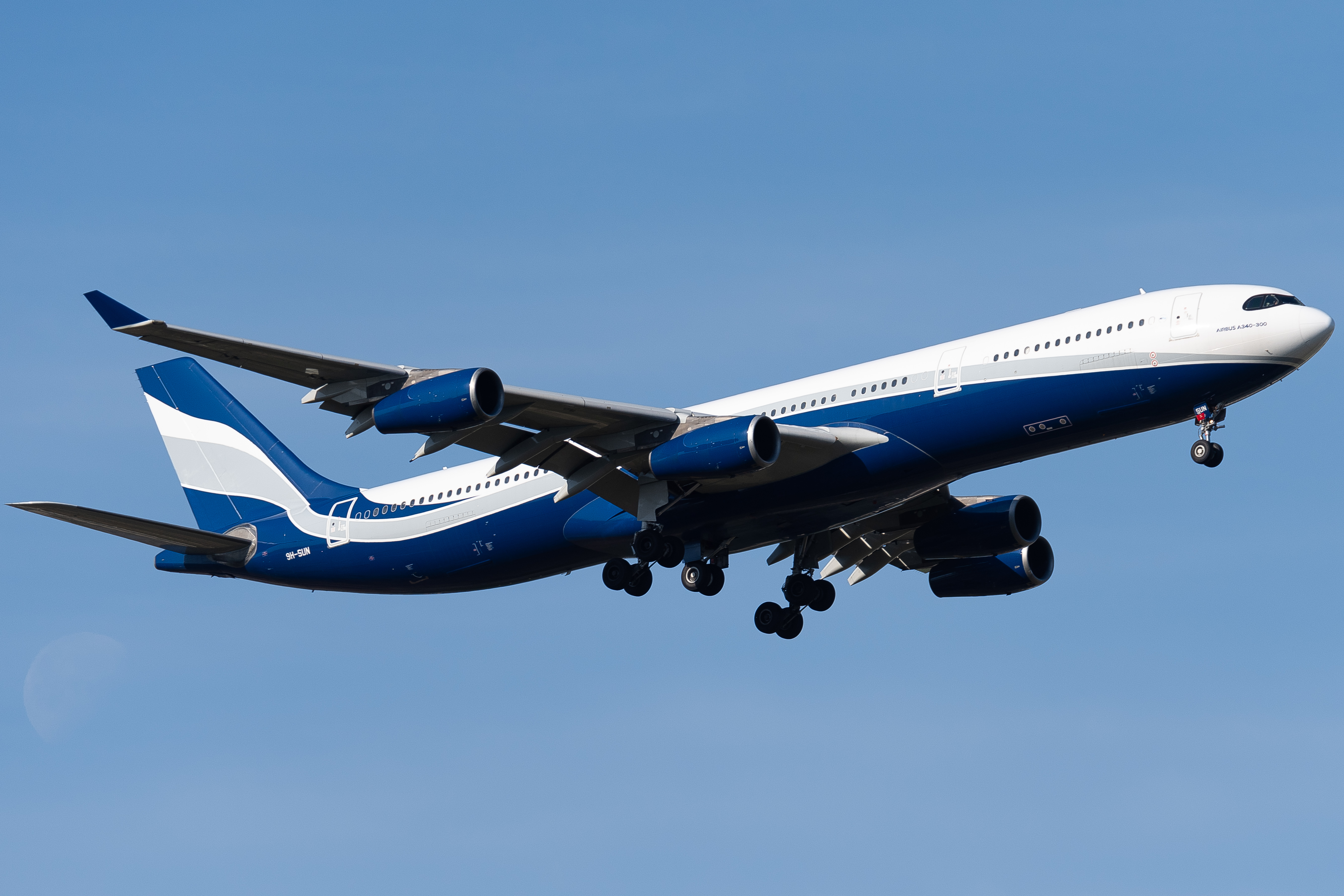
- Airbus A340-300 in standard livery
IATA	ICAO	Call sign
3L	HFM	MOONRAKER
- Founded: 2013; 13 years ago
- AOC #: MT-24
- Operating bases: Malta International Airport
- Fleet size: 8
- Parent company: Hi Fly
- Headquarters: Skyparks Business Centre, Malta International Airport
- Website: hifly.aero

Hi Fly Malta is a Maltese charter airline based at Malta International Airport and a subsidiary of the Portuguese charter airline Hi Fly.

== History ==
Hi Fly Malta started operations in early 2013 with one Airbus A340-600 formerly operated by Virgin Atlantic with one more pre-owned on order and planned to start scheduled operations to destinations in North America. During 2015, all of the airlines' aircraft had been stored and in May 2015 the A340-600s were sold to Al Naser Airlines, a front company for Mahan Air.

Hi Fly Malta was reactivated in September with the re-registration of one A340-300 from the parent Portuguese company on the Maltese Business Registry and a second A340-300 was added in early 2016 that had previously flown for SriLankan Airlines. Several former Emirates A340-300 airframes were added in 2017.

In the summer of 2018, Hi Fly became the first airline to buy a secondhand Airbus A380 (flown previously by Singapore Airlines), placing an order for two. In autumn 2017, Hi Fly, in a sponsorship of the Turn the Tide on Plastic yacht team in the Volvo Ocean Race, painted one of its A330s in a livery similar to the yacht, with the port side bearing a dirty oceans livery and the starboard side a clean oceans livery. On 19 July 2018, its newly painted Airbus A380, registered as 9H-MIP, arrived at the Farnborough Airshow, carrying the Save the Coral Reefs livery. Hi-Fly's A380 saw a brief lease to Norwegian Long Haul in August 2018, which operated the aircraft following engine problems with its Boeing 787 Dreamliner fleet. Norwegian leased the A380 again in late 2018 to help deal with the passenger backlog as a result of the Gatwick Airport drone incident. In November 2020, the company announced that the A380 will be retired at the end of its three-year lease period and on 17 December 2020, the A380 made its final flight to Toulouse.

One A319 was chartered to the now-defunct Brazilian Itapemirim Transportes Aéreos. In November 2021, it landed at Rio de Janeiro–Galeão International Airport and re-registered as PS-SIL to be converted to passenger configuration at TAP Hangar, but this never happened. After 3 months in Brazil the aircraft was scheduled to fly back to Europe and had its registration reverted back to 9H-XFW.

== Destinations ==
Hi Fly Malta has no scheduled destinations. Its planes operate on a charter and ACMI basis. One of its Airbus A340-300s (registered 9H-TQM) was reconfigured for Swiss Space Systems prior to its liquidation, and retained a black livery with the Swiss Space Systems logo on the horizontal stabilizer prior to its retirement, while its other airframes are unmarked except for registration.

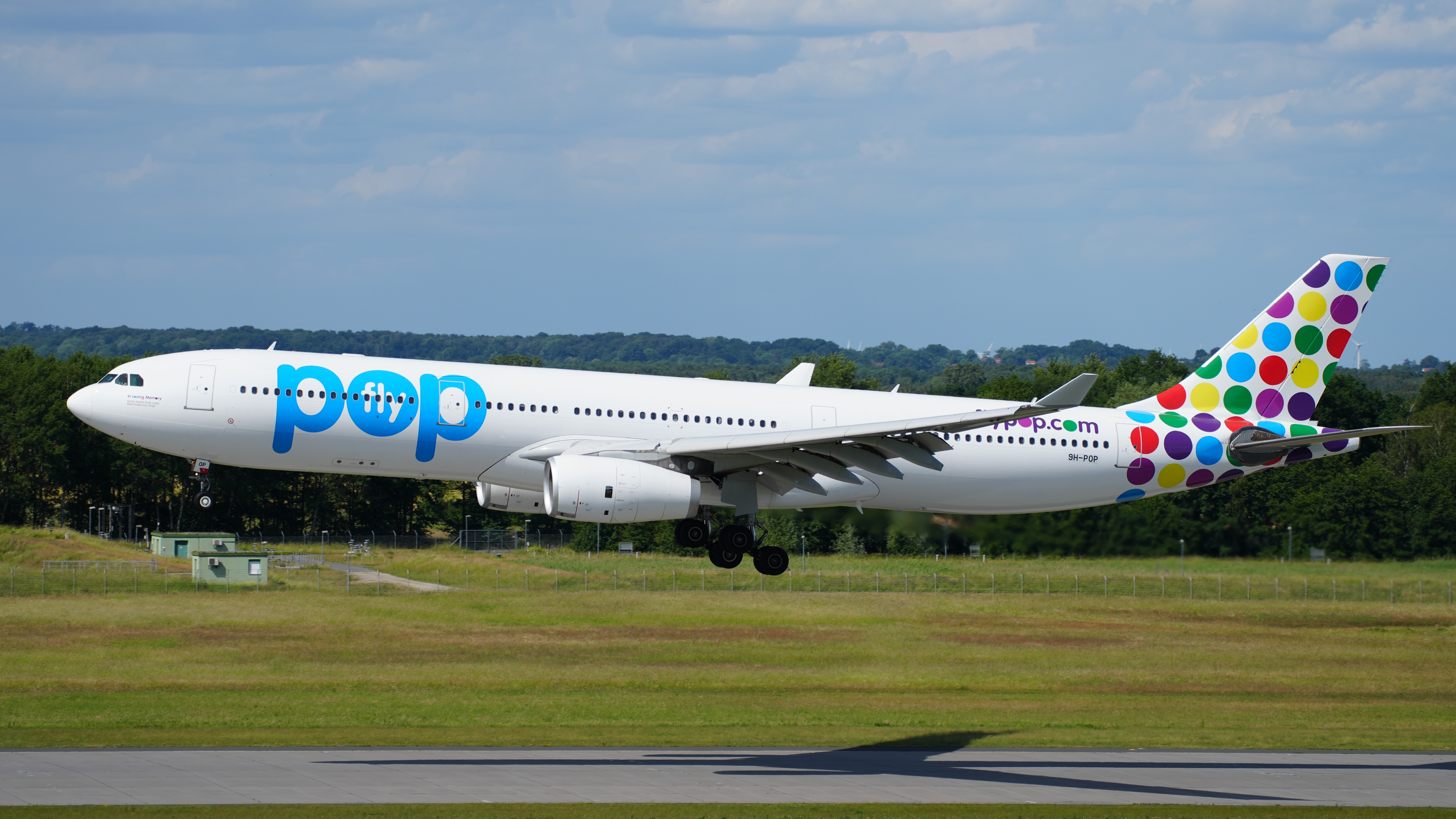
Airbus A330 in Flypop livery

== Fleet ==
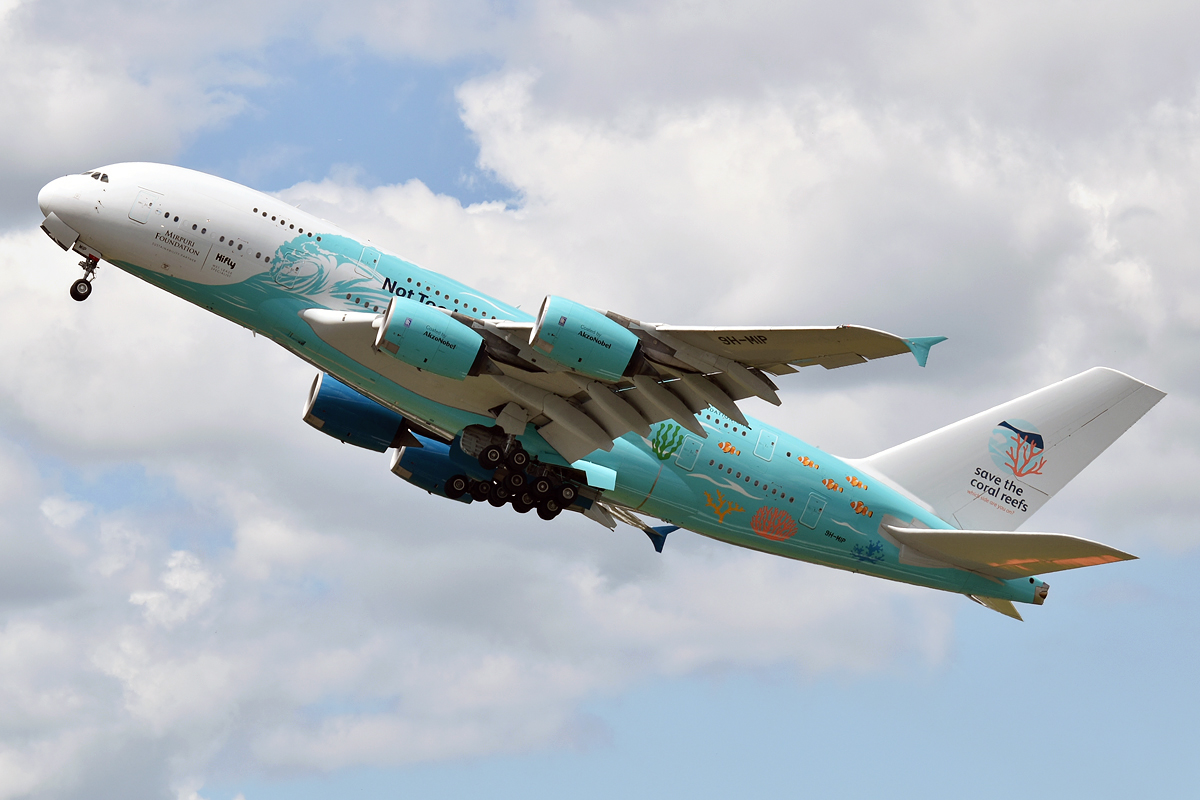
Hi Fly Malta's former only Airbus A380-800 with the "Save the Coral Reef" livery

=== Current fleet ===
As of July 2026, Hi Fly Malta operates the following aircraft:

Hi Fly Malta fleet
Aircraft	In service	Orders	Passengers					Notes
Aircraft	In service	Orders	F	C	W	Y	Total	Notes
Airbus A330-200	5	—	–	18	36	214	268	Two units parked/under maintenance.
Airbus A330-200	5	—	–	14	31	267	314	Two units parked/under maintenance.
Airbus A330-300	2	—	–	46	–	203	249	
Airbus A330-300	2	—	–	–	–	436	436	
Airbus A380	1	—	8	70	–	428	506	Operated for Global Airlines. Currently parked.
Total	8	—						

=== Former fleet ===
As of August 2025, Hi Fly Malta operated 6 Airbus A330-200, 2 Airbus A330-300, 4 Airbus A340-300 and 1 Airbus A380.

Hi Fly Malta formerly also operated the following aircraft types:

Hi Fly Malta former fleet
Aircraft	Introduced	Retired	Notes
Airbus A319-100	2019	2024	
Airbus A321-200	2019	2021	
Airbus A330-900	2019	2022	
Airbus A340-600	2013	2015	

== See also ==
- List of airlines of Malta
