= HME =

HME may refer to:

- HM Electronics, an American communications technology company
- HME, Incorporated, a U.S. custom truck manufacturer
- Hereditary multiple exostoses
- Human monocytotropic ehrlichiosis, an infectious disease
- Home medical equipment
- Hamble railway station, in England
- Heat and moisture exchanger
- Human macrophage metalloelastase, an enzyme
- Hot melt extrusion
- Hermes Aviation, a defunct airline of Malta
- Home market effect
- Huishui Miao, a language of China
- Homemade explosive, often used in improvised explosive devices
- Oued Irara–Krim Belkacem Airport, in Algeria
- Humen railway station, China Railway pinyin code HME
- Hazardous Materials Endorsement, a HAZMAT endorsement issued by the U.S. Transportation Security Administration
- nl:Havermelkelite, a Dutch neologism referring to an elite that exhibits responsible or sustainable behaviour
