= List of Airbus A330 operators =

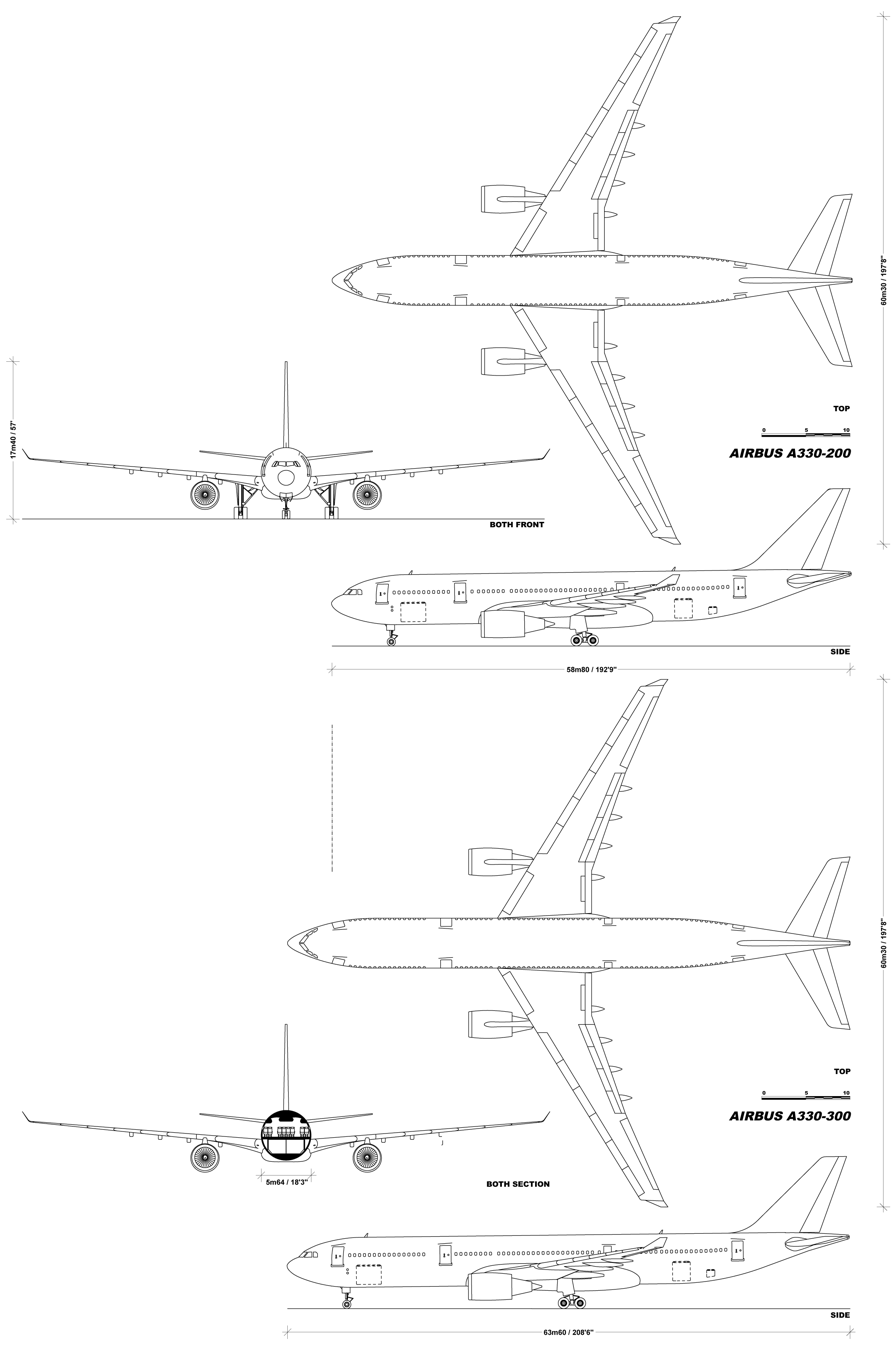
Line drawings of the A330-200 and A330-300, the two most common types in service of Airbus A330 range.

The Airbus A330 is a wide-body, dual-isle, twin-engine jet airliner made by Airbus. Versions of the A330 have a range of 7,400 to 13,430 kilometres (4,000 to 7,250 nautical miles), and can accommodate up to 335 passengers in a two-class layout, or carry 70 tonnes (150,000 pounds) of cargo. Two A330-300s were modified to accommodate up to 436 passengers.

The origin of the A330 dates to the 1970s as one of several conceived derivatives of Airbus's first airliner, the A300. The A330 was developed in parallel with the A340, which shared many common airframe components, but differed in number of engines. Both airliners incorporated fly-by-wire flight control technology, first introduced on an Airbus aircraft with the A320, as well as the A320's six-display glass cockpit. In June 1987, after receiving orders from various customers, Airbus launched the A330 and A340. The A330 was Airbus's first airliner offered with the choice of three engines: General Electric, Pratt & Whitney, and Rolls-Royce.

The A330-300, the first variant, took its maiden flight in November 1992, and entered passenger service with Air Inter in January 1994. Responding to dwindling sales, Airbus followed up with the slightly shorter A330-200 variant in 1998, which has proved more popular. Subsequently, developed A330 variants include a dedicated freighter, the A330-200F, and a military multi-role aerial refuelling tanker-transport, the A330 MRTT.

Since its launch, the A330 has allowed Airbus to expand market share in wide-body airliners. Airlines have selected the A330 as a replacement for less economical trijets, and versus rival twinjets. Boeing has offered variants of the 767 as direct competitors, along with the 787 which entered service in 2011. Airbus's A350 also shares this wide-body airliner market. As of March 2026, the A330's order book contained 1,970 airframes, of which 1,663 had been delivered and 1,457 were in service. The largest operator is Delta Air Lines with 81 aircraft.

== Airline operators ==
A list of operators of the Airbus A330, as of April 2026.

legend	notes
*	current
*	former
	orders

Airline	Country	Photo	200	200F	300	300P2F	800	900	Total in service	Notes
undisclosed customers			24	3	22				49	
government; executive & private			54						54	
Aer Lingus	Ireland		3		10			21	13	
Aer Lingus UK	United Kingdom				2				—	Ceased operations in 2026.
Aeroflot	Russia		5		12				12	No longer supported by Airbus due to the Russian invasion of Ukraine.
Aerolíneas Argentinas	Argentina		10						10	
Aerolíneas Estelar	Venezuela				1				1	Leased from Iberojet.
AeroSur	Bolivia		1						—	Operated by Air Comet.
Afriqiyah Airways	Libya		2		1				3	
Aigle Azur	France		2						—	Ceased operations in 2019.
Air Anka	Turkey		1		1				2	
Air Algérie	Algeria		8		3			4	12	
Air Belgium	Belgium		2	3				2	7	1 A330-200F operating for CMA CGM Air Cargo.
Air Berlin	Germany		17		3				—	Ceased operations in 2017.
Air Canada	Canada				20				20	
Air Caraïbes	Guadeloupe		1		2				3	
Air Caraïbes Atlantique	France		1		1				1	
Air China	China		15		28				43	
Air Comet	Spain		8						—	Ceased operations in 2009.
Air Côte d'Ivoire	Ivory Coast							2	2	
Air Europa	Spain		12		5				—	
Air France	France		11						11	
Air Greenland	Greenland		1				1		1	
Air Hong Kong	Hong Kong			2		4			6	
Air India	India		2						—	
Air Inter	France				4				—	Launch customer of A330-300, merged with Air France in 1997.
Air Italy	Italy		5						—	Ceased operations in 2020, transferred to Qatar Airways.
Air Leisure	Egypt		3						—	Ceased operations in 2018.
Air Madrid	Spain		3		2				—	Ceased operations in 2006.
Air Mauritius	Mauritius		2					2	4	
Air Namibia	Namibia		2						—	Ceased operations in 2021.
Air Nigeria	Nigeria		1						—	Ceased operations in 2012, leased from EgyptAir.
Air One	Italy		2						—	Ceased operations in 2014.
Air Samarkand	Uzbekistan				1				1	
Air Senegal	Senegal							2	2	One operated by Airhub Airlines.
Air Serbia	Serbia		4						4	
Air Transat	Canada		14		2				16	
AirAsia X	Malaysia		1		30			15	30	
AirCalin	New Caledonia		2					2	2	
Airhub Airlines	Malta		1		2			1	4	A330-900 operating for Air Senegal.
AirTanker	United Kingdom		14						14	Operates the Airbus Voyager for the Royal Air Force, leasing its 'surge' fleet to civilian airlines.
Ajwaa Airlines	Egypt		1						1	Leased from EgyptAir.
Alitalia	Italy		14						—	Ceased operations in 2021.
AlMasria Universal Airlines	Egypt		1						—	
Amazon Air	United States					7			7	Operated by Hawaiian Airlines.
American Airlines	United States		15		9				—	Acquired from merger with US Airways.
Arik Air	Nigeria		3						—	
Asiana Airlines	South Korea				15				15	
ASL Airlines Ireland	Ireland			2		3			3	Operated by DHL.
Aura Airlines	Spain		1						—	Ceased operations in 2022.
Avianca	Colombia		12		2				—	
Avianca Brasil	Brazil		6	1					—	Ceased operations in 2019.
Avianca Cargo	Colombia			6		4			6	
Avianca Perú	Peru		1						—	Ceased operations in 2020, transferred to Avianca.
Awesome Cargo	Mexico			1					1	
Azores Airlines	Portugal		1						—	
Azul Brazilian Airlines	Brazil		6					3	12	4 units of the A330-900 to be added to the fleet, and 2 leased aircraft from Avianca.
Batavia Air	Indonesia		2						—	Ceased operations in 2013
Batik Air	Indonesia				1				1	
Batik Air Malaysia	Malaysia				6			1	7	
Beijing Capital Airlines	China		7		4				11	
Belavia	Belarus		3						3	
BH Air	Bulgaria		1						—	
Blue Panorama Airlines	Italy		3						—	Ceased operations in 2022, operated under Luke Air name, never entered service.
Blue Wings	Germany		2						—	Transferred to TAP Air Portugal.
Boliviana de Aviación	Bolivia		2						2	
British Midland International	United Kingdom		3						—	Merged with British Airways in 2012.
Brussels Airlines	Belgium		4		10				10	
Canada 3000	Canada		4						—	Launch customer of A330-200, ceased operations in 2001.
Cathay Dragon	Hong Kong				29				—	Ceased and merged operations with Cathay Pacific in 2020 due to COVID-19. Older batches of A330-300 were retired.
Cathay Pacific	Hong Kong				42			41	42	Largest operator of the A330-300. Older batches of A330-300 to be retired. 41 A330-900 ordered
Cebu Pacific	Philippines				8			14	14	Replaced by A330-900 and RP-C3341 is now operated by SmartLynx Malta, RP-C3342 and RP C3344 is operated by US Bangla Airlines, RP-C3343 is operated by Air Transat, RP-C4435 is operated by Lion Air, and RP-C3346 (PK-LEY) on order. RP-C3347 and RP-C3348 was sold back to Airbus.
Centrum Air	Uzbekistan				3				3	
China Airlines	Taiwan				16				16	To be retired by 2026.
China Eastern Airlines	China		30		25				55	
China Southern Airlines	China		14		27				41	
Citilink	Indonesia				1			2	3	Transferred to Garuda Indonesia.
CMA CGM Air Cargo	Belgium			1					1	Operated by Air Belgium.
Compagnie Africaine d'Aviation	Congo		1						1	
Condor	Germany		2		2			18	18	A330-300 leased from Smartlynx Airlines Malta.
Conviasa	Venezuela		1		1				—	A330-200 leased from Hi Fly. A330-300 leased from AirAsia X.
Corsair International	France		3		7			9	10	
Cubana de Aviación	Cuba		1						—	Leased from Novair.
Cyprus Airways	Cyprus		2						—	.
Czech Airlines	Czech Republic	Czech Airlines Airbus A330-323			1				—	Leased from Korean Air.
Delta Air Lines	United States	Delta Air Lines Airbus A330-323X	11		31			39	81	Largest A330 operator.
DHL Air UK	United Kingdom					3			3	
Discover Airlines	Germany	Discover Airlines Airbus A330-343	3		9				12	
Dragonair	Hong Kong	Dragonair Airbus A330-343			30				—	Rebranded to Cathay Dragon in 2016.
Edelweiss Air	Switzerland	Edelweiss Air Airbus A330-343X	2		2				—	A330-300 transferred to Eurowings Discover.
EgyptAir	Egypt	EgyptAir Airbus A330-343	3		4				7	
EgyptAir Cargo	Egypt	EgyptAir Cargo Airbus A330-243(P2F)		3					3	
Emirates	United Arab Emirates	Emirates Airbus A330-243	29						—	
Etihad Airways	United Arab Emirates	Etihad Airways Airbus A330-243	31	5	6			15	—	
Eurofly	Italy	Eurofly Airbus A330-200	5						—	Merged with Meridiana in 2010.
European Air Transport Leipzig	Germany	European Air Transport Leipzig Airbus A330-243F		3		2			5	
Eurowings	Germany	Eurowings Airbus A330-203	7		5				12	A330-200 operated by SunExpress Deutschland. A330-300 operated by Brussels Airlines.
EVA Air	Taiwan	EVA Air Airbus A330-203	11		9				12	
Evelop Airlines	Spain	Evelop Airlines Airbus A330-343			1			4	—	Renamed to Iberojet in 2021.
Eznis Airways	Mongolia	Eznis Airways Airbus A330-202	1						1	
Fiji Airways	Fiji	Fiji Airways Airbus A330-243	3		1				4	
Finnair	Finland	Finnair Airbus A330-302			8				8	
flyadeal	Saudi Arabia		3		1			10	4	Leased from Aviator Capital via Air Anka. One Airbus A330-200 leased from Aircastle via GullivAir.
Flynas	Saudi Arabia	Flynas Airbus A330-300	2		2			15	10	A330-200 leased from Hi Fly and Eaglexpress Air. A330-900 leased from Lion Air.
Fly Gangwon	South Korea		1						1	
Fly OYA	Libya		1						1	
French Bee	France	French Bee Airbus A330-323			1				—	Formerly French Blue, transferred to Air Caraïbes.
Garuda Indonesia	Indonesia	Garuda Indonesia Airbus A330-341	5		17			5	27	
GetJet Airlines	Lithuania				1					
GOL	Brazil							3	3	
Gulf Air	Bahrain	Gulf Air Airbus A330-243	12						—	
GullivAir	Bulgaria	GullivAir Airbus A330-223	2						2	
Hans Airways	United Kingdom	Hans Airways Airbus A330-200	1						1	
Hainan Airlines	China	Hainan Airlines Airbus A330-343	4		22			1	27	
Hawaiian Airlines	United States	Hawaiian Airlines Airbus A330-243	24			10			34	A330-300(P2F)s operating for Amazon Air.
Heston Airlines	Lithuania	Heston Airlines Airbus A330-243	3						3	
Hi Fly	Portugal	Hi Fly Airbus A330-223	2		2			1	—	
HiSky Europe	Romania	Hisky Europe Airbus A330-243	1						1	
Hi Fly Malta	Malta	Hi Fly Malta Airbus A330-343 Hi Fly Malta Airbus A330-343	7		2			1	9	A330-900 transferred to Airhub Airlines.
Hong Kong Airlines	Hong Kong	Hong Kong Airlines Airbus A330-243F	9	5	7				21	
Iberia	Spain	Iberia Airbus A330-302	18		8				26	
Iberojet	Spain	Iberojet Airbus A330-941			2			2	4	
Iberworld Airlines	Spain	Iberworld Airlines Airbus A330-300	1		4				—	A330-200 leased from Orbest, rebranded to Orbest Orizonia Airlines in 2011.
I-Fly	Russia	I-Fly Airbus A330-322	3		3				6	No longer supported by Airbus due to the Russian invasion of Ukraine.
Indonesia AirAsia X	Indonesia	Indonesia AirAsia X Airbus A330-343			2				—	Ceased operations in 2019.
Iran Air	Iran	Iran Air Airbus A330-243	2						2	
Iraqi Airways	Iraq	Iraqi Airways Airbus A330-202	1						1	
ITA Airways	Italy	ITA Airways Airbus A330-941	3					16	19	
Jet2.com	United Kingdom	Jet2.com Airbus A330-243	2						—	Leased from AirTanker Services.
Jet Airways	India	Jet Airways Airbus A330-202	12		4				—	
Jordan Aviation	Jordan	Jordan Aviation Airbus A330-243	2						2	
KLM	Netherlands	KLM Royal Dutch Airlines Airbus A330-203	6		5				11	To be retired by 2025.
Korean Air	South Korea	Korean Air Airbus A330-223	8		22				30	
Kuwait Airways	Kuwait	Kuwait Airways Airbus A330-841	5				4	5	9	Launch customer of A330-800.
LEVEL	Spain	LEVEL Airbus A330-202	7					21	7	Operated by Iberia.
Libyan Airlines	Libya	Libyan Airlines A330-202	3						3	
Lion Air	Indonesia	Lion Air Airbus A330-343			4			8	12	
LTU International	Germany	LTU International A330-223	9		8				—	Merged with Air Berlin in 2009.
Lucky Air	China	Lucky Air Airbus A330-343			5				5	
Lufthansa	Germany	Lufthansa Airbus A330-343	5		11				11	To be replaced by 787-9.
Maldivian	Maldives	Maldivian Airbus A330-203	1						1	
Malaysia Airlines	Malaysia	Malaysia Airlines Airbus A330-323X	4	3	15			10	32	
Maleth-Aero	Malta	Maleth-Aero Airbus A330-203	4						4	
Mas Air	Mexico	Mas Air Airbus A330-343		2		1			3	
MASkargo	Malaysia	MASkargo Airbus A330-223F		3					3	
Meridiana	Italy		1						—	Operated for Turkish Airlines.
Middle East Airlines	Lebanon	Middle East Airlines Airbus A330-243	4					4	4	
MNG Airlines	Turkey	MNG Airlines Airbus A330-243F		2		4			6	
Monarch Airlines	United Kingdom	Monarch Airlines Airbus A330-243	2						—	Ceased operations in 2017.
Mongolian Airways	Mongolia		1						1	
MyTravel Airways	United Kingdom	MyTravel Airways Airbus A330-243	3		1				—	Merged with Thomas Cook Airlines in 2008.
National Airlines (N8)	United States	National Airlines Airbus A330-243	1						1	
Nepal Airlines	Nepal	Nepal Airlines Airbus A330-243	2						2	
Nordwind Airlines	Russia	Nordwind Airlines Airbus A330-223	2		3				5	No longer supported by Airbus due to the Russian invasion of Ukraine.
Northwest Airlines	United States	Northwest Airlines Airbus A330-323X	11		21				—	Merged with Delta Air Lines in 2010.
Novair	Sweden	Novair Airbus A330-223	6						—	
Oman Air	Oman	Oman Air Airbus A330-243	4		4				—	
Onur Air	Turkey	Onur Air Airbus A330-243	12		5				—	Ceased operations in 2022.
Orbest	Portugal	Orbest Airbus A330-343	2		1			2	2	A330-900 transferred to Iberojet.
Orbest Orizonia Airlines	Spain	Orbest Orizonia Airlines Airbus A330-343X	1		2				—	Ceased operations in 2013.
Pakistan International Airlines	Pakistan	Pakistan International Airlines Airbus A330-343			1				—	Leased from SriLankan Airlines.
Philippine Airlines	Philippines	Philippine Airlines Airbus A330-301			11				11	
PAL Airlines	Chile				1				—	Leased from Air Europa.
Plus Ultra Líneas Aéreas	Spain	Plus Ultra Airbus A330-202	5						5	
Qanot Sharq	Uzbekistan		2						2	
Qantas	Australia	Qantas Airbus A330-303	18		10				28	
Qatar Airways	Qatar	Qatar Airways Airbus A330-303X	3	8	7				10	
Really Cool Airlines	Thailand				3				—	
RwandAir	Rwanda	RwandAir Airbus A330-243	1		1				2	
Sabena	Belgium	Sabena Airbus A330-322	6		4				—	Ceased operations in 2001.
SalamAir	Oman							3	—	To be Leased from Avolon
Saudia	Saudi Arabia	Saudia Airbus A330-343	22		31			10	31	A330-200 leased from various airlines.
SBA Airlines	Venezuela	SBA Airlines Airbus A330-243	1						—	Leased from Hi Fly.
Scandinavian Airlines	Sweden; Norway; Denmark	Scandinavian Airlines Airbus A330-343			8				8	
Sentra Airways	United Kingdom		1						1	
Serene Air	Pakistan		3						3	
Shaheen Air	Pakistan	Shaheen Air Airbus A330-203	4		3				—	
Shanghai Airlines	China	Shanghai Airlines Airbus A330-243	4							
Shenzhen Airlines	China	Shenzhen Airlines Airbus A330-343			6				6	
Sichuan Airlines	China	Sichuan Airlines Airbus A330-243	7	3	7				17	
Singapore Airlines	Singapore	Singapore Airlines Airbus A330-343X			34				—	
Skyservice Airlines	Canada	Skyservice Airlines Airbus A330-322			5				—	
SmartLynx Airlines Malta	Malta	SmartLynx Airlines Malta Airbus A330-343			7				7	
SN Brussels Airlines	Belgium	SN Brussels Airlines Airbus A330-343			3				—	Merged with Virgin Express to form Brussels Airlines in 2006.
South African Airways	South Africa	South African Airways Airbus A330-343	11		2				2	
Southwind Airlines	Turkey	Southwind Airlines Airbus A330-223	2						2	
SriLankan Airlines	Sri Lanka	SriLankan Airlines Airbus A330-343	3		7				10	
Starlux Airlines	Taiwan	Starlux Airlines Airbus A330-941						7	7	
Sunclass Airlines	Denmark	Sunclass Airlines Airbus A330-243	3		1			2	3	
SunExpress Deutschland	Germany	SunExpress Deutschland Airbus A330-203	7						—	Operated by Eurowings.
Swissair	Switzerland	Swissair Airbus A330-223	16						—	Merged with Crossair to form Swiss International Air Lines in 2002.
Swiss International Air Lines	Switzerland	SWISS Airbus A330-223	15		14				14	
T'way Air	South Korea	T’way Air Airbus A330-223	5		4			5	9	
TACA Perú	Peru		1						—	Rebranded to Avianca Perú in 2013.
Tajik Air	Tajikistan		1						—	Leased from Southwind Airlines.
TAM Linhas Aéreas	Brazil	TAM Linhas Aéreas Airbus A330-223	22						—	
TAME	Ecuador		1						—	
Tampa Cargo	Colombia	Tampa Cargo Airbus A330-243F		2					—	Rebranded to Avianca Cargo in 2013.
TAP Air Portugal	Portugal	TAP Air Portugal Airbus A330-900	3		4			19	22	Launch customer of A330-900.
Tashkent Air	Uzbekistan		1						1	
Thai AirAsia X	Thailand	Thai AirAsia X Airbus A330-343			7			2	9	
Thai Airways International	Thailand	Thai Airways International Airbus A330-343X			6				6	
Thai Lion Air	Thailand	Thai Lion Air Airbus A330-343			3			7	—	Transferred to Lion Air.
Thomas Cook Airlines	United Kingdom	Thomas Cook Airlines Airbus A330-243	16						—	Leased one aircraft from AirTanker Services in 2015 for 3 years and a second added in April 2017, ceased operations in 2019.
Tianjin Airlines	China	Tianjin Airlines Airbus A330-243	4		2				6	
Tibet Airlines	China	Tibet Airlines Airbus A330-243	5						5	
TransAsia Airways	Taiwan	TransAsia Airways Airbus A330-343			4				—	Ceased operations in 2016.
TUI fly Belgium	Belgium		1						—	Leased from AirTanker Services.
Tunisair	Tunisia	Tunisair Airbus A330-243	2						2	
Turkish Airlines	Turkey	Turkish Airlines Airbus A330-343	14	10	36				60	Second largest operator, behind Delta Air Lines.
Turkmenistan Airlines	Turkmenistan	Turkmenistan Airlines Cargo Airbus A330-243P2F		2					2	
Uganda Airlines	Uganda	Uganda Airlines Airbus A330-800					2		2	
US Airways	United States	US Airways Airbus A330-243	15		9				—	Merged with American Airlines in 2015.
US-Bangla Airlines	Bangladesh	US-Bangla Airlines Airbus A330-343			2				2	Leased from Irish-based Avolon.
Uzbekistan Airways	Uzbekistan		2						—	Leased from Heston Airlines and Qanot Sharq.
VietJet Air	Vietnam	VietJet Air Airbus A330-343			8			40	8	
Vietnam Airlines	Vietnam	Vietnam Airlines Airbus A330-223	12		1				—	
Virgin Australia	Australia	Virgin Australia Airbus A330-243	8						—	
Virgin Atlantic	United Kingdom	Virgin Atlantic Airbus A330-343	4		10			8	14	
Virgin Blue	Australia		2						—	Rebranded to Virgin Australia in 2011.
Virgin Nigeria	Nigeria	Virgin Nigeria Airbus A330-243	1						—	Leased from British Midland International.
VIM Airlines	Russia		2						—	Ceased operations in 2017.
Wamos Air	Spain	Wamos Air Airbus A330-243	5		7				12	
Wizz Air	Hungary	Hungary Air Cargo Airbus A330-243F		1					–	Aircraft owned by the Hungarian government. Retired in December 2024.
World2Fly Portugal	Portugal	World2Fly Portugal Airbus A330-343			1				1	
Wow Air	Iceland	Wow Air Airbus A330-343			3				—	Ceased operations in 2019.
XL Airways France	France	XL Airways France Airbus A330-303	9		6				—	Leased from various airlines, ceased operations in 2019.
XL Airways UK	United Kingdom				1				—	Leased from Orbest, ceased operations in 2008.
Yemenia	Yemen	Yemenia Airbus A330-243	1						1	
Airline	Country	Photo	200	200F	300	300P2F	800	900	Total in service	Notes

== Military operators ==
As of June 2025, 11 countries have placed order for a total 93 of Airbus A330 MRTTs, of which 67 were delivered:

Country	Operator	On order	In service	Total
Australia	Royal Australian Air Force	-	7	7
Brazil	Brazilian Air Force	-	2	2
Canada	Royal Canadian Air Force	8	-	9
France	French Air and Space Force	3	12	15
Italy	Italian Air Force	6	-	6
Netherlands	Royal Netherlands Air Force	3	9	12
Saudi Arabia	Royal Saudi Air Force	4	6	10
Singapore	Republic of Singapore Air Force	-	6	6
South Korea	Republic of Korea Air Force	-	4	4
Spain	Spanish Air and Space Force	1	2	3
United Arab Emirates	United Arab Emirates Air Force	-	5	5
United Kingdom	Royal Air Force	-	14	14

== Government operators ==
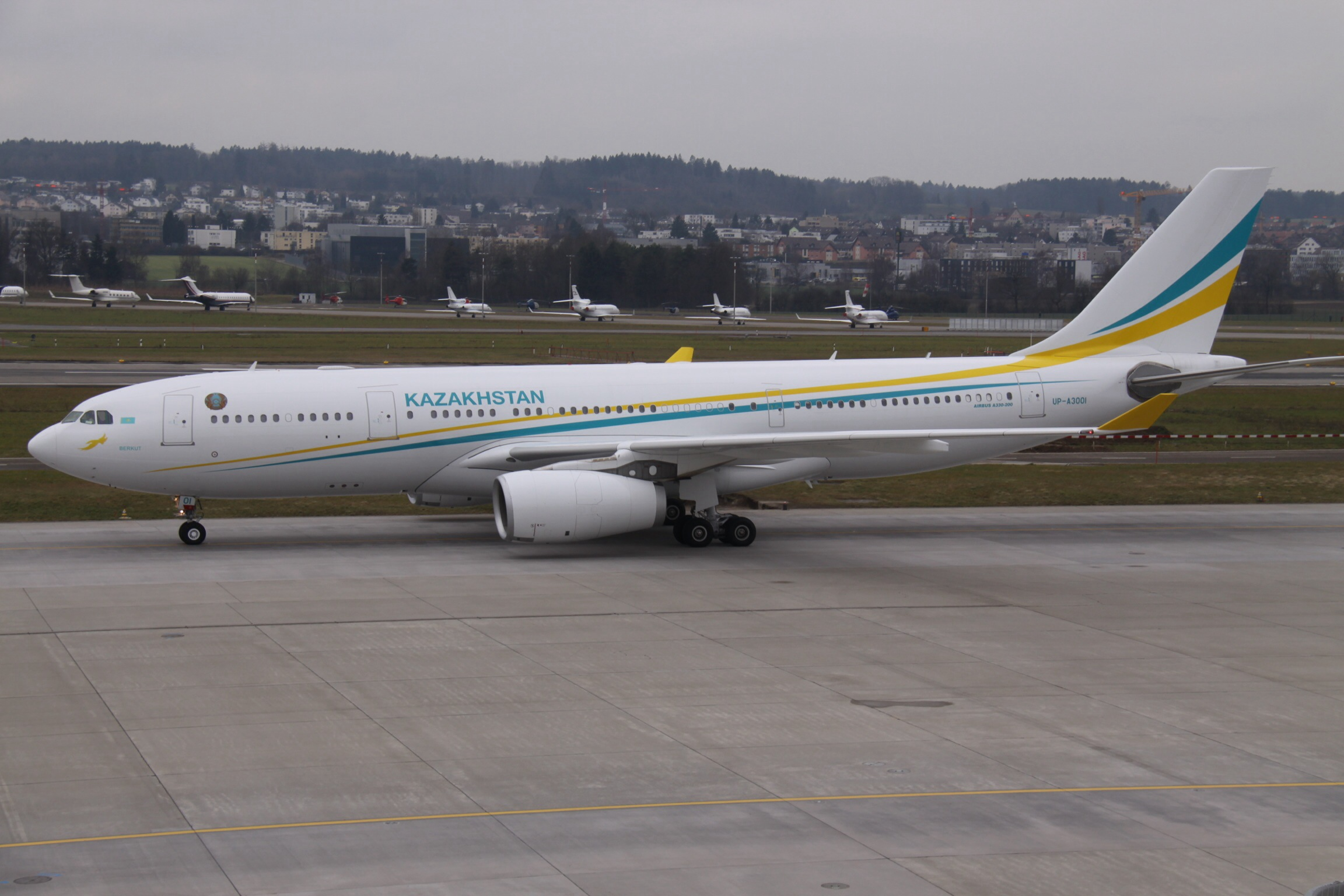
Airbus A330-200 of the Armed Forces of the Republic of Kazakhstan

Following countries operate A330-200 for VIP use.

- Armed Forces of the Republic of Kazakhstan – 1 in service
- French Air and Space Force – 1 in service
- Government of Brazil - 1 in service
- Government of Turkey – 1 in service
- Government of Thailand – 1 in service
- Government of Malaysia – 1 in service
- Royal Air Force – 1 in service
- Royal Canadian Air Force – 1 in service
- Qatar Amiri Flight – 2 in service
- Nigerian Air Force - 1 in service

== See also ==
- List of Airbus A330 orders and deliveries
- List of Airbus A340 operators
- list of Airbus A380 operators
- list of Airbus A310 operators

== Footnotes ==
Bibliography

- Norris, Guy and Mark Wagner (2001). Airbus A340 and A330. St. Paul, Minnesota: MBI Publishing, 2001. ISBN 0-7603-0889-6.
- Airbus Orders and Deliveries
