= List of Airbus A340 operators =

Set out below is a list of former and current operators of the Airbus A340 airliner.

== Operators ==
As of September 2026, approximately 70 Airbus A340 aircraft are in operation.

Airline	Country	200	300	500	600	Still in service	Notes
Aerolíneas Argentinas	Argentina	4	9				
Aerolíneas Estelar	Venezuela		1				Leased from Hi Fly Malta
Air Atlanta Icelandic	Iceland		2		2		
Air Belgium	Belgium		4				Replaced by Airbus A330-900
AirBlue	Pakistan		2				Ceased operations in 2014
Air Bourbon	France	1					Ceased operations in 2004; Transferred to Air Europa
Air Canada	Canada		13	2			A340-500 leased to TAM Linhas Aéreas
Air China	China		6				
Air Comet	Spain		3				Ceased operations in 2009
Air Europa	Spain	1					
Air France	France	6	24				Launch customer of A340-300
Air Jamaica	Jamaica		3				
Air Lanka	Sri Lanka		3				Rebranded as SriLankan Airlines in 1999
Air Leisure	Egypt	3					Leased from EgyptAir
Air Liberté	France	2	2				Ceased operations in 2003
Air Madagascar	Madagascar		2				
Air Mauritius	Mauritius		8				
Air Namibia	Namibia		2				
Air Tahiti Nui	French Polynesia	1	5				
AirX Charter	Malta		3		2	1	
AirAsia X	Malaysia		2				
Airhub Airlines	Malta		3				Transferred to Legend Airlines
Alpha Star	Saudi Arabia				1	1	
AOM French Airlines	France	3	2				Merged with Air Liberté in 2001
Arik Air	Nigeria			2			Leased from Hi Fly
Austrian Airlines	Austria	2	2				A340-200 sold to the French Air Force; A340-300 sold to Swiss International Air Lines
Avior Airlines	Venezuela		1				Transferred to Conviasa
Azerbaijan Airlines	Azerbaijan			2	1	1	
Azman Air	Nigeria				1		
Bek Air	Kazakhstan		3				
Brussels Airlines	Belgium		2				Operated for Eurowings
BWIA West Indies Airways	Trinidad		2				Rebranded to Caribbean Airlines in 2006
Caribbean Airlines	Trinidad		2				
Cathay Pacific	Hong Kong	4	18		3		A340-200 sold to Philippine Airlines; A340-600 sold to Hainan Airlines
China Airlines	Taiwan		7				
China Eastern Airlines	China		5		5		
China Southwest Airlines	China		3				Merged with Air China in 2002
Conviasa	Venezuela	2	1		3	6	
Corsair International	France		1				Leased from Hi Fly
Edelweiss Air	Switzerland		5			5	To be replaced with Airbus A350-900 by 2027.
EgyptAir	Egypt	3	1				A340-300 leased from Gulf Air
Emirates	UAE		8	10			Launch customer of A340-500
Etihad Airways	UAE		1	4	7		A340-300 sold to Hi Fly; A340-600 sold to European Aviation
Eurowings	Germany		2				Operated by Brussels Airlines
Government, Corporate, Private and undisclosed		5	33	7	24		
Finnair	Finland		7				
FlyX	Zimbabwe		5			5	Purchased from Hi Fly.
Garuda Indonesia	Indonesia		3				Leased from China Southwest Airlines
Gulf Air	Bahrain		10				
Hainan Airlines	China				3		
Hi Fly	Portugal		3	2			
Hi Fly Malta	Malta		8		4	4	
Iberia	Spain		21		18		
Iran Air	Iran	1					Leased from Conviasa
Iran Aseman Airlines	Iran		1			1	
Jet Airways	India		3				Leased from South African Airways
Joon	France		4				Reintegrated into Air France in 2019
Kam Air	Afghanistan		6			4	
Kuwait Airways	Kuwait		4				
LAN Airlines	Chile		5				
Legend Airlines	Romania		3			3	
Lufthansa	Germany	8	30		24	12	Launch customer of the A340 alongside Air France; A340-300 to be replaced by Boeing 787-9; Five A340-600 returned from long-term storage, later to be replaced by Airbus A350-1000
Mahan Air	Iran	1	9		8	15	Includes one aircraft nicknamed Deli Mike
Maleth-Aero	Malta				4		
Mandarin Airlines	Taiwan		1				
Olympic Airlines	Greece		4				Ceased operations in 2009
Philippine Airlines	Philippines	4	13				
Plus Ultra Líneas Aéreas	Spain		4		2		Retired in 2025.
Qatar Airways	Qatar				4		
Royal Brunei Airlines	Brunei	1					
Royal Jordanian	Jordan	4					
Sabena	Belgium	2	3				Ceased operations in 2001
Safi Airways	Afghanistan		1				
Saudia	Saudi Arabia		4				Leased from Hi Fly, AirAsia X and Kuwait Airways
Scandinavian Airlines	Sweden		8				
Singapore Airlines	Singapore		17	5			
South African Airways	South Africa	6	8		9	2	
SpiceXpress	India		1				Leased from Hi Fly Malta
SriLankan Airlines	Sri Lanka		7				
Surinam Airways	Suriname		3				
Swiss International Air Lines	Switzerland		15			4	To be replaced with Airbus A350-900 by 2027.
Syrian Air	Syria		2			2	
TAM Linhas Aéreas	Brazil			2			Leased from Air Canada
TAP Air Portugal	Portugal		4				
Thai Airways International	Thailand			4	6		
Turkish Airlines	Turkey		9				
Virgin Atlantic	UK		10		19		Launch customer of A340-600
Virgin Nigeria	Nigeria		2				Leased from Virgin Atlantic
XL Airways France	France		1				Leased from Hi Fly

== Orders and deliveries ==
The following is a list of orders and deliveries for the Airbus A340 by variant.

Customer	Orders				
Customer	A340-200	A340-300	A340-500	A340-600	Total
Air Canada		8	2		10
Air China		3			3
Air France	3	11			14
Air Mauritius		5			5
Air Tahiti Nui		4			4
AJW Capital Partners			2		2
Arik Air			2		2
Austrian Airlines	2	2			4
Cathay Pacific		15		3	18
China Airlines		6			6
China Eastern Airlines		5		5	10
China Southwest Airlines		3			3
EgyptAir	3				3
Emirates			10		10
Etihad Airways			4	7	11
Finnair		4			4
Flightlease		2			2
Governments; Executive and Private	6	1	5	2	14
Gulf Air		6			6
Iberia		18		16	34
International Lease Finance Corporation		16		13	29
Kuwait Airways		4			4
LAN-Chile		4			4
Lufthansa	7	28		24	59
Olympic Airlines		4			4
Philippine Airlines	4	4			8
Qatar Airways				4	4
Sabena	3	2			5
Scandinavian Airlines		7			7
Singapore Airlines		17	5		22
South African Airways		6		6	12
SriLankan Airlines		3			3
Swiss International Air Lines		9			9
TAP Air Portugal		4			4
Thai Airways			4	6	10
Turkish Airlines		7			7
Union de Transports Aériens (Note: All aircraft delivered to Air France.)		7			7
Virgin Atlantic		7		14	21
Totals	28	218	34	97	377

== See also ==
- List of Airbus A330 operators
