= List of airlines of Malta =

This is a list of airlines currently operating in Malta.

== Active ==
=== Scheduled airlines ===
Airline	Image	IATA	ICAO	Callsign	Founded	Notes
Eurowings Europe		E6	EWL	BLACK PEARL	2022	Formerly registered in Austria.
KM Malta Airlines		KM	KMM	SKY NIGHT	2024	Flag carrier.
Malta Air		AL	MAY	BLUE MED	2019	Wholly owned by Ryanair. Not to be confused with defunct carrier Air Malta.
Wizz Air Malta		W4	WMT	WIZZ AIR MALTA	2022	
Lauda Europe		LW	LDA	BEAUFORT	2020	
Universal Air		VO	UVL	UNIVERSALAIR	2018	

=== Charter airlines ===
Airline	Image	IATA	ICAO	Callsign	Founded	Notes
4 Airways			DAK	DUCK AIRWAYS	2023	
Air Atlanta Europe		CT	AAE	EUROVIKING	2002	
Air Charter Scotland Europe			SCO		2020	
Air CM Global			RJR	MELITA	2016	
Air Horizont		HT	HAT	SKY RUNNER	2011	Also based in Spain.
Airhub Airlines		AH	GJM	AIRHUB	2019	
AirX Charter			AXY	LEGEND	2011	
Avion Express Malta		4X	MLT	SOUTH WIND	2021	Subsidiary of Avion Express.
Comlux Malta			MLM	LUXMALTA	2008	
Corendon Airlines Europe		XR	CXI	TOURISTIC	2017	
Freebird Airlines Europe		MI	FHM	EUROBIRD	2018	
Galistair Malta		GH	GTR	GALISTAIR	2020	
Hi Fly Malta		5M	HFM	MOONRAKER	2013	
Luxwing		BN	LWG	LUXWING	2011	
Malta MedAir		MM	MMO	MALIT	2018	
Medavia		N5	MDM	MEDAVIA	1978	
NORDIC Sky			WET	BAREFOOT	2023	
SkyFirst LTD			KFE	MORITO	2012	
SmartLynx Airlines Malta		2N	LYX	MALTA CAT	2019	
Titan Airways Malta		TM	TMT	KAPOW	2021	
Valletta Airlines			HOT	SUNNY SKY	2023	
VistaJet		VJ	VJT	VISTA JET	2004	

=== Cargo airlines ===
Airline	Image	IATA	ICAO	Callsign	Founded	Notes
Bridges Air Cargo		5B	BRD	BRIDGES	2022	
Challenge Airlines		X6	CHZ	CARGO ROCK	2022	linked to Challenge Airlines IL

== Defunct ==
Airline	Image	IATA	ICAO	Callsign	Founded	Ceased operations	Notes
Air Malta (1946)					1947	1951	Formed by the merger of The Instone 1946 Ltd and British Aviation Services (Malta) Ltd. Absorbed into Malta Airlines.
Air Malta (1973)		KM	AMC	AIR MALTA	1973	2024	Replaced by KM Malta Airlines.
Air Malta Charter					1976	1979	
BAS					1946	1947	Merged with The Malta Instone Airline to form Air Malta (1946).
BritishJET			FHE		2004	2008	Virtual airline.
Cardiff Aviation Malta					2017	2017	Established as VVB Aviation Malta in 2015.
Efly		LE	LEF		2009	2009	Founded in June 2009 by Italian entrepreneur Luigi Crispino. Operating primarily as a regional airline between Malta and Catania, Sicily, it flew a single leased British Aerospace 146 BAe 146-300 variant aircraft registered 9H-ELE, but ceased all services after just two months.
Excellent Air					2010	2016	Owned by Fly Excellent Holding.
European 2000 Airlines			EUT	FIESTA	2005	2013	
Harbour Air Malta			HES		2007	2012	Harbour Air Malta, a subsidiary of Canadian operator Harbour Air, was established in June 2007 to provide seaplane charter and scheduled services in the Maltese islands. Utilizing a DHC-3 Turbo Otter floatplane permanently based in Valletta’s Grand Harbour, the airline operated 10-minute inter-island flights to Gozo and 30-minute aerial sightseeing tours, but ceased operations in 2012.
Hermes Aviation		H3	HME	HERGO	2014	2015	
Leaf			HFL	LOADSTAR	2021	2026	License revoked.
Maleth-Aero		DB	MLT	MALETH	2011	2026	License revoked.
Malta Air Charter		R5	MAC	MALTA CHARTER	1975	2004	Malta Air Charter was a subsidiary of Air Malta. It operated regular helicopter services linking the islands of Malta and Gozo from 1990 until it ceased operations on 1st November 2004.
Malta Airlines					1951	1973	Replaced by Air Malta (1973)
Malta International Airways					1964	1966	Operated Douglas DC-6
Malta Metropolitan					1963	1965	Operated Douglas DC-4
Maltafly					2013	2016	Operated Embraer EMB 120
Play Europe			FPE	GAMER	2024	2025	Operated A321neo
The Malta Instone Airline					1946	1947	Merged with BAS to form Air Malta (1946)
Valorfly			VLF		2015	2017	Operated Boeing 737-400, Gulfstream G500

== See also ==
- List of airlines of Europe
- List of defunct airlines of Europe
- List of airports in Malta
