= List of Airbus A330 orders and deliveries =

There are 2,005 firm orders for all versions of the Airbus A330; 1,481 for the A330ceo (current engine option) and a further 524 for the A330neo (new engine option), of which a total of 1,475 A330ceo and 199 A330neos have been delivered as of end of September 2026.

== History ==
On 12 March 1987, Airbus received the first orders for the twinjet. The domestic French airline Air Inter (then Air France Europe) placed five firm orders and 15 options while Thai Airways International requested eight aircraft, split evenly between firm orders and options. The following day, Airbus announced that it planned to formally launch the A330/A340 programme by mid-April 1987, and was on track to deliver the first A340 by May 1992 and the A330 the following year. On 31 March, Northwest Airlines followed Air Inter and Thai by signing a letter of intent for 20 A340s and 10 A330s.

Air Inter became the first operator of the A330 after accepting delivery on 30 December 1993 and placing the aircraft into service on 17 January 1994 between Orly Airport and Marseille. Deliveries to Malaysia Airlines (MAS) and Thai Airways International were postponed due to delamination of the composite materials in the engine thrust reverser assembly. Thai Airways received its first A330 during the second half of the year, operating it on routes to Taipei and Seoul from Bangkok on 19 December 1994. MAS received its A330 on 1 February 1995 then rescheduled deliveries of the 10 other aircraft on order. Cathay Pacific received Trent 700s in late March 1995, days after MAS following the certification of the engine on 22 December 1994.

== Orders and deliveries ==
The following is a list of orders, deliveries and backlog for the Airbus A330 by model as of 30 September 2026:

- Ord — number of aircraft ordered from Airbus by the specified customer
- Del — number of aircraft delivered by Airbus to the specified customer
- Bl — number of aircraft still to be delivered to the specified customer

| Customer | A330-200 | | | A330-200F | | | A330-300 | | | A330-800 | | | A330-900 | | | A330 family | | |
| Customer | Ord | Del | Bl | Ord | Del | Bl | Ord | Del | Bl | Ord | Del | Bl | Ord | Del | Bl | Ord | Del | Bl |
|---|---|---|---|---|---|---|---|---|---|---|---|---|---|---|---|---|---|---|
| AerCap | 11 | 11 | | | | | 15 | 15 | | | | | | | | 26 | 26 | |
| AerCap Ireland | | | | | | | 5 | 5 | | | | | | | | 5 | 5 | |
| Aer Lingus | 3 | 3 | | | | | 11 | 11 | | | | | | | | 14 | 14 | |
| Aeroflot | | | | | | | 11 | 11 | | | | | | | | 11 | 11 | |
| Aerolíneas Argentinas | 4 | 4 | | | | | | | | | | | | | | 4 | 4 | |
| Afriqiyah Airways | 4 | 4 | | | | | 2 | 2 | | | | | | | | 6 | 6 | |
| Air Algérie | 8 | 8 | | | | | | | | | | | 10 | 5 | 5 | 18 | 13 | 5 |
| AirAsia X | | | | | | | 20 | 20 | | | | | | | | 20 | 20 | |
| Aircalin | 2 | 2 | | | | | | | | | | | 2 | 2 | | 4 | 4 | |
| Air Canada | | | | | | | 8 | 8 | | | | | | | | 8 | 8 | |
| Air Caraïbes | | | | | | | 3 | 3 | | | | | | | | 3 | 3 | |
| Aircastle | 7 | 7 | | 3 | 3 | | | | | | | | | | | 10 | 10 | |
| Air China | 30 | 30 | | | | | 26 | 26 | | | | | | | | 56 | 56 | |
| Air Côte d'Ivoire | | | | | | | | | | | | | 2 | 2 | | 2 | 2 | |
| Air France | 8 | 8 | | | | | | | | | | | | | | 8 | 8 | |
| Air Greenland | | | | | | | | | | 1 | 1 | | | | | 1 | 1 | |
| Air Inter | | | | | | | 4 | 4 | | | | | | | | 4 | 4 | |
| Air Lease Corporation | 10 | 10 | | | | | 6 | 6 | | | | | 30 | 30 | | 46 | 46 | |
| Air Mauritius | 2 | 2 | | | | | | | | | | | | | | 2 | 2 | |
| Air Senegal | | | | | | | | | | | | | 2 | 2 | | 2 | 2 | |
| Altavair Ltd | | | | | | | 7 | 7 | | | | | | | | 7 | 7 | |
| Asiana Airlines | | | | | | | 6 | 6 | | | | | | | | 6 | 6 | |
| Austrian Airlines | 3 | 3 | | | | | | | | | | | | | | 3 | 3 | |
| Avianca | 10 | 10 | | 6 | 6 | | | | | | | | | | | 16 | 16 | |
| Avolon | | | | | | | | | | | | | 44 | 9 | 35 | 44 | 9 | 35 |
| AWAS Aviation Capital | 5 | 5 | | | | | 7 | 7 | | | | | | | | 12 | 12 | |
| Azul | | | | | | | | | | | | | 7 | 1 | 6 | 7 | 1 | 6 |
| Beijing Capital Airlines | 3 | 3 | | | | | 4 | 4 | | | | | | | | 7 | 7 | |
| British Midland International | 1 | 1 | | | | | | | | | | | | | | 1 | 1 | |
| BOC Aviation | | | | 5 | 5 | | 7 | 7 | | | | | 6 | 6 | | 18 | 18 | |
| Cathay Dragon | | | | | | | 5 | 5 | | | | | | | | 5 | 5 | |
| Cathay Pacific | | | | | | | 49 | 49 | | | | | 41 | | 41 | 90 | 49 | 41 |
| Cebu Pacific | | | | | | | 2 | 2 | | | | | 16 | 14 | 2 | 18 | 16 | 2 |
| China Airlines | | | | | | | 14 | 14 | | | | | | | | 14 | 14 | |
| China Eastern Airlines | 33 | 33 | | | | | 33 | 33 | | | | | 25 | | 25 | 58 | 33 | 25 |
| China Southern Airlines | 16 | 16 | | | | | 34 | 34 | | | | | | | | 50 | 50 | |
| CIT Group | 36 | 36 | | | | | 15 | 15 | | | | | 35 | 27 | 8 | 86 | 78 | 8 |
| Commonwealth Bank (Australia) | | | | | | | 2 | 2 | | | | | | | | 2 | 2 | |
| Condor | | | | | | | | | | | | | 14 | 7 | 7 | 14 | 7 | 7 |
| Corsair | 2 | 2 | | | | | | | | | | | | | | 2 | 2 | |
| Delta Air Lines | | | | | | | 10 | 10 | | | | | 53 | 37 | 16 | 63 | 47 | 16 |
| EgyptAir | 7 | 7 | | | | | 4 | 4 | | | | | | | | 11 | 11 | |
| Emirates | 28 | 28 | | | | | | | | | | | | | | 28 | 28 | |
| Etihad Airways | 14 | 14 | | 5 | 5 | | 6 | 6 | | | | | 6 | | 6 | 31 | 25 | 6 |
| EVA Air | 3 | 3 | | | | | | | | | | | | | | 3 | 3 | |
| Fiji Airways | 3 | 3 | | | | | | | | | | | | | | 3 | 3 | |
| Financial Institutions | 3 | 3 | | | | | 2 | 2 | | | | | | | | 5 | 5 | |
| Finnair | | | | | | | 8 | 8 | | | | | | | | 8 | 8 | |
| Flightlease | 9 | 9 | | | | | | | | | | | | | | 9 | 9 | |
| Flynas | | | | | | | | | | | | | 20 | | 20 | 20 | | 20 |
| Garuda Indonesia | 3 | 3 | | | | | 17 | 17 | | 4 | | 4 | 12 | 3 | 9 | 36 | 23 | 13 |
| GE Capital Aviation Services | 21 | 21 | | | | | 12 | 12 | | | | | 12 | 12 | | 45 | 45 | |
| Governments; Executive And Private Jets | 82 | 76 | 6 | | | | 1 | 1 | | 2 | 1 | 1 | | | | 85 | 78 | 7 |
| Groupe Dubreuil | | | | | | | 1 | 1 | | | | | | | | 1 | 1 | |
| Grupo Marsans | 4 | 4 | | | | | | | | | | | | | | 4 | 4 | |
| Gulf Air | 6 | 6 | | | | | | | | | | | | | | 6 | 6 | |
| Hainan Airlines | 3 | 3 | | | | | 18 | 18 | | | | | 2 | 2 | | 23 | 23 | |
| Hawaiian Airlines | 19 | 19 | | | | | | | | | | | | | | 19 | 19 | |
| Hi Fly | | | | | | | | | | | | | | | | 2 | 2 | |
| HiFly X Ireland | 2 | 2 | | | | | | | | | | | | | | 2 | 2 | |
| Hong Kong Airlines | 9 | 9 | | | | | 9 | 9 | | | | | | | | 18 | 18 | |
| Hong Kong International Aviation Leasing | | | | | | | 8 | 8 | | | | | | | | 8 | 8 | |
| HSH Nordbank | 2 | 2 | | | | | | | | | | | | | | 2 | 2 | |
| IAG | 3 | 3 | | | | | | | | | | | 21 | | 21 | 24 | 3 | 21 |
| Iberia | 16 | 16 | | | | | 8 | 8 | | | | | | | | 24 | 24 | |
| International Lease Finance Corporation | 68 | 68 | | | | | 30 | 30 | | | | | | | | 98 | 98 | |
| International Airfinance Corporation | 5 | 5 | | | | | 20 | 20 | | | | | | | | 25 | 25 | |
| ITA Airways | | | | | | | | | | | | | 10 | 9 | 1 | 10 | 9 | 1 |
| Jet Airways | 10 | 10 | | | | | | | | | | | | | | 10 | 10 | |
| Kingfisher Airlines | 5 | 5 | | | | | | | | | | | | | | 5 | 5 | |
| KLM | 7 | 7 | | | | | 1 | 1 | | | | | | | | 8 | 8 | |
| Korean Air | 8 | 8 | | | | | 22 | 22 | | | | | | | | 30 | 30 | |
| Kuwait Airways | | | | | | | | | | 4 | 4 | | 7 | 6 | 1 | 11 | 10 | 1 |
| LATAM Airlines Brazil | 15 | 15 | | | | | | | | | | | | | | 15 | 15 | |
| Lease Corporation International | | | | | | | 11 | 11 | | | | | | | | 11 | 11 | |
| Libyan Airlines | 4 | 4 | | | | | | | | | | | | | | 4 | 4 | |
| Lion Air | | | | | | | 6 | 6 | | | | | 2 | 2 | | 8 | 8 | |
| LTU International | | | | | | | 5 | 5 | | | | | | | | 5 | 5 | |
| Lufthansa | | | | | | | 19 | 19 | | | | | | | | 19 | 19 | |
| Mab Leasing | | | | | | | | | | | | | 20 | | 20 | 20 | | 20 |
| Malaysia Airlines | | | | 4 | 4 | | 25 | 25 | | | | | | | | 29 | 29 | |
| Meridian Aviation Partners Limited | | | | | | | 6 | 6 | | | | | | | | 6 | 6 | |
| MG Aviation | | | | | | | | | | | | | 2 | 2 | | 2 | 2 | |
| Middle East Airlines | 5 | 5 | | | | | | | | | | | 4 | | 4 | 9 | 5 | 4 |
| MNG Airlines | | | | 1 | 1 | | | | | | | | | | | 1 | 1 | |
| Monarch Airlines | 2 | 2 | | | | | | | | | | | | | | 2 | 2 | |
| MyTravel Airways | 4 | 4 | | | | | 3 | 3 | | | | | | | | 7 | 7 | |
| Northwest Airlines | 11 | 11 | | | | | 21 | 21 | | | | | | | | 32 | 32 | |
| Oman Air | 2 | 2 | | | | | 6 | 6 | | | | | | | | 8 | 8 | |
| Pembroke Aircraft Leasing 4 Ltd | | | | | | | 2 | 2 | | | | | | | | 2 | 2 | |
| Philippine Airlines | | | | | | | 23 | 23 | | | | | | | | 23 | 23 | |
| Qantas | 10 | 10 | | | | | 10 | 10 | | | | | | | | 20 | 20 | |
| Qatar Airways | 13 | 13 | | 5 | 5 | | 13 | 13 | | | | | | | | 31 | 31 | |
| RwandAir | 1 | 1 | | | | | 1 | 1 | | | | | | | | 2 | 2 | |
| Sabena | 3 | 3 | | | | | | | | | | | | | | 3 | 3 | |
| Saudia | | | | | | | 12 | 12 | | | | | 10 | | 10 | 22 | 12 | 10 |
| Scandinavian Airlines | | | | | | | 9 | 9 | | | | | 18 | | 18 | 27 | 9 | 18 |
| Shenzhen Airlines | | | | | | | 6 | 6 | | | | | | | | 6 | 6 | |
| Sichuan Airlines | 2 | 2 | | | | | 3 | 3 | | | | | | | | 5 | 5 | |
| SMBC Aviation Capital | | | | | | | | | | | | | 1 | 1 | | 1 | 1 | |
| South African Airways | | | | | | | 5 | 5 | | | | | | | | 5 | 5 | |
| SriLankan Airlines | 6 | 6 | | | | | 7 | 7 | | | | | | | | 13 | 13 | |
| Starlux Airlines | | | | | | | | | | | | | 3 | 2 | 1 | 3 | 2 | 1 |
| Swissair | 4 | 4 | | | | | | | | | | | | | | 4 | 4 | |
| Swiss International Air Lines | | | | | | | 16 | 16 | | | | | | | | 16 | 16 | |
| Synergy Aerospace Corporation | 6 | 6 | | | | | | | | | | | | | | 6 | 6 | |
| TAP Air Portugal | 5 | 5 | | | | | | | | | | | 12 | 10 | 2 | 17 | 15 | 2 |
| Thai Airways | | | | | | | 27 | 27 | | | | | | | | 27 | 27 | |
| Tianjin Airlines | 4 | 4 | | | | | 2 | 2 | | | | | | | | 6 | 6 | |
| Tibet Airlines | 5 | 5 | | | | | | | | | | | | | | 5 | 5 | |
| TransAsia Airways | | | | | | | 2 | 2 | | | | | | | | 2 | 2 | |
| TUI Travel | | | | | | | 2 | 2 | | | | | | | | 2 | 2 | |
| Tunisair | 2 | 2 | | | | | | | | | | | | | | 2 | 2 | |
| Turkish Airlines | 6 | 6 | | 9 | 9 | | 30 | 30 | | | | | | | | 45 | 45 | |
| Uganda National Airlines Company | | | | | | | | | | 2 | 2 | | | | | 2 | 2 | |
| Undisclosed customers | | | | | | | | | | | | | 22 | | 22 | 22 | | 22 |
| US Airways | 15 | 15 | | | | | 9 | 9 | | | | | | | | 24 | 24 | |
| VietJet Air | | | | | | | | | | | | | 40 | | 40 | 40 | | 40 |
| Virgin Atlantic | | | | | | | 6 | 6 | | | | | 11 | | 11 | 17 | 6 | 11 |
| Voyager Aviation Holdings | 4 | 4 | | | | | 16 | 16 | | | | | | | | 20 | 20 | |
| Waha Capital | | | | | | | 2 | 2 | | | | | | | | 2 | 2 | |
| Totals | 667 | 661 | 6 | 38 | 38 | | 776 | 776 | | 13 | 8 | 5 | 511 | 191 | 320 | 2,005 | 1,674 | 331 |

As of 30 September 2026.

Airbus A330neo firm orders, excluding options, commitments and agreements
| Initial date | Country | Customer | -800 | -900 | Combined |
|---|---|---|---|---|---|
| 19 Nov 2014 | United States | Delta Air Lines (Note: Launch customer of A330-900 variant) | — | 53 | 53 |
| 3 Dec 2014 | United States | CIT Group | — | 35 | 35 |
| 23 Dec 2014 | Ireland | Avolon | — | 44 | 44 |
| 9 Mar 2015 | United States | Air Lease Corporation | — | 30 | 30 |
| 13 Nov 2015 | Portugal | TAP Air Portugal (Note: Launch operator of A330-900 variant) | — | 12 | 12 |
| 19 Apr 2016 | Indonesia | Garuda Indonesia | 4 | 12 | 16 |
| 29 Nov 2016 | New Caledonia (France) | Aircalin | — | 2 | 2 |
| 15 Dec 2017 | Senegal | Air Senegal | — | 2 | 2 |
| 15 Dec 2017 | Singapore | BOC Aviation | — | 6 | 6 |
| 23 Aug 2018 | Indonesia | Lion Air | — | 2 | 2 |
| 15 Oct 2018 | Kuwait | Kuwait Airways (Note: Launch customer of A330-800 variant) | 4 | 7 | 11 |
| 25 Oct 2018 | Lebanon | Middle East Airlines | — | 4 | 4 |
| 21 Jan 2019 | China | SMBC Aviation Capital | — | 1 | 1 |
| 1 Feb 2019 | China | Hainan Airlines | — | 2 | 2 |
| 8 Apr 2019 | Uganda | Uganda Airlines | 2 | — | 2 |
| 17 Jun 2019 | United Kingdom | Virgin Atlantic | — | 11 | 11 |
| 4 Nov 2019 | Philippines | Cebu Pacific | — | 16 | 16 |
| 19 Nov 2019 | Ireland | GECAS | — | 12 | 12 |
| 18 Dec 2020 | Greenland | Air Greenland | 1 | — | 1 |
| 31 Mar 2021 | United States | MG Aviation | — | 2 | 2 |
| 29 Jul 2021 | Germany | Condor | — | 14 | 14 |
| 1 Dec 2021 | Italy | ITA Airways | — | 10 | 10 |
| 20 Sep 2022 | Ivory Coast | Air Côte d'Ivoire | — | 2 | 2 |
| 4 Nov 2022 | Brazil | Azul | — | 7 | 7 |
| 20 Apr 2023 | | Governments; Executive And Private Jets | 2 | — | 2 |
| 1 Jun 2023 | Algeria | Air Algerie | — | 10 | 10 |
| 21 Feb 2024 | Taiwan | Starlux | — | 3 | 3 |
| 22 Feb 2024 | Vietnam | VietJet | — | 40 | 40 |
| 25 Jul 2024 | Saudi Arabia | Flynas | — | 20 | 20 |
| 7 Aug 2024 | Hong Kong | Cathay Pacific | — | 30 | 30 |
| 23 Apr 2025 | Saudi Arabia | Saudia | — | 10 | 10 |
| 9 May 2025 | United Kingdom | IAG | — | 21 | 21 |
| 4 Jul 2025 | Malaysia | Mab Leasing | — | 20 | 20 |
| 18 Nov 2025 | UAE | Etihad | — | 6 | 6 |
| 26 Jun 2026 | China | China Eastern Airlines | — | 25 | 25 |
| 30 Jun 2026 | Sweden | Scandinavian Airlines | — | 18 | 18 |
| | | Undisclosed Customers | — | 22 | 22 |
| Total | | | 13 | 511 | 524 |

== See also ==
- List of Airbus A330 operators
