= EUT =

EUT may refer to:

- Eindhoven University of Technology, in Eindhoven, Netherlands
- Equipment under test
- European University of Tirana, in Tirana, Albania
- European Urology Today, a scientific journal
- European 2000 Airlines, a defunct airline of Malta
- EUT, an alternative rockband from the Netherlands
