= Flypass =

Flypass may refer to:

- Flypass, Air Malta's frequent flyer program
- Flypast
