= Clear-Com =

Manufacturer of electronic intercom products

- Type: Private
- Industry: Audio electronics, intercom
- Founded: 1968; 58 years ago, in San Francisco, California
- Founder: Charlie Butten, Bob Cohen
- Headquarters: Carlsbad, California, United States
- Owner: HME
- Website: https://www.clearcom.com/

Clear-Com is a manufacturer of electronic intercom products, widely used to enable stage management and crew communications in theatre, filmmaking, video and television production, concerts, professional sports competitions, special events and audiovisual presentations. Providing the first portable party-line intercom system to feature simple XLR cable connections, Clear-Com soon became an accepted industry standard. The National Academy of Television Arts & Sciences honored the company with a Technology and Engineering Emmy Award in 2010.

Clear-Com was founded in San Francisco, California, on April 18, 1968, by audio engineer Charlie Butten and his business partner Bob Cohen, a sound company owner who had recently been part of Family Dog Productions organizing dance concerts at the Avalon Ballroom. The first Clear-Com product was the RS-100 intercom station, a portable unit connected using standard XLR-terminated microphone cables. The connection scheme was based on twisted-pair telephone lines, with full duplex conversations carried on the inner two wires of the microphone cable. Butten added a momentary flashing signal light linked to the third conductor, the cable shield. The arrangement of beltpacks and headsets powered by a 30-volt DC base station allowed technical crew members to hear each other clearly over the loud sound systems of bands such as the Grateful Dead and Jefferson Airplane.

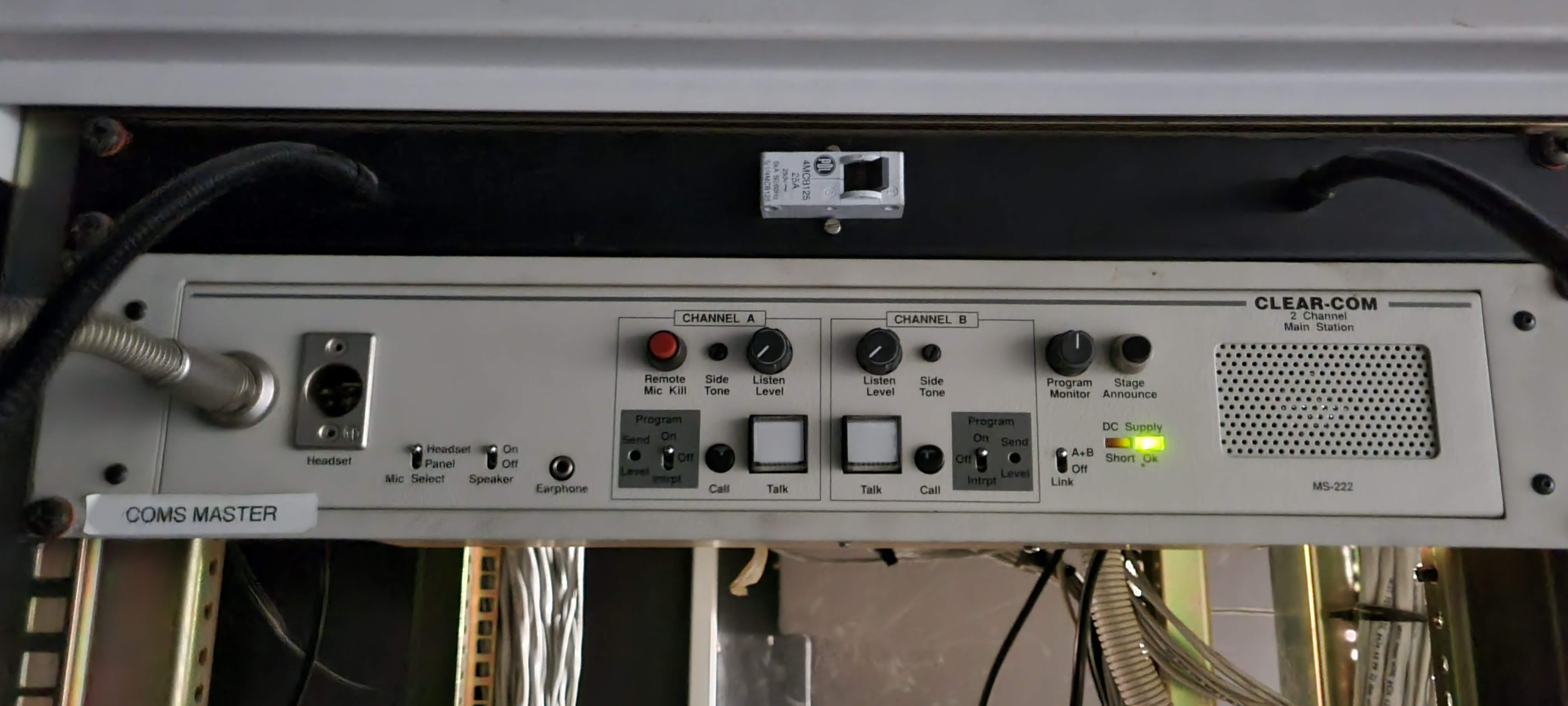
A two-channel intercom base station, manufactured in 1991

The product line of Clear-Com has expanded beyond party-line wired units to include multi-channel intercoms and wireless technology. Clear-Com patented a multi-channel wired digital intercom system in 2009, used in the HelixNet product line. The company's FreeSpeak wireless intercom was nominated in 2020 for a TEC Award.

Clear-Com was purchased in 2010 by Southern California electronics manufacturer HME, known for supplying wireless headsets for drive-through fast-food restaurant operations. Company headquarters were moved from Poway to Carlsbad, California, in 2018.
