= Macrophage elastase =

Identifiers
- EC no.: 3.4.24.65
- CAS no.: 2594837

Databases
- IntEnz: IntEnz view
- BRENDA: BRENDA entry
- ExPASy: NiceZyme view
- KEGG: KEGG entry
- MetaCyc: metabolic pathway
- PRIAM: profile
- PDB structures: RCSB PDB PDBe PDBsum
Search
- PMC: articles
- PubMed: articles
- NCBI: proteins

Macrophage elastase (EC 3.4.24.65, metalloelastase, human macrophage metalloelastase (HME), MMP-12) is an enzyme. This enzyme catalyses the following chemical reaction

Hydrolysis of soluble and insoluble elastin. Specific cleavages are also produced at -Ala^{14}-Leu- and -Tyr^{16}-Leu- in the B chain of insulin

This enzyme belongs to the peptidase family M10.

== See also ==
- Matrix metallopeptidase 12
