= KM Malta Airlines =

Flag carrier of Malta

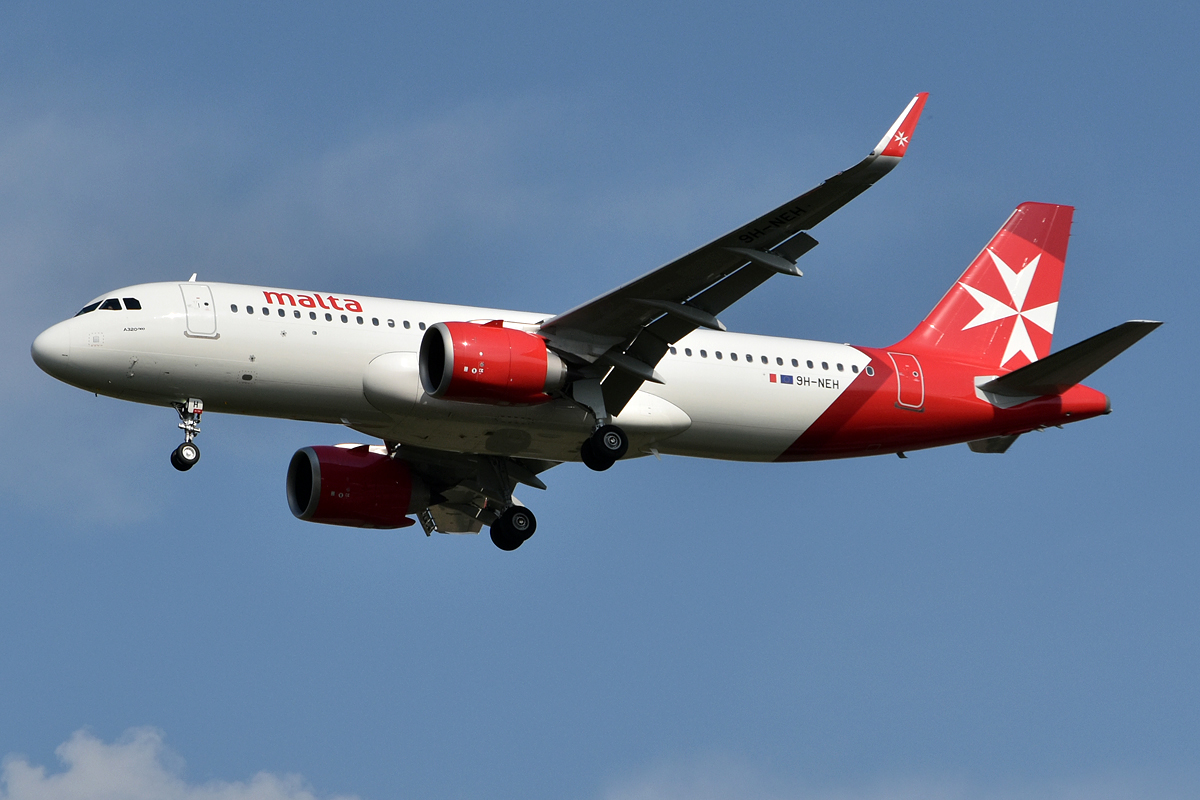
- KM Malta Airlines Airbus A320neo
IATA	ICAO	Call sign
KM	KMM	SKY KNIGHT
- Founded: 2 October 2023; 3 years ago
- Commenced operations: 31 March 2024; 2 years ago
- AOC #: MT-80
- Hubs: Malta International Airport
- Fleet size: 8
- Destinations: 17
- Parent company: Government of Malta
- Headquarters: Luqa, Malta
- Key people: David Curmi (executive chairman)
- Website: www.kmmaltairlines.com

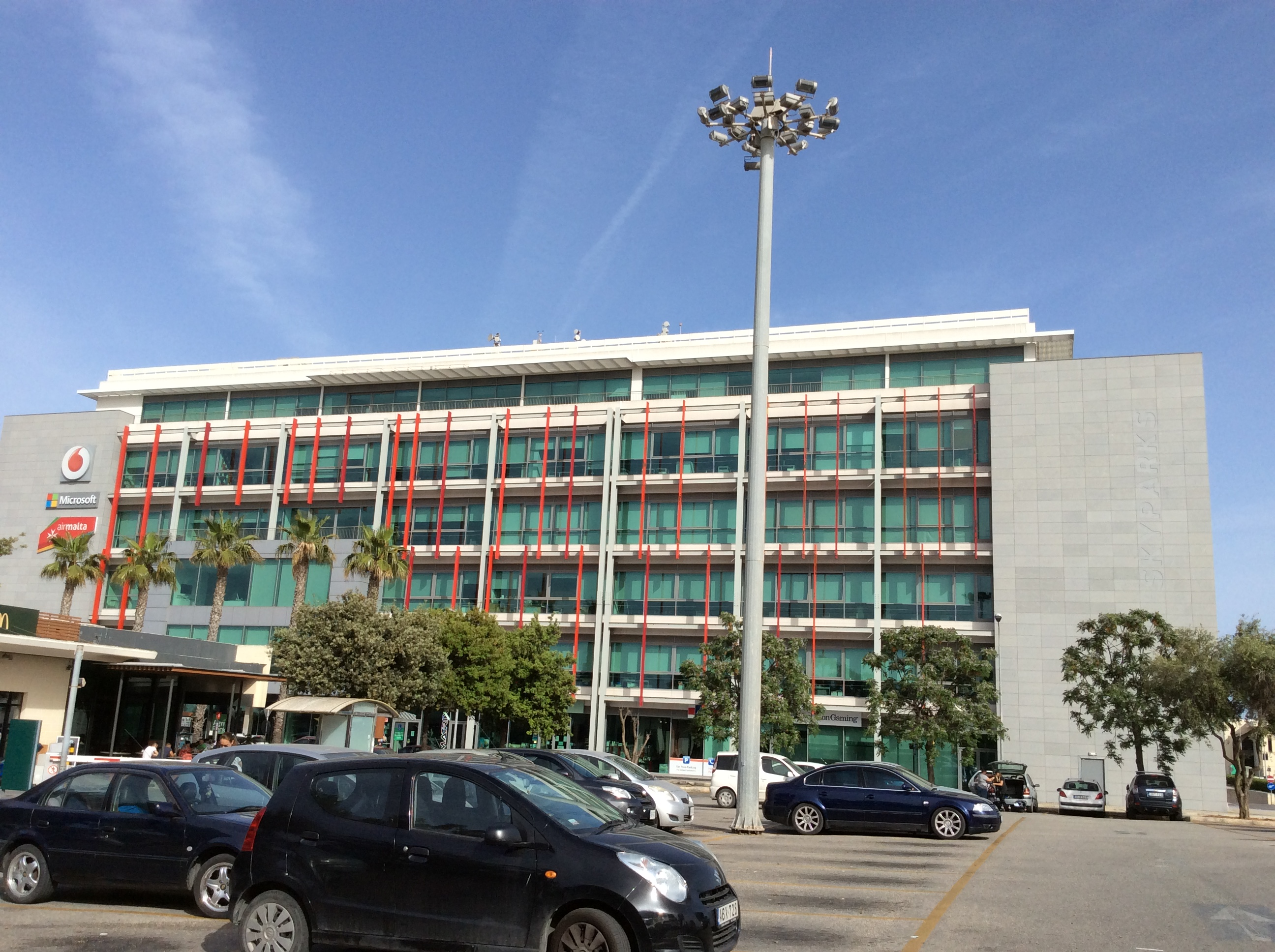
Sky Parks Business Center, the head office of KM Malta

KM Malta Airlines Ltd is the flag carrier of Malta headquartered in Luqa, and the successor to Air Malta. The airline operates scheduled passenger services to destinations between Malta and Europe using a fleet of Airbus aircraft, from its hub at Malta International Airport. It was established in 2024 following the cessation of operations of Air Malta, which it succeeded as Malta's national airline.

== History ==
=== Closure of Air Malta ===
Air Malta, the predecessor of KM Malta Airlines, struggled financially since its creation in 1973 ultimately leading to its demise. Before its closure, Air Malta was reportedly facing a loss of €30 million. European Union regulations preclude companies from receiving state aid more than once within 10-year periods. The chronically loss-making company had last received a state aid injection in 2012 and was again requesting aid in 2021 following the effects of the coronavirus pandemic.

In August 2022, the government announced it would dissolve Air Malta should the European Union deny further financial state aid to the airline. It would then move its assets to a succeeding carrier. Shortly after, the decision regarding the airline's future was delayed to the end of 2022; however, the route network and frequencies saw extensive cuts by October 2022, including the termination of several destinations.

The European Union announced in April 2023 that it would not allow the Maltese government to inject 290 million euros of state aid into the airline. In October, the government announced that Air Malta would cease operations at the end of March 2024 to be replaced by a new company, KM Malta Airlines, thereby side-stepping EU regulations on state aid.

=== Launch of KM Malta Airlines ===
During a press conference in October 2023, Robert Abela, the prime minister of Malta, stated that the newly recapitalized KM Malta Airlines would retain Air Malta's current fleet of eight Airbus A320 aircraft, even though the European Union initially wanted a reduction. Its initial route map included flights to 17+ airports in 15 key European cities from Malta: Amsterdam (AMS), Berlin (BER), Brussels (BRU), Catania (CTA), Düsseldorf (DUS), London (LGW & LHR), Lyon (LYS), Madrid (MAD), Milan (LIN), Munich (MUC), Paris (CDG and ORY), Prague (PRG), Rome (FCO), Vienna (VIE), and Zurich (ZRH). Air Malta operated to 37 destinations as recently as 2019.

It was also announced that the new airline will employ approximately 390 employees and will eventually phase out the early retirement schemes of Air Malta within the next four years. Refunds were offered starting 1 November 2023 for those with booked Air Malta flights beyond 30 March. Booking for flights with the new airline after March 31 went on sale on 1 December 2023. Those who accumulated air miles could be paid starting February 2024.

While the airline plans to eventually fly under Air Malta branding, the government was unable to fulfill its pledge that it would be able to do so at launch with the procurement process yet to be launched when the airline began flying. The new airline would be able to rent the Air Malta branding from the government (Note: Through the government-owned firm IP Holdings.) after a competitive process so its aircraft could fly under the Air Malta brand and the aircraft livery would continue to incorporate the Maltese Cross. Malta's finance minister, Clyde Caruana, announced that when the new airline is financially stable and making a profit, the government will begin the process of looking into partially privatizing the airline with the government remaining as majority shareholder.

On the day KM Malta Airlines launched, Illum reported that applicants for cabin crew positions were no longer required to be fluent in Maltese. This sparked outrage from the Nationalist Party and other politicians. Prime Minister Robert Abela was asked about this controversy during a press conference and stated that he expects cabin crew to speak Maltese and that it would be added as a prerequisite.

== Destinations ==
As of February 2026, KM Malta Airlines flies to the following destinations:

Country	City	Airport	Notes	Refs
Austria	Vienna	Vienna International Airport		
Belgium	Brussels	Brussels Airport		
Czech Republic	Prague	Václav Havel Airport Prague		
France	Lyon	Lyon–Saint-Exupéry Airport		
France	Paris	Charles de Gaulle Airport		
France	Paris	Orly Airport		
Germany	Berlin	Berlin Brandenburg Airport		
Germany	Düsseldorf	Düsseldorf Airport		
Germany	Munich	Munich Airport		
Israel	Tel Aviv	David Ben Gurion Airport		
Italy	Catania	Catania–Fontanarossa Airport		
Italy	Milan	Linate Airport		
Italy	Palermo	Falcone Borsellino Airport		
Italy	Rome	Rome Fiumicino Airport		
Malta	Malta	Malta International Airport	Hub	
Netherlands	Amsterdam	Amsterdam Airport Schiphol		
Spain	Madrid	Madrid–Barajas Airport		
Spain	Málaga	Málaga Airport		
Switzerland	Zurich	Zurich Airport		
Turkey	Istanbul	Istanbul Airport		
United Kingdom	London	Gatwick Airport		
United Kingdom	London	Heathrow Airport		

=== Codeshare agreements ===
KM Malta Airlines currently has codeshare agreements with the following airlines:

- airBaltic
- Air France
- Austrian Airlines
- Brussels Airlines
- ITA Airways
- KLM
- Lufthansa
- Swiss International Air Lines
- Turkish Airlines

== Fleet ==
=== Current fleet ===
As of July 2026, KM Malta Airlines operates the following aircraft:

KM Malta Airlines fleet
Aircraft	In service	Orders	Passengers			Notes
Aircraft	In service	Orders	J	Y	Total	Notes
Airbus A320neo	8	—	36	132	168	
Total	8	—				

=== Former fleet ===
As of August 2025, KM Malta Airlines operated 8 Airbus A320neo.

== Industry Rankings & Awards ==
- ch-aviation: Europe’s Youngest Aircraft Fleet 2025 & World’s Second Youngest Aircraft Fleet
- SKYTRAX: 4th Best Regional Airline in Europe in 2025
- APEX: APEX Four Star Major Airline for 2026
- Heathrow Airport: 1st in London Heathrow Fly Quieter and Greener Q2 2025
- AirHelp: 2nd Worldwide for On Time Performance in 2025 & 5th Best Airline Worldwide in 2025

== See also ==
- List of airlines of Malta
