= Linvemastat =

Investigational drug

Clinical data
- Other names: FP-020

Identifiers
- IUPAC name: 5-[3-[4-[(2-methyl-4-pyridinyl)methoxy]phenyl]sulfanylfuran-2-yl]imidazolidine-2,4-dione
- CAS Number: 2389060-50-6
- PubChem CID: 146262473
- ChemSpider: 129564913
- ChEMBL: ChEMBL5976402

Chemical and physical data
- Formula: C_{20}H_{17}N_{3}O_{4}S
- Molar mass: 395.43 g·mol^{−1}
- 3D model (JSmol): Interactive image
- SMILES: CC1=NC=CC(=C1)COC2=CC=C(C=C2)SC3=C(OC=C3)C4C(=O)NC(=O)N4
- InChI: InChI=InChI=1S/C20H17N3O4S/c1-12-10-13(6-8-21-12)11-27-14-2-4-15(5-3-14)28-16-7-9-26-18(16)17-19(24)23-20(25)22-17/h2-10,17H,11H2,1H3,(H2,22,23,24,25); Key:GUKPADSDFUIAMC-UHFFFAOYSA-N

Linvemastat is an investigational new drug that is being evaluated by Foresee Pharmaceuticals for the treatment of Asthma. It is a matrix metalloproteinase 12 inhibitor.
