= Malta Air Charter =

Domestic airline of Malta

| IATA | ICAO | Call sign |
|---|---|---|
| RS | MAC | Malta Charter |
- Founded: 1970
- Commenced operations: 1990
- Ceased operations: 1 November 2004
- Fleet size: See Fleet below
- Destinations: Gozo
- Parent company: Air Malta
- Headquarters: Malta

Malta Air Charter Company Limited was an airline based in Malta. It operated mainly helicopter services and domestic passenger shuttles between the Maltese Islands. It also leased aircraft from parent company, Air Malta, for charter operations. It ceased operations in 2004.

== Former code data ==
- IATA Code: R5
- ICAO Code: MAC
- Callsign: Malta Charter

== History ==
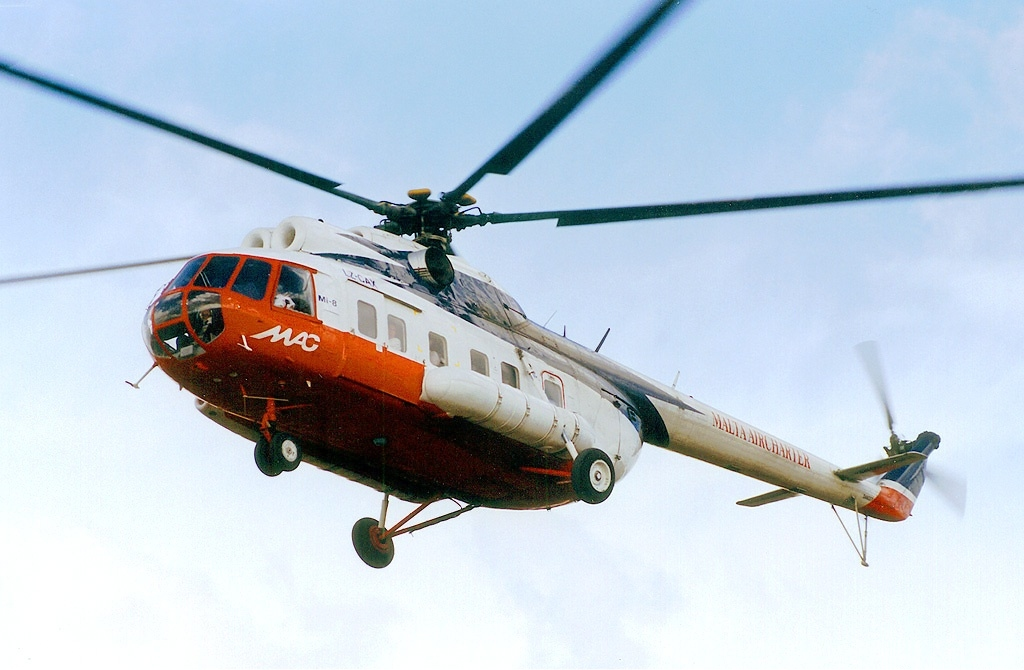
Malta Air Charter Mil Mi-8 in 2002

The airline was established in 1970, although it did not start operations until 1990 due to the many problems it faced. It ceased operations on 1 November 2004. It had operated helicopter services linking the islands of Malta and Gozo since 1990. Carrying 30,000 - 40,000 passengers per year, the service reached a peak of 64,000 passengers in 1994. However, demand eventually declined, and the operation was shut down by Air Malta.

== Fleet ==
Malta Air Charter operated the following aircraft:

- 3 Boeing 737-400
- 2 Mil Mi-8 (26 seat Soviet built helicopters)
