= Home market effect =

The home market effect is a hypothesized concentration of certain industries in large markets. The home market effect became part of New Trade Theory. Through trade theory, the home market effect is derived from models with returns to scale and transportation costs. When it is cheaper for an industry to operate in a single country because of returns to scale, an industry will base itself in the country where most of its products are consumed in order to minimize transportation costs. The home market effect implies a link between market size and exports that is not accounted for in trade models based solely on comparative advantage.

The home market effect was first proposed by Corden and was developed by Paul Krugman in a 1980 article. Krugman sought to provide an alternative to the Linder hypothesis. Based on recent research, the home market effect confirms Linder's sentiment that a nation's demand is a predicate for its exports, but does not support Linder's claim that differences in countries' preferences impede trade.

Krugman's model yields two related predictions regarding the effects of market size asymmetries on the geographic distribution of industry activity. Krugman (1980) demonstrates that a country with larger consumers of an industry's goods will run a trade surplus in that industry characterized by economies of scale. Helpman and Krugman (1985) show that the larger country's share of firms in that increasing returns industry exceed its share of consumers. Thus, a further development in the literature has been to examine the robustness of the home market effects (HMEs) under different modeling assumptions.

In the empirical literature, Head et al. (2001) show that, from a panel of U.S. and Canada, an increasing returns model where varieties linking to firms predicts HMEs. In contrast, a constant returns model with national product differentiation predicts reverse HMEs. Feenstra et al. (2001) also find reverse HMEs in a 'reciprocal-dumping' model. Behrens et al. (2005) further apply to a cross-section of OECD and non-OECD countries, and their main finding strongly backs the HMEs prediction, especially between OECD countries. Huang et al. (2007) derive the gravity equation, using the U.S. patent stock of 2002 for six industries, and find that the more the technology intensity of an industry, the higher the effect of the technology advantage to offset HMEs and more likely to reverse the HMEs.

On theoretical side, Davis (1998) shows that if both homogeneous and differentiated goods have identical transport costs, then the HMEs disappear. Head et al. (2002) considers four kinds of horizontal product differentiation models to examine the pervasiveness of the HMEs. Reverse HMEs are found based on the Markusen-Venables (1988) model that varieties are linking to nations rather than firms. Behrens (2005) discusses the HMEs in the context of regional economics. When non-traded goods are taken into consideration, the HMEs may be offset, whereas a reverse HME may arise. Yu (2005) shows that if consumer preference follows the form of a constant demand elasticity of substitution between the homogeneous and the composite of differentiated goods, then the reverse HMEs may occur depending on the level of elasticity.
