= HM Electronics =

American communications technology company

Harrison Miyahira Electronics (HME)
- Industry: Telecommunications, professional audio, and wireless communications
- Founded: 1971
- Founder: Harrison “Harry” Miyahira
- Headquarters: Carlsbad, USA
- Number of employees: ~1000
- Website: https://www.hme.com

HM Electronics, Inc. (HME) is an American communications technology company headquartered in Carlsbad, California, United States. Founded in 1971 by electrical engineer Harrison "Harry" Miyahira, the company develops communication, audio, and software solutions for industries including quick-service restaurants, broadcasting, live events, public safety, military, aerospace, and government applications.

HME is the parent company of several communications brands, including Clear-Com, a provider of professional intercom systems used in broadcast, live production, sports, and government communications.

== History ==
HM Electronics was founded in 1971 by electrical engineer Harry Miyahira. The company initially focused on wireless microphones and later expanded into wireless intercom systems.

In 1983, HME introduced a wireless drive-thru headset system for the quick-service restaurant industry.

In April 2010, HME acquired Clear-Com Communication Systems from The Vitec Group plc's Videocom division for an undisclosed sum, reported by industry press to be worth up to £8.7 million. Clear-Com continued operating as a wholly owned subsidiary of HME, retaining its Alameda, California headquarters along with research and development operations in Cambridge, UK, and Montreal, Canada.

Both HME and Clear-Com received Technology & Engineering Emmy Awards from the National Academy of Television Arts & Sciences in 2010, in recognition of contributions to the entertainment and live event industries.

In 2018, HME relocated its headquarters to a 140,000-square-foot custom-built facility in Carlsbad, California, consolidating administration, customer support, engineering, and manufacturing functions under one roof.

== Operations ==
HME develops communication technologies for:

- Quick-service restaurants
- Broadcast production
- Live events
- Sports operations
- Public safety
- Military, aerospace, and government

The company serves customers worldwide through company-owned offices, distributors, and service partners.

== Subsidiaries ==
=== Clear-Com ===
Clear-Com is a manufacturer of professional wired, wireless, and IP-based intercom systems used in broadcast, live entertainment, sports, and government communications. HME acquired the company from The Vitec Group in 2010.

=== HME Hospitality & Specialty Communications ===
HME Hospitality & Specialty Communications (HSC) provides drive-thru communication systems, timers, and related solutions for quick-service restaurants. HME's drive-thru headset systems have been adopted by national restaurant chains including Checkers and Rally's, and the company received El Pollo Loco's vendor Award of Excellence in the Services & Technology category in 2015.

== Products ==
HME's products include:

- Wireless intercom systems
- Drive-thru headset systems
- Drive-thru timer systems
- IP communication solutions
- Broadcast communication systems
- Restaurant software and analytics solutions
