= Airhub Airlines =

Maltese charter airline

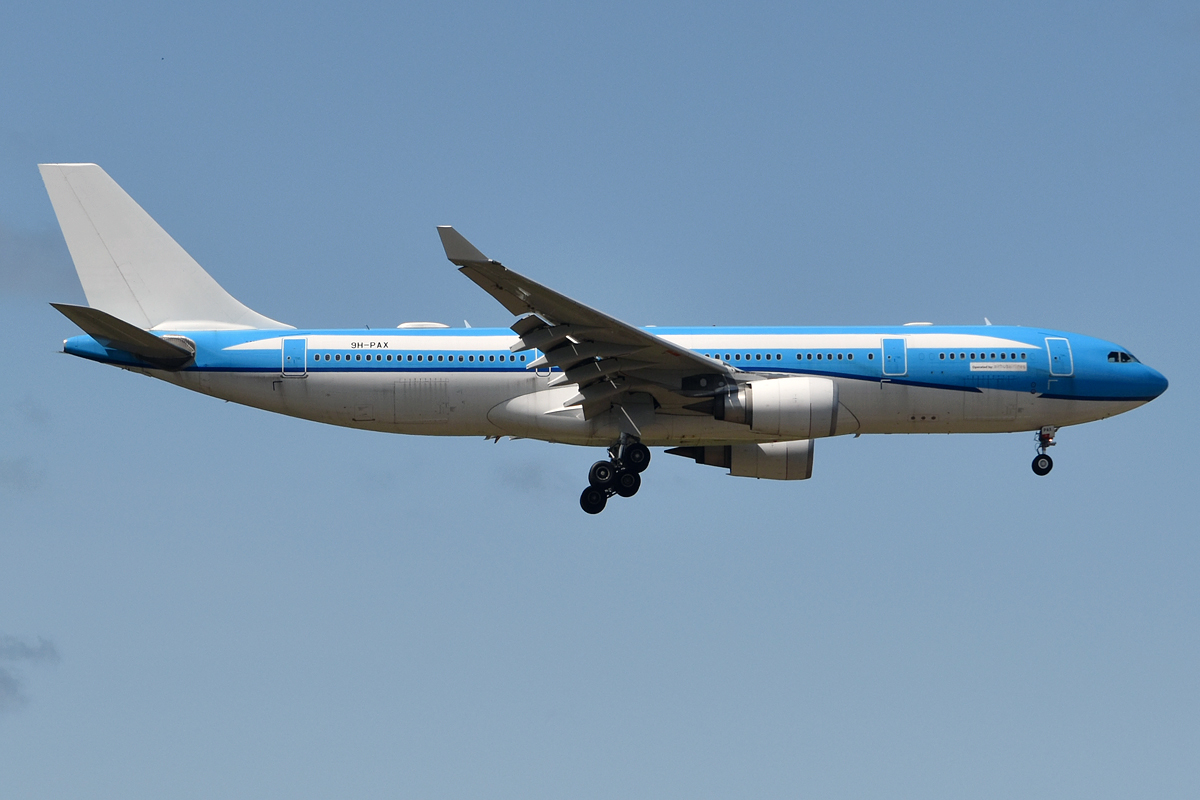
- An ex-KLM Airbus A330-200 of Airhub (2023)
IATA	ICAO	Call sign
AH	GJM	—
- Founded: 18 November 2019
- Commenced operations: 25 August 2020
- Hubs: Malta International Airport
- Fleet size: 1
- Headquarters: Luqa
- Website: airhubairlines.aero

Airhub Airlines is a charter airline based in Luqa, Malta. It is a sister company of Lithuanian charter airline GetJet Airlines. Airhub operates charter and cargo flights to destinations worldwide, using its own, leased, or commercially operated aircraft. Its main focus is on ACMI leasing.

== History ==
Airhub Airlines was founded on 18 November 2019, by GetJet Airlines. Airhub Aviation received its AOC on 13 July 2020, and it launched operations on 25 August 2020. In 2022, Airhub Airlines obtained its IOSA safety audit. In March 2025, Airhub expanded its maintenance capacity in Lithuania.

== Fleet ==
=== Current fleet ===
As of July 2026, Airhub Airlines operates the following aircraft:

Aircraft	Active	Stored	Capacity
Airbus A320-200	1		180
Total	1		

=== Former fleet ===
The airline previously operated the following aircraft:

- Airbus A330-200
- Airbus A330-300
- Airbus A330-900
- Airbus A340-300

== See also ==
- List of airlines of Malta
- List of charter airlines
