= Heat and moisture exchanger =

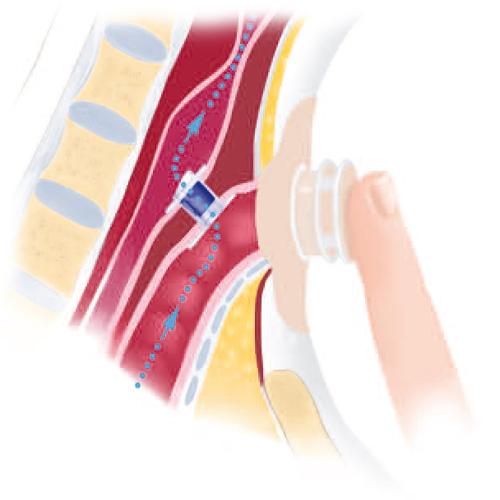
Heat and Moisture Exchanger

Heat and moisture exchangers (HME) are devices used in mechanically ventilated patients intended to help prevent complications due to "drying of the respiratory mucosa, such as mucus plugging and endotracheal tube (ETT) occlusion." HMEs are one type of commercial humidification system, which also include non-heated-wire humidifiers and heated-wire humidifiers.

HMEs have been in clinical use for over 30 years.

An HME cassette plays a central part of lung rehabilitation after a total laryngectomy.

== In mechanically ventilated patients ==
Humidification and suctioning are necessary to manage secretions in patients on mechanical ventilation. According to Branson (2007), the optimal humidification level "has been not well defined, but it is clear that in a patient with thick and copious secretions a heated humidifier is preferred to an HME".

In patients with acute lung injury and acute respiratory distress syndrome conventional humidifiers are preferred to HMEs for improved elimination of carbon dioxide.

== In laryngectomy ==
An HME has three purposes for patients with tracheostomies or laryngectomies:

1. heat and moisture exchanging capacity,
2. resistance, and
3. filtering particles.

In the lungs a temperature of 37 °C and 100% relative humidity (RH) is the ideal condition for the ciliary activity. If the conditions are too warm or cold, the cilia beat slower and at some point not at all. During normal nasal inspiration, air of 22 °C and 40% RH is conditioned into air of 32 °C and 99% RH at the level of the trachea.

The effect of the increased resistance (compared to stoma breathing without HME) in laryngectomy patients is poorly understood, but HMEs add a variable resistance to the airflow resistance, depending on the flow rate, though the outcomes of studies are not consistent.

HME cassettes with an electrostatic filter are designed to enhance the protection against airborne microbes to help to reduce the transfer of viruses and bacteria. Wearing an HME cassette does not compensate for the loss of upper airway filtration of smaller particles such as bacteria and viruses; the pores of the HME filter are larger than the diameter of the infectious particles. Only larger particles are filtered by the HME.

== Properties ==
The basic components of heat and moisture exchangers are foam, paper, or a substance which acts as a condensation and absorption surface. The material is often impregnated with hygroscopic salts such as calcium chloride, to enhance the water-retaining capacity. HMEs used for laryngectomees are mostly hygroscopic. HMEs can vary in size but they are designed to fit all adhesives or other attachment devices within a certain product line. HME cassettes for tracheotomy patients vary in size and are usually a bit larger than for laryngectomy patients. Air openings are at the side or at the front of the HME. Some designs use crossbars to prevent clothing from blocking. Usually a rim on the lid helps to find the correct finger position for occlusion.

=== Hands-free ===
A hands-free HME enables laryngectomy patients with tracheoesophageal voice prostheses to speak without requiring finger occlusion. The device consists of a combination of HME and an automatic speaking valve. The valve closes automatically when exhaling air for speaking, enabling the pulmonary air to be diverted through the tracheoesophageal voice prosthesis into the esophagus. It reopens automatically when exhalation decreases. Besides that, the hands-free HME enables easy removal in case of coughing, or even an adjustable cough relief valve, to release the air that is built up during coughing. In some devices, speech membranes in different strengths can accommodate different speaking pressures.

== Special devices ==
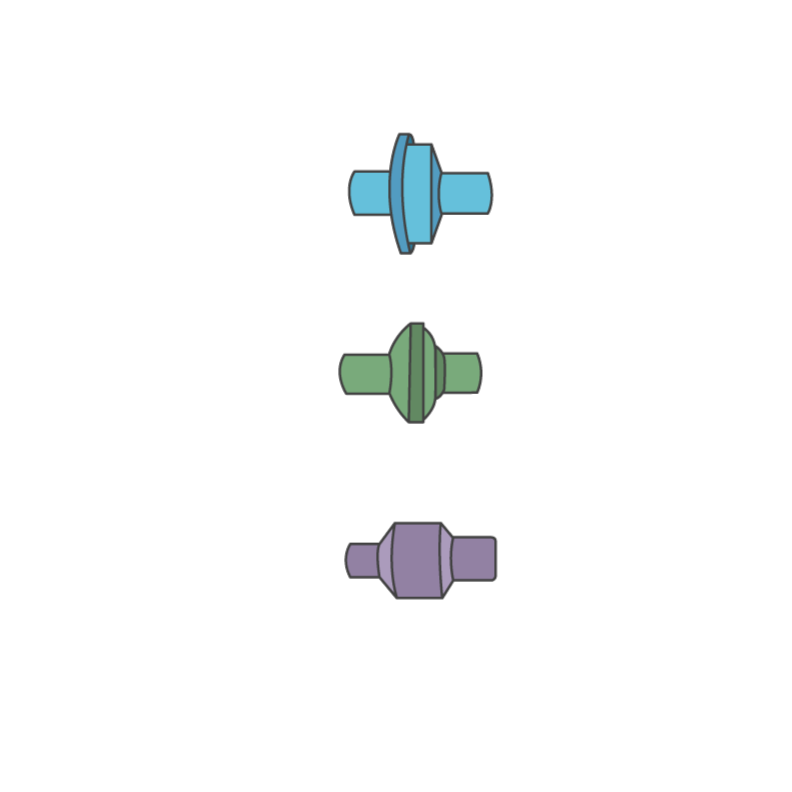
HME, HMEF, and bacterial viral filters

HME devices with a lower airflow resistance make them suitable for physical exercise or when adapting to the breathing resistance for patients that have not used any stoma protection before and start using an HME or have not used an HME for a longer time.

As antimicrobial filters, an HME is not considered to be an efficient barrier for microorganisms due to a relatively poor bacterial filtration capacity. Some HMEs provide an electrostatic filter for some protection from small particles and airborne microorganisms.
