= Matrix metallopeptidase 12 =

Enzyme involved in breakdown of extracellular matrix

macrophage elastase

Identifiers
- EC no.: 3.4.24.65
- CAS no.: 146888-86-0

Databases
- BRENDA: enzyme data
- ExPASy: NiceZyme view
- KEGG: enzyme entry
- MetaCyc: metabolic pathway
- Rhea: reactions
- PDB structures: RCSB PDB PDBe PDBsum
- Gene Ontology: AmiGO / QuickGO
Search
- PMC: articles
- PubMed: articles
- NCBI: proteins

MMP12
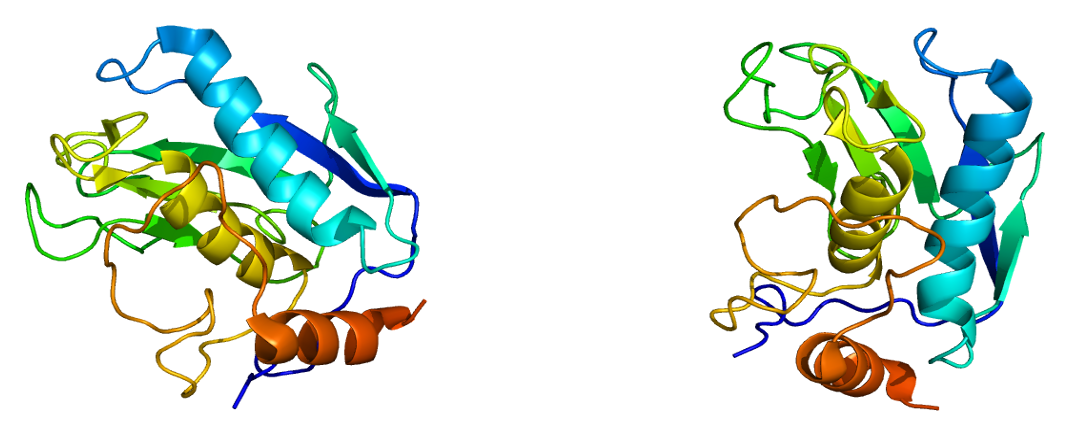

Identifiers
- Aliases: MMP12, HME, ME, MME, MMP-12, Matrix metallopeptidase 12
- External IDs: OMIM: 601046; MGI: 97005; GeneCards: MMP12
Available structures
PDB	Ortholog search: PDBe RCSB
PDB	List of PDB id codes 1JIZ, 1JK3, 1OS2, 1OS9, 1RMZ, 1ROS, 1UTT, 1UTZ, 1Y93, 1YCM, 1Z3J, 2HU6, 2JXY, 2K2G, 2K9C, 2KRJ, 2MLR, 2MLS, 2OXU, 2OXW, 2OXZ, 2POJ, 2W0D, 2WO8, 2WO9, 2WOA, 2Z2D, 3BA0, 3EHX, 3EHY, 3F15, 3F16, 3F17, 3F18, 3F19, 3F1A, 3LIK, 3LIL, 3LIR, 3LJG, 3LK8, 3LKA, 3N2U, 3N2V, 3NX7, 3RTS, 3RTT, 3TS4, 3TSK, 3UVC, 4EFS, 4GQL, 4GR0, 4GR3, 4GR8, 4GUY, 4H30, 4H49, 4H76, 4H84, 4I03, 4IJO, 2N8R, 5I4O, 5I0L, 5I2Z, 5I3M, 5I43
Enzyme activity
EC #	BRENDA	ExPASy	KEGG	MetaCyc
3.4.24.65	↗	↗	↗	↗

Gene location (Human)
Chr.	Chromosome 11 (human)
Band	11q22.2	Start	102,862,736 bp
Band	11q22.2	End	102,874,982 bp

Gene location (Mouse)
Chr.	Chromosome 9 (mouse)
Band	9 A1|9 2.46 cM	Start	7,344,381 bp
Band	9 A1|9 2.46 cM	End	7,369,499 bp
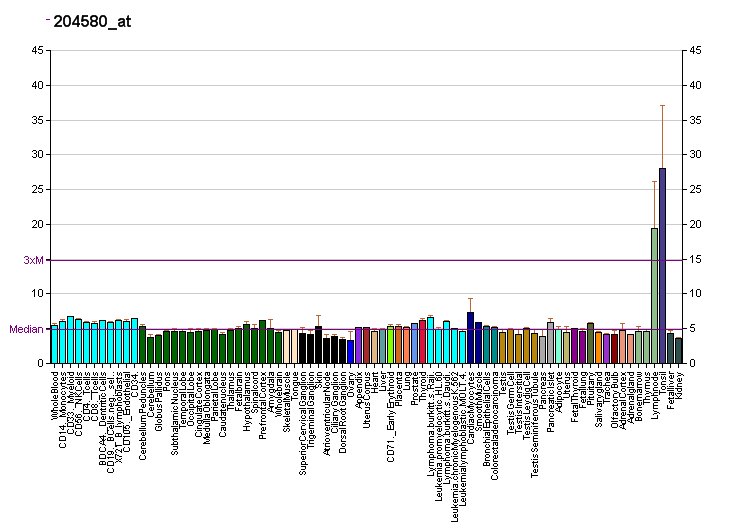
RNA expression pattern
Bgee	Human / Mouse (ortholog); Top expressed in: periodontal fiber; mucosa of ileum; mucosa of sigmoid colon; decidua; cartilage tissue; appendix; amniotic fluid; rectum; testicle; epithelium of nasopharynx / Top expressed in: zygote; secondary oocyte; lactiferous gland; embryo; calvaria; embryo; blastocyst; primary oocyte; right kidney; adrenal gland; More reference expression data
BioGPS	More reference expression data
Gene ontology
Molecular function	peptidase activity; endopeptidase activity; hydrolase activity; metallopeptidase activity; metal ion binding; serine-type endopeptidase activity; metalloendopeptidase activity; calcium ion binding; collagen binding; zinc ion binding; sequence-specific DNA binding
Cellular component	extracellular matrix; extracellular region; extracellular space; nucleus; cytoplasm
Biological process	collagen catabolic process; wound healing, spreading of epidermal cells; extracellular matrix disassembly; positive regulation of epithelial cell proliferation involved in wound healing; wound healing; negative regulation of transcription by RNA polymerase II; proteolysis; protein import into nucleus; positive regulation of gene expression; positive regulation of transcription by RNA polymerase II; regulation of defense response to virus by host; negative regulation of type I interferon-mediated signaling pathway; positive regulation of type I interferon-mediated signaling pathway; cellular response to virus; response to hypoxia; elastin catabolic process; negative regulation of endothelial cell-matrix adhesion via fibronectin; extracellular matrix organization; response to amyloid-beta
Sources:Amigo / QuickGO
Orthologs
Databases	NCBI: entry; OMA: entry
Species	Human	Mouse
Entrez	4321	17381
Ensembl	ENSG00000262406	ENSMUSG00000049723
UniProt	P39900	P34960
RefSeq (mRNA)	NM_002426	NM_008605; NM_001320076; NM_001320077
RefSeq (protein)	NP_002417	NP_001307005; NP_001307006; NP_032631
Location (UCSC)	Chr 11: 102.86 – 102.87 Mb	Chr 9: 7.34 – 7.37 Mb
PubMed search
- Wikidata
View/Edit Human	View/Edit Mouse

Matrix metalloproteinase-12 (MMP-12) also known as macrophage metalloelastase (MME) or macrophage elastase (ME) is an enzyme that in humans is encoded by the MMP12 gene.

== Function ==
Proteins of the matrix metalloproteinase (MMP) family are involved in the breakdown of extracellular matrix in normal physiological processes, such as embryonic development, reproduction, and tissue remodeling, as well as in disease processes, such as arthritis and metastasis. Most MMP's are secreted as inactive proproteins. The prodomain is cleaved by extracellular proteinases when the enzyme is activated. The active enzyme is constituted by two domains, the catalytic domain responsible for its enzymatic activity and the hemopexin-like domain that in some MMPs plays a role in substrate recognition and can contribute to increasing catalytic efficiency. It is thought that the protein encoded by this gene is cleaved at both ends to yield the active enzyme, but this processing has not been fully described. The enzyme degrades soluble and insoluble elastin. The gene is part of a cluster of MMP genes which localize to chromosome 11q22.3.

== Clinical significance ==
MMP12 may play a role in aneurysm formation and studies in mice and humans suggest a role in the development of emphysema.

Linvemastat (FP-020) and aderamastat (FP‑025) and are MMP12 selective inhibitors that are being evaluated for the treatment of asthma.
