= Air Malta =

Maltese airline (1973–2024)

Air Malta plc
IATA	ICAO	Call sign
KM	AMC	AIR MALTA
- Founded: 31 March 1973; 53 years ago
- Commenced operations: 1 April 1974; 52 years ago
- Ceased operations: 30 March 2024; 2 years ago
- AOC #: MT-01
- Hubs: Malta International Airport
- Frequent-flyer program: Flypass; KMiles
- Subsidiaries: Malta MedAir
- Fleet size: 7
- Destinations: 20
- Headquarters: Luqa, Malta
- Key people: David Curmi (Executive Chairman); Declan Keller (Chief Operations Officer & Accountable Manager)
- Employees: 375
- Website: www.airmalta.com

Air Malta, stylized as airmalta, was a Maltese airline headquartered in Luqa and based at Malta International Airport. It operated services as the country's flag carrier to destinations in Europe, the Middle East and North Africa, venturing even as far as New York. Air Malta ceased operations on 30 March 2024 and was replaced on the next day with a new flag carrier, KM Malta Airlines.

== History ==
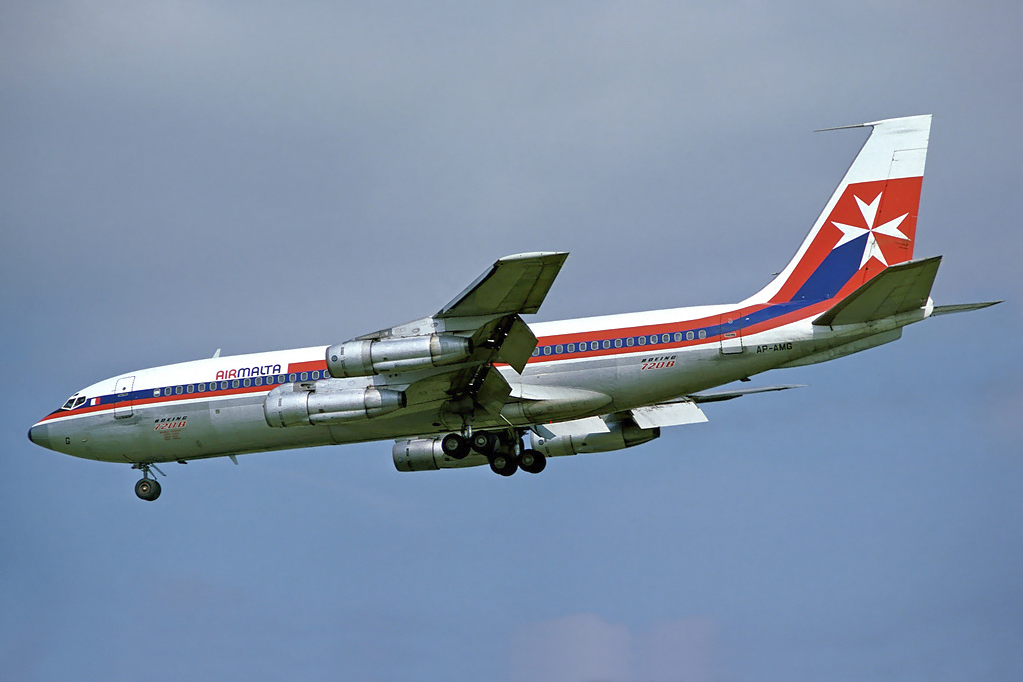
Air Malta leased its first Boeing 720B's in 1974 and they were joined by another three a few years later.

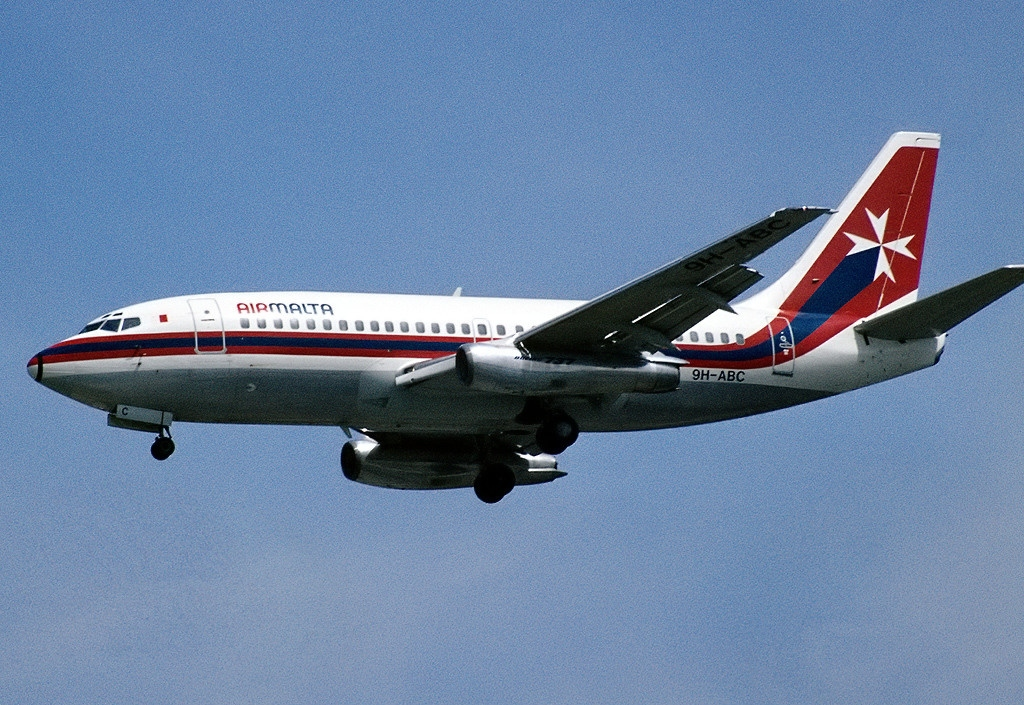
Once a mainstay of the fleet, the Boeing 737-200 series has since been phased out, seen here at London Heathrow Airport in 1983.

=== Early years ===
Shortly after the Second World War, several small private airlines were formed in Malta. Amongst these were The Instone Airlines 1946 (Malta) Ltd, BAS (Malta) Ltd, and Malta Airways. In 1947, the former two companies merged to form Air Malta Ltd together with Chartair Ltd (Until it received its license, its trade name was initially Maltair Merger). There was fierce competition with Malta Airways who were closely associated with BOAC and BEA. In 1951, Malta Airways absorbed the operations of Air Malta Ltd and together with BEA (34%), set up The Malta Airlines. BEA handled all the flight operations, engaging local cabin crew and ground staff, and this set up lasted until 1973. From the remnants of Air Malta Ltd, in 1955 a ground handling company was set up called Malta Aviation Services MAS , and their real estate, staff, and equipment transferred to this company. During this time, Col. R Strickland was Managing Director at Malta Aviation Services Ltd and Mr W H Woodroffe was Station Manager. On 1 February 1955, Emanuel Paris promoted as Senior Station Officer for MAS with offices at Luqa Airport.

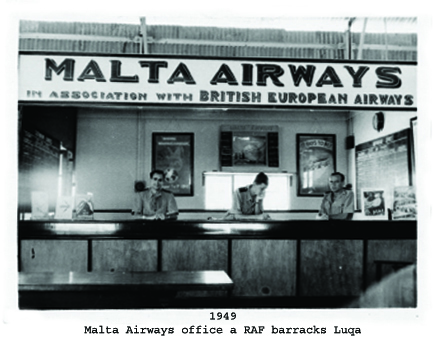
Malta Airways Office at RAF Barracks Luqa in 1949

In 1958, Mr J T Crossey was the Managing Director and Mr F G Haywood was Station Manager whilst Mr Emanuel Paris was appointed deputy Station Manager. On 30 September 1958, Mr E Paris replaced Mr F G Haywood as Station Manager of the airport, being the first Maltese national to take over this post.

In the early 1970s, the Maltese government formed a new locally majority owned airline, and initially under the chairmanship of John Mizzi, and later Albert Mizzi, a call for an international airline partner to help set up an airline was made. Pakistan's flag carrier PIA was selected for this purpose.

The name chosen for the new airline was similar to that of its forerunner, Air Malta Co Ltd, and was established on 31 March 1973. BEA was contracted to continue its previous Malta operations, this time for Air Malta instead of Malta Airlines, until Air Malta's first flight with its own equipment on 1 April 1974. The government took over both Malta Airlines and Malta Aviation Services and the local private owners were given a shareholding in Air Malta Co. Ltd. The option to buy out PIA's shareholding was exercised in 1979.

Air Malta started operations, with two wet leased Boeing 720Bs from Pakistan International Airlines that served Rome, Tripoli, London, Manchester, Frankfurt, Dublin for holiday charters, as well as Paris from Malta. In 1978 it bought three more Boeing 720Bs and in 1979 it bought the original two.

In 1980, three Boeing 737-200s were wet-leased, which were so successful that in 1983, three new fully-owned Boeing 737-200s were delivered. In 1986, Air Malta bought three new Boeing 737-200s, and in 1987 ordered its first Airbus A320. In 1989, Air Malta exercised an option for one more A320, and in 1992, three more Boeing 737-300s, and four Avro RJ70s were ordered initially for routes to Catania and Palermo, and to new destinations such as Tunis and Monastir, but then expanded to lean destinations further away with greater frequency, or completely new ones such as Beirut and Damascus.

Between 1994 and 1996, Air Malta operated wide body A310 aircraft to spur its Dubai service. In the summer of 1996 it also operated an L1011 Tristar on behalf of a German tour operator.

After the opening of Malta International Airport in 1992, Air Malta created CargoSystems, which included the transportation of cargo on Air Malta planes. In 1994, Air Malta inaugurated a cargo centre at the old airport terminal.

Between 1995 and 1997 Air Malta entered a codeshare with Balkan, to operate non-stop direct services Malta between New York JFK using Boeing 767-200ER equipment once weekly although at peak times, two weekly flights were operated.

=== 21st century developments ===
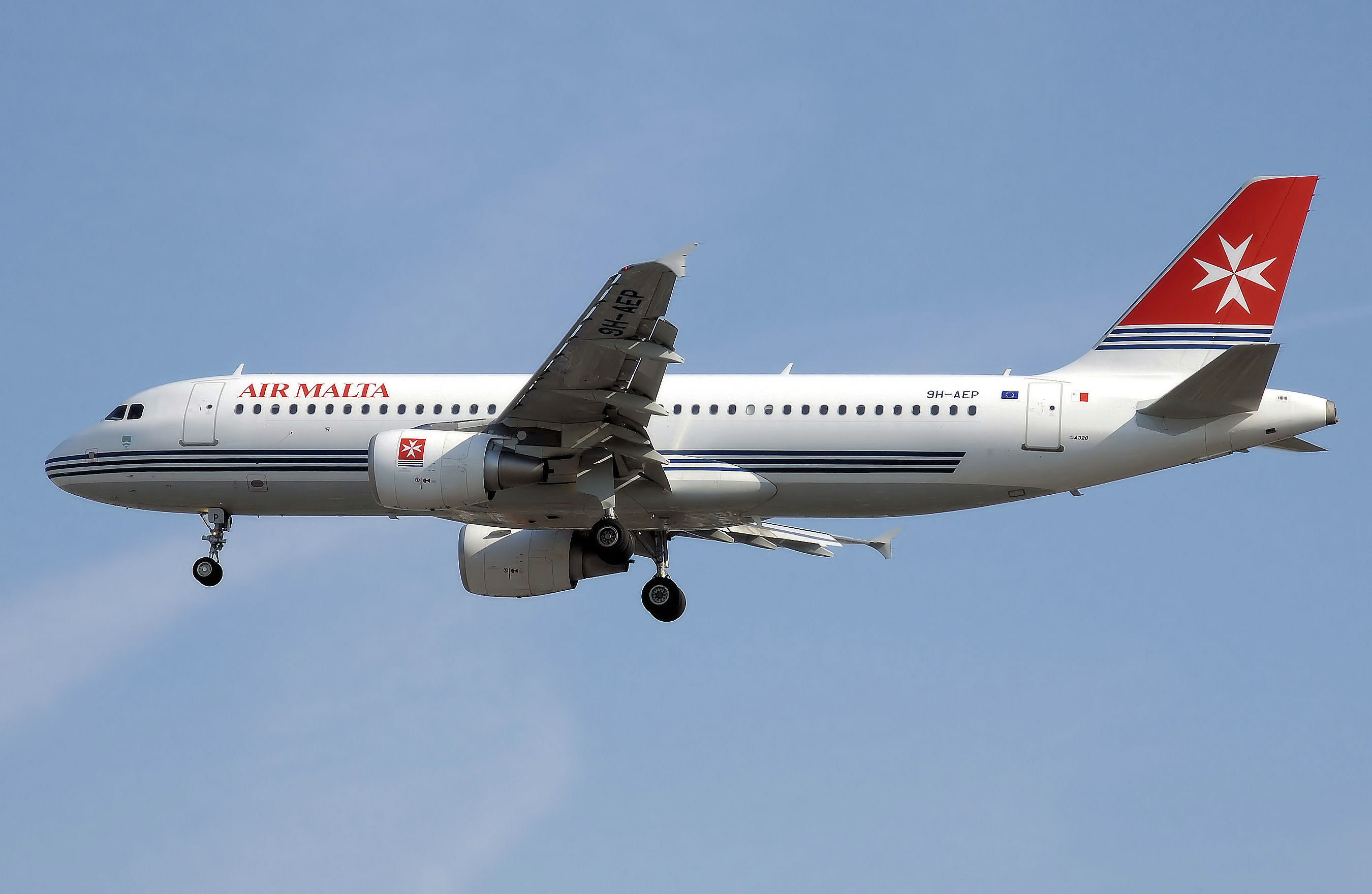
Air Malta Airbus A320-200 wearing the former livery in 2007

After a successful codeshare with Balkan to New York, in 2000 Air Malta took the plunge and decided to operate the route on its own. In March 2000 it announce thatbetreen 22 June and 4th September 2000, a series of 22 twice weekly flights will be operated. A Boeing 757-200ER was triples from American Trans Air, which however needed a fuel stop in Shannon. 5th freedom rights were secured, and the Maltese airline was allowed to pick up US bound passengers in Shannon, and vice versa. It was during this time that a codesharing agreement with Trans World Airlines for flights between Malta and USA via Milan and London Gatwick, began.

Between 2002 and 2007, Air Malta embarked upon a fleet replacement programme, opting to change all aircraft to Airbus A319s and A320s. The last aircraft in this order, an A320, was delivered on 22 March 2007.

Air Malta had around 190 interline ticketing agreements with other IATA airlines. According to the Association of European Airlines quarterly review of May 2006, Air Malta was the airline that lost the least amount of passenger baggage. The amount of baggage lost in the first quarter of 2006 was 4.1 bags massing per 1000 passengers.

In winter, the airline often leases out aircraft to maximize earnings during the low season. In September 2007, for instance, Air Malta made two agreements with Abu Dhabi-based Etihad Airways by which Air Malta wet-leased 2 Airbus aircraft to Etihad Airways for the winter period starting 1 September 2007, and provided operational support on another Airbus A320 aircraft leased by Etihad Airways. Air Malta helps Etihad set up its first narrow-body fleet. In January and February 2009, Air Malta wet-leased an A320 to Sky Airline of Chile. From 2011 to 2014, Air Malta wet-leased another A320 to Sky Airline during southern summer.

In 2012, Air Malta underwent a re-branding process, which caused some controversy as the titles on aircraft and signage only say Malta, omitting the word Air. The airline insisted this was not a name change, and the full name of the airline remains Air Malta. Additionally, the titles on the engines still say airmalta.com. The first plane to show off the new colours was the Airbus A320-200 9H-AEN at the Malta International Airshow 2012. On the second and last day of the show the A320 and a Spitfire performed a flypast as the closing act.

As a commemoration of the airline's 40 years of operation, the airline painted one of its aircraft, 9H-AEI, an A320-200, in retro colours, depicting the livery used on the Boeing 720Bs. The 9H-AEI aircraft debuted on 16 April 2014.

In June 2017, the newly appointed Minister for Tourism announced the restructuring of Air Malta. This was also confirmed by the newly appointed chairman. Air Malta then opened a number of new routes, including Tunis, Malaga (reduced to seasonal in 2019), Comiso (terminated after summer 2018), Kyiv, Lisbon, Casablanca, Southend (terminated in 2019) and Cagliari (subsequently reduced to June–September only). Manchester and Frankfurt were restarted after being briefly terminated.

In June 2018, Air Malta took delivery of its first Airbus A320neo from Beijing Capital Airlines, registered as 9H-NEO. Five more A320neo aircraft were delivered until the airline's closure in 2024, replacing all but one of its ageing A320s and A319s. The last two A320neo aircraft were delivered in 2023 and wore a new, simplified livery, which was intended to cut costs.

In March 2019, the airline announced that it had made a profit of €1.2 million in the fiscal year of 2018. This profit was the first the airline has made in 18 years.

=== Closure and replacement ===
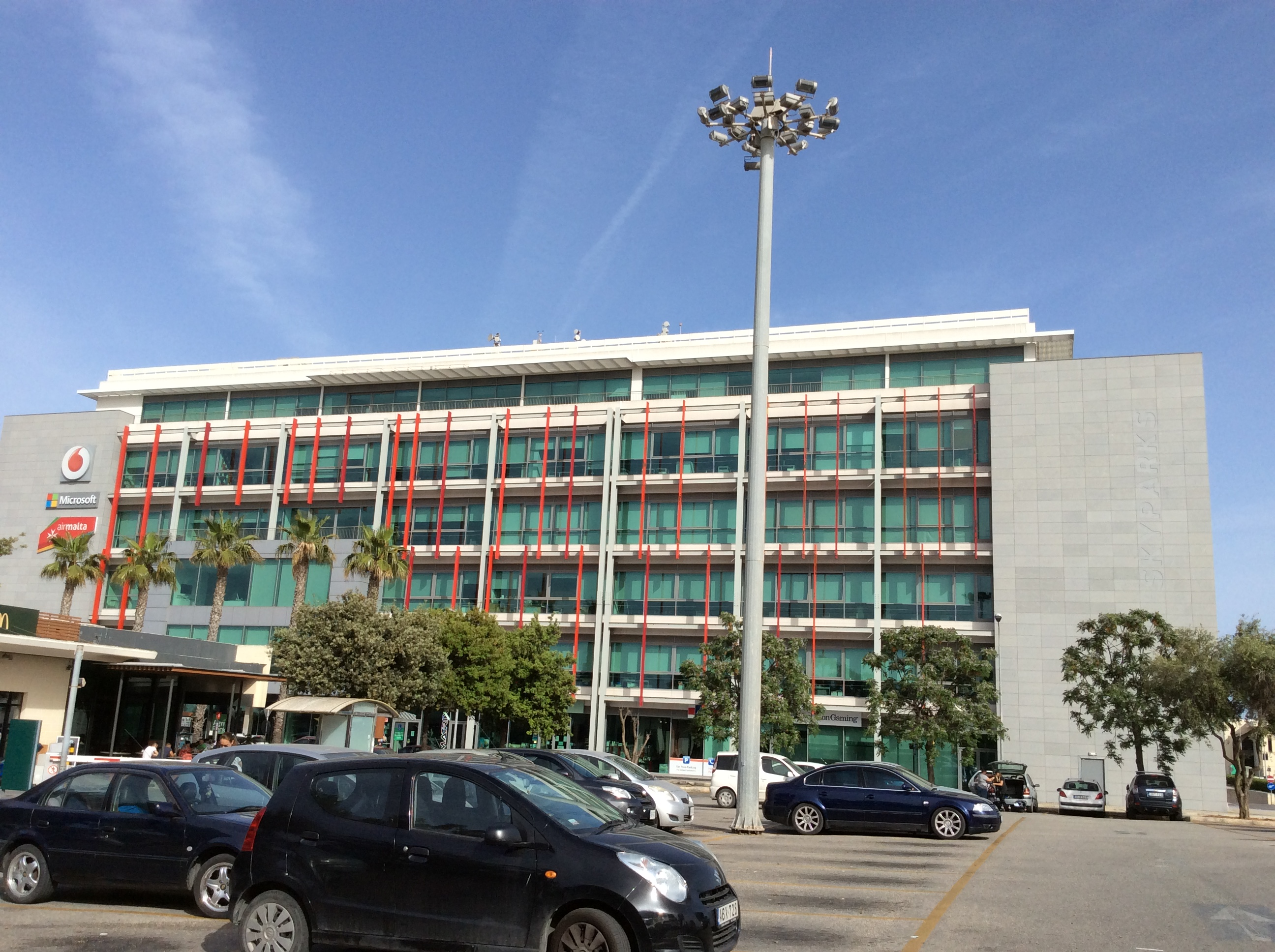
Sky Parks Business Center, the head office of Air Malta

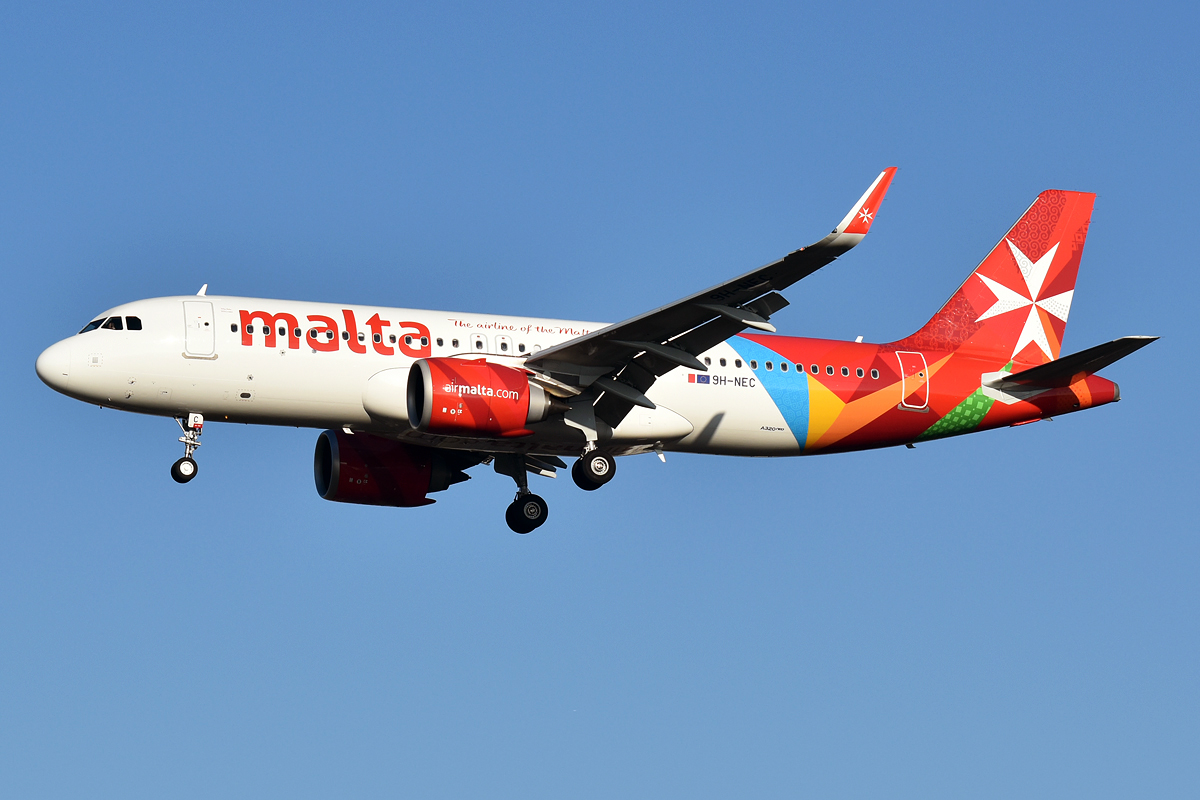
A former Air Malta Airbus A320neo, which subsequently has been taken over by its successor, KM Malta Airlines.

In August 2022, the Maltese government announced it would dissolve Air Malta should the European Union deny further financial state aid to the airline. It would then relocate its assets to a succeeding carrier. Shortly after, the decision regarding the airline's future had been delayed to the end of 2022; however, the route network and frequencies saw extensive cuts by October 2022, including the termination of several destinations.

On 18 April 2023, Chairman David Curmi announced that the European Commission declined to give permission to the Maltese government to inject 290 million euros of state aid into the airline. In 2023, Air Malta incorporated its aircraft with a new livery with red and dark red on the back of the plane. This livery would be subsequently used by the new airline. Also, a competitive process was to be launched for the new airline to acquire the tender for the Air Malta branding which is owned by a government owned company, IP Holdings, which was set up by former minister Konrad Mizzi to transfer assets to show that the company earned a profit in 2018.

On 2 October 2023, the Maltese government announced the closure of Air Malta for 30 March 2024. It was replaced by KM Malta Airlines the following day.

== Corporate affairs ==
The head office of the company was at the Skyparks Business Centre, located on the property of Malta International Airport in Luqa. In the 1960s and 1970s, the head office of its predecessor Malta Airlines was in Sliema.

== Codeshare agreements ==
Air Malta maintained Codeshare agreements with the following airlines:

- Aeroflot
- airBaltic
- Air France
- Air Serbia
- Austrian Airlines
- Brussels Airlines
- Czech Airlines
- Emirates
- Etihad Airways
- ITA Airways
- KLM
- Lufthansa
- Qatar Airways
- Swiss International Air Lines
- Turkish Airlines

== Fleet ==
=== Final fleet ===
As of March 2024 and prior to the closure of operations, Air Malta operated the following Airbus A320 family aircraft:

Air Malta fleet
Aircraft	Number	Orders	Passengers			Notes
Aircraft	Number	Orders	J	Y	Total	Notes
Airbus A320-200	1	—	12	150	162	All transferred to KM Malta Airlines.
Airbus A320neo	6	—	12	162	174	All transferred to KM Malta Airlines.
Total	7	—				

=== Former fleet ===
Air Malta previously also operated the following aircraft types:

Air Malta former fleet
Aircraft	Total	Introduced	Retired	Notes
Airbus A310-300	2	1994	1996	Leased from Lufthansa and Sabena.
Airbus A319-100	7	2001	2019	
Avro RJ70	4	1994	1998	
BAC One-Eleven 500	1	1975	1975	Leased from British Caledonian.
Boeing 720B	7	1978	1989	
Boeing 727-200	Unknown	Unknown	Unknown	One leased to Faucett Perú.
Boeing 737-200	9	1980	2004	
Boeing 737-300	12	1993	2008	
Boeing 737-400	4	1998	2000	
Boeing 737-500	1	2001	2001	Leased from Maersk Air.
Boeing 737-700	2	2000	2000	Leased from Maersk Air.
British Aerospace 146-200	1	1993	1993	Leased from British Aerospace.
British Aerospace ATP	1	1992	1993	Leased from SATA Air Açores.
Convair 880	1	1977	1979	
McDonnell Douglas DC-9-32	1	1979	1980	Leased from Austrian Airlines.
McDonnell Douglas MD-90-30	1	2008	2008	Leased from Hello.

== Incidents and accidents ==
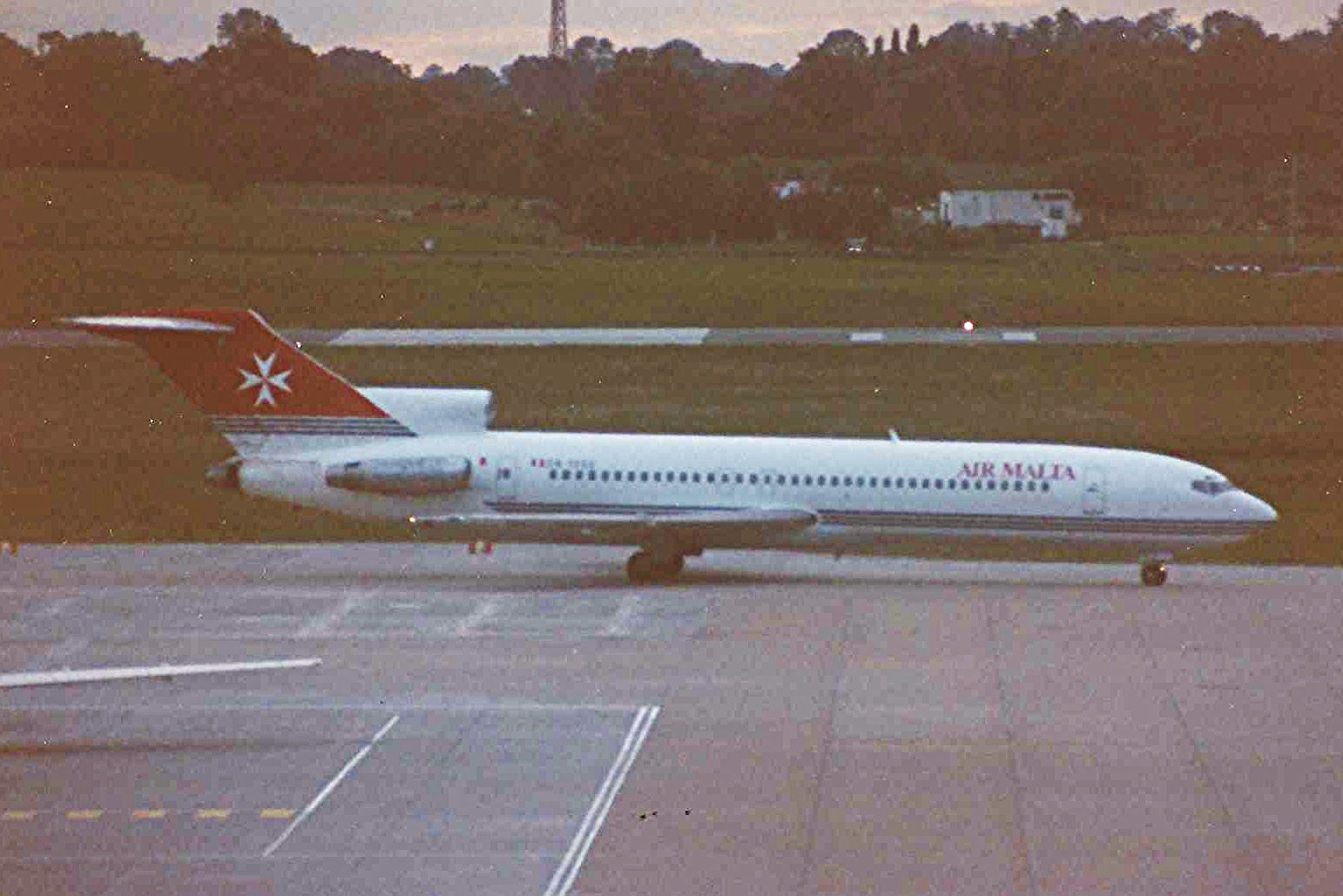
OB-1303, the Faucett Perú Boeing 727 which disappeared in the Atlantic Ocean on 11 September 1990, while on a transferral flight following the end of a lease to Air Malta

Air Malta had no fatal accidents throughout its five decades of operation. Incidents involving Air Malta aircraft include:

- On 31 October 1981, after a Boeing 737-200 landed in Cairo, Egypt, two bombs exploded, injuring four people. A third bomb that failed to detonate was found later.
- On 21 December 1988, Air Malta Flight 180 played an unintentional role when an unaccompanied baggage containing a timed explosive was checked onto the flight out of Luqa Airport to Frankfurt Airport, where it was loaded as interline baggage to the first leg of Pan Am Flight 103 from Frankfurt to London-Heathrow Airport. The bomb in the unaccompanied baggage then exploded on Pan Am 103's transatlantic leg while it was flying over Lockerbie, Scotland, killing a total of 270 people.
- On 9 June 1997, Air Malta Flight 830, a Boeing 737-200, was hijacked by two Turks on a flight from Malta to Istanbul, Turkey. They demanded the release of Mehmet Ali Ağca. The hijack ended in Cologne, Germany, with no casualties amongst the 74 passengers and 6 crew.
- On 19 January 2004, Air Malta Flight 642, an Airbus A320, hit a pylon at Malta International Airport while taxiing prior to takeoff. There were no injuries among the crew and 27 passengers on board, while damage to the aircraft's wing amounted to around $2 million.

In addition, on 11 September 1990 a Faucett Perú Boeing 727 which had been leased to Air Malta disappeared in the Atlantic Ocean while it was being ferried back to Peru from Malta upon the end of its lease, with 16 presumed fatalities.

== See also ==
- List of defunct airlines of Malta
