= Hermes Aviation =

Airline of Malta

IATA	ICAO	Call sign
H3	HME	HERGO
- Founded: 2014
- Commenced operations: 2014
- Ceased operations: 2015
- AOC #: M-19
- Operating bases: Malta International Airport
- Fleet size: 1
- Destinations: 4
- Headquarters: Luqa, Malta

Hermes Aviation, styled as flyhermes.com and known as Fly Hermes was a short-lived Maltese airline start-up, based at the Skypark Business Center, Malta International Airport in Luqa. Hermes Aviation provided scheduled and charter flights for passengers, cargo and mail.

== History ==
Hermes Aviation was founded in 2014, with its first aircraft delivered on 31 May 2014 from the Italian carrier Blue Panorama Airlines. During the summer 2014 peak season the aircraft was leased to Italian airline Mistral Air and based at Il Caravaggio International Airport in Bergamo, Italy, to operate charter service to leisure destinations in Greece and Spain.

The first scheduled services began on 15 December 2014, with routes from Turin to Malta via Comiso and Palermo. The service was halted in January 2015, following the revocation of the airline's AOC as a result of numerous delays and flight cancellations.

== Destinations ==
Country	City	Airport	Notes	Refs
Italy	Comiso	Comiso Airport		
Italy	Palermo	Falcone–Borsellino Airport		
Italy	Turin	Turin Airport		
Malta	Luqa	Malta International Airport	Hub	

== Fleet ==
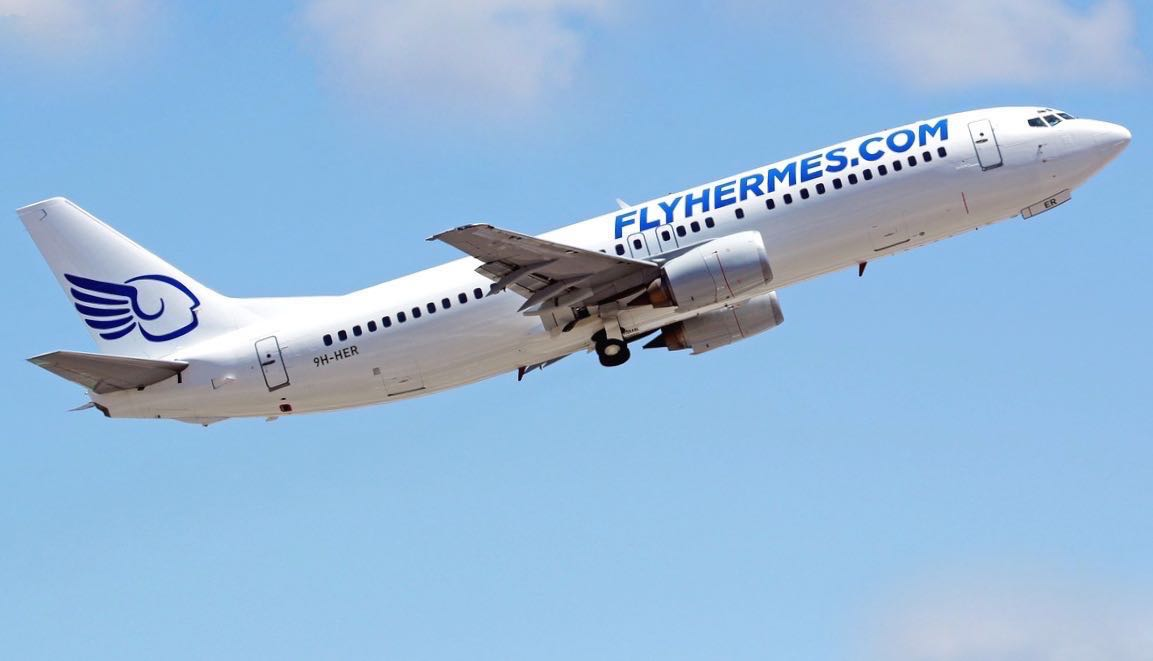
Hermes Aviation Boeing 737-400

As of November 2014, the Hermes Aviation fleet consisted of the following aircraft:

FlyHermes.com Fleet
Aircraft	In Service	Passengers
Boeing 737-400	1	164
Total	1	
