= European 2000 Airlines =

Airline based in Luqa, Malta

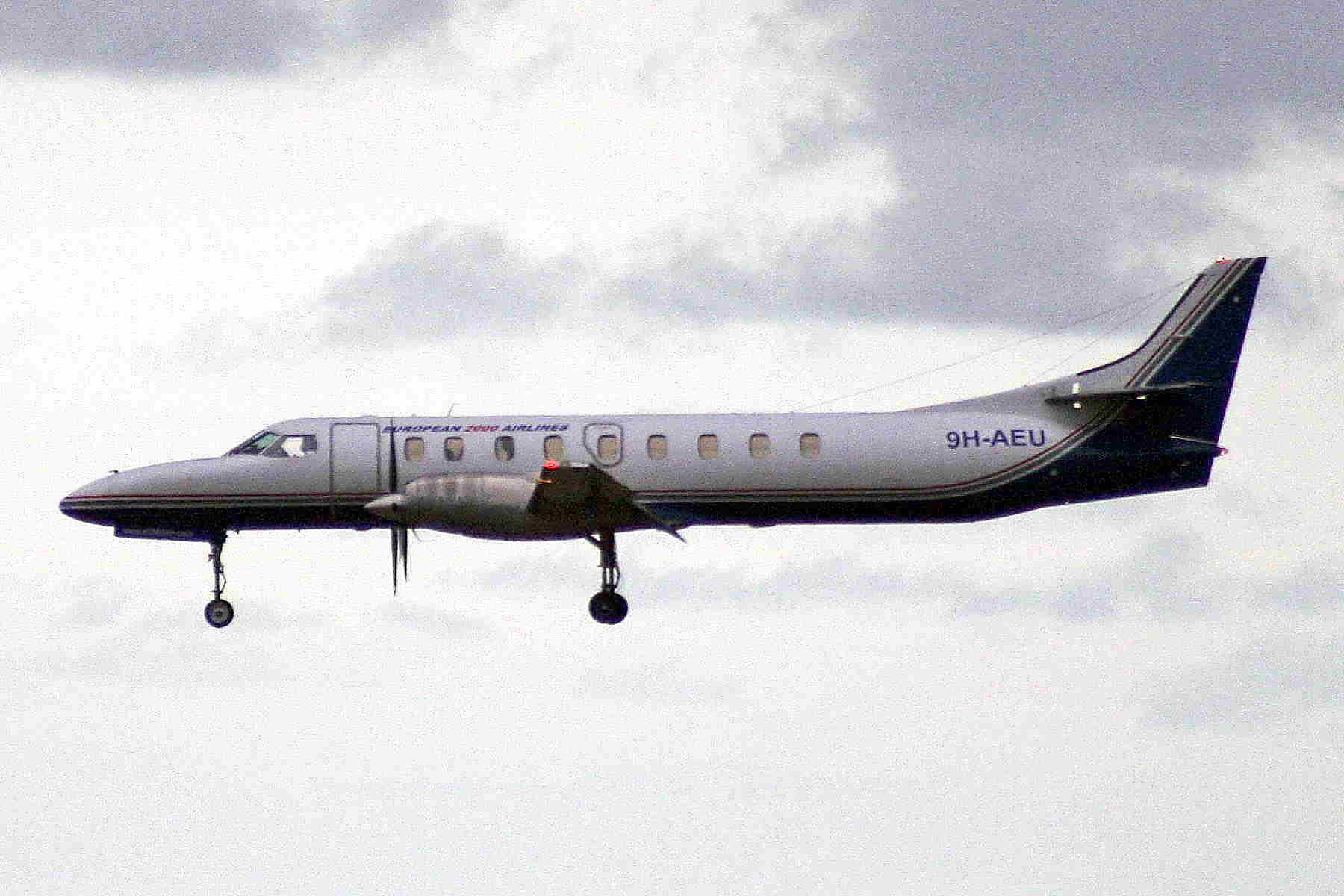
IATA	ICAO	Call sign
-	EUT	FIESTA
- Founded: 2005
- Ceased operations: 2013
- Hubs: Malta International Airport
- Fleet size: 2
- Parent company: European 2000 Airlines Limited
- Headquarters: Luqa, Malta
- Website: http://www.e2000air.com

European 2000 Airlines was an airline based in Luqa, Malta. It operated scheduled services between Malta and Sicily. Its main base was Malta International Airport, with hubs at Vincenzo Florio Airport, Trapani and Catania-Fontanarossa Airport.

== History ==
The airline started operations in September 2005. It was planning to launch scheduled services from Trapani to Malta and Tunis. Operations were reportedly ceased in 2013.

== Fleet ==
The European 2000 Airlines fleet included the following aircraft (at March 2007):

- 2 Fairchild Metro 23
