= Aircastle =

Aircraft leasing company

Aircastle Limited
- Type: Subsidiary
- Industry: Commercial Aircraft Sales and Leasing
- Founded: 2005; 21 years ago
- Headquarters: Stamford, Connecticut, United States
- Number of locations: 3
- Area served: Worldwide
- Key people: Michael Inglese (CEO); Aaron Dahlke (CFO)
- Services: Commercial Aircraft Leasing and Sales
- Revenue: ▲US$796 Million (FY 2017)
- Operating income: ▲US$400.7 Million(FY 2017)
- Net income: ▲US$147.9 Million (FY 2017)
- Total assets: ▲US$7.2 Billion (FY 2017)
- Total equity: ▲US$1.9 Billion (FY 2017)
- Number of employees: Approximately 100
- Parent: Marubeni and Mizuho Leasing
- Website: Aircastle.com

Aircastle Limited is an aircraft leasing company that acquires, leases and sells commercial jet aircraft to airlines around the world. It has its headquarters in Stamford, Connecticut, with offices in Dublin and Singapore. Aircastle was incorporated on October 29, 2004.

As of September 30, 2019, Aircastle owns and managed 277 aircraft leased to 87 lessees located in 48 countries.

From August 2006 to March 2020, Aircastle traded on the New York Stock Exchange under the ticker symbol AYR.

On November 6, 2019, Aircastle reached a merger agreement with Marubeni and Mizuho Leasing at a price of US$32 per share, for a company valuation of US$7.4 billion; Marubeni was previously Aircastle's largest shareholder. The acquisition was completed on March 27, 2020.
