= Universal Air =

Maltese airline

IATA	ICAO	Call sign
VO	UVL	UNIVERSALAIR
- AOC #: MT-39
- Operating bases: Malta International Airport
- Fleet size: 4
- Destinations: 8
- Headquarters: Luqa, Malta
- Employees: 110
- Website: flyuniversalair.com

Universal Air, legally incorporated as Universal Air Charter and Management Limited, is a Maltese airline headquartered at Malta International Airport in Luqa.

== History ==
The company was founded at 15 April 2015 as Air CM Global Limited and rebranded in September 2022 as Universal Air. It operates using an air operator's certificate issued by the Maltese Civil Aviation Directorate.

Universal Air subsequently announced it would start scheduled flights to metropolitan and leisure destinations from both their home base in Luqa and Pécs in Hungary. Its scheduled inaugural flights took place on 26 March 2024 between Malta and Pecs.

In May 2025, Universal Air announced it would terminate all scheduled operations by 30 May 2025 and will focus solely on charter flights and ACMI services.

== Destinations ==
As of April 2024, Universal Air operates scheduled flights to the following destinations:

=== Africa ===
Libya

- Tripoli - Mitiga International Airport

Morocco

- Casablanca - Mohammed V International Airport

=== Asia ===
Cyprus

- Larnaca - Larnaca International Airport Terminated
- Paphos - Paphos International Airport Terminated

Israel

- Haifa - Uri Michaeli Haifa International Airport Terminated

=== Europe ===
Czech Republic

- Prague - Václav Havel Airport Prague

France

- Nice - Nice Côte d'Azur Airport

Germany

- Munich - Munich Airport

Greece

- Corfu - Corfu International Airport

Hungary

- Debrecen - Debrecen International Airport
- Pécs - Pécs-Pogány International Airport Terminated

Italy

- Palermo - Palermo Airport

Malta

- Luqa - Malta International Airport base

Spain

- Ibiza - Ibiza Airport

== Fleet ==
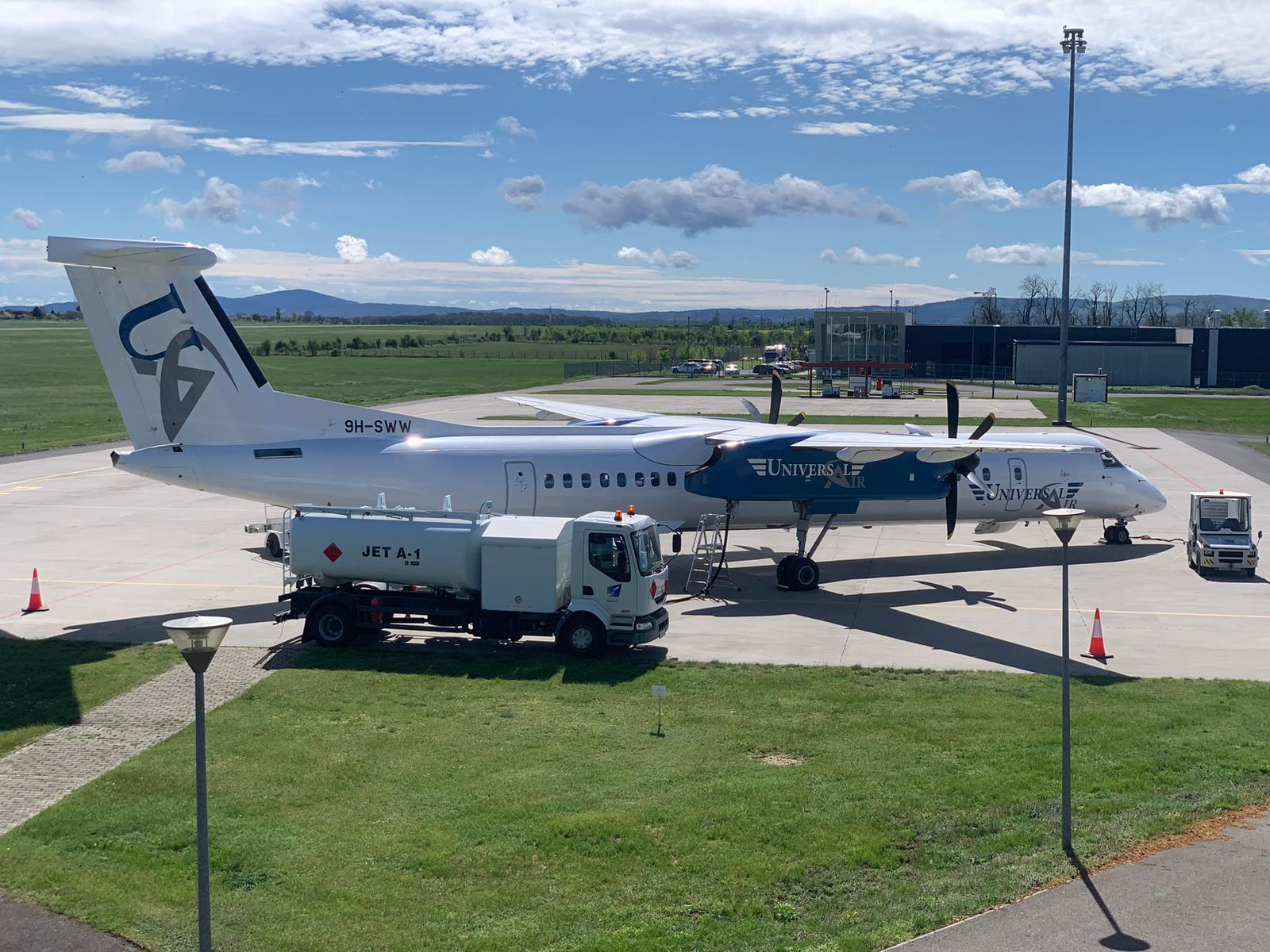
Universal Air De Havilland Canada DHC-8-400 in Pécs.

=== Current fleet ===
As of July 2026, Universal Air operates the following aircraft:

Aircraft	In service	Orders	Notes
De Havilland Canada DHC-8-100	1	—	Stored
De Havilland Canada DHC-8-Q400	3	2	
Total	4	2	

=== Former fleet ===
As of August 2025, Universal Air operated 1 De Havilland Canada DHC-8-100 and 3 De Havilland Canada DHC-8-400.
