= List of monuments in Luqa =

This is a list of monuments in Luqa, Malta, which are listed on the National Inventory of the Cultural Property of the Maltese Islands.

== List ==
Name of object	Location	Coordinates	ID	Photo	Upload
Chapel of St. James	Triq Ħal Luqa / Triq Garibaldi	35°51′45″N 14°29′51″E	1980	Chapel of St. James	Upload Photo
Niche of the Madonna of Mount Carmel	17 Triq Pawlu Magri	35°51′33″N 14°29′18″E	1981	Niche of the Madonna of Mount Carmel	Upload Photo
Niche of St Joseph	Triq Pawlu Magri		1982	Niche of St Joseph	Upload Photo
Parish Church of St. Andrew	Misraħ Sant' Andrija	35°51′37″N 14°29′20″E	1983	Parish Church of St. Andrew	Upload Photo
Niche of St Paul	Sqaq Sant' Andrija No 2	35°51′34″N 14°29′21″E	01984	Niche of St Paul	Upload Photo
Dejma Cross	Misraħ tal-Knisja	35°51′36″N 14°29′21″E	1985	Dejma Cross	Upload Photo
Statue of the Immaculate Conception	Misraħ tal-Knisja	35°51′37″N 14°29′21″E	1986	Statue of the Immaculate Conception	Upload Photo
Niche of St Joseph	Misraħ tal-Knisja / Triq San Ġuzepp	35°51′36″N 14°29′22″E	1987	Niche of St Joseph	Upload Photo
Niche of St. Andrew	"Palazz Bethsaida", Misraħ tal-Knisja	35°51′37″N 14°29′22″E	1988	Niche of St. Andrew	Upload Photo
Niche of St Michael	10 Triq San Ġuzepp	35°51′36″N 14°29′23″E	1989	Niche of St Michael	Upload Photo
Niche of St George	37 Triq Santa Marija	35°51′34″N 14°29′27″E	1990	Niche of St George	Upload Photo
Niche of the Sacred Heart of Jesus	3-5 Triq San Ġorġ	35°51′34″N 14°29′27″E	1991	Niche of the Sacred Heart of Jesus	Upload Photo
Niche of St. Andrew	Triq San Ġuzepp		1992	Niche of St. Andrew	Upload Photo
Niche of the Madonna of Mount Carmel	Triq San Ġuzepp / Triq il-Gdida	35°51′35″N 14°29′31″E	1993	Niche of the Madonna of Mount Carmel	Upload Photo
Niche of the Madonna of Lourdes	"Lourdes", 101 Triq il-Gdida	35°51′31″N 14°29′28″E	1994	Niche of the Madonna of Lourdes	Upload Photo
Chapel of St. Mary	Triq il-Karmnu	35°51′38″N 14°29′16″E	1995	Chapel of St. Mary	Upload Photo
Niche of St. Andrew	Triq il-Karmnu / Sqaq tal-Karmnu Nru 4	35°51′38″N 14°29′11″E	1996	Niche of St. Andrew	Upload Photo
Statue of St. Thomas	Triq San Tumas / Triq Indri Micallef	35°51′35″N 14°29′04″E	1997	Statue of St. Thomas	Upload Photo
Niche of St Roque	46 Sqaq tal-Karmnu Nru 4	35°51′41″N 14°29′10″E	1998	Niche of St Roque	Upload Photo
Niche of St Joseph	46 Triq ir-Rix Tellu	35°51′41″N 14°29′19″E	1999	Niche of St Joseph	Upload Photo
Chapel of the Madonna of Mount Carmel	Triq il-Gdida / Triq id-Dokkiena	35°51′40″N 14°29′26″E	2000	Chapel of the Madonna of Mount Carmel	Upload Photo
Niche of St Roque	25-27 Triq San Pawl	35°51′45″N 14°29′21″E	2001	Niche of St Roque	Upload Photo
Niche of the Transfiguration of Christ	Triq Valletta	35°52′01″N 14°29′26″E	2002	Niche of the Transfiguration of Christ	Upload Photo
Chapel of Our Lady of Victory	Triq ir-Russett Abjad, Ħal-Farruġ	35°51′54″N 14°28′44″E	2003	Chapel of Our Lady of Victory	Upload Photo
