= Unione Philharmonic Society =

Maltese musical band

L'Unione Philharmonic Society - Luqa Malta

Background information
- Also known as: Banda Unjoni, Banda ta l-ajkla, The first band in Luqa
- Origin: Luqa, Malta
- Genres: Classical Music
- Occupation: Concert Band
- Years active: 1880-present
- Members: Honorary President; Abela Scolaro; Current President; Joseph Piscopo; Secretary; James Ciappara; Principal Conductor; John David Zammit
- Past members: Founder; Vincenzo Camilleri

The L'Unione Philharmonic Society (Banda Unjoni), based in Luqa, Malta, is one of the major bands in Malta. It is the first musical society in Luqa, founded in 1880.

== History ==
=== Early years ===
In 1880 Mro. Vincezo Camilleri founded the l'Unione Philharmonic Society known as L-Banda Unjoni. Mro. Camilleri lived in the village of Luqa and he was a musician by profession. He was married to a Luqa girl named Maria Grazzja née Fava and had five children. On Mro. Camilleri's own initiative he gathered a number of youths in Luqa and started to teach them music and how to play an instrument. This was the birth of the first musical organisation in Luqa. It was in this year that Mro. Vincenzo Camilleri composed the first musical piece called Marcia L'Unione 1880.

In 1883 when Mro. Vincenzo Camilleri was satisfied that the young guys he taught music were ready to go public, he retired and left the direction of the band in the hands of his son Mro. Gavino Camilleri. From there onwards, the society grew and became strong establishing itself as one of the best philharmonic societies in Malta. In 1930, the society celebrated its 50 years since its foundation.

=== War and post-war years ===
Unfortunately during World War II the activities of the band were suspended. Malta was heavily bombarded by Axis forces during the war, and the village of Luqa was targeted due to its proximity to RAF Luqa, one of Malta's main airfields. The premises of L'Unione Philharmonic Society were destroyed by aerial bombardment, resulting in the loss of many riches, including historic documents and music scores.

After the war life at the village of Luqa slowly returned to normal and the society began its activities again. The band got up on its feet again and it quickly re-established itself in the Maltese musical arena. The society also was growing in the manufacturing of pyrotechnics and it was gaining a good reputation in the pyrotechnic art.

The St. Andrews Fireworks Factory was established as part of the L'Unione Philharmonic Society and the factory had very able men who were highly talented in the art of fireworks.

In 1980 the society celebrated its 100 years of existence. A number of celebrations were carried out to mark this important event. It was also the year when the current conductor took the baton for the band.

=== 1997 - The year the Society went international ===
It was November 1997 when the band left the island of Malta to go to Amalfi in Italy to perform. This was the first time the l'Unione Philharmonic Society performed outside Malta. The society took active part in the celebrations of the feast of St. Andrew. The feast of St. Andrew is solemnly celebrated in Amalfi.

The band played at the start of the procession, during the procession and at the end. The interesting part of the event was the merry band march executed in streets of Amalfi at the early hours of the morning to announce to the people that it was the feast of St. Andrew. The band also performed a musical concert in the evening at a church in Amalfi.

On the same journey the band attended an audience with the pope, the late John Paul the Second and played inside sala Nervi for the pope. The pope was so delighted that he invited the band near him on the stage. The band also played in Piazza San Pietro at the Vatican.

=== Present day ===
In 2005 the Society celebrated its 125 years of existence and for the occasion there were a number of celebrations. The Society publicized a book on its history through the years. This was published in Maltese and its title was Hal Luqa u L-Banda taghha L-Unjoni. The author is Francis Galea, a renowned Maltese writer and history researcher.

In 2007 and 2014 the St. Andrew Fireworks Factory won the Maltese Ground Fireworks competition. In 2014 the St. Andrew Fireworks Factory also won the National (aerial) Fireworks Festival making it a double win in just a few days and adding more honours to the Society.

This day the Society has around 50 of its own musicians, reared and thought by the music teachers of the society. Around 12 of those 50 have an age range between 12 years and 16 years. There is also a good number of students learning to play to eventually join the society in the near future.

Recently the Maltese Archbishop Emeritus, His Excellency Paul Cremona, paid a visit to our society. It was a memorable event where His Excellency was impressed how much the society developed in its 126 years of existence. The Archbishop's great grandfather, Vincenzo Cremona, was one of the earliest presidents. To mark this event a bust of Vincenzo Cremona was unveiled by the Archbishop and his father in the presence of the Archbishop's family and the members of the society.

In 2017 the Union Philharmonic Society, produced a marvelous concert at the President's Palace in San Anton. In the closing speech, President Marie Louise Coleiro Preca stated that the Union Philharmonic Society, "makes an honour not only to the village of Luqa but also the Maltese Islands."

== Society's Presidents ==
- Vincenzo Camilleri (Founder) (1880–1883)
- Nikola Sammut (1883–1899)
- Vincenzo Cremona (1899–1900)
- Nikola Sammut (1900–1923)
- Joseph Azzopardi (1923–1942)
- Joe Azzopardi (1942–1947)
- James Ciappara (1947–1949)
- John Azzopardi (1949–1953)
- Joseph Mary Azzopardi (1953–1957)
- Noe' Spiteri (1957–1960)
- Carmel Spiteri (1960–1965)
- George Borg (1965–1971)
- Saviour Schembri (1971–1989)
- Innocent Camilleri (1989–1993)
- Salvu Spiteri (1993–2001)
- Noel Camilleri (2001–2014)
- Joseph Piscopo (2014–Present)

== Principal Conductors ==
- Vincenzo Camilleri (1880–1883)
- Gavino Camilleri (1883–1889)
- Geatano Grech (1889–1904)
- Orlando Crescimanno (1904–1912)
- Emanuel Spiteri (1913–1920)
- Vincenzo Costa (1920–1921)
- Salvatore Mallia (1921–1937)
- Joseph Casapinta (1937–1938)
- Charles Xuereb (1938–1945)
- Joseph Ablea Scolaro (1945–1979)
- Charles Zammit (1979–2010)
- John David Zammit (2010–present)
