= CAE Aviation =

Luxembourg aviation company

- Type: Private limited company
- Industry: Aerial work, equipment maintenance
- Founded: 1971; 55 years ago
- Headquarters: Luxembourg Airport, Luxembourg
- Key people: Zeler Julie (Managing Director)
- Services: Aerial surveillance, military parachuting, airborne geophysics, maintenance
- Revenue: €42,500,000 (2015)
- Website: www.cae-aviation.com

CAE Aviation is an aviation company based in Luxembourg providing services such as aerial surveillance, reconnaissance, parachuting and maintenance to various international governmental agencies and private operators.

== History ==
Founded in 1971, CAE Aviation initially specialised in aircraft maintenance. Since the 1980s the company has diversified into aerial surveillance and reconnaissance.

== Services ==
With a fleet comprising six different types of turboprop aircraft – mainly of the Beechcraft King Air and Fairchild Metro families – CAE Aviation provides aerial surveillance, military parachuting and airborne geophysics services. The company also runs a service centre for Wescam airborne cameras in Lapalisse, France.

== Fleet ==
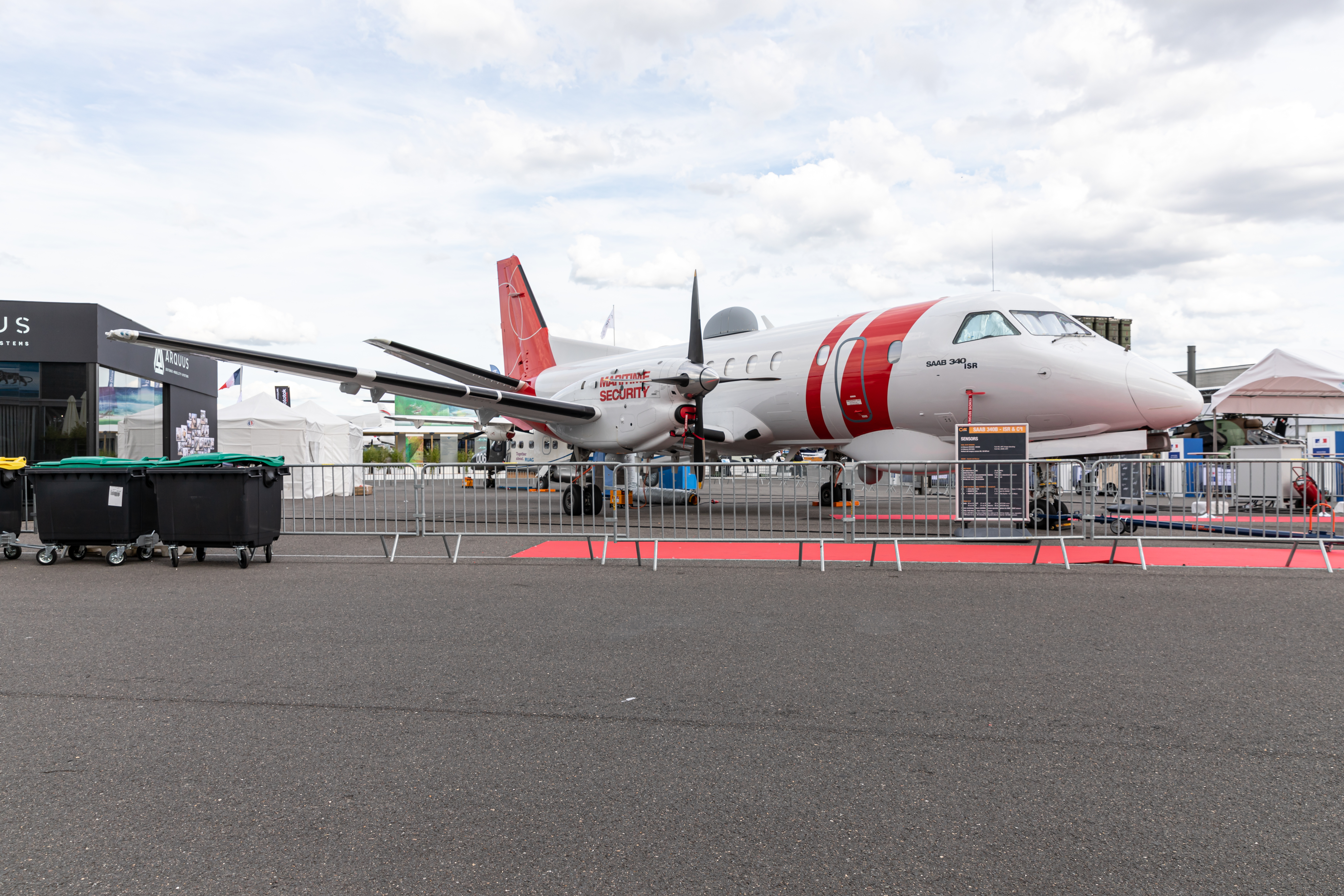
Saab 340B ISR aircraft of CAE Aviation, Paris Air Show 2019

=== Current fleet ===
As of July 2026, CAE Aviation operates the following aircraft:

Aircraft	In service	Orders	Notes
Saab 340B(AEW)	1	—	
Total	1	—	

=== Former fleet ===
As of August 2025, CAE Aviation operated 1 Saab 340B(AEW).

== Accidents ==
- 24 October 2016: a Fairchild Merlin twin turboprop crashed shortly after take-off from Malta International Airport. All five people on board were killed. The aircraft was taking part in a French-led surveillance operation to counter people smuggling in the Mediterranean.
