= Malta International Airshow =

Air show in Malta

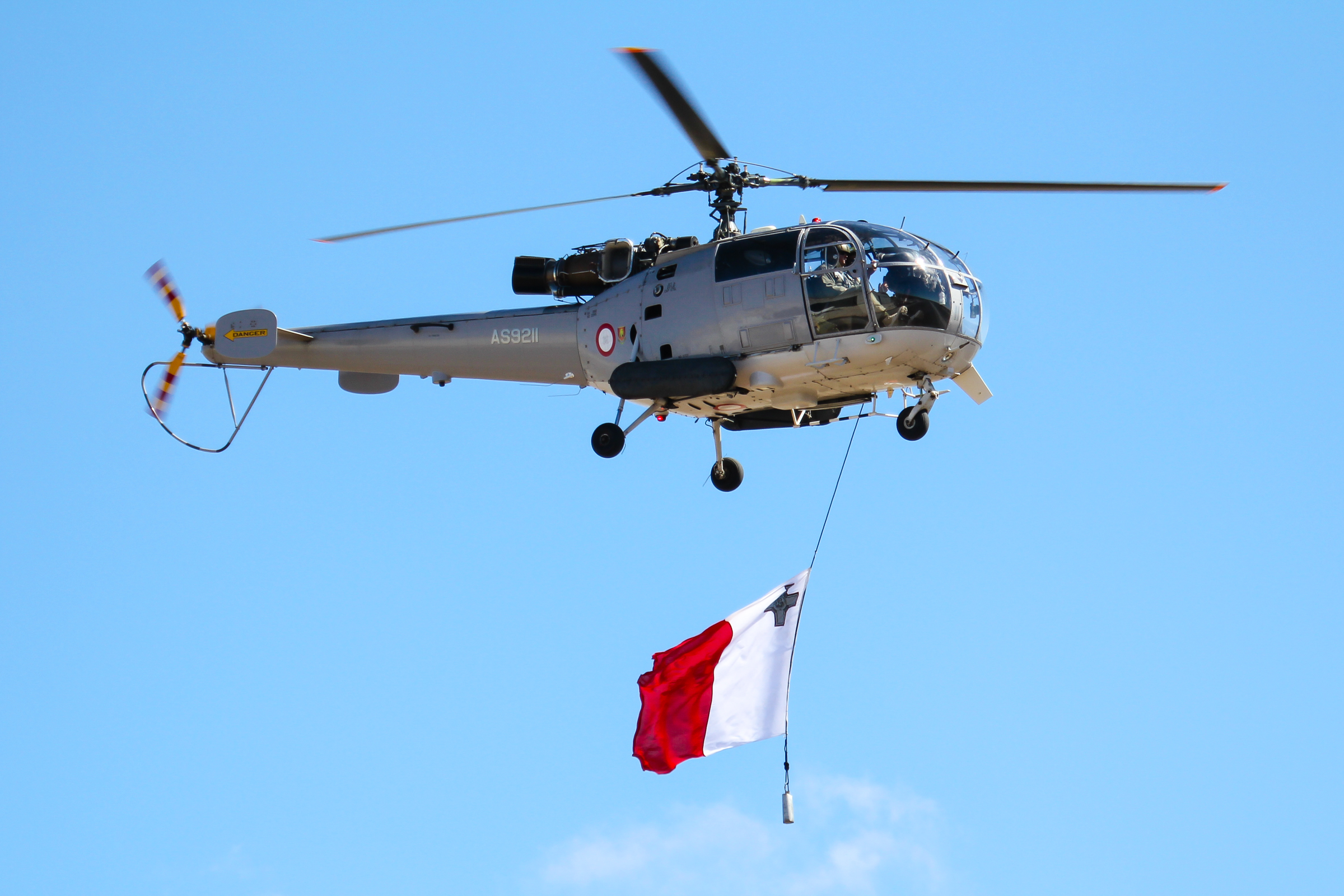
- Armed Forces of Malta Alouette III at the 2015 airshow
- Status: Active
- Genre: Air show
- Date: late September
- Frequency: Annually
- Venue: Malta International Airport
- Coordinates: 35.854431°N 14.467068°E
- Country: Malta
- Established: September 1993
- Organizer: Malta Aviation Society
- Website: www.maltairshow.com

The Malta International Airshow is an annual air show held at the Malta International Airport organized by the Malta Aviation Society. It was first held in September 1993 over Marsamxett Harbour, but then moved to Malta International Airport with the exception of the years 2007 and 2009. During these years, the event was held at St. Paul's Bay due to the construction of new hangars at the airport, where cranes would have been a hazard for the low flying aircraft.

Active years 1993 to 2021; however 2018 and 2019 did not take place due to lack of funds, and 2020 was skipped due to COVID-19. It was returned shortly after in 2021 and was cancelled in 2022 and 2024. The airshow happened again in 2023. As of 2025, the airshow is held every two years

== Gallery ==
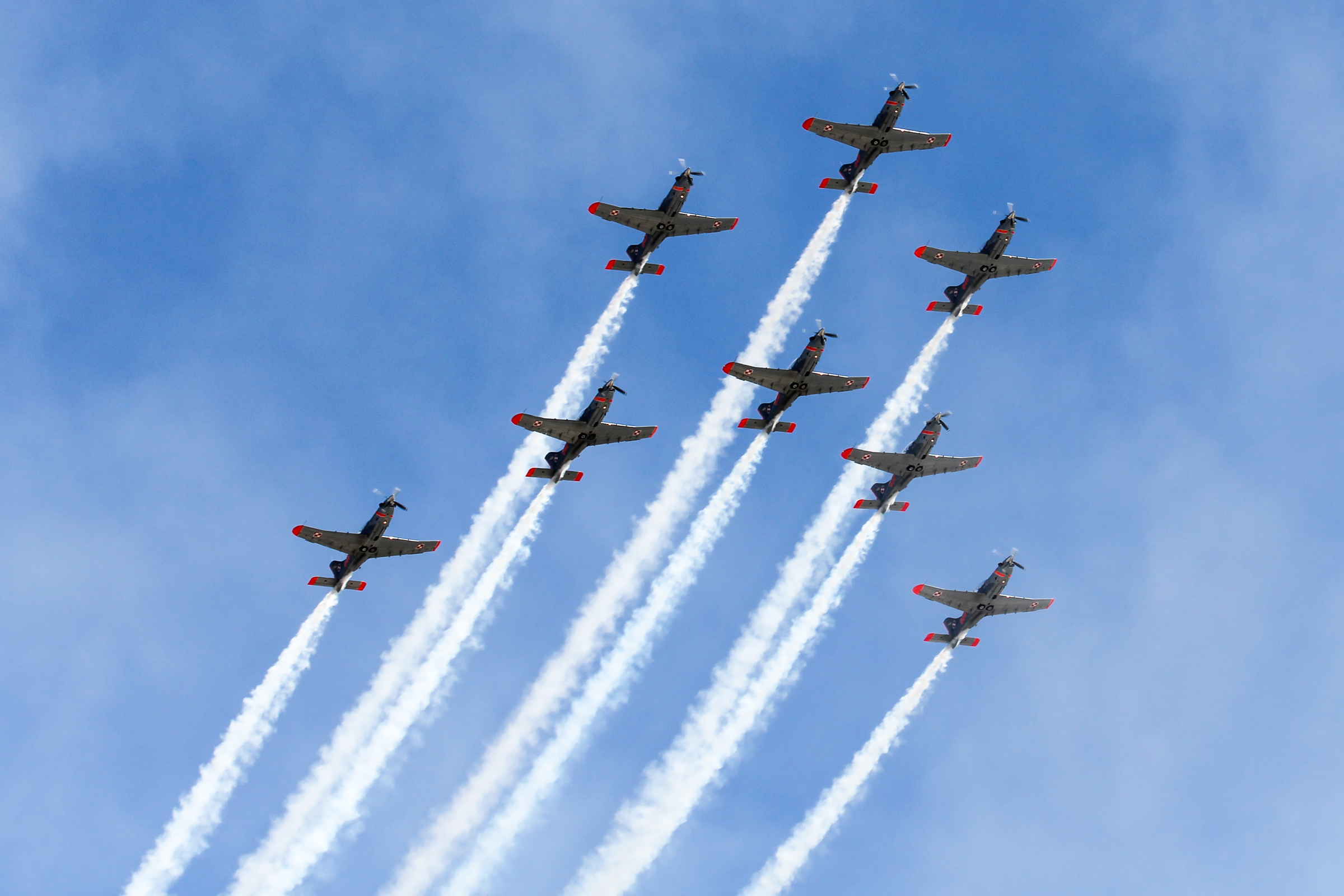
Orlik Aerobatic Team at the 2015 airshow

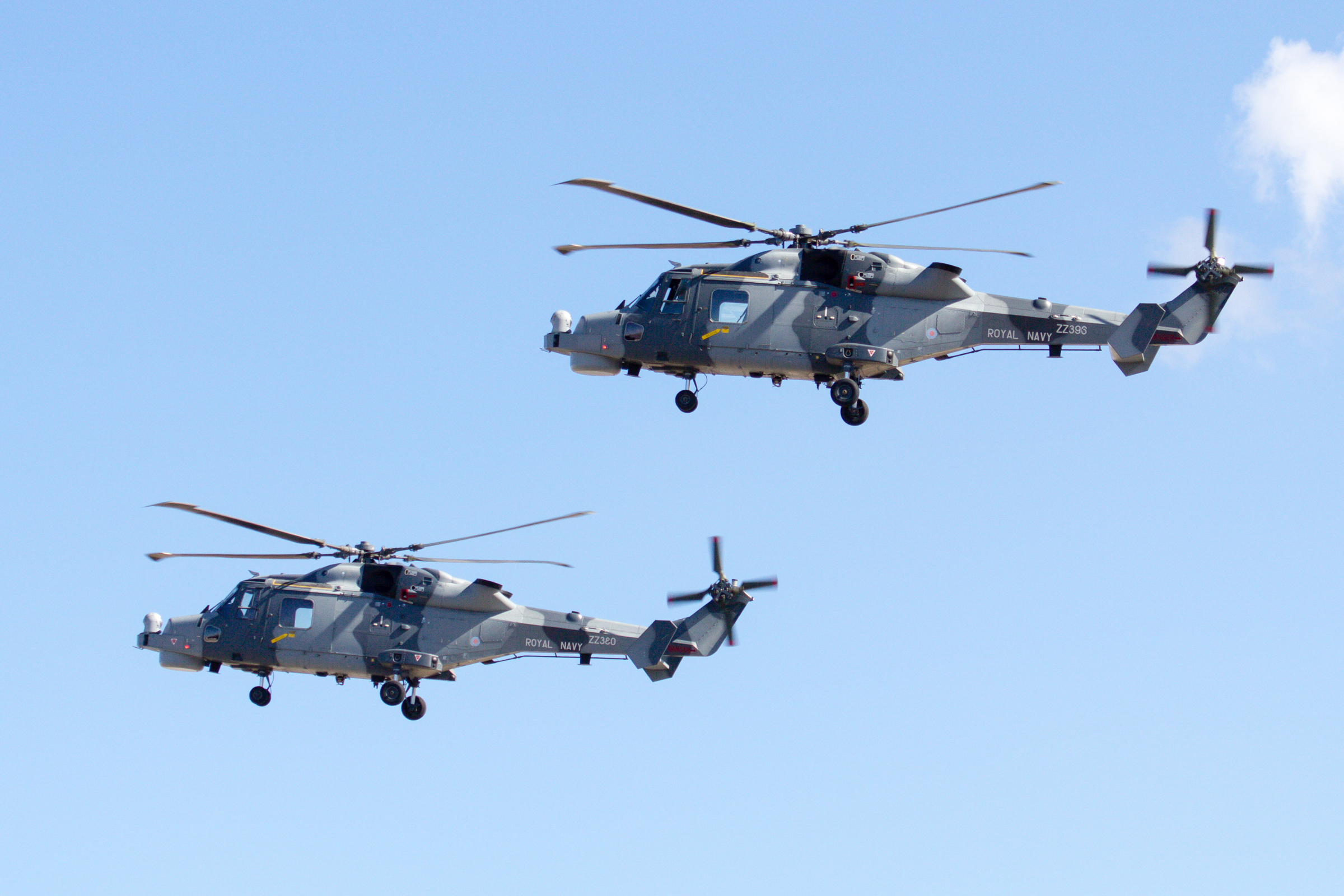
The Royal Navy Black Cats flying the AgustaWestland Wildcat at the 2015 airshow

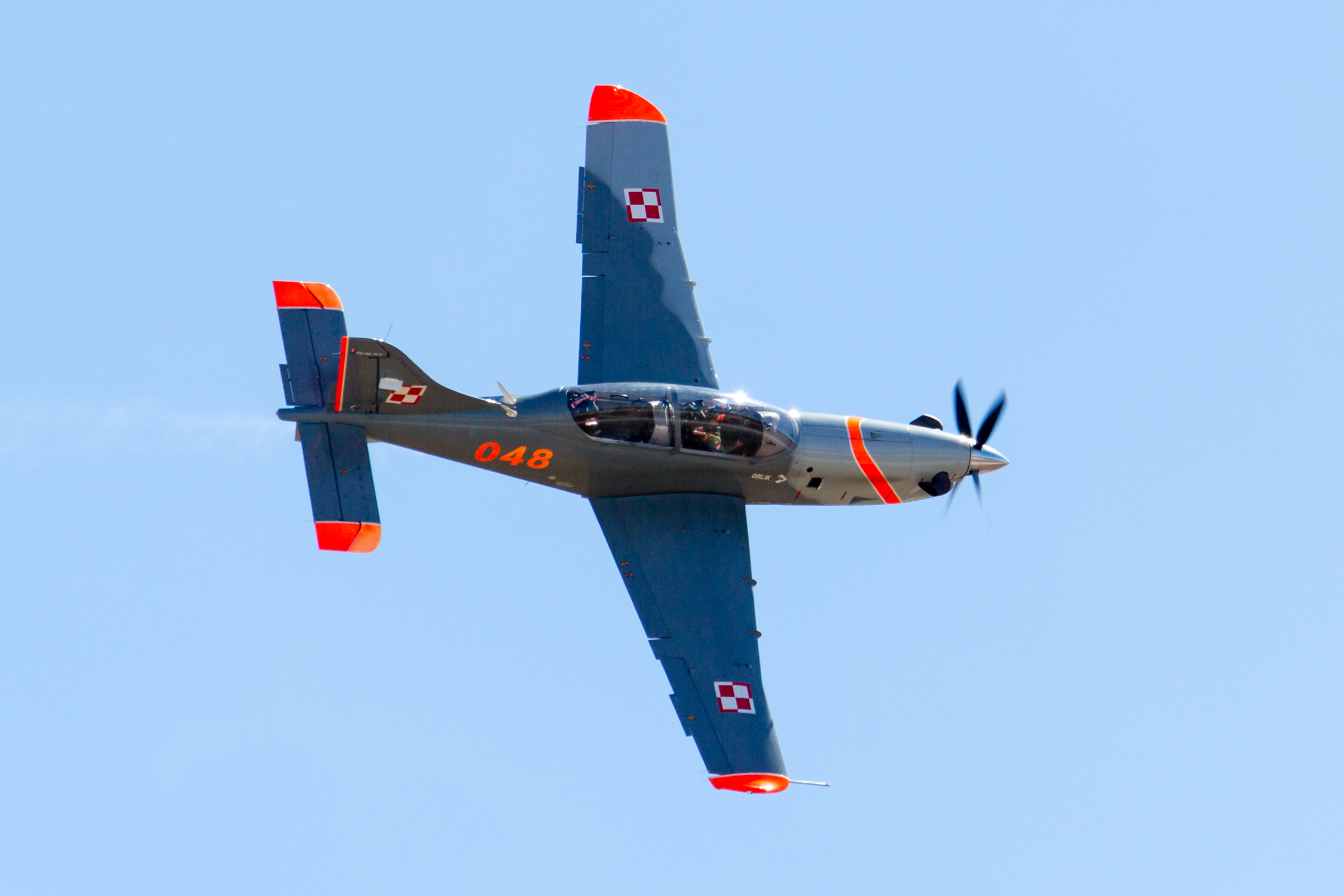
The Polish Air Force's Orlik aerobatic team performing at the 2015 airshow

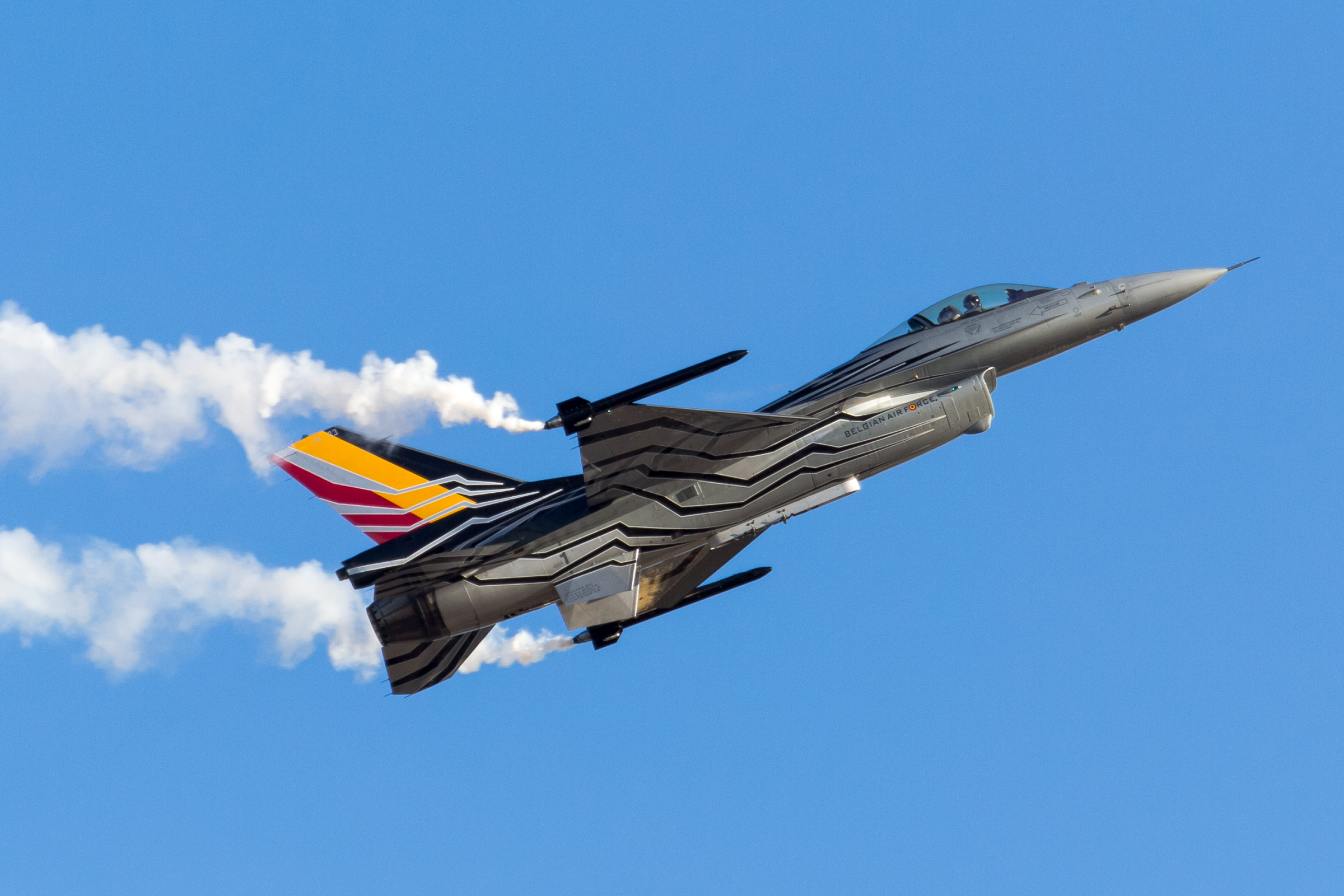
Belgian Air Component F-16 FA-123 performing at the 2015 airshow

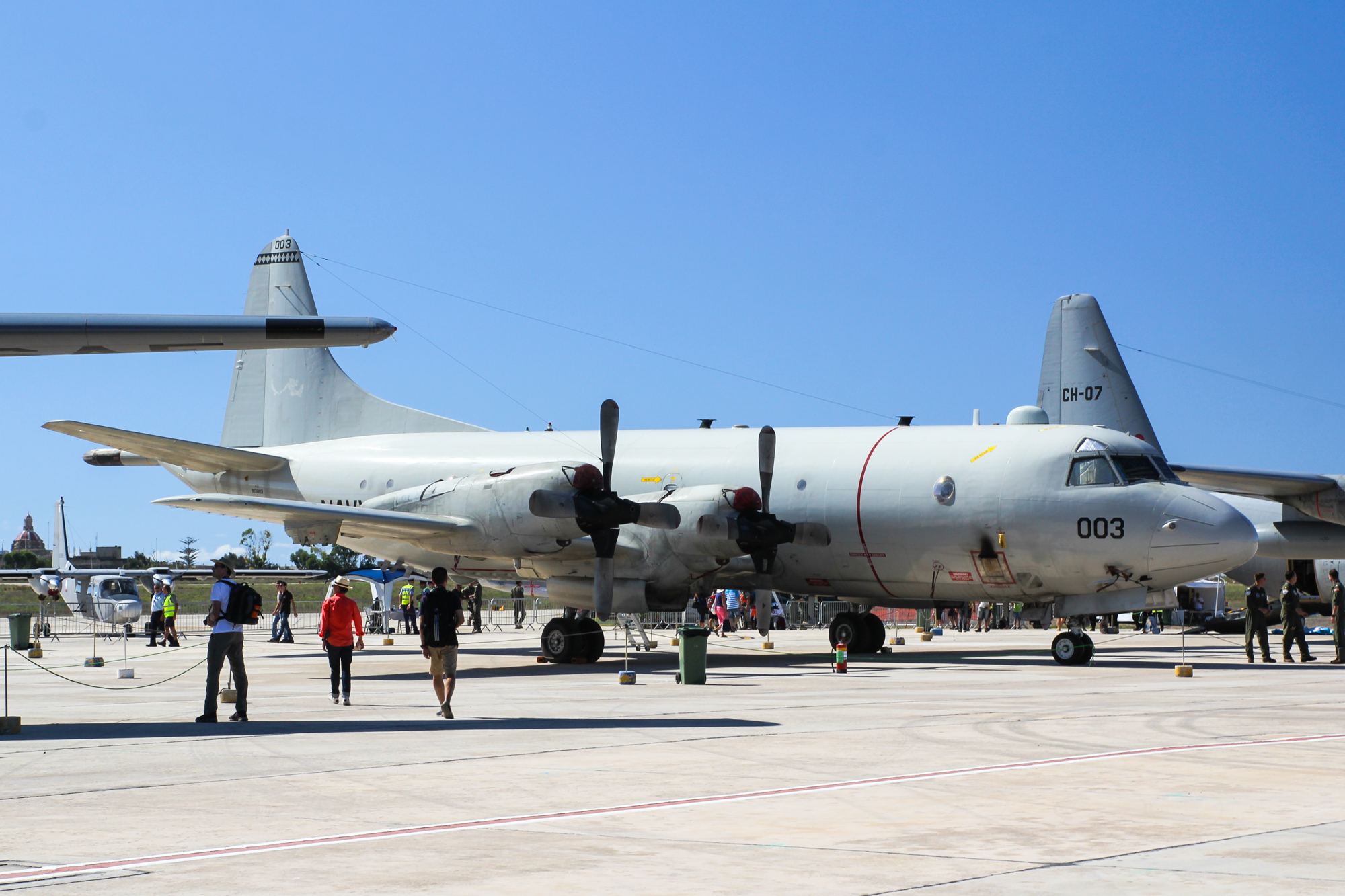
USN Lockheed P-3C Orion at the 2015 airshow
