= 2016 CAE Aviation Fairchild Merlin crash =

Fatal aviation disaster near Kirkop, Malta

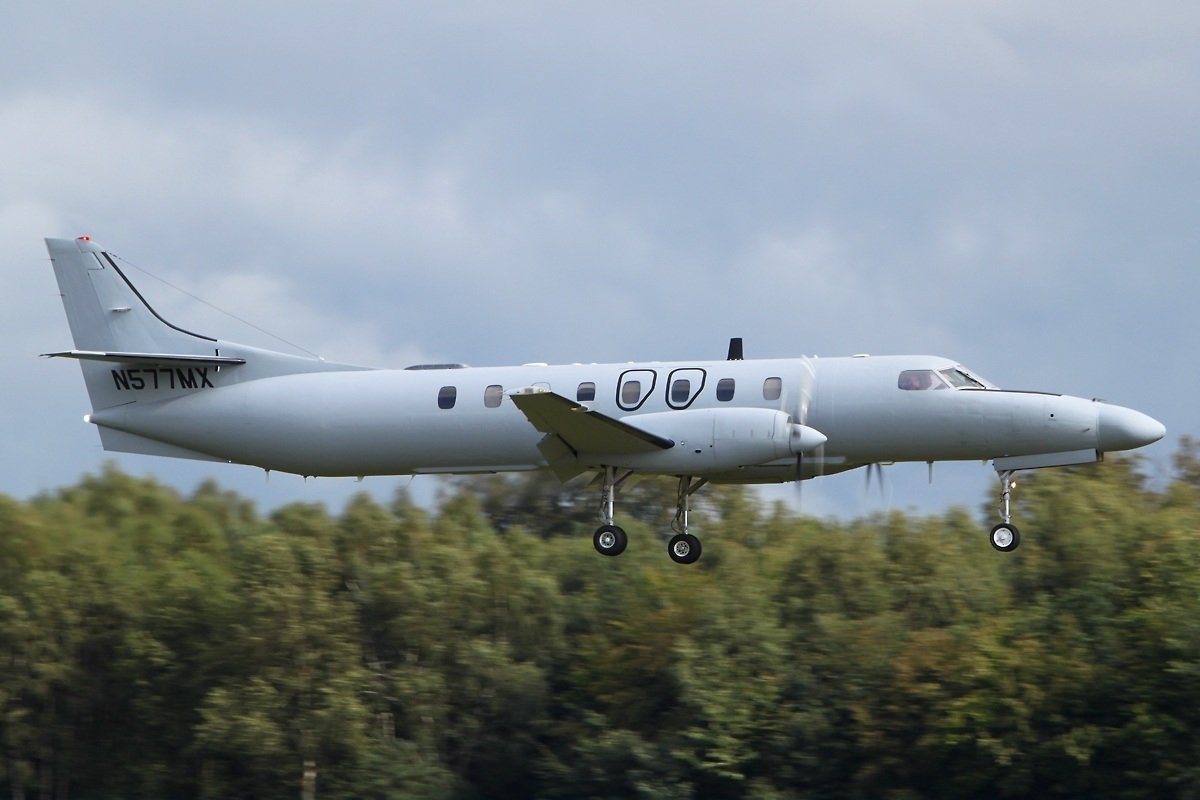
- N577MX, the aircraft involved in the accident, photographed in 2011

Accident
- Date: 24 October 2016
- Summary: Mechanical Failure
- Site: Malta International Airport, near Kirkop, Malta; 35°50′38.5″N 14°29′29.3″E

Aircraft
- Aircraft type: Fairchild SA227-AT Merlin IVC
- Operator: CAE Aviation
- Registration: N577MX
- Flight origin: Malta International Airport
- Destination: Malta International Airport
- Occupants: 5
- Passengers: 3
- Crew: 2
- Fatalities: 5
- Survivors: 0

On 24 October 2016, a twin turboprop Fairchild SA227-AT Merlin IVC operated by CAE Aviation crashed near Kirkop, Malta, shortly after take-off from Malta International Airport. The aircraft was to operate in the vicinity of Misrata in Libya on a surveillance mission by the French Ministry of Defence. All five people on board the aircraft died in the crash, making it the deadliest aviation accident in Malta since 1975.

== Aircraft ==
The aircraft involved was a Fairchild SA227-AT Merlin IVC, registered in the United States as N577MX. The aircraft, which had been built in 1983, did not have a history of technical issues, and had last undergone an airworthiness inspection in 2011.

The aircraft belonged to Worldwide Aircraft Services and at the time of the crash was leased to Luxembourg-based CAE Aviation, operating on behalf of the French Ministry of Defence.

The SA227 is capable of being flown either by a single pilot or by two pilots. On the accident flight, the aircraft was being flown by a single pilot accompanied by a monitoring pilot. The monitoring pilot was not certified to fly SA227 aircraft, nor was he required to be.

== Accident ==
The aircraft took off from Malta International Airport at around 07:20, bound for Misrata in Libya on a surveillance flight; and was due to land back at Malta at the conclusion of the mission. Just after takeoff, the aircraft pitched up to an unusual attitude, rolled right, and crashed into the ground, bursting into flames upon impact. The wreckage landed on the airport perimeter road within the limits of the village of Kirkop, with some debris falling into a nearby Armed Forces of Malta barracks. All five people on board, three passengers and two crew members, died in the crash. All were French nationals, and the passengers were employees of the defence ministry, while the crew worked for CAE Aviation.

== Aftermath ==
Immediately after the crash, the staff at Mater Dei Hospital were placed in major incident mode. The Malta International Airport was shut down for four hours after the crash before reopening at 11:30. Many flights that were bound to Malta had to be diverted to Sicily.

The Maltese government issued a statement that the flight was part of a French customs surveillance operation to combat drug- and human trafficking that had been ongoing for five months. However, the French customs department tweeted that none of its officials were on board, and French Minister of Defence Jean-Yves Le Drian later said that three of the dead were defence ministry employees within the Directorate-General for External Security. However, Maltese Minister for Home Affairs and National Security Carmelo Abela stuck to the government's original statement that the aircraft was involved in a customs operation, and the flight's exact purpose was unclear.

Aviation experts, as well as Maltese Prime Minister Joseph Muscat, stated that the crash was likely a result of a mechanical failure or pilot error. Malta's Bureau of Air Accident Investigation had responsibility for conducting an investigation of the accident.

This was the worst aviation accident on Maltese soil since the 1975 Żabbar Avro Vulcan crash that killed six people and injured another twenty.

== Investigation ==
The aircraft was not fitted with a flight data recorder or a cockpit voice recorder. However, the crash was recorded by multiple cameras, several of which also recorded audio. When combined with data retrieved from the memory in a GPS receiver located in the wreckage, a fairly accurate reconstruction of the aircraft's final moments could be created. The takeoff roll proceeded normally; however, after leaving the ground, the aircraft continued to pitch upwards, reaching a nose high attitude of 34 degrees within four seconds of rotation. At this point, the aircraft rolled to the right, consistent with a power-on stall (due to the direction of rotation of the propellers, the right wing will stall before the left one at high engine power). The aircraft reached a maximum right bank angle of 152 degrees, at which point the direction of the roll reversed. The aircraft struck the ground at a 70 degree right bank and 38 degree nose-down pitch, just ten seconds after lifting off. Analysis of the audio from several security cameras found no evidence of engine problems, nor could any engine issue explain the aircraft's performance.

The aircraft had undergone substantial modifications to its flight control system in 1985; several cables had been re-routed to accommodate the special surveillance equipment installed. The aircraft's stick pusher system, known on the Merlin as the stall avoidance system (SAS), had also been altered for this reason. An examination of the bulb filaments in the cockpit annunciator panel revealed that at some point prior to impact, the SAS FAULT annunciator had illuminated. In addition, recent maintenance had been performed to the aircraft's flight control system, but maintenance instructions for the modified version of the system were not available when this was done. Damage to the wreckage prevented a conclusive analysis of the primary flight controls or the SAS. Based on the performance of the aircraft, the evidence recovered from the wreckage and a study of previous incidents involving aircraft in the same family, the BEA narrowed the cause of the crash to three possibilities.

=== Possible causes ===
The most plausible of the three would have been a failure or jamming in the nose down cable of the elevator control system. This scenario would explain why the aircraft continued to pitch up beyond the recommended climb attitude after rotation. In this case, the pilot would not have been able to counteract the upwards moment through pushing forward on the control column. Depending on the nature of the failure, the control column itself would not necessarily have jammed, which would have made the problem more difficult to recognize immediately. The only way to overcome an elevator control failure would be through the pitch trim system, but the aircraft reached a stall situation too quickly for this to be effective. (Note: Unlike most aircraft of its size, there is no elevator trim tab on the SA227. Instead, the pitch trim system consists of a trimmable horizontal stabiliser driven by one of two electrical actuators (one controlled by each pilot). The rear attachment points of the horizontal stabiliser form a pivot and the front of the stabiliser is attached to the actuators. Operating an actuator moves the front of the horizontal stabiliser up or down to adjust the pitch trim. It takes more than thirty seconds for an actuator to move the stabiliser from one end of its travel to the other.) As the aircraft approached a stall, the stick pusher would have activated. As the pusher servo is connected to the same control cabling as the control column, it would have been unable to function correctly, explaining the illumination of the SAS FAULT light.

A less likely but still possible hypothesis was an inadvertent activation of the stick pusher system. This was considered possible due to the relocation of the SAS components to an area near a water evacuation drain on the aircraft. If the pusher servo had activated at the point of rotation, the pilot may have reflexively pulled against it with enough force to disable it, causing an abrupt pitch-up. Inadvertent SAS activation had happened on other SA-227 aircraft. However, the aircraft's flight path did not fully support this scenario. If the stick pusher had activated erroneously and been over-corrected by the pilot, the aircraft would likely have pitched down slightly before rapidly pitching up. Instead, the upwards pitch was more or less constant until the moment the aircraft stalled. Nevertheless, without more accurate flight data, the theory could not be ruled out completely.

The least likely of the three involved the antenna for the HF radio (consisting of a cable extending from the upper forward fuselage to the tip of the vertical stabiliser) snapping during rotation. Afterwards, the cable may have become wrapped around the right-hand elevator, jamming it upwards. The HF antenna is not standard equipment on the SA-227, and the type installed had been known to fail occasionally. In 1998, a cable had jammed the elevator of a SOCATA MS.893 into a nose-down position, causing a fatal crash. Regardless, no components from the cable were found on the runway, and the physics involved to cause the cable to jam the aircraft's elevators were considered extremely improbable.

The final report concluded that whichever malfunction occurred "probably originated in the specific modifications of the aircraft and in the application of an inappropriate maintenance to these modifications."
