= Ryanair Flight 1879 =

2026 aviation incident over Greece

- 9H-QEU, the aircraft involved, pictured in 2024

Accident
- Date: 10 July 2026
- Summary: Uncontained engine failure following a suspected bird strike, causing a cabin window to break and a passenger to be partially ejected
- Site: Polykastro, Greece

Aircraft
- Aircraft type: Boeing 737-800
- Operator: Malta Air for Ryanair
- IATA flight No.: FR1879
- ICAO flight No.: RYR1879
- Call sign: RYANAIR 1879
- Registration: 9H-QEU
- Flight origin: Thessaloniki Airport, Greece
- Destination: Memmingen Airport, Germany
- Occupants: 155
- Passengers: 149
- Crew: 6
- Fatalities: 0
- Injuries: 1
- Survivors: 155

Ryanair Flight 1879 was an international passenger flight operated by Malta Air on behalf of Ryanair that suffered an incident on 10 July 2026. A window broke after an uncontained failure of the aircraft's right engine, and a passenger was partially sucked out of the aircraft. The passenger survived with severe injuries. The Boeing 737-800, which was delivered to Ryanair 18 years prior and registered as 9H-QEU, was flying from Thessaloniki Airport (SKG) in Greece to Memmingen Airport (FMM) in Germany. The occurrence was classified as a Category 3 damage event by the International Civil Aviation Organization (ICAO).

== Flight history ==
08:14

The Boeing 737 took off from runway 34 at Thessaloniki Airport at 08:14 local time. The takeoff and initial climb were uneventful.

08:22

The aircraft was flying at an altitude of approximately 16,000 feet (4.9 km) when it experienced severe vibration caused by an uncontained engine failure in the right-hand engine (engine No. 2). Fan blades failed structurally, and fragments broke away at high rotational speed, penetrating the engine casing. The fragments subsequently struck the aircraft fuselage and a passenger window with considerable force.

Cabin decompression

The damaged window at seat 11F caused rapid decompression as the cabin pressure equalized with the lower outside pressure at an altitude of 16,000 feet. The resulting airflow pulled the upper body of 61-year-old Serbian passenger Ljubiša Karović partially out of the aircraft. He lost consciousness several times and was pulled back and restrained by his wife, Svetlana Grković, and other passengers. The oxygen masks deployed automatically from the overhead compartments.

Flight deck response

The pilots immediately initiated a descent to 10,000 feet (approximately 3,000 m), an altitude at which breathing without supplemental oxygen is generally possible. Engine No. 2 was shut down. The pilots also set the transponder to code 7700, indicating a general emergency, and diverted the aircraft back to Thessaloniki.

08:34

Approximately 20 minutes after departure, the aircraft landed back at Thessaloniki Airport. Emergency services were waiting on the apron and transported the seriously injured passenger to a hospital. The remaining passengers were evacuated and waited at the airport for a replacement aircraft, which departed for Germany at 09:53.

== Cause ==
In a preliminary accident report, investigators identified a bird strike as the suspected initiating event. During the disassembly of the engine, a CFM56-7B, investigators found evidence including organic residue indicating that birds had entered the engine. The strike triggered a sequence of events in which fan blade fragments broke away, reportedly in connection with material fatigue. The National Transportation Safety Board (NTSB), Greek authorities and Boeing conducted investigations into the occurrence.

The right-hand engine had last been inspected using ultrasonic testing on 24 May 2026, with no abnormalities detected. Four additional suspected bird strikes had been recorded during the preceding 12 months, which may have contributed to undetected prior damage. The aircraft had completed only 253 flights since its last major inspection.

== Ryanair's response ==
While the investigation was ongoing, Ryanair chief executive Michael O'Leary publicly attributed the incident to a bird strike. O'Leary stated that he did not believe the passenger had been sucked out of the window, but rather had been pulled dangerously close to it. He also questioned the account that the passenger's wife had held his legs, as booking records reportedly placed her three rows behind him. The NTSB subsequently reminded O'Leary of the international aviation investigation guidelines under Annex 13 to the Convention on International Civil Aviation, which restrict the release of information and comments by parties to an ongoing investigation.

Svetlana Grković, the wife of passenger Ljubiša Karović, criticized the conduct of the cabin crew on several occasions. According to her account, which was reportedly supported by other passengers, no crew member helped pull her husband fully back into the aircraft or provide him with medical assistance. Ryanair stated that its internal safety procedures required crew members to put on oxygen masks immediately following a loss of cabin pressure and remain seated until the aircraft reached the safe altitude of 10,000 feet. According to the accident report, once the aircraft had reached that altitude, the crew attempted to reduce the airflow through the broken window using metal containers. The family subsequently initiated legal proceedings.

== Also See ==
- Southwest Airlines Flight 1380, a nearly identical incident involving a partially sucked out passenger on a 737.
- TAM Airlines Flight 9755, a similar incident involving a Fokker 100.
- National Airlines Flight 27, a incident where a passenger was completely sucked out of a DC-10.
