= Luqa =

Luqa Ħal Luqa Casal Luca
- Local council
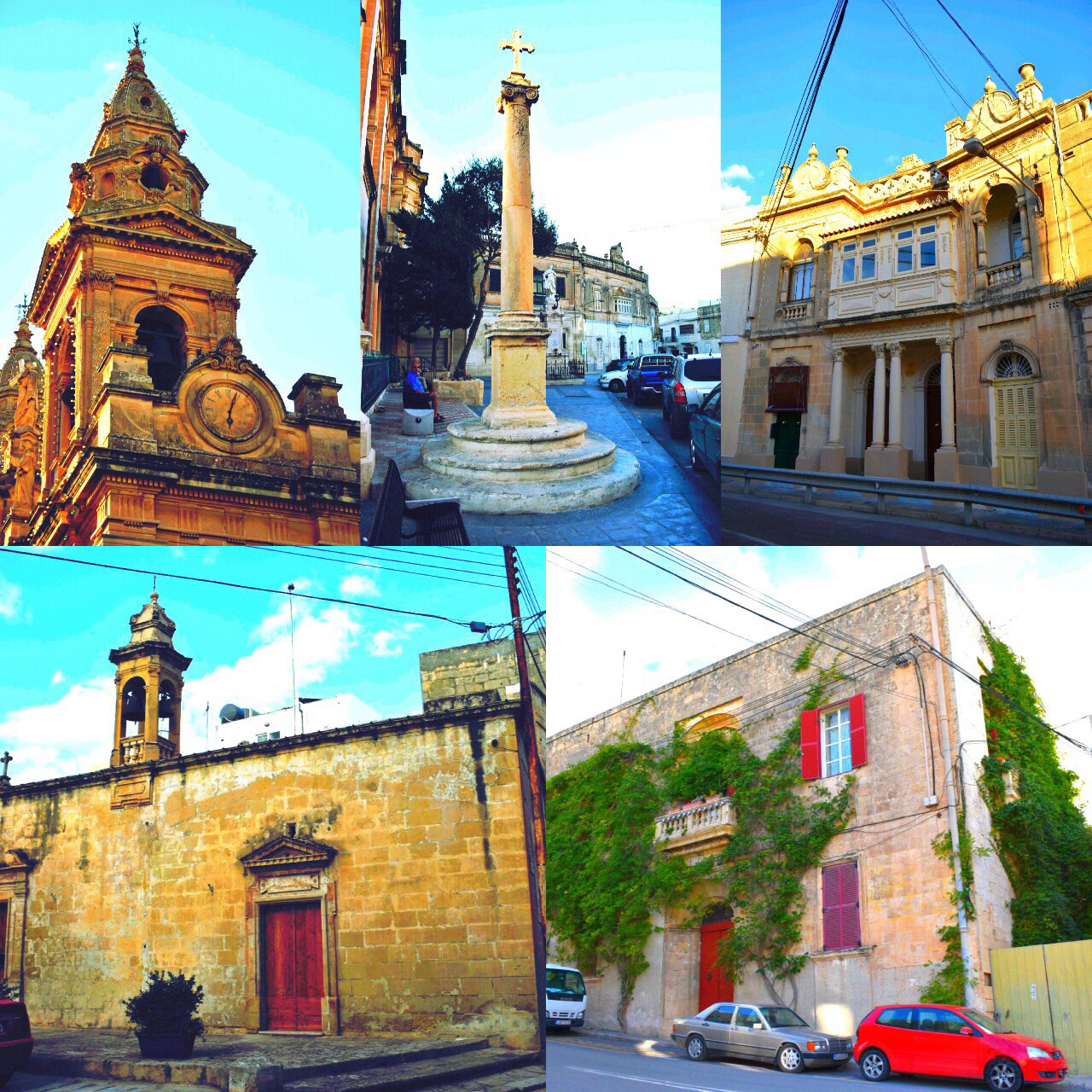
- Clockwise from top left:Tower of the Parish Church of St Andrew, Dejma Cross, Neo-Baroque building, Tal-Ftajjar Chapel, and former British military building

- Flag Coat of arms

- Coordinates: 35°51′35″N 14°29′21″E
- Country: Malta
- Region: Southern Region
- District: Southern Harbour District
- Borders: Birzebbuga, Għaxaq, Gudja, Kirkop, Marsa, Mqabba, Paola, Qormi, Safi, Santa Luċija, Siġġiewi, Tarxien, Zurrieq

Government
  - Mayor: John Schembri (PL)

Area
  - Total: 6.7 km^{2} (2.6 sq mi)

Population (Jul. 2024)
  - Total: 7,360
  - Density: 1,100/km^{2} (2,800/sq mi)
- Demonym(s): Ħalluqi (m), Ħalluqija (f), Ħalluqin (pl)
- Time zone: UTC+1 (CET)
  - Summer (DST): UTC+2 (CEST)
- Postal code: LQA
- Dialing code: 356
- ISO 3166 code: MT-25
- Patron saint: St. Andrew
- Day of festa: First Sunday of July (main feast); 30 November (liturgical feast)
- Website: www.luqalocalcouncil.com

Luqa (Maltese: Ħal Luqa [ħɐl ˈluːʔɐ], lit. 'poplar') is a town located in the Southern Region of Malta, 4.3 km away from the capital Valletta. With a population of 5,945 as of March 2014, it is a small but densely populated settlement which is typical of Malta's older towns and villages. Luqa is centered around a main square which contains a church dedicated to St. Andrew. The patron saint's traditional feast is celebrated on the first Sunday of July, with the liturgical feast being celebrated on 30 November. The Malta International Airport is located in Luqa.

Notable residents of the town included Michelangelo Sapiano (1826–1912), a well-known clockmaker and inventor whose work includes the clock in the parish church's belfry. The house where he lived is located on Pawlu Magri Street.

== History ==
In 1592 the village of Luqa was hit by a plague epidemic, which hit all the population of Malta and caused many deaths. A sign of this sad episode is the cemetery found in Carmel Street, Alley 4 where people were buried in a field changed into a cemetery. The village of Luqa originally formed part of the parish of Gudja until it was established as a separate parish by a decree issued by Pope Urban VIII on 15 May 1634.

Another tragedy for Luqa was the cholera epidemic of 1850 where 13 people died. A cemetery is still present in Valletta Road as a reminder of this tragedy.

During the early 20th century Luqa took prominence because of the airport. The Royal Air Force established RAF Station Luqa, an airfield with runways which later on evolved as a civilian airport. The RAF established military and civilian buildings in the area close to the airfield/airport and in Ħal Farruġ. They used the airfield until it closed on 31 March 1979 when it was transferred to the Maltese Government to be transformed into a civilian airport. However they still used the domestic site for their own military force.

Many people died during the Second World War in Luqa, and many buildings destroyed due to heavy bombardment. A tragedy which is still remembered happened on 9 April 1942 when a bomb hit a wartime shelter and a well and the people inside the shelter were buried alive. The Local Council still remembers the people who died during WWII with a ceremony of the laying of bay wreaths together with the other local organisations and clubs.

The patron Saint of Luqa is St. Andrew (Sant' Andrija). A local niche dedicated to him is found in Luqa, which is two storeys high.

== Governance ==
Citizens of Luqa vote for their local council every three years, which council consists of seven members, one of them being the mayor. The Mayor of Luqa is John Schembri.

== Economy ==
Air Malta and Medavia have their head offices at Malta International Airport in Luqa.

== Zones in Ħal Luqa ==
- Għammieri
- Ħal Farruġ
- Qasam Industrijali Ħal Luqa (Ħal Luqa Industrial Estate)
- Ħal Saflieni
- Taċ-Ċagħki
- Taċ-Ċawla
- Tal-Bandieri
- Wied Betti
- Wied il-Knejjes
- Xagħra tas-Simar

== Geography and climate ==
As other parts of Malta, Luqa has a Mediterranean climate (Köppen Csa), with mild winters and hot summers. The annual average temperature is 19.3 °C (66.7 °F).

Climate data for Malta (Luqa in the south-east part of main island, 1981–2010)
Month	Jan	Feb	Mar	Apr	May	Jun	Jul	Aug	Sep	Oct	Nov	Dec	Year
Mean daily maximum °C (°F)	15.6 (60.1)	15.6 (60.1)	17.3 (63.1)	19.8 (67.6)	24.1 (75.4)	28.6 (83.5)	31.5 (88.7)	31.8 (89.2)	28.5 (83.3)	25.0 (77.0)	20.7 (69.3)	17.1 (62.8)	23.0 (73.4)
Daily mean °C (°F)	12.8 (55.0)	12.5 (54.5)	13.9 (57.0)	16.1 (61.0)	19.8 (67.6)	23.9 (75.0)	26.6 (79.9)	27.2 (81.0)	24.7 (76.5)	21.5 (70.7)	17.7 (63.9)	14.4 (57.9)	19.3 (66.7)
Mean daily minimum °C (°F)	9.9 (49.8)	9.4 (48.9)	10.6 (51.1)	12.4 (54.3)	15.5 (59.9)	19.1 (66.4)	21.7 (71.1)	22.6 (72.7)	20.8 (69.4)	18.1 (64.6)	14.6 (58.3)	11.6 (52.9)	15.5 (59.9)
Average precipitation mm (inches)	98.5 (3.88)	60.1 (2.37)	44.2 (1.74)	20.7 (0.81)	16.0 (0.63)	4.6 (0.18)	0.3 (0.01)	12.8 (0.50)	58.6 (2.31)	82.9 (3.26)	92.3 (3.63)	109.2 (4.30)	595.8 (23.46)
Average precipitation days (≥ 1.0 mm)	10	7	5	4	1	1	0	1	4	6	9	10	58
Mean monthly sunshine hours	159.0	171.0	224.0	247.0	300.0	328.0	365.0	338.0	260.0	221.0	185.0	156.0	2,954
Source: Meteo Climate (1981–2010 Data), German Meteorological Service (sunshine duration 1961-1990)

== Demographics ==
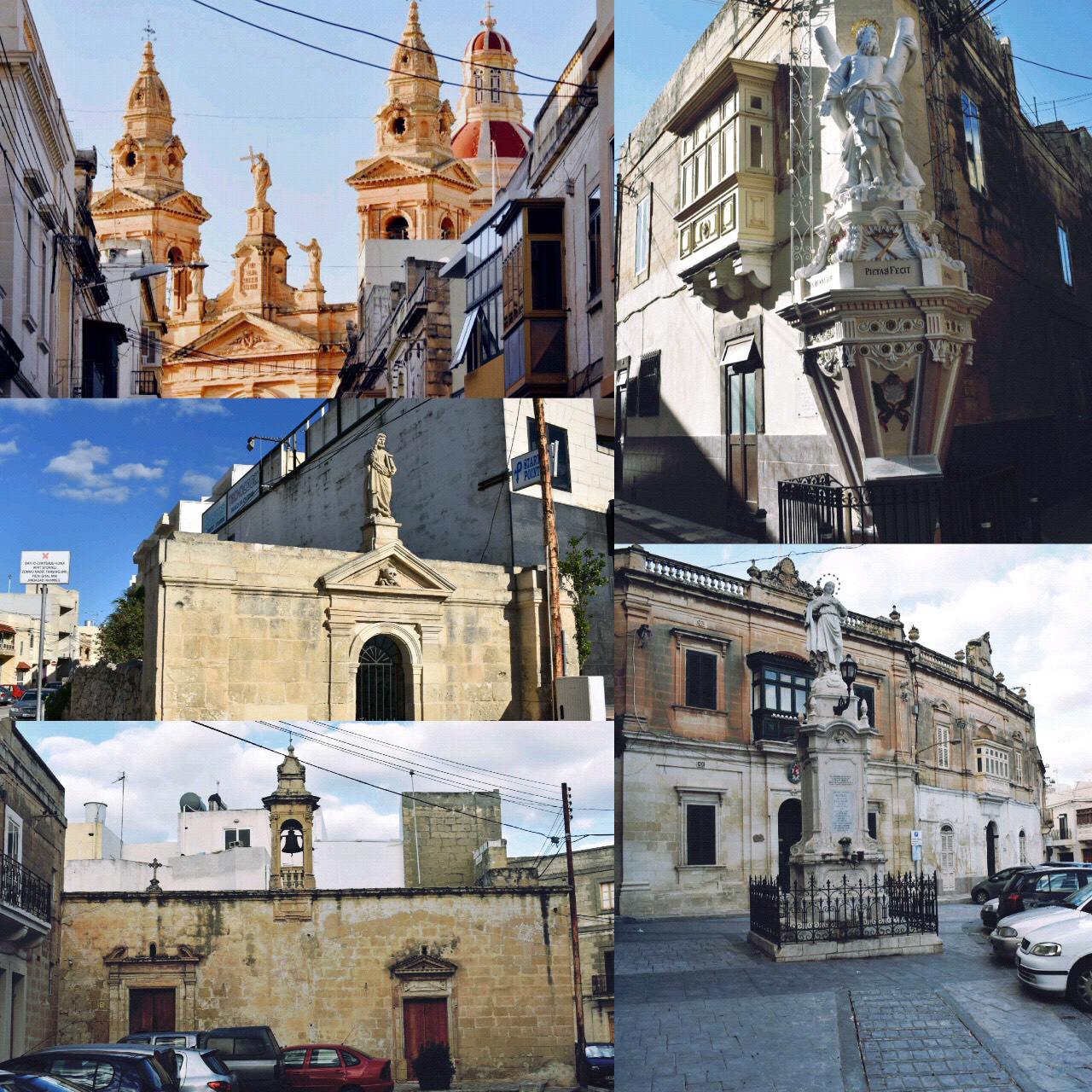
Sites in Luqa

The population of Luqa was 7,360 in July 2024. This included 3,877 males and 3,483 females; 5,331 Maltese nationals and 2,029 foreign nationals.

== Notable people ==
Ċettina Darmenia Brincat (1931–2023), businesswoman and politician.

Michelangelo Sapiano (1826 - 1912), clockmaker and inventor.

== See also ==
- Unione Philharmonic Society
