= Malta International Airport =

Airport in Luqa, Malta

- IATA: MLA; ICAO: LMML

Summary
- Airport type: Public
- Owner: Malta International Airport plc
- Location: Luqa, Malta
- Hub for: KM Malta Airlines; Medavia; Universal Air
- Operating base for: Ryanair (Malta Air)
- Elevation AMSL: 300 ft (91 m)
- Coordinates: 35°51′27″N 014°28′39″E
- Website: www.maltairport.com

Map
- Location on a map of Malta

Runways
Direction	Length		Surface
Direction	m	ft	Surface
05/23	2,377	7,799	Asphalt concrete
13/31	3,544	11,627	Asphalt concrete

Statistics (2024)
- Passengers: 8,957,451
- Passenger change 23-24: ▲14.79%
- Aircraft movements: 58,773
- Movements change 23-24: ▲14.45%
- Cargo (kilos): 23,624,455
- Cargo change 23-24: ▲14.44%
- RWY source: ARINC eff. 2020-01-30

Malta International Airport (IATA: MLA, ICAO: LMML) is the only international airport in Malta, and it serves the whole of the Maltese Islands. It is located on the island of Malta, southwest of the Maltese capital, Valletta, in the town of Luqa, and occupies the location of the former RAF Luqa. The airport serves as the main hub for KM Malta Airlines and Medavia besides being an operating base for Ryanair and its subsidiary Malta Air. It is also home to the Area Control Center and hosts the annual Malta Airshow. The airport is operated by Malta International Airport plc.

It has been the hub of KM Malta Airlines since March 2024 and the hub of its predecessor, Air Malta, from 1974 to 2024.

== History ==
=== Early years ===
The first civil airfield was constructed at Ta' Qali, followed by others at Ħal Far (RAF Hal Far) and Luqa. During the Second World War, the airfields at Ta' Qali and Ħal Far were severely battered and civil operations subsequently centred on Luqa Airport.

The increase in passenger handling and aircraft movements necessitated the construction of a civil air terminal. Preparations started in 1956, and the British Government mainly financed what was then a £300,000 project. Malta's new passenger air terminal at Luqa was inaugurated on 31 March 1958 by then Governor of Malta Sir Robert Laycock. The air terminal consisted of two floors including some basic facilities such as a restaurant, a post office, a cable and wireless office and a viewing balcony for the public.

In October 1977, a new and longer runway was launched and works commenced on the extension and refurbishment of the air terminal. An arrivals lounge and another lounge dedicated to VIPs were added and the original part of the terminal building was used for departures.

This refurbishment was not enough as it still lacked certain essential facilities. Immediately after a change in government in 1987, the new administration decided that the 35-year-old terminal was past its time (Luqa Terminal) and therefore gave the green light for the construction of a new air terminal along Park 9 (now located in Gudja).

Until the construction of the new air terminal was completed, the Government embarked on a further upgrade of the old air terminal. The facilities introduced included air conditioning, new baggage carousels, flight information monitors, computerised check-in desks, a new floor surface and new retail outlets including a larger duty-free area.

=== Development since the 1990s ===
The foundation stone of the present air terminal in Gudja was laid in September 1989 and it was inaugurated in record time 29 months later, in February 1992. Malta International Airport became fully operational on 25 March 1992, and the old Luqa passenger terminal was effectively closed down after 35 years. In November 1995, Balkan Bulgarian Airlines introduced a flight from Sofia to New York City that stopped in Malta. The service on Boeing 767s resulted from a partnership between Balkan and Air Malta.

In January 2020, a new terminal expansion project was unveiled, but was cancelled due to the Covid-19 Pandemic. However, in 2025, it was revived by the airport CEO, with plans to expand the airport to the east and west. The eastern expansion will improve the arrivals area, while the western expansion will provide a 6000 square metre upgrade to the departures area, which is planned to increase the total check-in desks to 68 from 36, and total gates to 24 from 18

Its passenger numbers have increased from 3.5 million in 2011 to almost 9 million in 2024. The increase in passenger numbers is mainly due to the increased number of routes served by low-cost carriers. Ryanair based one aircraft in Malta from May 2010, increasing to two in May 2012, three in March 2016, four in March 2017, five in March 2018 and further to six in April 2019. The largest aircraft visiting Malta International Airport regularly is the daily Emirates Boeing 777-300. The airport has received occasional visits by the Airbus A380, usually for repainting at one of the local maintenance facilities.

== Facilities ==
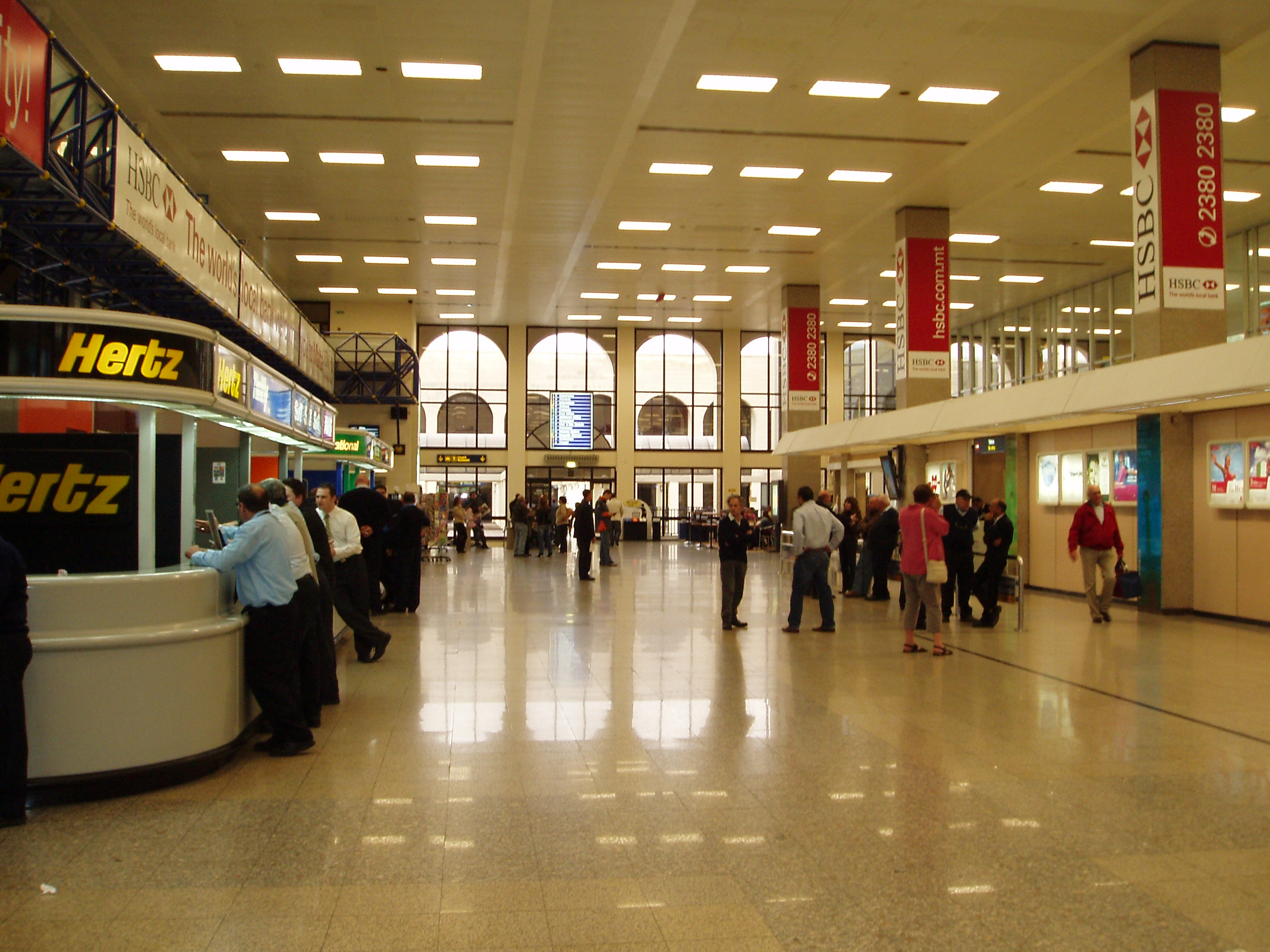
Arrivals area

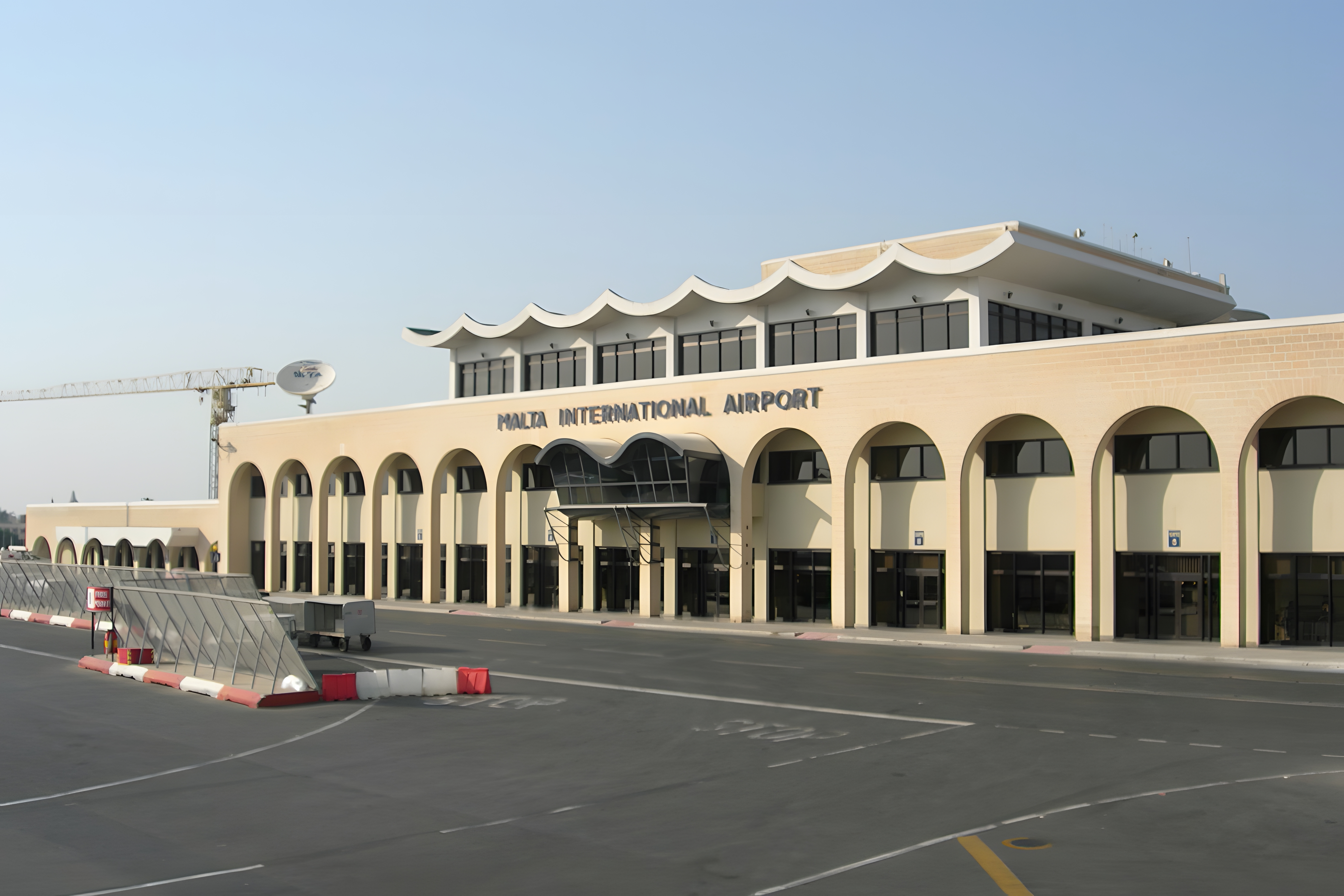
Apron view of the main building

=== Overview ===
The airport has a single passenger terminal which became fully operational on 25 March 1992. This replaced the old Luqa terminal which is by 2020 mostly used for cargo. Malta International Airport air terminal operations include general passenger services, and the operation of an extensive range of retail services at the airport, airside and landside shops, restaurants, and other outlets, which are all operated on concession agreements. The airport offers one VIP lounge, the La Valette Club. The airport also hosts several maintenance facilities including those operated by Lufthansa Technik and SR Technics.

=== Other facilities ===
The head office of Medavia is on the airport property.

Located within the grounds of Malta International Airport, the Business Centre is the first building in Malta to have applied for BREEAM (BRE Environmental Assessment Method) to become the island's first Grade A office park. The head office of Air Malta is at Level 2 of the Skyparks Business Centre.

The Malta Airport MetOffice is part of the Malta International Airport and provides the function of a national meteorological service for Malta. Although they primarily serve aviation they also service the public sector. All equipment, other than the Doppler Weather Radar, is enhanced by automatic weather stations, of which eight are situated in Malta and Gozo. At the same time an aerodrome weather observation system is located at the airport. The MetOffice is able to get information from the Agencia Estatal de Meteorología in Madrid and the UK's Met Office along with numerical weather models such as those provided by the European Centre for Medium-Range Weather Forecasts in Reading, England.

== Military usage ==
The Air Wing of the Armed Forces of Malta is based at Malta International Airport. The Air Wing terminal consists of six hangars. The Air Wing operates a total of four fixed-wing aircraft, three helicopters and a UAV.

== Airlines and destinations ==
The following airlines operate regular scheduled and charter flights to and from Malta:

Airlines	Destinations
Aegean Airlines	Athens
Aer Lingus	Dublin
Air France	Seasonal: Paris–Charles de Gaulle
Air Serbia	Belgrade, Niš
airBaltic	Seasonal: Riga, Tallinn
British Airways	London–Gatwick
Delta Air Lines	Seasonal: New York–JFK
EasyJet	Liverpool, London–Gatwick, London–Southend, Manchester; Seasonal: Amsterdam, Basel/Mulhouse, Birmingham, Bristol, Geneva, Glasgow, Milan–Malpensa, Naples, Newcastle upon Tyne, Nice
Emirates	Dubai–International, Larnaca
Eurowings	Düsseldorf; Seasonal: Hamburg, Stuttgart
FlyLili	Seasonal charter: Tel Aviv
ITA Airways	Seasonal: Milan–Linate, Rome–Fiumicino
Jet2.com	Birmingham, Bristol, East Midlands, Leeds/Bradford, London–Gatwick, London–Stansted, Manchester; Seasonal: Belfast–International, Edinburgh, Glasgow, Liverpool, Newcastle upon Tyne
KM Malta Airlines	Amsterdam, Berlin, Brussels, Düsseldorf, Istanbul, London–Gatwick, London–Heathrow, Lyon, Madrid, Milan–Linate, Munich, Paris–Charles de Gaulle, Paris–Orly, Prague, Rome–Fiumicino, Tel Aviv, Vienna, Zürich; Seasonal: Catania, Málaga, Palermo
LOT Polish Airlines	Warsaw–Chopin
Lufthansa	Frankfurt, Munich
Lufthansa City Airlines	Munich
Luxair	Luxembourg
Medavia	Mitiga, Misrata
MedSky Airways	Benghazi, Misrata, Tripoli–Mitiga
Norwegian Air Shuttle	Seasonal: Billund, Copenhagen, Helsinki, Oslo
Qatar Airways	Doha
Ryanair	Athens, Barcelona, Bari, Beauvais, Birmingham, Bologna, Bournemouth, Bratislava, Brussels-Charleroi, Bucharest–Otopeni, Budapest, Cagliari, Catania, Cologne/Bonn, Dublin, Edinburgh, Gdańsk, Glasgow, Gothenburg, Katowice, Kraków, Lisbon, Liverpool, London–Luton, London–Stansted, Lourdes, Luxembourg, Madrid, Manchester, Marseille, Memmingen, Milan-Bergamo, Milan–Malpensa, Nantes, Naples, Newcastle upon Tyne, Niš (ends 23 October 2026), Norwich, Palma de Mallorca, Pisa, Porto, Poznan, Riga, Rome–Fiumicino, Rzeszów, Seville, Sofia, Stockholm–Arlanda, Thessaloniki, Tirana, Toulouse, Trapani, Treviso, Trieste, Turin, Vienna, Vilnius, Warsaw–Modlin, Wrocław, Zagreb; Seasonal: Belfast–International, Chania, East Midlands, Eindhoven, Lamezia Terme, Paphos, Perugia, Pescara, Shannon, Valencia
Scandinavian Airlines	Seasonal: Copenhagen
Swiss International Air Lines	Seasonal: Zürich
Transavia	Seasonal: Nantes, Paris–Orly
Tunisair Express	Tunis
Turkish Airlines	Istanbul
Volotea	Seasonal: Bordeaux
Vueling	Barcelona
Wizz Air	Belgrade, Bucharest–Otopeni, Budapest, Cluj-Napoca, Katowice, Rome–Fiumicino, Skopje, Tirana, Warsaw–Chopin, Warsaw–Modlin

== Statistics ==
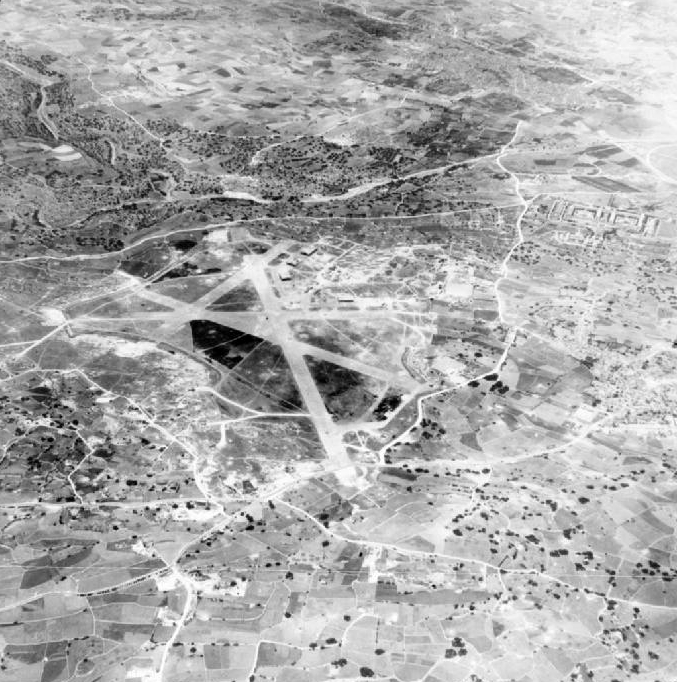
Luqa airfield in 1941

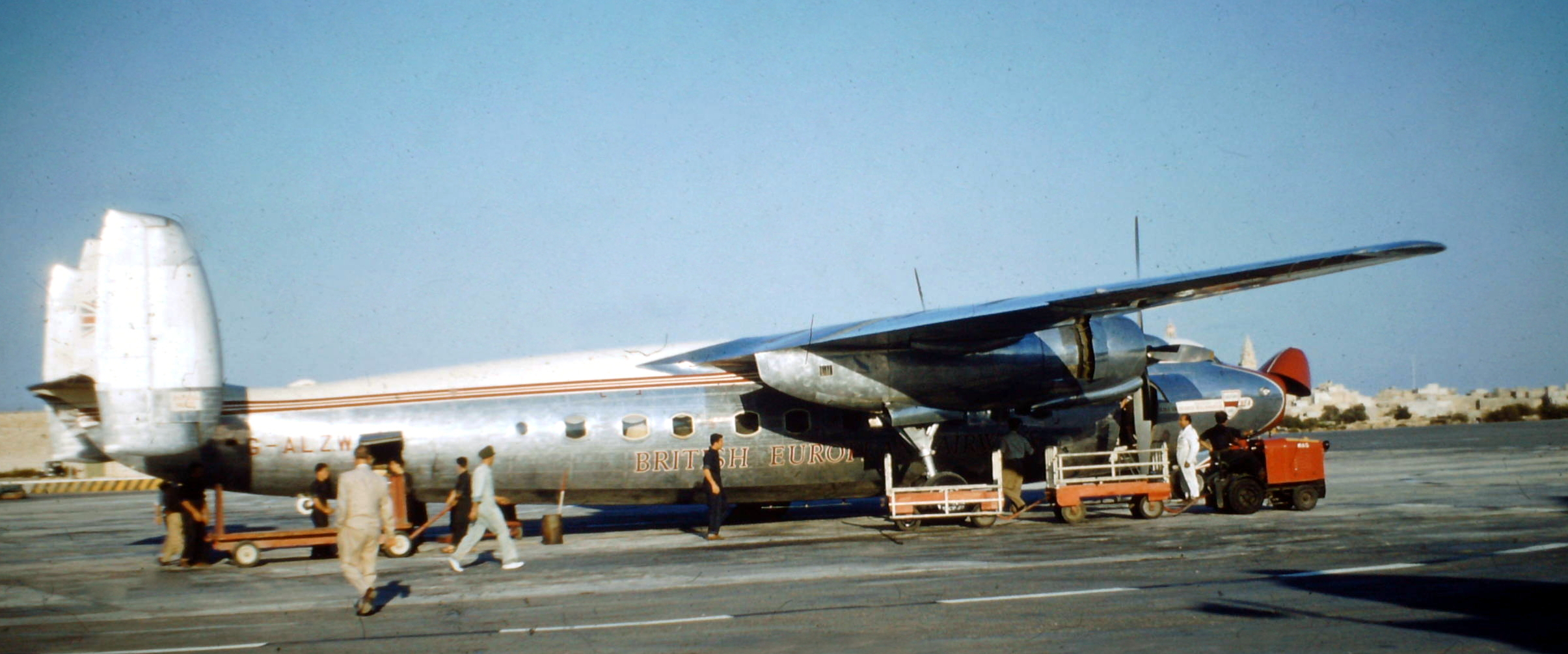
Airspeed Ambassador G-ALZW of British European Airways, at Luqa airport in October 1956

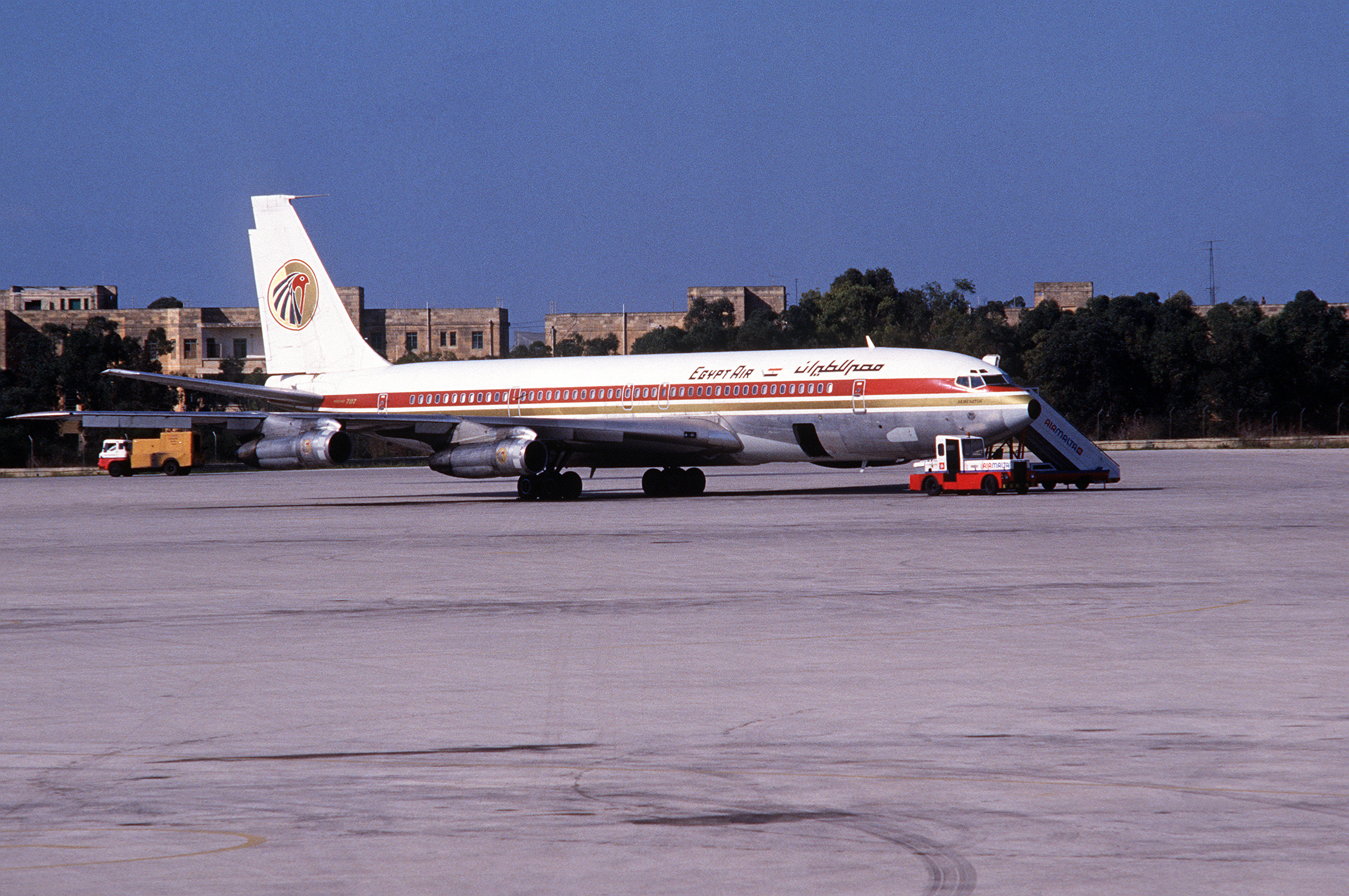
EgyptAir Boeing 707 at Malta International Airport in 1985

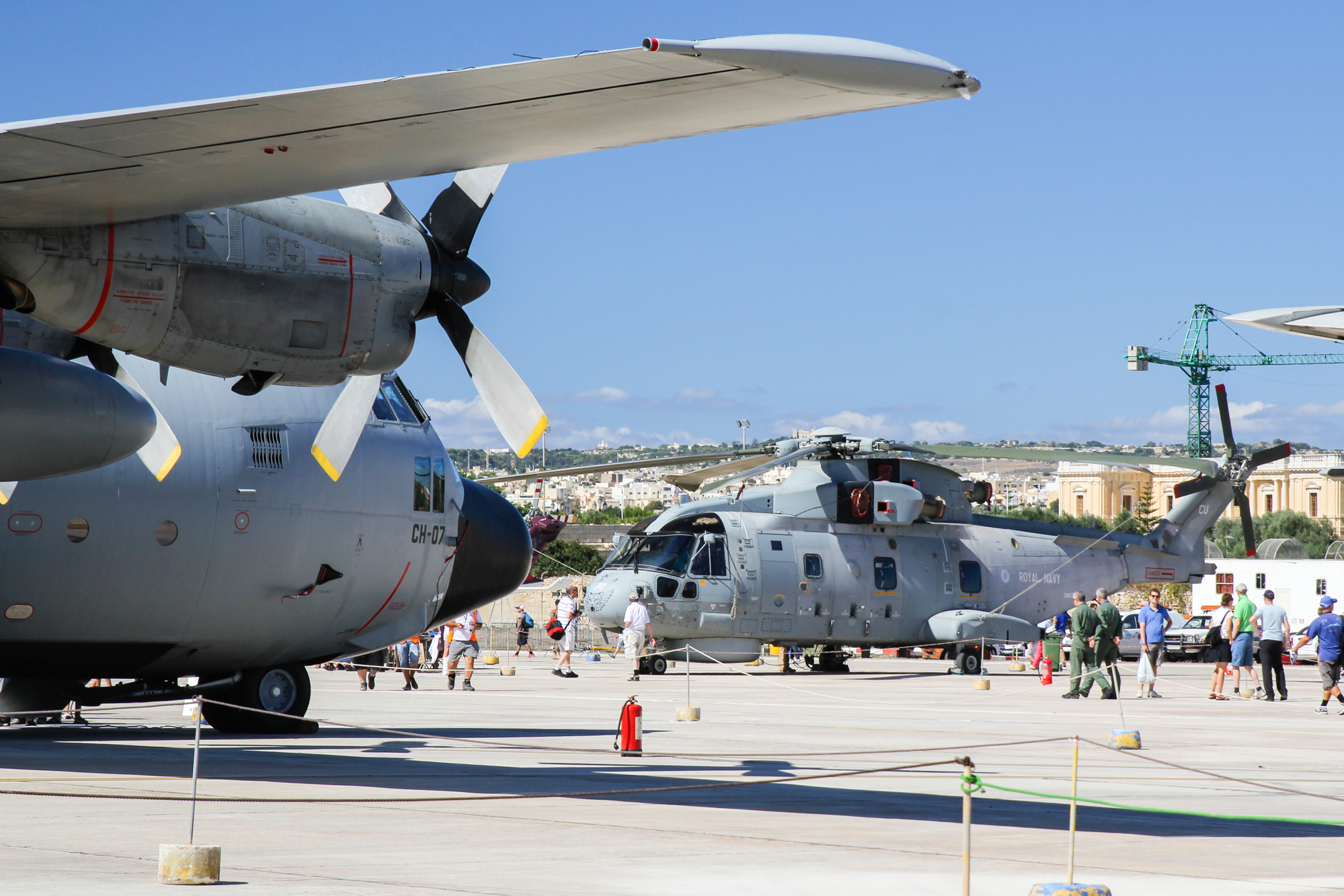
Belgian C-130H and Royal Navy Merlin HM.2 at the 2015 Malta International Airshow. The airport has hosted the event since the 1990s.

=== Busiest routes (by country) ===
Busiest international routes out of Malta International Airport by country (2024)
Rank	Country	Passenger Movements	% Change (vs 2023)
1	Italy	2,046,820	▲7.39
2	United Kingdom	1,741,377	▲24.22
3	Germany	765,115	▲10.27
4	France	627,992	▼2.67
5	Poland	577,959	▲52.82
6	Spain	428,248	▲15.43
7	Greece	248,589	▲26.55
8	Belgium	239,226	▲28.65
9	Switzerland	224,070	▲14.37
10	Austria	220,192	▲19.11

=== Busiest airlines ===
Top 10 passenger airlines out of Malta International Airport (2016)
Rank	Airline	Passengers	% Change (vs 2015)
1	Ryanair	1,731,881	▲41.30
2	Air Malta	1,600,408	▼7.47
3	EasyJet	279,266	▼15.75
4	Lufthansa	230,965	▲7.21
5	Wizz Air	177,420	▲17.33
6	Turkish Airlines	132,521	▲11.98
7	Alitalia	111,504	▲24.91
8	Emirates	88,329	▼3.45
9	British Airways	80,024	▼0.97
10	Vueling	73,131	▼8.28

== Ground transportation ==
=== Bus ===
Malta International Airport is served also by several buses operated by private transportation groups and public transport operated by Malta Public Transport. Malta Public Transport buses serve the airport, including four Tallinja Direct routes, originating and terminating at the airport. A mixture of Express and local services are available. Now there are direct tallinja buses like TD1, TD2, TD3, TD4, TD5 which operate from Malta Airport to major hubs like Tas-Sliema, Valletta and San Pawl il-Bahar.

=== Car ===
The airport is located 5 km (3.1 mi) southwest of the capital, Valletta.

== Accidents and incidents ==
- On 5 January 1960, Vickers Viscount G-AMNY of British European Airways was damaged beyond economic repair at Luqa when it departed the runway after landing following a loss of hydraulic pressure.
- On 25 November 1973, Luqa Airport witnessed the landing of KLM Flight 861. The aircraft, named "Mississippi", was a Boeing 747 hijacked by three young Arabs over Iraqi airspace on a scheduled Amsterdam-Tokyo flight with 247 passengers on board, after the hijackers threatened to blow up the plane when no country would grant landing permission. Most of the passengers and the eight stewardesses were released after negotiations with the Maltese Prime Minister Dom Mintoff, who argued with the hijackers that the plane could not possibly take off with both the passengers and the 27,000 gallons of fuel they had demanded, given the (then) short runway. With 11 passengers on board the jumbo jet left Malta to Dubai, where the incident ended without fatalities. The hijack was claimed by the Arab Nationalist Youth Organization.
- On 23 November 1985, Luqa Airport was the scene of one of the deadliest aircraft hijackings in aviation history before the September 11 attacks. EgyptAir Flight 648 was forced to land in Malta en route to Libya. Unit 777 of the Egyptian counter-terrorism forces was dispatched to deal with the incident. Storming of the Boeing 737, reluctantly authorised by Maltese officials after five hostages were shot, resulted in the death of over 60 passengers plus several security personnel and aircrew as well as the hijackers, members of the Abu Nidal Organization.
- Abdelbaset al-Megrahi was convicted for the 1988 Lockerbie bombing on the theory that he loaded a bomb onto Air Malta Flight KM180 Malta-Frankfurt at Luqa Airport which it is alleged found its way via the interline baggage system onto Pan Am Feeder Flight 103A Frankfurt-London and eventually onto Pan Am Flight 103 London-New York. In August 2009, al-Megrahi was released from Greenock Prison on compassionate grounds prior to returning to Tripoli, Libya for the final three years before his death in May 2012.
- MLA was the origin airport of the Air Malta Flight 830 Malta-Istanbul hijack which ended at Cologne Bonn Airport.
- On 21 February 2011, two Libyan fighter pilots, both claiming to be colonels, defected and landed their Mirage F1 jets at the airport after refusing to carry out orders to fire upon a group of civilian Libyan protesters in Tripoli. On the same day two Eurocopter Super Puma helicopters registered in France also landed carrying seven French nationals who were under Italian contracts to work in Libya.
- On 24 October 2016, a CAE Aviation Fairchild Merlin twin turboprop crashed on take-off a short distance from the runway. All five people on board were killed. The aircraft was taking part in a French-led surveillance operation to counter people smuggling.
- On 23 December 2016, Afriqiyah Airways Flight 209, operated by an Airbus A320-214, was hijacked while en route from Sabha Airport to Tripoli International Airport in Libya. The hijackers demanded the pilots to fly to Malta.
