= Michelangelo Sapiano =

Maltese clock maker and inventor

Michelangelo Sapiano (March 19, 1826 – December 2, 1912) was a Maltese clock maker and inventor born in Mqabba, Malta.

== Early life ==
Michelangelo Sapiano was born in Mqabba in 1826, the son of Baskal and Tereża née Agius. When he was 14 years of age he opened a watch repair shop and at such a young age he managed to repair the Parish Church clock at Mqabba. Sapiano learned how to be a horologist from Giananton Tanti of Marsa, who was also a skilled blacksmith. Tanti's clocks include those at the parish churches of Qrendi and Tarxien.

He left Mqabba for Luqa when he was 21 years old, soon after he married Mikelina Mifsud in 1847. His wife died a few years later and in 1857 married Marianna Mifsud, who was Mikelina's sister.

== Achievements ==
Sapiano is best known for large clocks that were built for churches, convents and sacristies in various towns and villages in Malta and Gozo. He also known for a large clock he made for the Church of Saint Catherine of Alexandria in Egypt.

His masterpiece is a grandfather clock which till a few years ago could be found in No.11, Pawlu Magri Street, Luqa, which is the house where Sapiano used to live as a married man. The clock can now be found in the Mdina Cathedral Museum. For this clock he was awarded the Silver Medal in the Maltese Industry Exhibition of 1864. Apart from showing the time, days and date this clock also shows the phases of the moon and the time at which the sun rises and goes down. This clock also has a mechanism which marks when a year is a leap year.

Sapiano made other precision instruments, including a weighing machine for the Malta Customs, which could take weights from 700 lbs down to a fraction of an ounce. For his wife he made a mechanical egg timer with a bell, and to know the time at night he devised a mantel clock to which a long string was attached which would chime the most recent time when pulled in the darkness.

Sapiano was awarded the gold medal by the Society of Arts, Manufacture and Commerce on the 26 February 1908.

He died on 2 December 1912.
