= Malta Air =

Low-cost airline of Malta

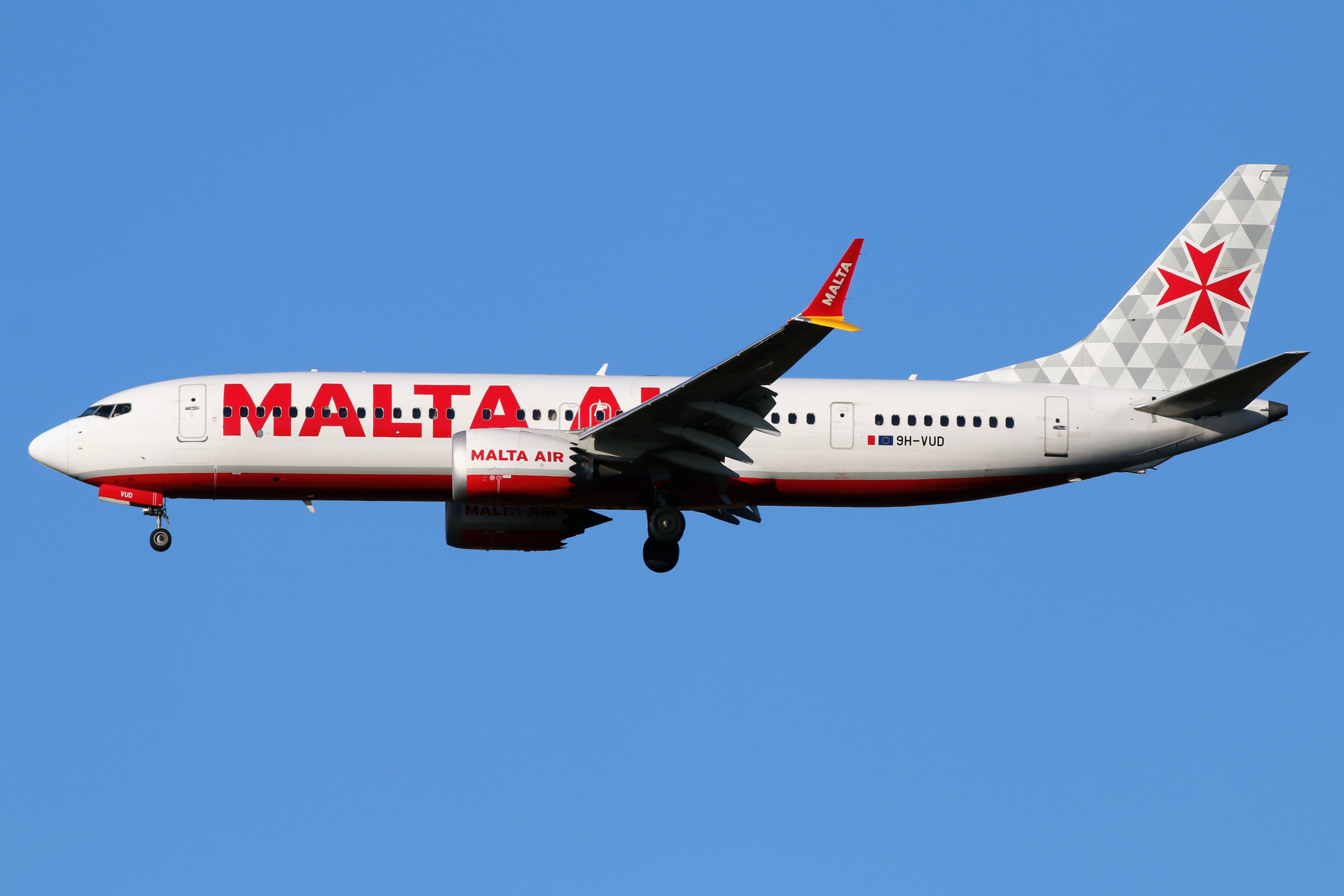
- Malta Air Boeing 737 MAX 200 in the airline's own livery
IATA	ICAO	Call sign
MW	MAY	BLUE MED
- Founded: 9 June 2019; 7 years ago
- AOC #: MT-57
- Operating bases: Malta; Milan–Malpensa
- Fleet size: 179
- Parent company: Ryanair Holdings
- Headquarters: Pietà, Malta
- Key people: David O’Brien (CEO)

Malta Air is a low-cost airline that operates from Malta. A wholly owned subsidiary of Ryanair Holdings, the airline operates scheduled flights on behalf of Ryanair.

Founded in 2019, the airline originally started as a joint venture between Ryanair and the Government of Malta. Over the following years, Ryanair significantly expanded the subsidiary's footprint by transferring multiple aircraft and continental European bases to the Maltese air operator certificate. In 2025, Ryanair acquired full ownership of the airline after purchasing the Maltese government's remaining share.

== History ==
On 9 June 2019, Ryanair announced together with the Government of Malta that they were to set up a subsidiary airline called Malta Air which was to consist of an initial fleet of 6 aircraft and operate the existing 61 flights operated by Ryanair from the island. The fleet was to be registered in Malta while a new repair and maintenance hangar was also to be set up. Ryanair was to transfer all its existing Maltese operations to the new airline with its fleet increasing from 6 to 10 Boeing 737-800 aircraft and all in Malta Air colours by mid 2020.

News aggregator Corporate Dispatch reported the first sighting of a Ryanair aircraft displaying an "operated by Malta Air" sticker just outside its front passenger door on 20 June 2019 at Stansted Airport. By late September 2019, further reports of Malta Air branding on Ryanair flights were being reported, including safety cards on the back of all passenger seats, as well as flight attendant and cockpit announcements, even though no further official notice of this was circulated to the general public.

When faced with the COVID-19 pandemic in May 2020, Malta Air announced substantial redundancies for its pilots and cabin crew, after first proposing a 10% salary cut. Around 20 pilots and 40 cabin crew from the full complement of 179 pilots and cabin crew had their employment terminated from 30 June 2020.

In July 2021, Malta Air received its first Boeing 737 MAX 200. The aircraft, registered as 9H-VUE, was the first in its fleet to be painted in the Malta Air livery. It was also the first aircraft to be delivered directly to Malta Air from the manufacturer, as its previous Boeing 737-800 aircraft had been transferred from its parent, Ryanair. Five further examples of the type were delivered in Malta Air livery between July and August 2021, though the remainder of its 737 MAX 200 fleet wears Ryanair livery in order to facilitate transfers between different group AOCs.

In June 2024, five years after the airline's inception, Ryanair took over the Maltese government's golden share in Malta Air for the pre-agreed sum of €25,000. The buyout for finalised in May 2025.

== Destinations ==
Following its launch, Malta Air took over Ryanair's existing network of over 60 routes at Malta International Airport, which connected the island to Europe and North Africa.

As Ryanair shifted more of its continental European operations to the Maltese certificate, Malta Air assumed control of numerous bases outside Malta, operating scheduled flights on behalf of its parent company.

== Fleet ==
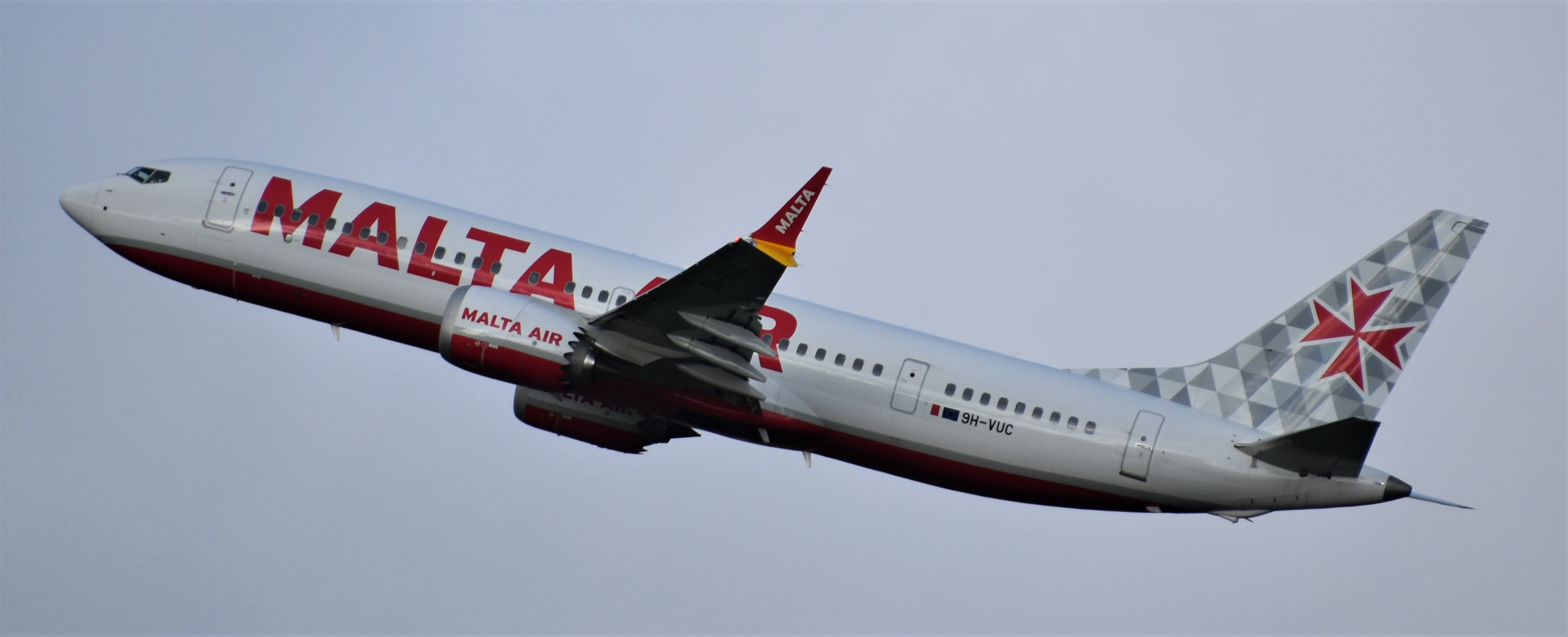
Malta Air Boeing 737 MAX 200

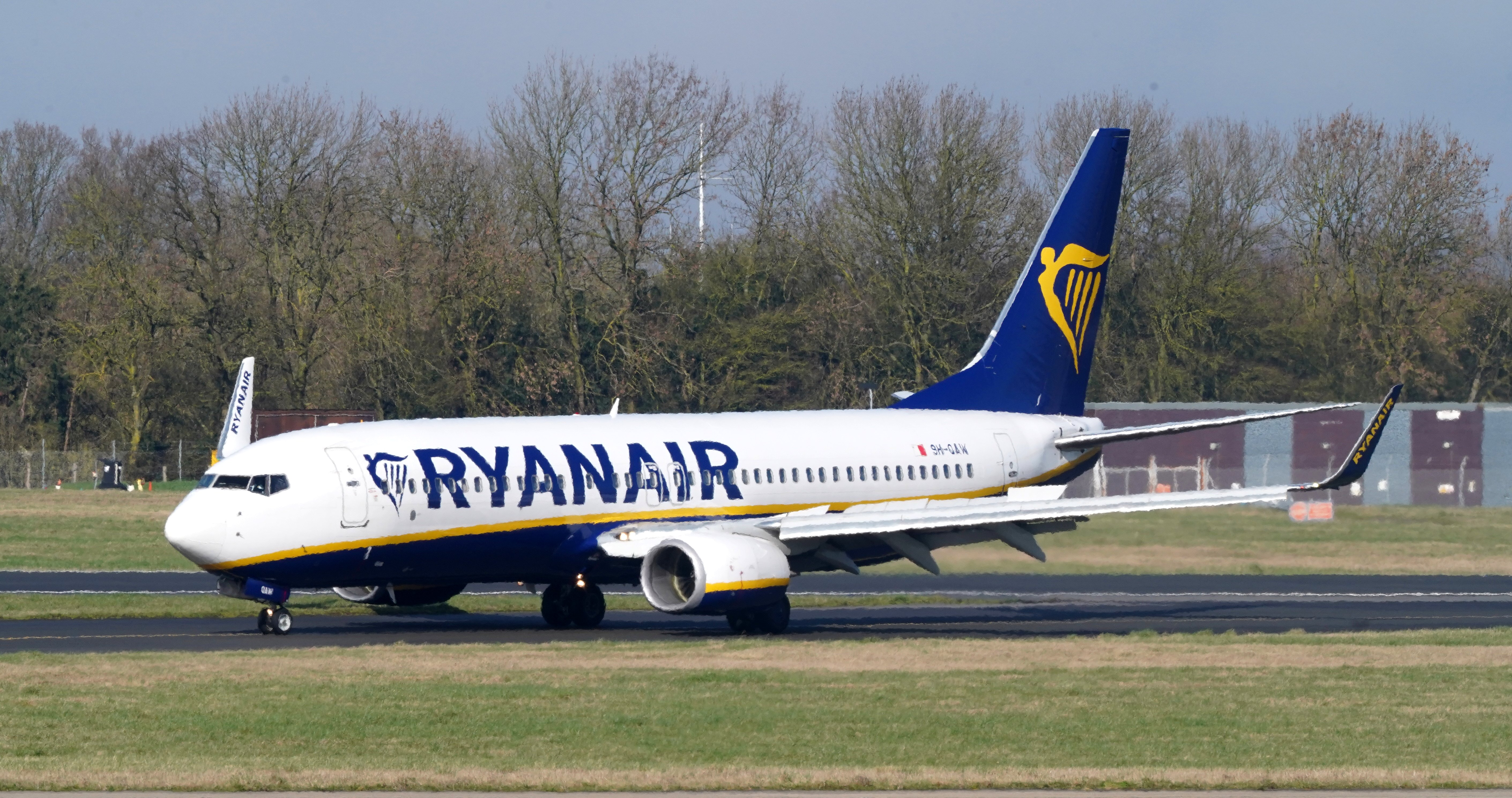
Malta Air Boeing 737-800 in Ryanair livery

=== Current fleet ===
As of July 2026, Malta Air operates the following aircraft:

Malta Air fleet
Aircraft	In service	Orders	Passengers	Notes
Boeing 737-800	136	—	189	Transferred from Ryanair and Buzz.
Boeing 737 MAX 200	43	—	197	8 were originally due for delivery to Ryanair.
Total	179	—		

=== Former fleet ===
As of August 2025, Malta Air operated 136 Boeing 737-800 and 43 Boeing 737-8 MAX.

== Accidents and incidents ==
- On 10 July 2026, Ryanair Flight 1879, a Boeing 737-800 operated by Malta Air flying from Thessaloniki to Memmingen, suffered an uncontained engine failure in which debris destroyed a cabin window, causing a rapid decompression and a 61-year-old passenger to be partially ejected from the cabin. The passenger was restrained by his wife, and the aircraft made an emergency return to Thessaloniki Airport, where he was admitted to hospital.
