= Ċettina Darmenia Brincat =

Maltese businesswoman and politician (1931–2023)

Ċettina Darmenia Brincat (10 January 1931 – 5 October 2023) was a Maltese businesswoman and politician. She was a Member of the Parliament of Malta between 1982 and 1987.

== Biography ==
Darmenia Brincat was born in Luqa, Malta. She studied French and History at the University of Grenoble (Grenoble Alpes University) in France and was fluent in both French and Maltese.

Darmenia Brincat worked in the tourism industry, running her travel agency Darmenia Tours which organised pilgrimages abroad.

At the 1981 Maltese general election, Darmenia Brincat was elected as a Member of the Parliament of Malta in the Fifth Legislature (1982–1987), for the 7th district and with the Labour Party of Malta. She was the seventh Maltese woman to serve as an MP. After unsuccessful contesting the 1987 Maltese general election, Darmenia Brincat retired from politics and continued operating her travel business.

Darmenia Brincat was married to Lawrence Darmenia, who died in 2008. She died on 5 October 2023, aged 92.
