= St Andrew's Parish Church, Luqa =

Parish Church of St Andrew
- Il-Knisja Parrokkjali ta Sant' Andrija
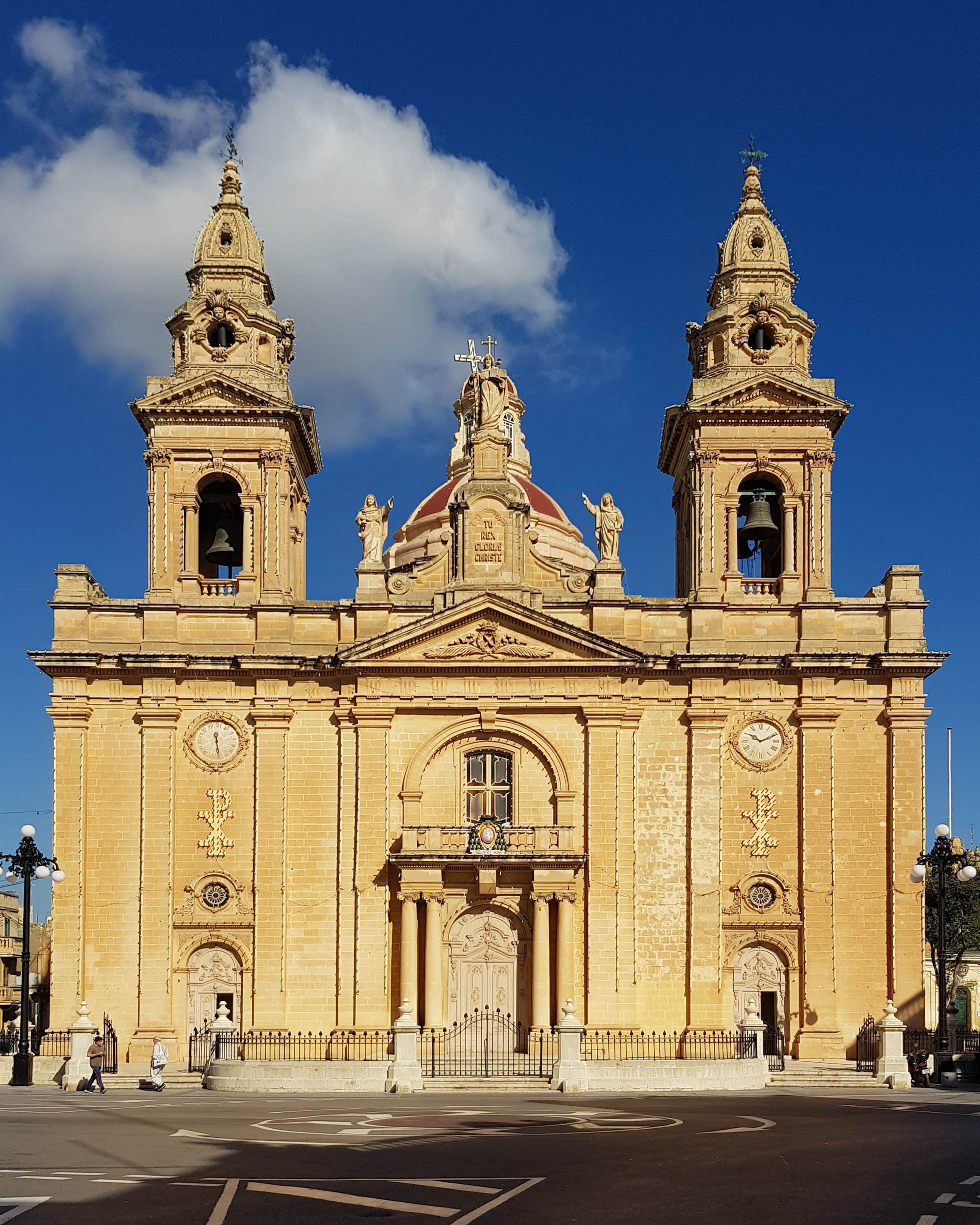
- The church's façade in 2018
- Parish Church of St Andrew
- 35°51′37.4″N 14°29′19.8″E
- Location: Luqa, Malta
- Denomination: Roman Catholic
- Website: Website of the Church

History
- Status: Active
- Founded: 15 May 1634
- Dedication: St Andrew
- Consecrated: 7 December 1783
- Events: Saint Andrew's Festa (1st Sunday of July), Our Lady of Consolation's Festa (4 September), Good Friday Procession, Easter Sunday Procession, Chorpus Christie and the Sacred Heart of Jesus Procession and Our Lady of Rosary Procession.

Architecture
- Functional status: Parish church
- Architect(s): Giulju Muscat (main) and Andrea Micallef (copula and extensions)
- Architectural type: Church
- Style: Mannerist (exterior); Baroque (interior)

Specifications
- Materials: Limestone

Administration
- Archdiocese: Malta
- Parish: Luqa

Clergy
- Rector: Kan. Michael Zammit

The Parish Church of St Andrew is a Roman Catholic parish church located in Luqa, Malta.

== Early times ==
The church of St Andrew of Luqa was first mentioned towards the end of the 15th century. The first building may not have been in a good state, since a new one was built between 1539 and 1542.

== Dusina's apostolic visit ==
In 1575, the Apostolic visitor Pietro Dusina reports that in that year the church of St Andrew was the main church of the village though it had no priest to administer the sacraments. Moreover, Dusina reports that the high altar had no titular painting. Consequently, he ordered that one be painted and installed. Dusina's report also mentions that the church had two side altars dedicated to Christ the Saviour and Our Lady. The painting of Christ the Saviour depicted Christ in his transfiguration together with Paul the Apostle, Saint Roch and Saint Sebastian. Dusina also reports that the altar of Our Lady did not have a painting though that same year one was commissioned that depicted the Nativity of Mary but which later was changed into the Nativity of Jesus. In 1600 the titular painting of the church was mentioned for the first time. It was done by Filippo Dingli and depicted Our Lady with St Andrew and St Paul. In 1607 Mass began to be celebrated daily in this church.

== Separate parish ==
In 1634 Luqa became a separate parish from Bir Miftuh and Reverend Agostino Cassia was installed as the first parish priest. Also, in 1634 it was decided to build a new parish church and construction started the same year on the site where there were three chapels dedicated to St Julian, St Anthony of Egypt and the Visitation respectively. The church was designed by Reverend Gulju Muscat.

== Present church ==
The present church was inspired by the Co-Cathedral in Valletta with a Mannerist architecture on the exterior and a baroque architecture on the interior. It was built on the designs of Dun Giulju Muscat. Its construction started in 1634 and completed in 1635.

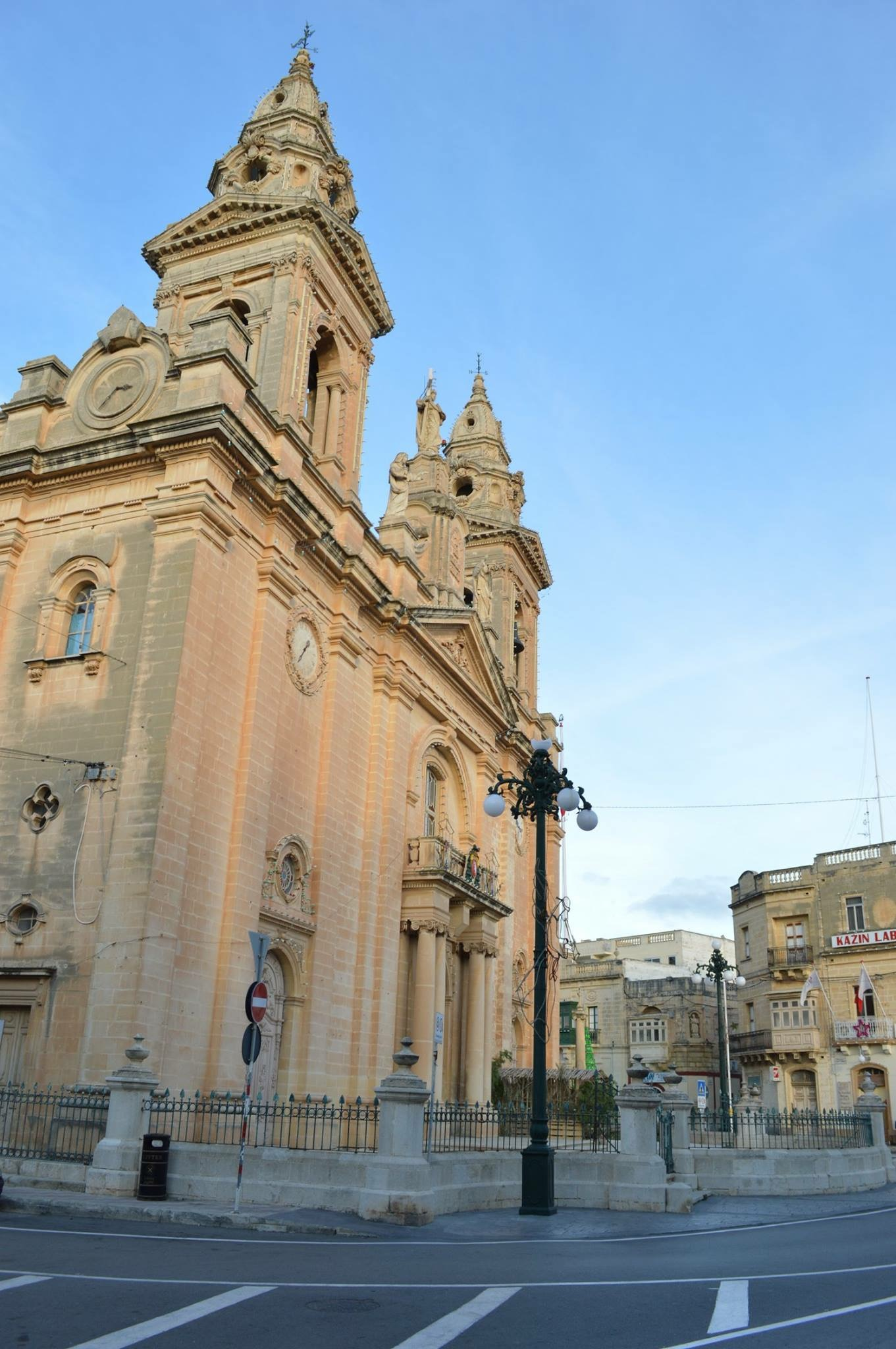

It is recorded that on 9 November 1636, Bishop Balaguer visited the church and administered the sacrament of Confirmation for the first time in this church. During that day Bishop Balaguer encouraged the people of Luqa to work hard in order to build the new parish church. In 1643 a new titular painting of St Andrew, done by Ludovico La Sala, was installed in the church.

By 1644 the choir, two chapels, the dome and part of the transept were finished. During that year it is recorded that Bishop Balaguer made a pastoral visit to the parish of Luqa. In 1654 the first altar in the transept, dedicated to St Luke, was finished. Luqa derives its name from St Luke (San Luqa in Maltese). In 1655 Stefano Erardi painted the Nativity of Jesus. In 1665 the church building was nearly completed though it still lacked sculptured stone and the bell towers. In 1667 the organ was installed in the new parish church. The church of St Andrew also acquired a painting of the Assumption by Mattia Preti in 1669 and a new titular painting depicting St Andrew's martyrdom in 1687 by the same artist.

In 1691 the choir of the church of St Andrew was given a baroque style look. Works were carried out by Giuseppe Casanova the following year. In 1699 two bell towers were built on designs by Lorenzo Gafà. In 1757 the pulpit of the church was finished. It was carved in wood by Pietru Saliba. In 1779 the titular statue of St Andrew was sculpted in wood by Giuseppe Scolaro. On 7 December 1783 the new parish church was consecrated by Bishop Vincenzo Labini. In 1785 Bishop Labini ordered that a set of Stations of the Cross should be installed in the church. Moreover, the same bishop commissioned a new organ for the church which was brought from Naples in 1792. In 1813 four new statues were built outside the church in a time when the village was infected with the plague. Between 1901 and 1910 the church was further enlarged, but was nearly completely destroyed by enemy bombing during World War II considering the fact that it is so close to the airport. It was rebuilt between 1945 and 1954 and re-consecrated by Archbishop Gonzi on 26 September 1962. The extension of the church and the rebuilding of the copula are of the design by Andrea Micallef. Following the direct hit during the war, some people kept ruins from the church in their private possessions.

The church is listed on the National Inventory of the Cultural Property of the Maltese Islands.
