= Medavia =

Maltese airline

IATA	ICAO	Call sign
5M	MDM	MEDAVIA
- Founded: 1978
- Ceased operations: February 2021
- Hubs: Malta International Airport
- Fleet size: 6
- Headquarters: Safi Aviation Park, Malta
- Key people: Mohamed Dau Managing Director
- Website: medavia.com

Mediterranean Aviation Company Limited, doing business as Medavia, is an Aviation Service Provider with its head office and base of operations at Safi Aviation Park, Carmelo Caruana Road, Safi, Malta. Current services include Part 145 Maintenance and Repair, Aircraft Charter Brokerage, Aircraft Operations, Ground Handling, CAMO, as well as Part 21J Design Engineering.

== History ==
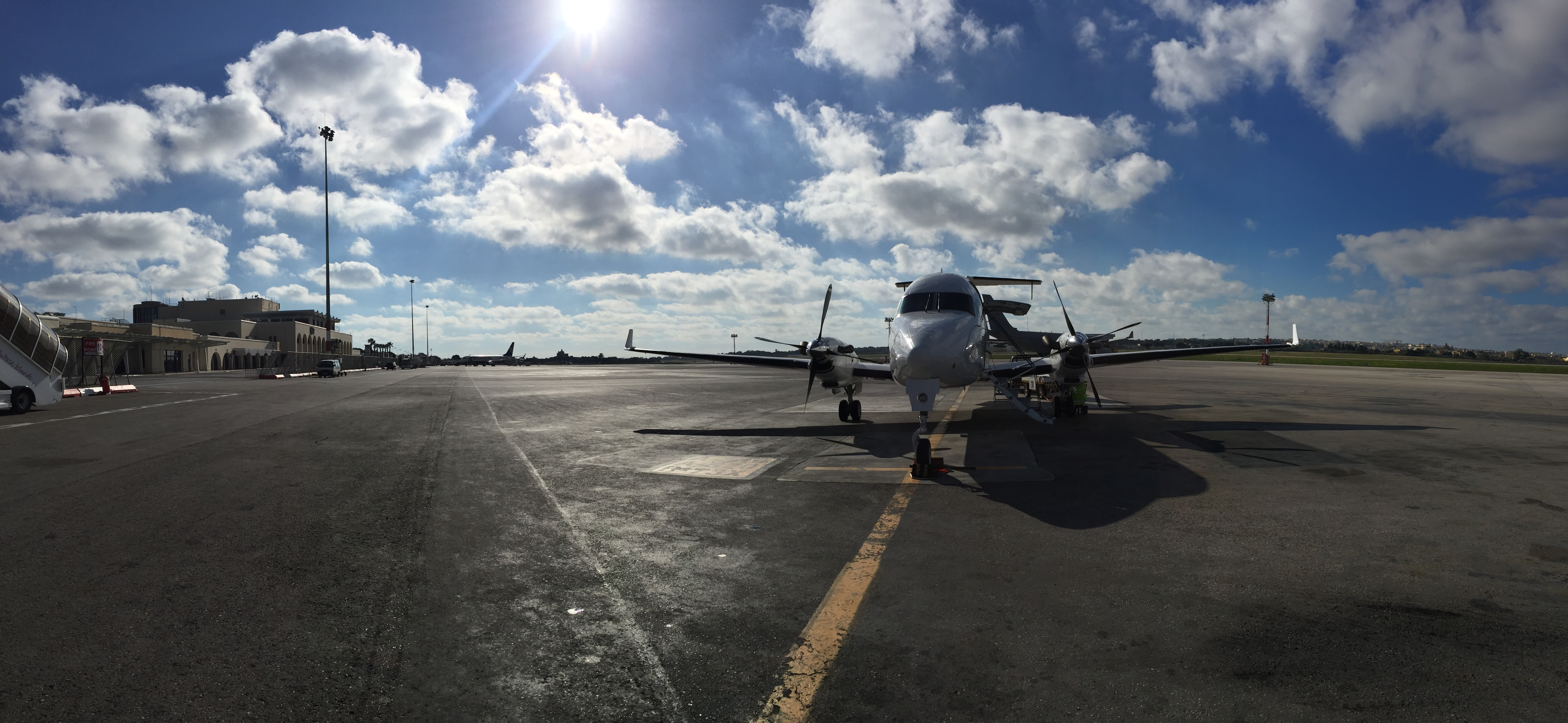
Medavia Beechcraft 1900D

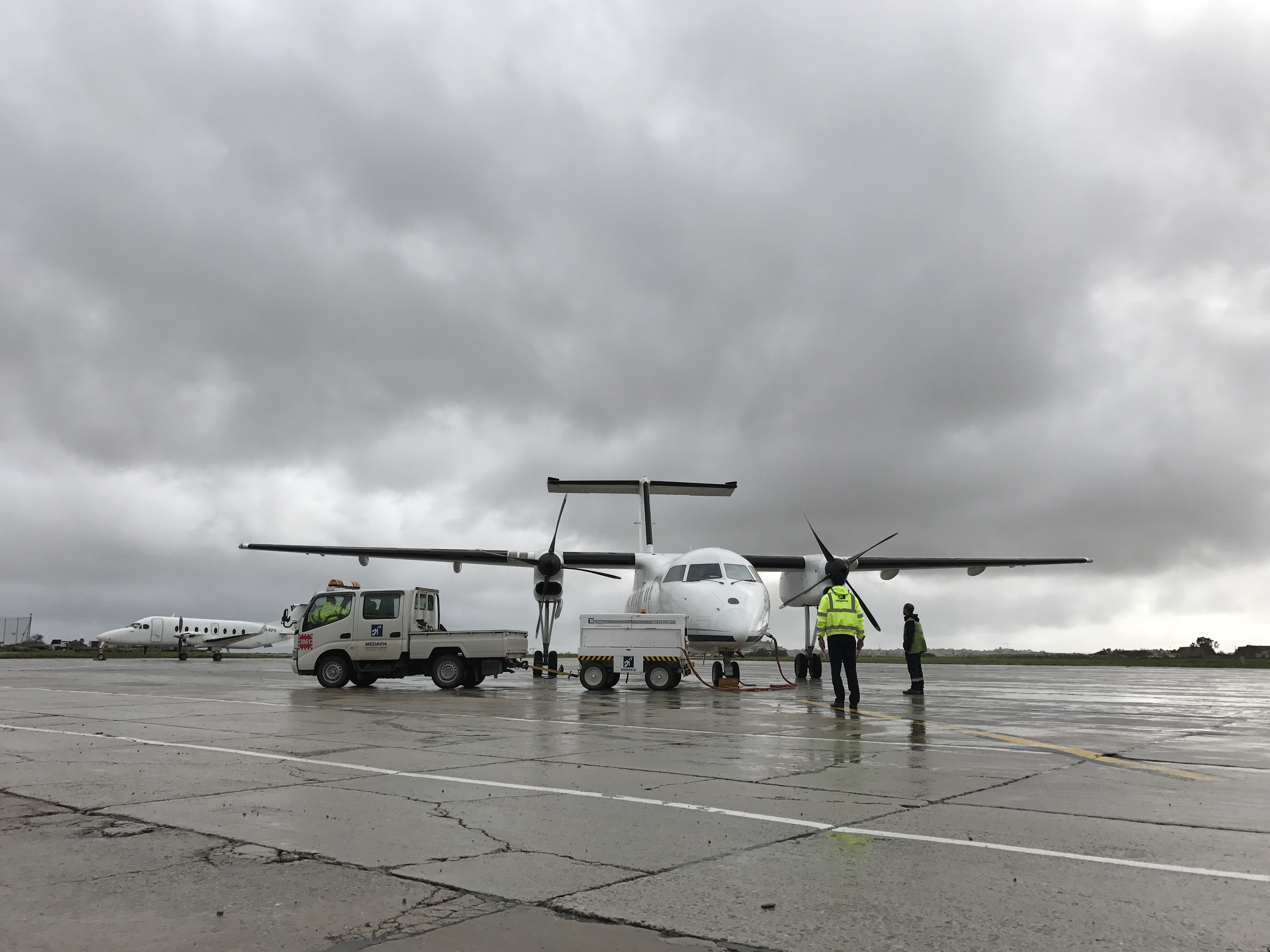
Medavia Dash-8 102

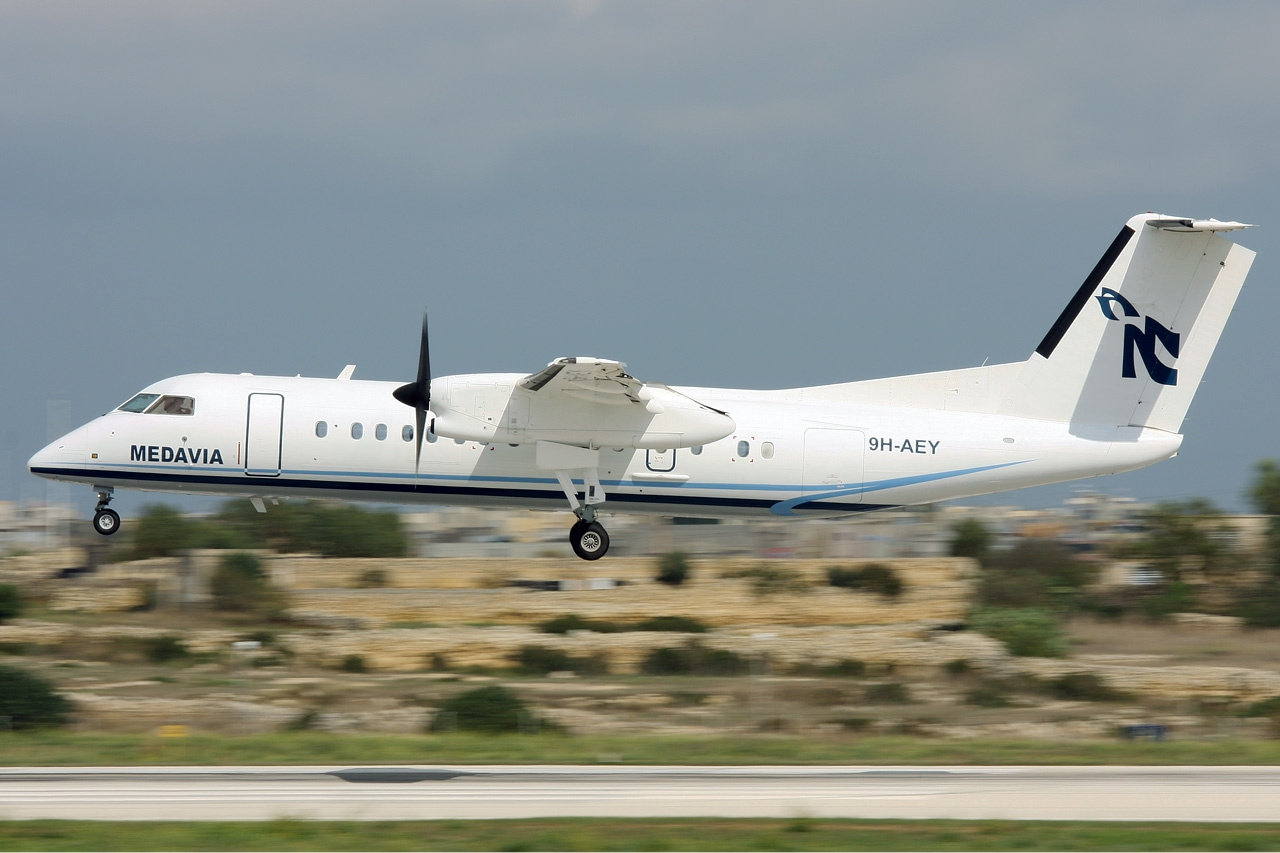
Medavia De Havilland Dash 8

The airline is a Maltese-registered company founded in 1978. It started operations in September 1979. The organisation is an internationally accredited enterprise that offers a range of aviation services namely flight operations charters with its own fleet, aircraft maintenance services and business charter brokerage. Medavia had around 170 employees as of 2007.

In late December 2012, two Medavia officials were detained in Libya in the wake of the Libyan civil war over allegations that they supported the Gaddafi regime. The allegations conflicted with other claims that they had actively supported anti-Gaddafi rebels instead, and many Libyan expats in Malta protested the detentions. The officials were ultimately released without charges in the first week of 2013. Medavia flights served as evacuation channels for Maltese nationals and injured people in the weeks following the commencement of the battle. Medavia was the only airline with flights from Libya direct to Europe, after plans for Libyan airline Ghadames Air Transport to begin Libya-Malta routes fell through. In 2014, a Medavia aircraft was damaged by unrest in Tripoli, which coalesced in the Battle of Tripoli Airport. In February 2021, Medavia was rebranded Mel Air

== Destinations ==
Medavia currently offers flights to Libya, flying regularly to airports such as Mitiga and Misrata. It offers regular and ad hoc charters and long-term leases as well as ACMI operations, including CRJ-1000 operations for Binter Canarias. It previously operated regular services to destinations in Italy, Croatia and Greece besides its regular flights to Libya.

== Fleet ==
As of July 2026, Mel Air operates the following aircraft:

Aircraft	In service	Orders	Passengers
ATR 72-600	5	--	
Beechcraft 1900D	1	--	19
Total:	6		

=== Former fleet ===
The Medavia fleet consisted of the following aircraft (as of June 2022): 1 Bombardier Dash 8-Q300 and 3 Beechcraft 1900D.

The Medavia fleet previously also included the following aircraft (as of March 2008):

- 1 further Bombardier Dash 8 311 Series.
- 3 CASA C-212 Aviocar
