= Ryanair =

Ultra-low-cost airline of Ireland

Ryanair Holdings plc

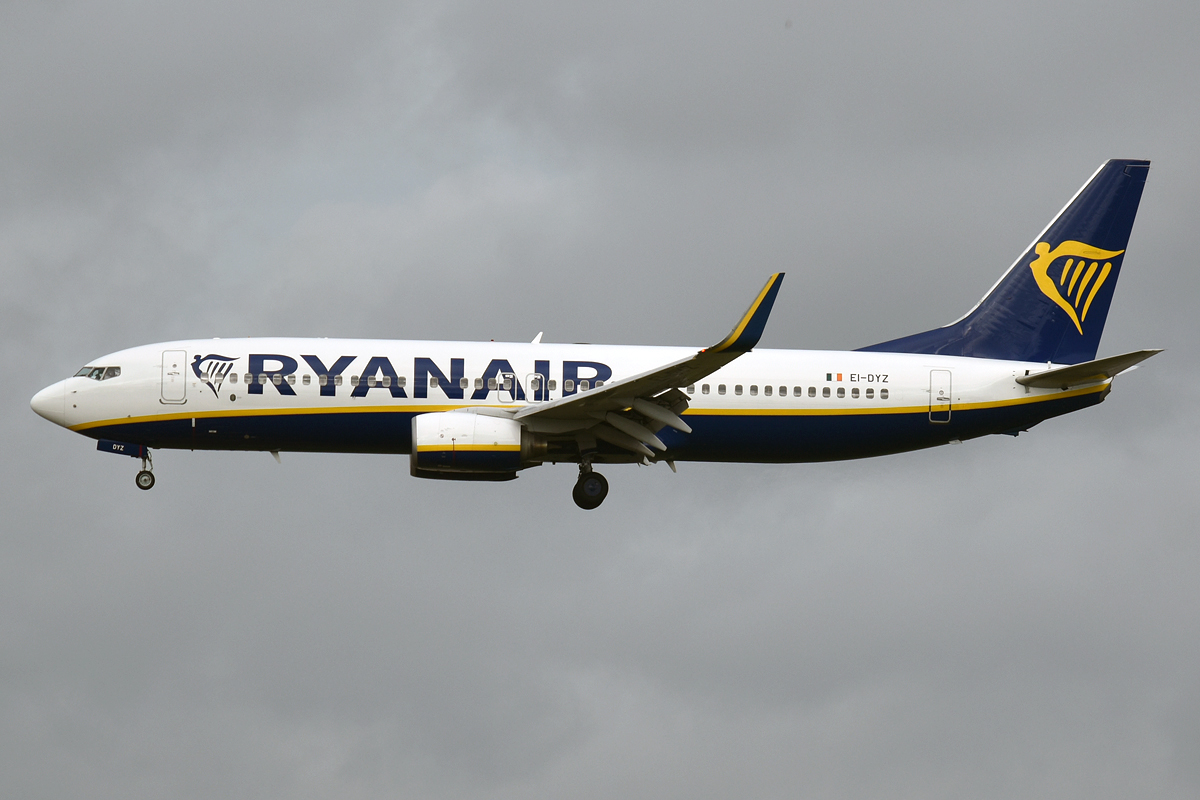
- A Ryanair Boeing 737-800
- Founded: 28 November 1984; 41 years ago
- Commenced operations: 8 July 1985; 41 years ago
- Operating bases: List of bases: Agadir; Alicante; Athens; Barcelona; Bari; Beauvais; Belfast–International; Bergamo; Birmingham; Bologna; Bournemouth; Bratislava; Brindisi; Bristol; Bucharest–Otopeni; Budapest; Cagliari; Catania; Chania; Charleroi; Cologne/Bonn; Copenhagen; Corfu; Cork; Dublin (headquarters); Dubrovnik; East Midlands; Edinburgh; Faro; Fes; Gdańsk; Girona; Glasgow–Prestwick; Gothenburg; Hahn; Ibiza; Karlsruhe/Baden-Baden; Katowice; Kaunas; Kraków; Lamezia Terme; Leeds/Bradford; Lisbon; Liverpool; London–Luton; London–Stansted (largest base); Madrid; Málaga; Malta; Manchester; Marrakesh; Marseille; Memmingen; Milan–Malpensa; Naples; Newcastle upon Tyne; Nuremberg; Palermo; Palma de Mallorca; Paphos; Pisa; Pescara; Poznań; Prague; Porto; Rabat; Reggio Calabria; Rhodes; Riga; Rome–Ciampino; Rome–Fiumicino; Shannon; Seville; Santiago de Compostela; Sofia; Stockholm–Arlanda; Tangier; Tenerife–South; Tirana; Toulouse; Trapani; Treviso; Trieste; Turin; Valencia; Vienna; Venice; Vilnius; Warsaw–Modlin; Wrocław; Weeze; Zadar; Zagreb
- Subsidiaries: Ryanair DAC; Malta Air; Buzz; Lauda Europe; Ryanair UK
- Fleet size: 651
- Destinations: 235
- Traded as: Euronext Dublin: RYA; Nasdaq: RYAAY; ISEQ 20 component
- Headquarters: Swords, County Dublin, Ireland
- Key people: Stan McCarthy (chairman); Michael O'Leary (group CEO)
- Revenue: ▲€13.9 billion (2025)
- Operating income: ▼€1.5 billion (2025)
- Net income: ▼€1.6 billion (2025)
- Total assets: ▲€17.5 billion (2025)
- Total equity: ▼€7 billion (2025)
- Employees: 25,952 (2025)
- Website: www.ryanair.com

Ryanair DAC
| IATA | ICAO | Call sign |
|---|---|---|
| FR | RYR | RYANAIR |
- Founded: 28 November 1984; 41 years ago
- Commenced operations: 8 July 1985; 41 years ago
- Parent company: Ryanair Holdings PLC
- Headquarters: Swords, County Dublin, Ireland
- Key people: Eddie Wilson (Ryanair DAC CEO)
- Founders: Christopher Ryan; Tony Ryan; Declan Ryan; Liam Lonergan

Ryanair is an Irish ultra-low-cost airline headquartered in Swords, County Dublin, Ireland. It is the largest airline in Europe by scheduled passengers carried, fleet size, and total flights. Globally, it is the largest airline by international passengers carried, the third-largest by market capitalisation behind Delta Air Lines and United Airlines, and the fifth-most profitable by net income. In 2025, the company sold 208 million airline tickets, averaging €70 in total revenue against €62 in costs per ticket sold. It is widely considered to be the cheapest airline operating in Europe.

The airline was founded in 1984 by Christopher Ryan and Tony Ryan, from whom it takes its name. Today, the parent company, Ryanair Holdings plc, operates airline subsidiaries Ryanair DAC, Buzz, Malta Air, Lauda Europe, and Ryanair UK. Combined, the group manages a fleet of 651 aircraft and operates over 3,500 short-haul flights per day, serving approximately 230 airports in 36 countries. (Note: Ryanair officially reports 36 countries by including Switzerland via EuroAirport Basel-Mulhouse-Freiburg. Although the airport is physically located entirely in France, the airline classifies it as a Swiss destination.) Its primary operational bases are at Dublin, London Stansted, and Milan Bergamo. To maintain low operating expenses, the company dynamically manages its network, frequently cutting routes or reducing capacity in response to increases in regional airport fees, taxes, or environmental levies.

Ryanair operates an ultra-low-cost, no-frills business model, generating nearly one-third of its income from ancillary revenue by charging additional fees for seat selection, cabin and checked baggage, and airport check-in services. Ryanair is ranked 790th on the Forbes Global 2000 and 280th on the Fortune 500 Europe. Longtime CEO Michael O'Leary, who owns approximately 4% of the company, frequently deliberately stirs media controversy to generate free publicity for the brand. While the airline consistently scores poorly in customer satisfaction metrics, including annual surveys by Which?, the company routinely dismisses these results as statistically unrepresentative, pointing instead to its long-term growth in booking numbers.

== History ==
Ryanair's old logo, used from 2001 to 2013

Ryanair's logo used from November 2013 to July 2015, when a new logo with a white background was introduced. This logo was first revealed in January 2010.

=== 1984–1989 ===
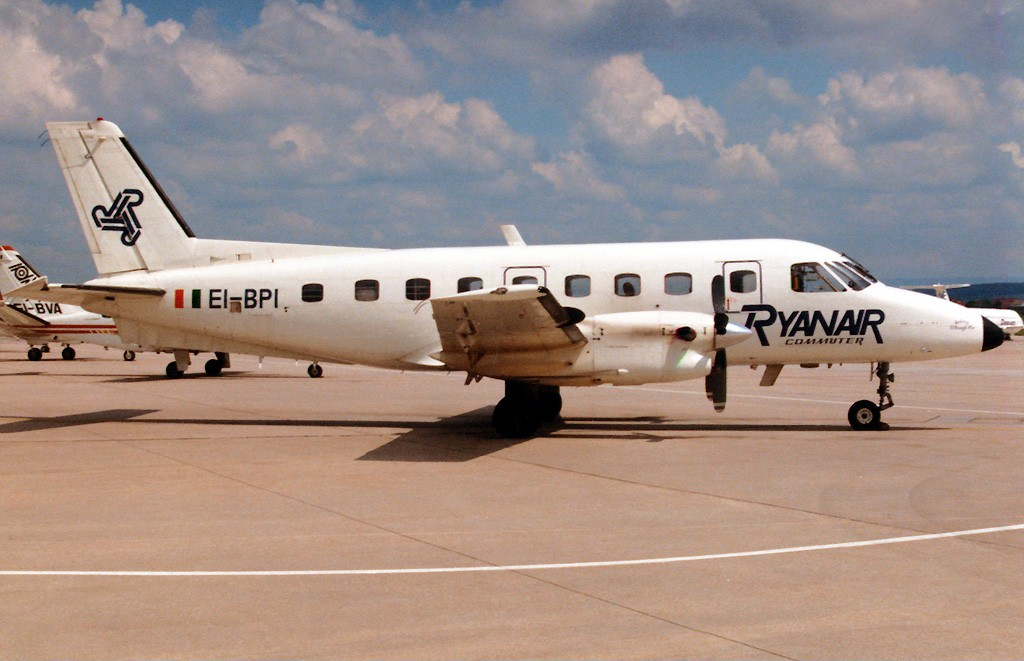
Ryanair Embraer EMB 110 Bandeirante in 1988

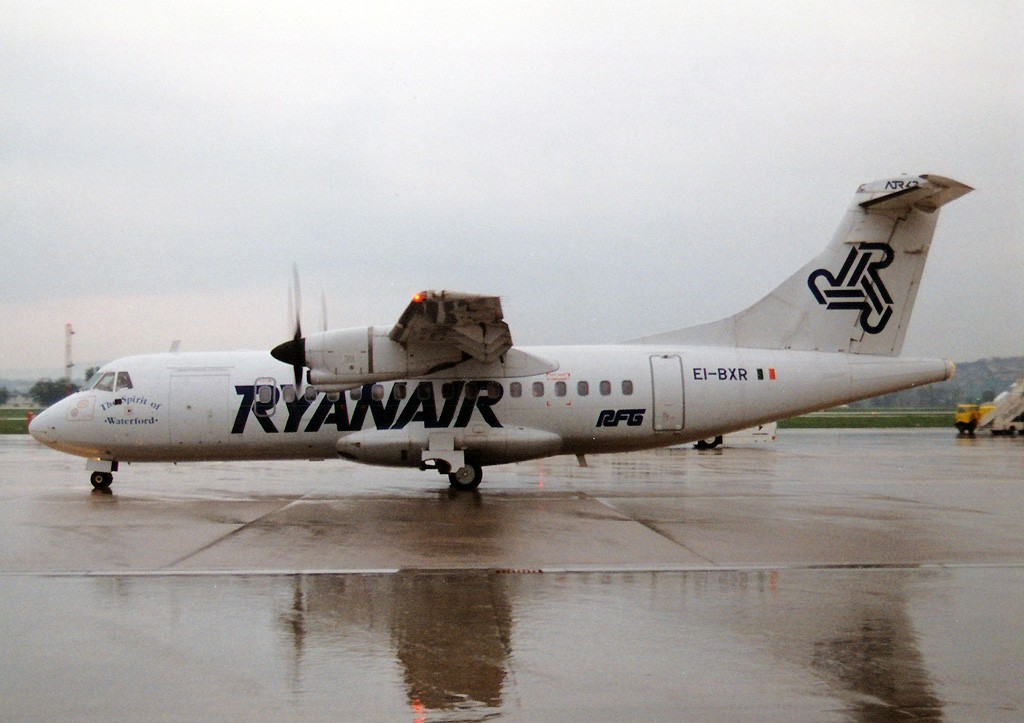
Ryanair ATR 42-300 in 1991

Ryanair was incorporated on 28 November 1984 as Danren Enterprises. It was founded by Christopher Ryan (1936–2007), Tony Ryan (1936–2007) (founder of Guinness Peat Aviation), his son Declan Ryan, and Liam Lonergan (owner of Irish travel agent Club Travel).

The airline was renamed Ryanair and launched its first flight on 8 July 1985, between Waterford and Gatwick Airport, with a 15-seat Embraer EMB 110 Bandeirante turboprop aircraft. Cabin crew were required to be at most 5 ft 2 in (1.57 m) tall "in order to be able to operate in the tiny cabin of the aircraft". As of September 1985, Ryanair was operating 9 weekly flights on the route. In its first year, the airline carried 5,000 passengers.

The first chief executive was Eugene O'Neill (1956–2018), who had formerly worked as managing director of Tony Ryan's Sunday Tribune newspaper and as Ryan's personal assistant. O'Neill was talented at marketing but did not focus on costs, and the airline lost money in its early years. Ryan vetoed O'Neill's proposal to accuse Aer Lingus of breaching competition rules at the European Commission because at the time Aer Lingus was state-owned and Ryanair depended on the Irish government for its route licences. Ryan fired O'Neill in September 1987, who sued for wrongful dismissal.

Beginning in 1986, under partial European Economic Community (EEC) deregulation, airlines could begin new international intra-EEC services as long as one of the two governments approved. The Irish government at the time refused to allow Ryanair to add a route between Dublin and Luton to protect Aer Lingus, but Britain, under Margaret Thatcher's deregulating Conservative government, approved the service. The company was then able to add its second route, with two Hawker Siddeley HS 748s, directly competing with the Aer Lingus/British Airways duopoly for the first time. Ryanair's price of £99 return was half of that of the legacy carriers; Aer Lingus then cut its price to £95 return and Ryanair cut its price to £94.99 return. In their first year of operation, Ryanair's two routes had 82,000 passengers.

In 1986, Ryanair acquired an 85% stake in London European Airways (LEA) in a £630,000 rescue package. It was relaunched in April 1987 using a leased BAC One-Eleven. In May 1987, the service launched routes between Luton and Amsterdam and Brussels. In January 1988, it was rebranded as Ryanair Europe. LEA was dissolved in May 1991.

In 1987, the company lost £3 million. That year, the company began wet leasing BAC One-Elevens from TAROM and increased its network to 15 scheduled routes.

In 1988, Michael O'Leary, formerly an accountant at KPMG who had handled tax preparation for Tony Ryan and his companies and a classmate of Declan Ryan, joined Ryanair first as a financial assistant to Tony Ryan and then as chief financial officer of the company. That year, the company began leasing ATR 42-300s from Guinness Peat Aviation and launched a business class service and frequent-flyer program; they were ended the following year.

In 1989, a Short Sandringham flying boat was painted with Ryanair livery as part of a proposed sponsorship deal with Foynes Flying Boat Museum but never flew revenue-generating services for the airline.

=== 1990–2009 ===
By 1990, the company had accumulated £20 million in losses. That year, O'Leary was dispatched to Dallas to meet with Herb Kelleher, a co-founder of Southwest Airlines and an acquaintance of Tony Ryan. He came back with a plan to transform Ryanair into a low-cost carrier modelled after Southwest. O'Leary's strategy was to adopt a simple all-Boeing 737 fleet, pursue expansion over yield, create a culture of cost-cutting, and re-educate the customer to prefer lower prices to frills. Ryanair implemented a 30-minute turnaround goal to allow aircraft to make more flights per day. The company then restructured with an additional £20 million investment by Tony Ryan. Also that year, the company moved its base from Luton Airport to London Stansted Airport. The company switched to a buy on board programme, the route network was reduced from 19 destinations to 6, and the cheapest ticket prices were reduced from £99 to £59 return. By the end of 1990, the airline was on pace for 745,000 passengers per year.

In 1991, due to a decline in demand during the Gulf War, the airline lowered fares and increased operations at London Stansted Airport, generating a total profit of £293,000 for the year. In 1992, the airline carried 945,000 passengers.

In January 1994, Ryanair took delivery of its first Boeing 737. That month, Michael O'Leary became the sixth chief executive officer of the company. At that time, Ryanair was owned by the three sons of Tony Ryan.

In 1995, Ryanair carried over 2 million passengers.

Ryan clashed with O'Leary, with Ryan wanting the airline's public relations stunts to be less aggressive, and O'Leary suggesting that Ryan should leave the board.

Ryanair Holdings was established in 1996 as a holding company for Ryanair.

The EU Single Aviation Market was established in 1992, as well as the airline deregulation in April 1997 and the removal of cabotage, which gave low-cost carriers, including Ryanair, the opportunity to expand.

The airline became a public company via an initial public offering in May 1997, raising funds on the Dublin and the NASDAQ stock exchanges to expand the company across Europe. All employees received free shares in the IPO; many pilots' shares were worth over £100,000 by 2000. In 1997, Ryanair carried 3.7 million passengers.

In 1998, Ryanair launched services to Stockholm, Sandefjord Airport, Torp, Beauvais–Tillé, and Charleroi.

In May 1999, the Ryan family sold 10.5% of the company, reducing their stake to 17.1% and netting approximately £117 million, and Michael O'Leary sold 1.5% of the company, reducing his stake to 10.8% of the company and netting about £17 million. In 1999, flush with new capital, Ryanair placed a US$2 billion order for 45 new Boeing 737-800 aircraft.

By March 2000, Ryanair operated a total of 33 routes. The airline launched its website in 2000, built by a 17-year-old entrepreneur for IR£20,000. Management thought that the online booking engine would only be a small part of its business. By the end of 2001, 75% of bookings were made online.

In December 2001, competing low-cost airline Go withdrew its service from Dublin due to competition from Ryanair.

In January 2002, the airline ordered 155 new Boeing 737-800 at what was believed to be a substantial discount due to a decline in demand after the September 11 attacks, to be delivered over eight years from 2002 to 2010. Approximately 100 of these aircraft had been delivered by the end of 2005, despite production delays in late 2005 caused by a Boeing machinists' strike.

In June 2002, the High Court of Ireland in Dublin awarded Jane O'Keefe €67,500 in damages and her costs after Ryanair reneged on a prize of free flights for life that she was awarded for being the airline's 1 millionth passenger in 1998.

In 2002, Ryanair refused to provide wheelchairs for disabled passengers at London Stansted Airport, leading to lawsuits. The airline argued that this provision was the responsibility of the airport authority, stating that wheelchairs were provided by 80 of the 84 Ryanair destination airports. A court ruling in 2004 judged that the responsibility should be shared by the airline and the airport owners. Ryanair responded by adding a surcharge of £0.50 to all its flight prices.

In April 2003, Ryanair acquired its ailing competitor Buzz from KLM for approximately €20 million. It was shut down in October 2004.

In June 2003, spats between O'Leary and the founding Ryan family led to the resignation of Declan Ryan, who had been on the board of directors of the company since 1985. The Ryan family sold additional shares in the company, reducing their stake to 55 million shares. Tony Ryan offered to resign, but he remained on the board until he died in 2007.

In August 2003, MyTravelLite started to compete with Ryanair on the Birmingham to Dublin route. Ryanair set up competing flights on some of MyTravelLite's routes until it withdrew from the market.

A loss of €3.3 million in the second quarter of 2004 was the airline's first recorded loss for 15 years, but the airline soon became profitable again. The enlargement of the European Union in May 2004 allowed for more new routes for Ryanair. In September 2004, EasyJet announced routes to Ireland for the first time, beginning with the Cork to London Gatwick route. In 2006, EasyJet withdrew its Gatwick-Cork, Gatwick-Shannon, Gatwick-Knock and Luton-Shannon routes due to competition from Ryanair.

In February 2006, Britain's Channel 4 broadcast a documentary as part of its Dispatches series, "Ryanair caught napping". The documentary criticised Ryanair's training policies, security procedures and aircraft hygiene, and highlighted poor staff morale. Ryanair denied the allegations and claimed that promotional materials, in particular a photograph of a stewardess sleeping, had been faked. In May 2006, the company was criticised by The Guardian for its £3.15 "aviation insurance levy" added to the cost of all tickets; the publication noted that most of this was profit to the airline.

An early day motion in the British Parliament put forward in July 2006 criticised Ryanair for its complex, predominantly online-only complaints process; it was signed by 57 members but tabled on 24 July 2006.

In October 2006, Ryanair launched a €1.48 billion bid to buy Aer Lingus; Ryanair already owned 19% of Aer Lingus. Aer Lingus immediately rejected Ryanair's takeover bid, saying it undervalued the airline. In October 2006, DFDS Seaways ended its Newcastle–Gothenburg ferry service, the only dedicated passenger ferry service between Sweden and the United Kingdom, citing competition from low-cost air services, especially Ryanair.

In April 2007, Ryanair CEO Michael O'Leary stated that it had the goal of launching a transatlantic low-cost airline; the launch was delayed and never came to fruition. In 2023, Ryanair said that it had no plans for transatlantic routes.

In August 2007, the company started charging passengers to check in at the airport to encourage people to check in online, thereby reducing costs. In October 2007, upon the death of Tony Ryan, the Ryan family stake in the airline was 5.9%.

In October 2008, Ryanair withdrew operations from a base in Europe for the first time when it closed its base in Valencia, Spain. Ryanair estimated the closure led to 750 job losses.

In September 2008, Ryanair asked the Irish High Court to investigate why it had been refused permission to fly from Ireland West Airport to Dublin. This route was won by CityJet, which could not operate the service; the route was then given to Aer Arann without an additional tender process. However, Ryanair lost its challenge in the courts.

In December 2008, Ryanair launched a second takeover bid of Aer Lingus, offering an all-cash offer of €748 million, a 28% premium on the average value of Aer Lingus stock during the preceding 30 days. The Aer Lingus board rejected the offer. In January 2009, Ryanair ended the takeover bid after it was rejected by the Irish government on the grounds it undervalued the airline and would harm competition. However, Ryanair retained a 30% stake in Aer Lingus; in October 2010, competition regulators in the UK opened an inquiry, due to concerns that Ryanair's stake may lead to a reduction in competition. In 2015, after multiple appeals, the Competition Commission required Ryanair to sell down its stake in Aer Lingus to 5% by selling shares to International Airlines Group, which acquired Aer Lingus that year.

In February 2009, Ryanair announced that later that year it would close all airport check-in desks and that passengers would be able to leave their luggage at a bag drop, but everything else would be done online.

In May 2009, Ryanair abolished airport check-in and replaced it with a fast bag drop for those passengers checking in bags, adding fees for passengers that do not check in online. In June 2009, due to the Great Recession, Ryanair reported an annual loss of €169 million, its first annual loss since the IPO.

=== 2010s ===
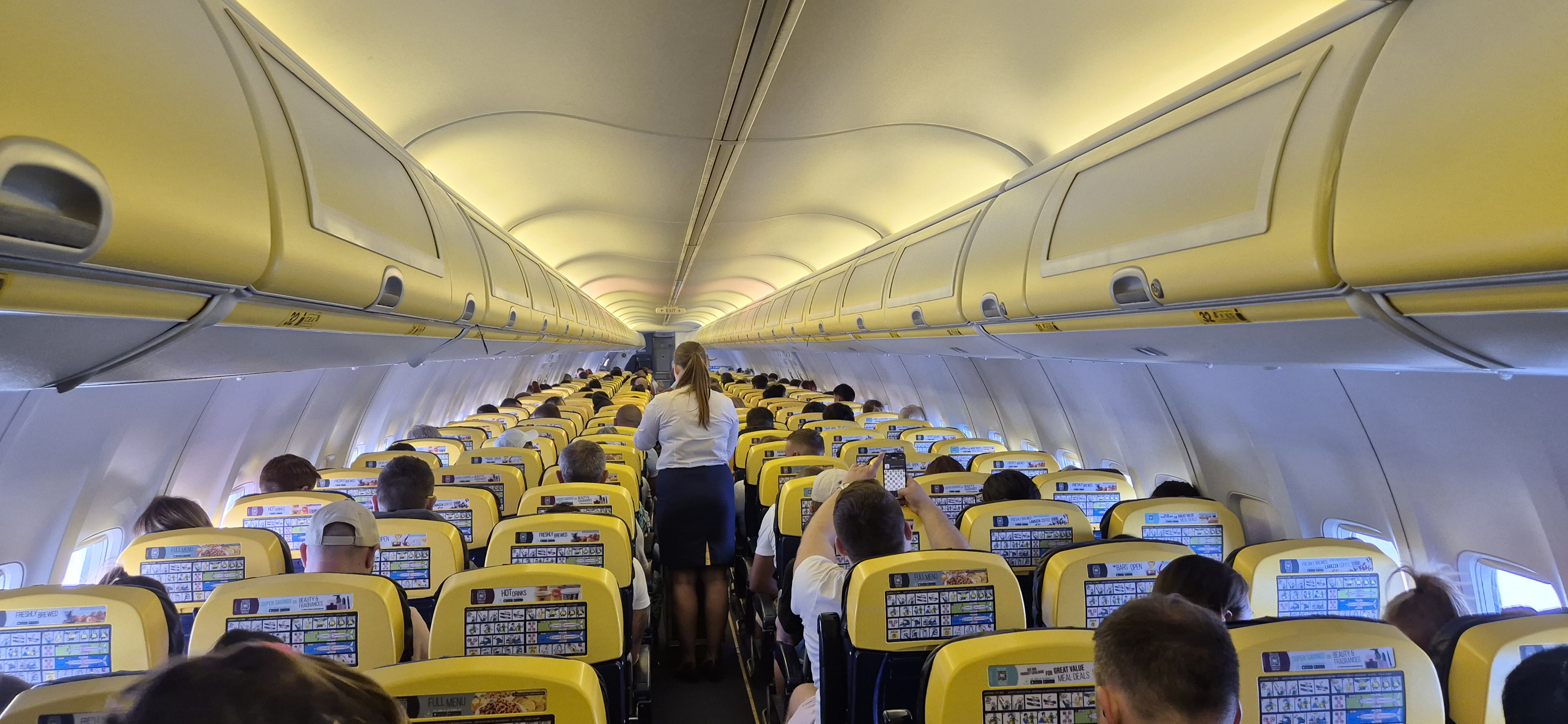
Cabin on board a Ryanair Boeing 737-800 featuring the old Ryanair seats

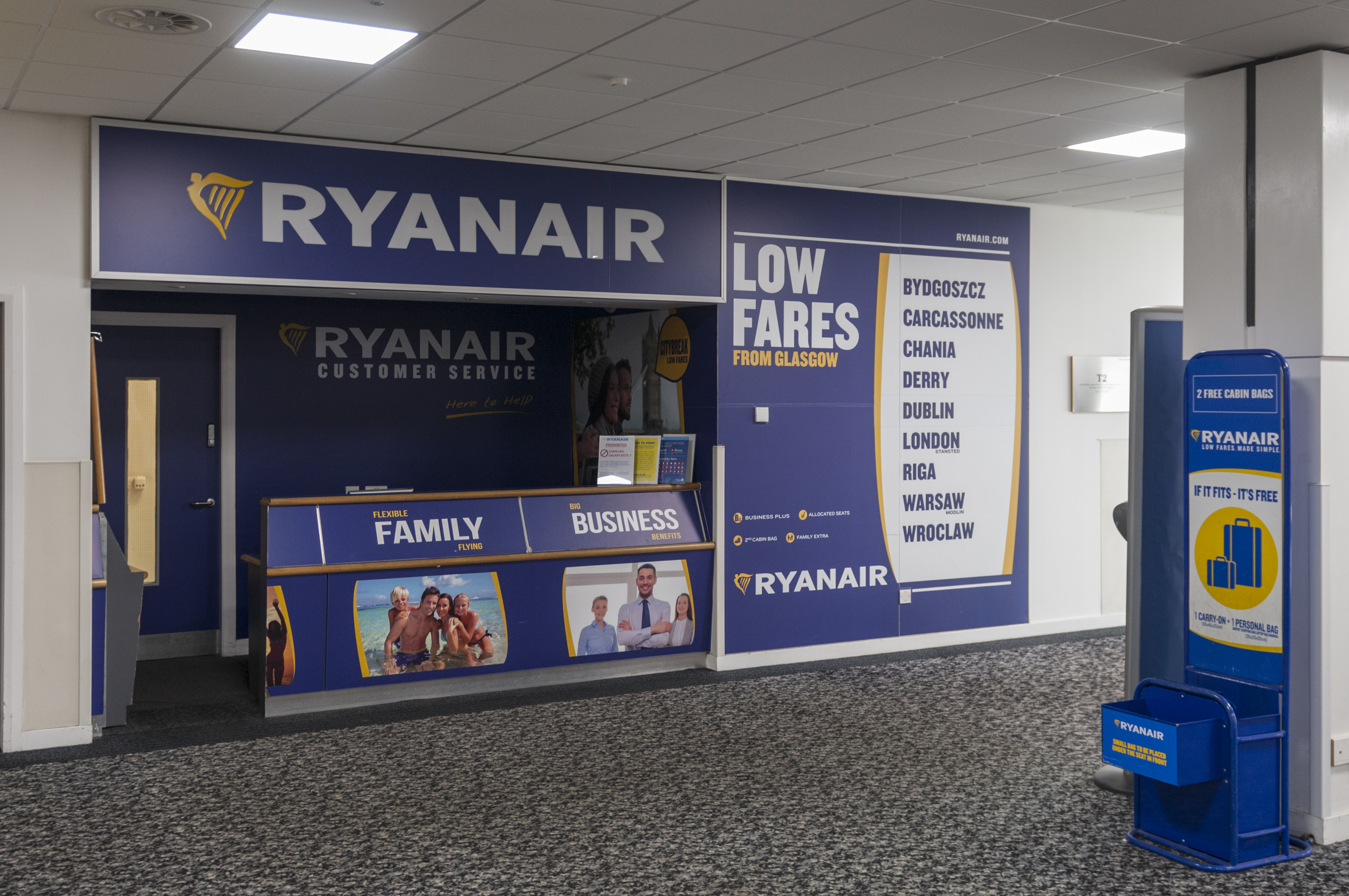
Ryanair service counter at Glasgow International Airport, Scotland, United Kingdom

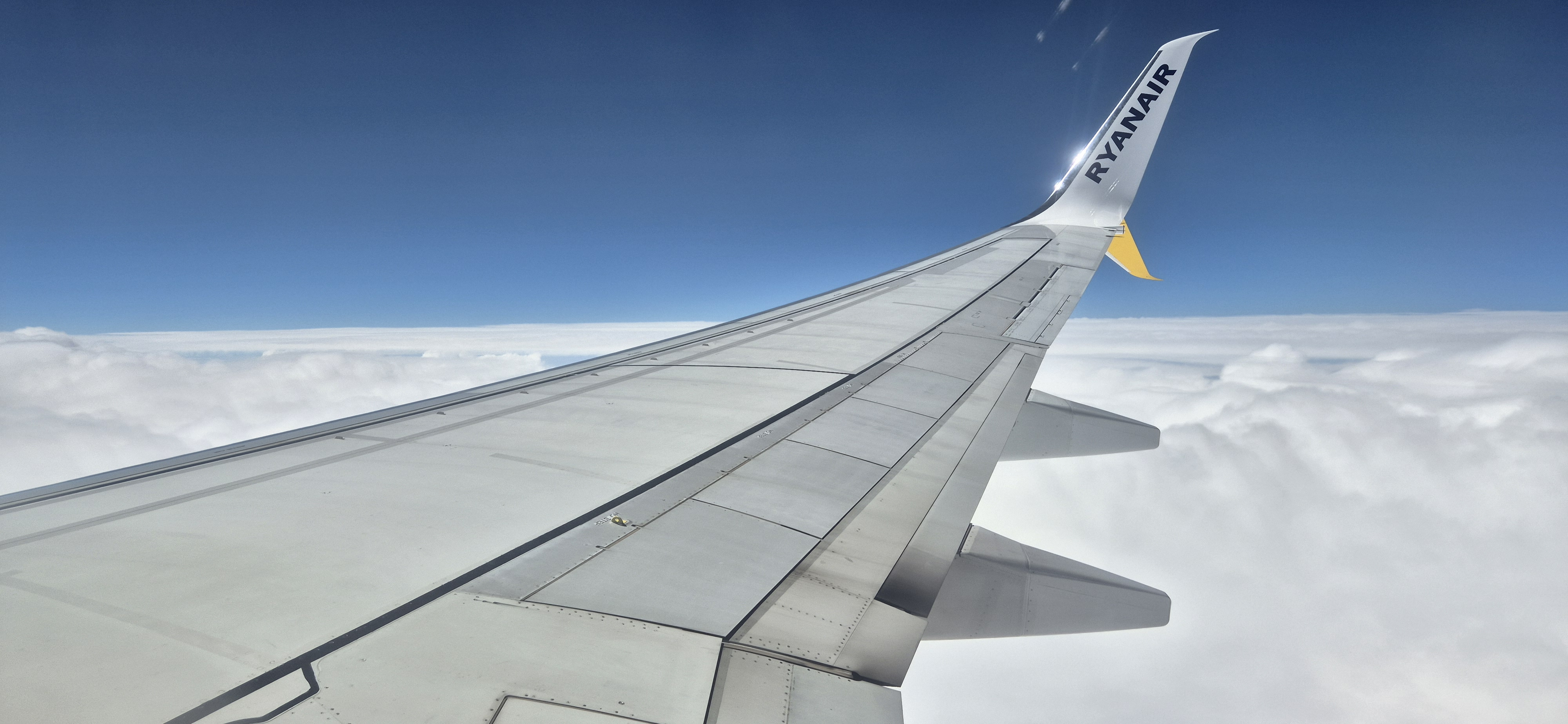
Ryanair UK Boeing 737-800 featuring Split Scimitar winglets

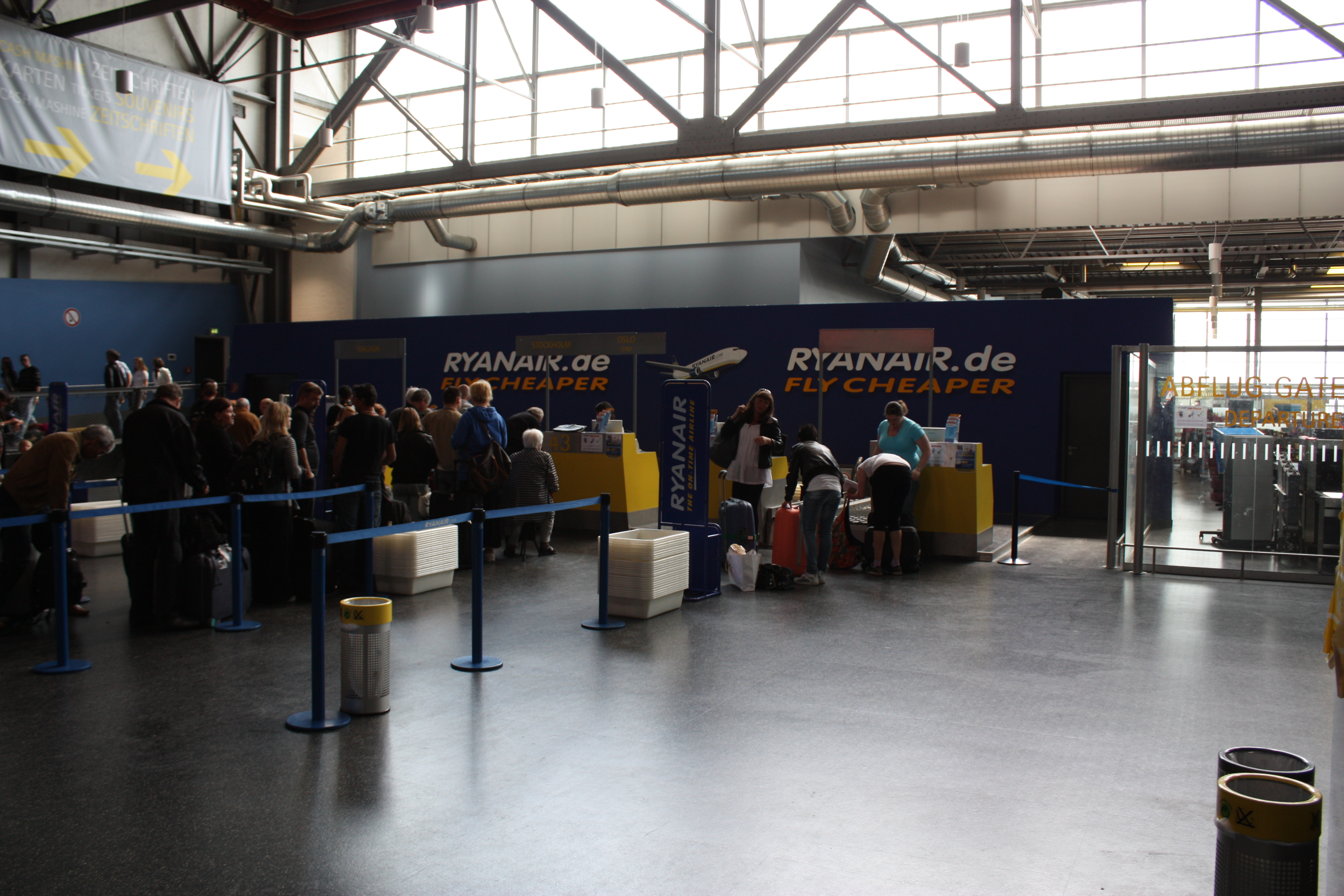
Ryanair check-in area at Bremen Airport, Germany

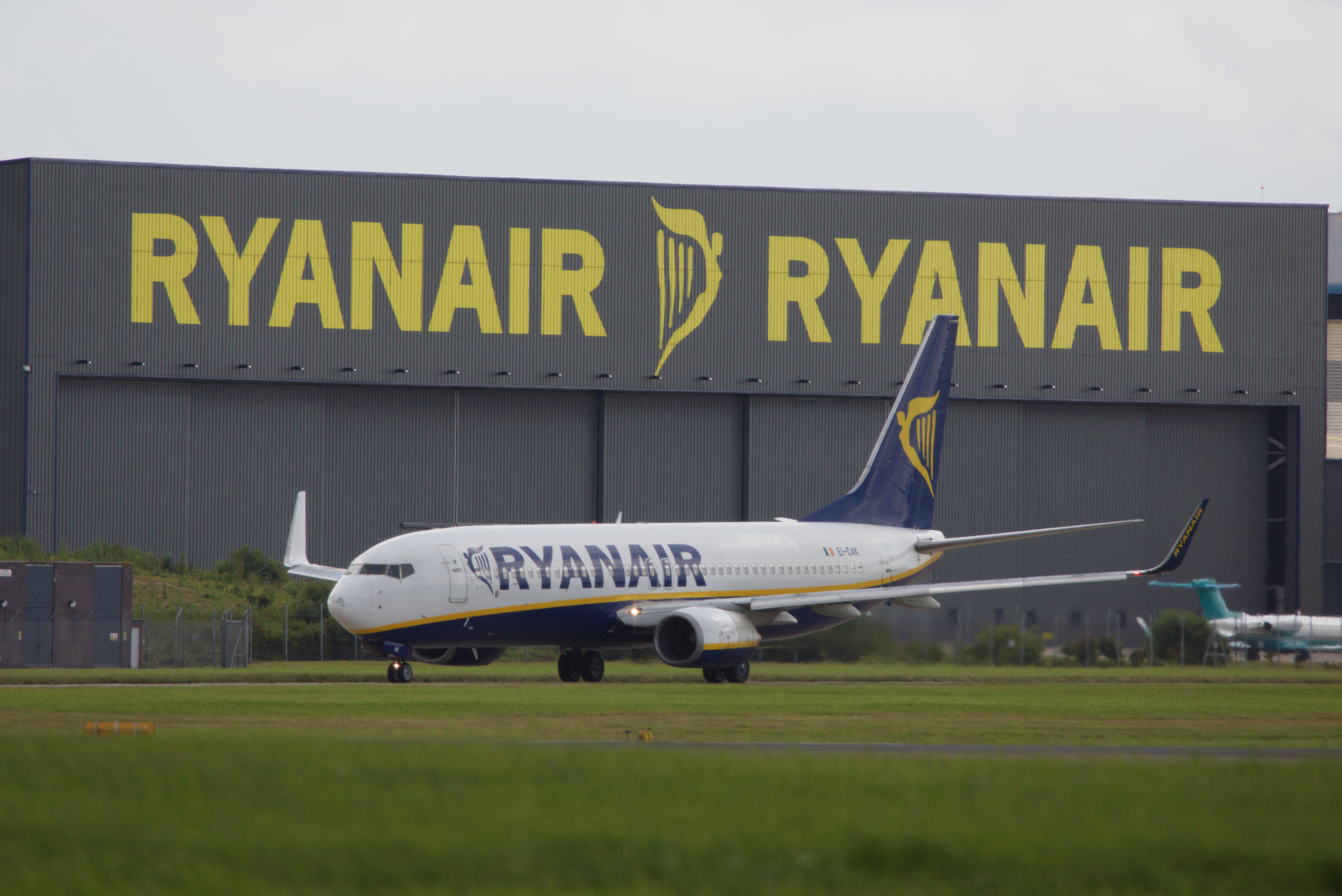
Ryanair maintenance hangars at London Stansted Airport, England, United Kingdom

In May 2010, Ryanair was fined €3 million by Italy's civil aviation authority for refusing to pay for lodging and food for passengers stranded due to air travel disruption after the 2010 Eyjafjallajökull eruption. The refusal resulted in a lawsuit; Ryanair lost the case in January 2013.

In May 2010, a Spanish customer brought a claim against Ryanair for unfair surcharges, claiming that the €40 surcharge on passengers who failed to print out a boarding card before arrival at the airport was unfair. In January 2011, a judge ruled that Ryanair can neither demand passengers turn up at the airport with their boarding pass, nor charge them if they do not, and that the fines were abusive because aviation law obliges airlines to issue boarding passes. Ryanair appealed the decision, and the Appeals Court in Spain overturned the ruling in November 2011, holding that the surcharge complies with international law.

In 2010, Ryanair carried 66.5 million passengers.

In 2011, Ryanair legally challenged regulations to ban credit card surcharges. Ryanair used a legal loophole to continue to charge credit card surcharges by allowing for payment with a very low-frequency payment mechanism without a surcharge.

In February 2011, Ryanair opened a maintenance hangar at Glasgow Prestwick Airport, its biggest fleet maintenance base.

In March 2011, a former Ryanair captain was awarded £40,000 by an employment tribunal in London after being fired for handing out a union form to a cabin crew member while on duty.

In June 2011, Ryanair and COMAC signed an agreement to cooperate on the development of the C-919, to compete with the Boeing 737.

In April 2011, Ryanair began adding a surcharge of €2 to its flights to cover the costs arising from compliance with EC Regulation 261/2004, which requires it to pay for meals and accommodation for passengers on delayed and cancelled flights.

Ryanair cut capacity by grounding 80 aircraft between November 2011 and April 2012 due to the high cost of fuel and weak economic conditions during the Euro area crisis.

In July 2012, a 69-year-old woman, Frances Duff, who has a colostomy, was refused permission to bring her medical kit on board, despite having a letter from her doctor explaining the need for her to carry this with her, and was asked by Ryanair boarding staff to lift her shirt in front of fellow passengers to prove that she had a colostomy bag. Duff had previously attempted to contact Ryanair on three occasions to inquire about its policy regarding travellers' colostomy bags, but each time no one answered the phone after half an hour.

After failing to reach an agreement from negotiations in 2009, in March 2013, Ryanair signed an order for 175 new Boeing 737-800 aircraft with a list price value of $15.6 billion before discounts, increasing its fleet by 30%, to 400 planes. At that time, Ryanair had 305 planes.

In August 2013, as part of its Dispatches series, Channel 4 aired a documentary, "Ryanair: Secrets from the Cockpit", that made allegations about Ryanair's safety standards. Ryanair sued Channel 4 and The Independent for defamation and fired a pilot who appeared in the documentary. The case with The Independent was settled in November 2013. The case with Channel 4 was settled in 2025 on undisclosed terms.

In October 2013, Ryanair announced what it described as a series of "customer service improvements", including lower fees for reprinting boarding passes, free changes of minor errors on bookings within 24 hours, and a free second small carry-on bag. Ryanair said it was making the changes as a result of customer feedback. The airline also redesigned its website, reducing the number of clicks required to book a flight from 17 to 5. The changes came about after a profit warning implored management to improve customer satisfaction.

In January 2014, Ryanair moved into a new €20 million, 100,000 sq ft (9,300 m^{2}) Dublin head office in Airside Business Park, having outgrown its previous office within Dublin Airport.

In April 2014, Ryanair ordered five more aircraft, four of them to be delivered in 2015 and the last one to be delivered in February 2016, to bring the number of aircraft on order to 180.

In May 2014, Ryanair's office in Marseille was raided by French police investigating complaints that the company was failing to follow French employment law. Ryanair lodged a complaint.

In June 2014, Ryanair announced a campaign to reinvent itself as a more family-friendly airline. At the company's 2014 annual general meeting, CEO Michael O'Leary said that the airline needed to "stop unnecessarily pissing people off". Ryanair said up to 20% of its 81 million customers were travelling as families, and it wanted to raise that figure. Service improvements included not charging customers for minor infractions of its bag policy and eliminating some "irksome charges and restrictions". This change in approach had an almost immediate positive effect on the company's finances.

In the summer of 2014, Ryanair contracted AirExplore to operate some summer flights between London Stansted and Dublin airports.

In September 2014, Ryanair agreed to purchase up to 200 Boeing 737 MAX 200 aircraft (100 confirmed and 100 options) with a list price of over $22 billion before discounts.

In May 2015, the Mayor of Copenhagen supported boycotting Ryanair and banned city employees from using the airline during working hours after Danish unions protested salary and working conditions. After a court trial confirmed the unions' right to a strike action, Ryanair closed its operations in Denmark.

In March 2016, Ryanair launched a corporate jet charter service, offering a Boeing 737-700 for corporate or group hire.

In November 2016, Ryanair launched Ryanair Holidays, a package holiday service, in partnership with Spain-based tour operator Logitravel and accommodation provider World2Meet. The service was first launched in Ireland, the United Kingdom and Germany. The service was discontinued in January 2019.

In April 2017, Ryanair started issuing tickets for connecting flights, starting with a transfer hub in Rome Fiumicino Airport (FCO), meaning if a connection is missed, the customer will be rebooked at no extra cost and compensated according to the EU Flight Compensation Regulation.

In September and October 2017, Ryanair cancelled between 40 and 50 flights per day, about 2% of total daily flights. Flights were cancelled with very little notice, sometimes only hours before departure. Ryanair said that the cancellations aimed "to improve its system-wide punctuality", which had dropped significantly in the first two weeks of September, which the airline attributed to "ATC capacity delays and strikes, weather disruptions and the impact of increased holiday allocations to pilots and cabin crew." In subsequent statements, Ryanair acknowledged that it had "messed up" holiday schedules for pilots, including a change to the calendar year for how vacations were calculated.

=== 2017–2018: Abandonment of the single-airline strategy, union recognition ===
Ryanair had only operated with its Irish Air Operator's Certificate and solely under the Ryanair brand. However, in April 2017, Ryanair announced that it would launch an independent Polish subsidiary in 2018, operating charter flights from Poland to Mediterranean destinations. The subsidiary was branded Ryanair Sun and received its Polish Air Operator's Certificate in April 2018. Initially, it had only one former Ryanair Boeing 737-800 and complemented its operation with wet-leased aircraft from its parent company. In late 2018, all Polish-based Ryanair aircraft were transferred to Ryanair Sun. Ryanair Sun mainly operated scheduled flights on behalf of its parent company using Ryanair's FR flight numbers. Ryanair Sun was rebranded Buzz in 2019.

In December 2017, to prevent strike actions before Christmas, Ryanair agreed to recognise pilots' unions for the first time.

Ryanair UK was established in December 2017 "to protect itself from a hard Brexit". Its first aircraft, re-registered as G-RUKA, was transferred from Ryanair DAC in 2018, with a second aircraft following in 2019.

In 2017, the government of Portugal requested the intervention of the Tax and Customs Authority to force the company to issue invoices to passengers for the VAT-exempt services to allow them to claim tax refunds after passengers complained of difficulties in getting such invoices.

In March 2018, Ryanair acquired 25% of Austrian-based Laudamotion, founded by Niki Lauda, and later renamed "Lauda". Laudamotion was the successor of Niki, which had folded as a consequence of the Air Berlin demise. Ryanair later increased its stake in Laudamotion to 75% and then 100% in December 2018.

In August 2018, to reduce plane turnaround time, Ryanair announced a baggage policy under which passengers must purchase "Priority Boarding" to carry on both a large and a small bag, capped by the capacity on the aircraft; previously there was no charge to carry on bags. The move came about after flights were delayed due to too much luggage at the boarding gate. The move was mirrored by Wizz Air.

In August 2018, pilots of Ryanair in Germany, Sweden, Ireland, Belgium and the Netherlands walked out for 24 hours, leading to the cancellation of 400 flights.

On 26 September 2018, Ryanair was forced to cancel 150 flights scheduled for that day, accounting for roughly 6% of its total flights, due to strikes in Spain, Belgium, the Netherlands, Portugal, Italy, and Germany. The British Civil Aviation Authority (CAA) urged the company to compensate the 2,400 affected passengers under EU Regulation 261, but Ryanair stated that it would refuse to accept any claims for compensation. In December 2018, the Civil Aviation Authority took legal action against Ryanair over its refusal to compensate thousands of UK-based customers. In April 2021, the High Court rejected Ryanair's claim that it was exempt from awarding compensation because the disruption was due to "extraordinary circumstances". The ruling was upheld by the Court of Appeal in February 2022. In December 2022, Ryanair dropped its appeal to the Supreme Court, agreeing to pay claims for flights cancelled due to union-led industrial action.

In June 2018, Ryanair signed a recognition agreement with Unite the Union to enable collective bargaining for 650 directly employed cabin crew operating out of Ryanair's UK bases.

In August 2018, Ryanair reached a collective labour agreement with the Italian pilots' union. It signed a deal with Italian cabin crew unions in September 2018.

In September 2018, pilots, cabin crew and other staff called for a strike action due to the transition from workers being employed on Irish contracts and subject to Irish legislation to their own countries' labour laws, along with an issue with their pay. Due to the lobbying of the crew and walk-outs of pilots, the airline cancelled 250 flights, affecting around 40,000 passengers.

In February 2019, the transition began from the airline Ryanair and its subsidiaries into separate airlines under the holding company.

In May 2019, following the Boeing 737 MAX groundings, Ryanair initially reaffirmed its confidence in the aircraft and indicated that it would be ready to place an order once it had returned to service; it would seek a reduced price instead of cash compensation.

In June 2019, Ryanair established an airline called Malta Air (not to be confused with Air Malta), to consist of an initial fleet of 10 aircraft and assume the 61 flights currently operated by Ryanair to/from Malta. The fleet was registered in Malta, and a new repair and maintenance hangar was set up. Ryanair transferred all its existing Maltese operations to the new airline. Ryanair also transferred additional bases in Europe to the Maltese subsidiary due to a legal requirement for certain staff to pay tax in Ireland even though they did not live in Ireland.

In August 2019, after Ryanair attempted to block strike action by UK pilots through the courts, the High Court allowed the strike over pay and working conditions to go ahead.

In August 2019, due to the transition inside the holding company, each airline (Ryanair, LaudaMotion, Ryanair Sun and Ryanair UK) got its own CEO and management team. Edward Wilson became the CEO of the airline Ryanair and Michael O'Leary became the Group CEO.

=== 2020: COVID-19 pandemic ===
During the COVID-19 pandemic, Ryanair laid off pilots and cabin crew and reduced its flight schedule.

In September 2020, the airline threatened to end operations in Ireland unless the government lifted COVID-19 lockdowns, including quarantine requirements.

In April and May 2020, during the COVID-19 pandemic, customers claimed that they allegedly refused refunds for the flight cancellations, leading to a surge in complaints to the Commission for Aviation Regulation (CAR).

In April 2020, the Italian Civil Aviation Authority threatened a ban on Ryanair due to alleged violation of COVID-19 regulations, including the requirement for social distancing, by leaving middle seats empty.

In December 2020, Ryanair increased its order for Boeing 737 MAX 200 aircraft by 75, to a total of 210 aircraft, for delivery from early 2021 to December 2024.

Ryanair sued governments that provided aid to state-owned airlines during the pandemic; it lost these lawsuits.

=== 2021–present ===
After delays due to the Boeing 737 MAX groundings, the first Boeing 737 MAX 200 was delivered to Ryanair in June 2021. In July 2021, Ryanair handed back all of its leased Boeing 737 aircraft and announced plans to hand back its leased Airbus aircraft.

In June 2022, after backlash, Ryanair cancelled a policy to make South Africans take a general knowledge test in the Afrikaans language before allowing them to board UK-bound flights as a means to verify that their passports were genuine. South Africa has 11 official languages, of which Afrikaans is the 3rd most spoken, with a prevalence of 12%. A majority of the population cannot understand Afrikaans, and some refuse to speak it on principle, regarding it as the language of oppression during the apartheid era.

In January 2023, the first Ryanair 737-800 to be retrofitted with split scimitar winglets entered service. The winglets reduce fuel burn by 1.5% and are to be fitted to all existing −800 aircraft in the Ryanair fleet.

In July 2022, Ryanair extended its Airbus A320 leases (for Lauda Europe) to 2028.

In May 2023, Ryanair ordered 300 Boeing 737 MAX 10 aircraft, with a total list price of €36.3 billion before discounts. The deal included 150 firm orders and options for 150 more with deliveries between 2027 and 2033, with plans to replace its 737-800 aircraft. The order followed an 18-month public argument with Boeing over pricing, and Ryanair ultimately achieved a lower discount off list price than previous orders.

Ryanair initiated a regular dividend in November 2023.

In June 2024, pursuant to a call option, Ryanair purchased the golden share in Malta Air owned by the Government of Malta for €25,000.

In June 2025, Ryanair signed a $500 million engine deal with CFM International and in February 2026, Ryanair signed a multibillion-dollar services agreement with CFM to bring engine maintenance in-house to maintain its 2,000 CFM International engines.

In August 2025, Ryanair reached a deal with Booking Holdings to allow the sale of Ryanair tickets by brands owned by Booking Holdings, resolving a 3-year legal dispute.

In November 2025, Ryanair shut its "prime" discount service, launched in February 2025, because customers exploited its benefits too much. The service offered free seat selection, travel insurance, and fare sales for €79 per year. Also that month, Ryanair began solely using digital boarding passes.

In November 2025, Ryanair was denied permission to appeal against a judgement which ruled that a pilot who flew exclusively for the airline was a temporary worker and not a self-employed contractor. Ryanair used independent contractors as pilots to save costs.

In December 2025, Italy's competition authority fined Ryanair €255 million for allegedly making it more difficult for travel agencies to offer flights by Ryanair in combination with flights from other airlines.

In February 2026, the Brussels Commercial Court ordered Ryanair to suspend "pressure selling" tactics on its website, including messages about seat scarcity and the urgency of purchasing tickets, promoting non-existent discounts, and hiding baggage charges.

In June 2026, the Competition and Markets Authority announced an investigation into Ryanair's policy of requiring a parent to pay for a "mandatory family seat" for parents to sit next to their children. Later that month, Ryanair announced it would allow parents to sit next to their children for free.

== Business trends and financials ==
The key trends for the Ryanair Group are (as of the financial year ending 31 March):

| | Turnover (€m) | Profit after tax (€m) | Number of employees (Note: average) | Number of passengers (m) | Passenger load factor (%) | Number of served airports | Number of served countries | Number of aircraft (Note: at year end) | Sources |
|---|---|---|---|---|---|---|---|---|---|
| 2010 | 2,988 | 305 | 7,032 | 67 | 82 | 153 | 27 | 232 | |
| 2011 | 3,629 | 375 | 8,063 | 72 | 83 | 158 | 27 | 272 | |
| 2012 | 4,390 | 560 | 8,438 | 76 | 82 | 159 | 28 | 294 | |
| 2013 | 4,884 | 569 | 9,059 | 79 | 82 | 167 | 28 | 305 | |
| 2014 | 5,037 | 523 | 9,501 | 82 | 83 | 186 | 30 | 297 | |
| 2015 | 5,654 | 867 | 9,586 | 91 | 88 | 190 | 30 | 308 | |
| 2016 | 6,536 | 1,559 | 10,926 | 106 | 93 | 200 | 33 | 341 | |
| 2017 | 6,648 | 1,316 | 12,438 | 120 | 94 | 207 | 34 | 383 | |
| 2018 | 7,151 | 1,450 | 13,803 | 130 | 95 | 216 | 37 | 431 | |
| 2019 | 7,697 | 885 | 15,938 | 142 | 96 | 219 | 37 | 471 | |
| 2020 | 8,495 | 649 | 17,268 | 148 | 95 | 242 | 40 | 466 | |
| 2021 | 1,636 | −1,015 | 15,016 | 28 | 71 | 225 | 37 | 451 | |
| 2022 | 4,801 | −241 | 19,116 | 97 | 82 | 223 | 36 | 500 | |
| 2023 | 10,780 | 1,314 | 22,261 | 169 | 93 | 222 | 36 | 537 | |
| 2024 | 13,444 | 1,917 | 27,076 | 184 | 94 | 235 | 37 | 584 | |
| 2025 | 13,949 | 1,612 | 25,952 | 200 | 94 | 228 | 37 | 613 | |

As of March 2024, the group employed 16,900 cabin crew, 7,000 pilots, 1,500 IT and administrative staff, 790 ground operations personnel, 650 maintenance workers, and 120 managers.

== Publicity strategy ==
"Short of committing murder, negative publicity sells more seats than positive publicity. Charging for toilets continues to be the number one story that resurfaces in the press and it’s the gift that keeps on giving. We’ve never done it, but it keeps coming up on social networks every three or four months, the media picks up on it and then someone writes a story on it. Negative publicity generates so much more free publicity that it sells more tickets."

— Ryanair CEO Michael O'Leary, Interview with Campaign

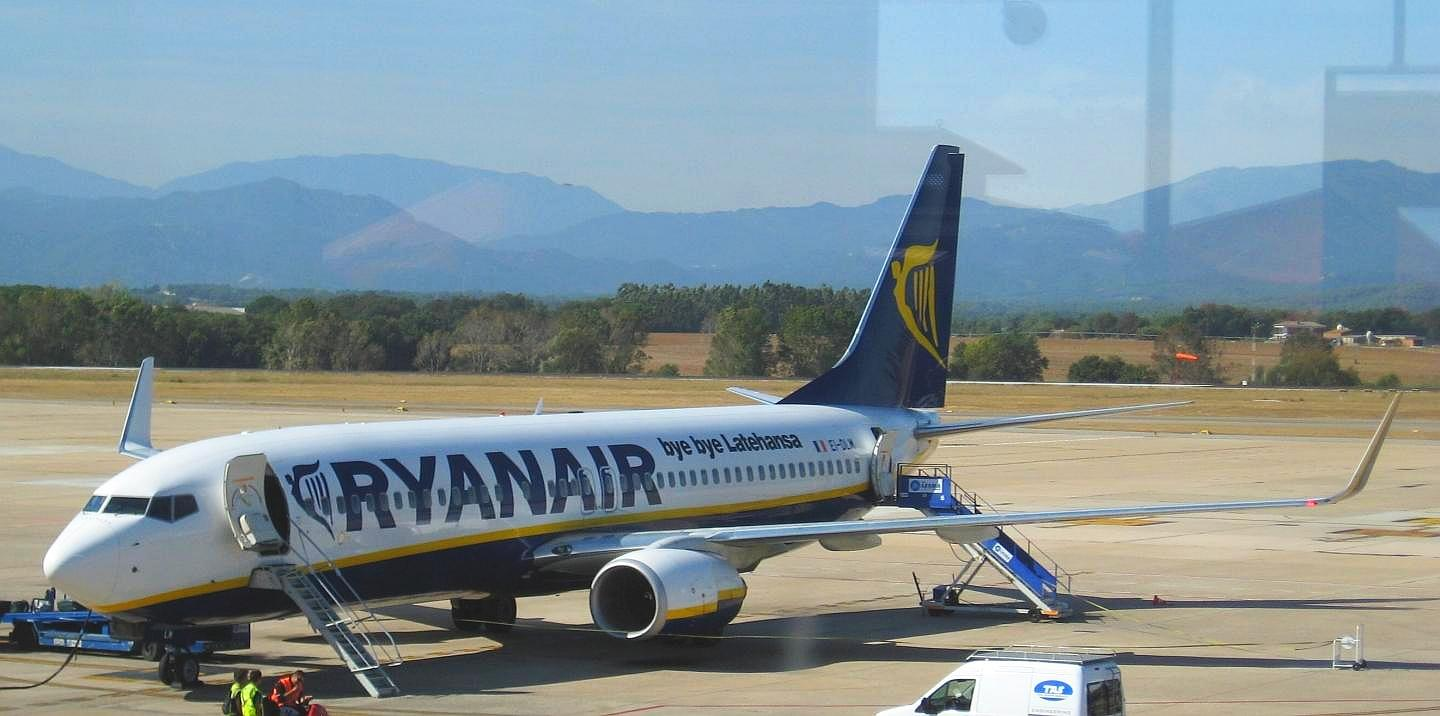
Ryanair Boeing 737-800 displaying "bye bye Latehansa" titles referring to German competitor Lufthansa in 2008

Ryanair CEO Michael O'Leary has deliberately courted controversy using misleading advertising and outlandish comments to generate free publicity for the airline.

In 2000, Ryanair launched a provocative ad campaign headlined "Expensive BAstards!", which compared Ryanair prices with those of British Airways. British Airways disagreed with the price comparisons and brought legal action against Ryanair. The High Court sided with Ryanair, ordering BA to make a payment towards Ryanair's court costs. The judge ruled, "The complaint amounts to this: that Ryanair exaggerated in suggesting BA is five times more expensive because BA is only three times more expensive."

In the spring of 2001, a Ryanair advertisement used a picture of Manneken Pis, a famous Belgian statue of a urinating child, with the words: "Pissed off with Sabena's high fares? Low fares have arrived in Belgium." Sabena sued, and the court ruled that the advertisements were misleading and offensive. Ryanair was ordered to discontinue the advertisements immediately or face fines. Ryanair was also obliged to publish an apology and publish the court decision on its website. Ryanair used the published apologies for further advertising, primarily for further price comparisons.

In February 2004, a Ryanair advert depicted fireworks with the headline "Fawking great offers", leading to condemnation by the Advertising Standards Authority (ASA) for using offensive language in an advert.

In August 2007, to promote its new flight routes to/from Belfast, an advertisement by Ryanair showed Sinn Féin politicians Martin McGuinness and Gerry Adams next to a speech bubble which said: "Ryanair fares are so low even the British Army flew home". Michael Copeland stated that the advertisement was "insensitive, crass and made a clear political statement". Ulster Unionists reacted angrily to the advertisement, while the Advertising Standards Authority said it did not believe the ad would cause widespread offence.

In August 2007, Ryanair was ordered by the ASA to stop claiming that its flights from London to Brussels were faster than Eurostar, because the claim was misleading, due to the required travel times to the airports Ryanair served. Ryanair stood by its claims, noting that the flight time is shorter than the train trip and that travel time is also required to reach Eurostar stations.

In the fall of 2007, an advertisement published in UK newspapers depicted a model dressed as a schoolgirl accompanied by the words "Hottest back to school fares". The ASA instructed the airline to withdraw the advertisement in the United Kingdom, saying that it "appeared to link teenage girls with sexually provocative behaviour and was irresponsible and likely to cause serious or widespread offence". Ryanair said that it would "not be withdrawing this ad" and would "not provide the ASA with any of the undertakings they seek", on the basis that it found it absurd that "a picture of a fully clothed model is now claimed to cause 'serious or widespread offence' when many of the UK's leading daily newspapers regularly run pictures of topless or partially dressed females without causing any serious or widespread offence".

In February 2008, a French court ordered Ryanair to pay damages of €1 to Nicolas Sarkozy and €60,000 to Carla Bruni for using their picture in an advertisement with a cartoon bubble above Bruni reading: "With Ryanair, my whole family can come to my wedding." The funds were donated to Restaurants du Cœur.

In April 2008, Ryanair was found by the UK Office of Fair Trading to have breached advertising rules seven times in two years.

From 2008 to 2014, Ryanair published and sold on its flights a charity calendar using female cabin crew as models, raising money for homeless charity Dublin Simon Community in 2009, KIDS (a charity for disabled children and their families) in 2010, and the Teenage Cancer Trust in 2014. It was strongly criticised by the National Women's Council of Ireland (NWCI). In December 2013, an advertising campaign for it was prohibited by Spain following complaints. The airline stopped publishing the calendar after the 2014 edition.

In February 2009, Ryanair CEO Michael O'Leary commented that the company was considering charging passengers £1 to use the toilet on its flights. O'Leary admitted that it was a publicity stunt, saying "It is not likely to happen, but it makes for interesting and very cheap PR."

Also that year, to generate publicity, Ryanair proposed eliminating two toilets to add six more seats, redesigning the aircraft to allow standing passengers travelling in "vertical seats", charging extra for overweight passengers, and asking passengers to carry their checked-in luggage to the aircraft.

In July 2009, Ryanair took several steps to "increase the clarity and transparency of its website and other advertising" after reaching an agreement with the OFT. A statement that "fares don't include optional fees/charges" was added to the website along with a table of fees to make fare comparisons easier.

In July 2010, Ryanair circulated advertisements in two newspapers offering £10 one-way fares to European destinations. However, the offer was available only on a few dates and excluded fees and charges. Following a complaint from EasyJet, the ASA ruled the offer was "likely to mislead".

In April 2011, Ryanair advertised tickets to "a place in the sun destinations" for £8 each, but the advert was banned when it was found that some of the destinations to which the discounted fares applied experienced sunshine for as little as three hours per day and temperatures between 0 and 14 °C (32 and 57 °F).

In 2016, Ryanair stated that websites such as Opodo and CheapOair and their partners engaged in screen scraping and false advertising, and attempted to prevent them from showing Ryanair data.

In February 2020, the ASA told Ryanair to provide adequate evidence to support environmental claims after the ASA banned adverts that claimed Ryanair was "Europe's… Lowest Emissions Airline" for being misleading. Ryanair had claimed in the adverts that the company had "the lowest carbon emissions of any major airline", and it was a "low CO_{2} emissions airline" based on Europe's top 27 airlines. Ryanair cited data from Eurocontrol and airline efficiency rankings from Brighter Plant from 2011; the ASA said that an efficiency ranking from 2011 was "of little value as substantiation for a comparison made in 2019". The ASA said that customers would interpret the adverts as saying that flying with Ryanair would mean they contributed fewer CO_{2} emissions to the earth's atmosphere, which could not be proven and that the "ads must not appear again in their current forms".

In late 2020, the airline faced criticism over its "jab and go" advert, implying that people can fly without a mask after receiving a COVID-19 vaccine. The ASA ordered the company to remove the adverts, which it called "irresponsible", after receiving 2,370 complaints, the third-highest ever received for an advert.

Just after the 2020 United States presidential election, Ryanair engaged in trolling against Donald Trump, posting that "Trump declaring victory this early is like disembarking before the plane has landed." The company also noted that Eric Trump had "the look of a man who might not have access to Air Force One in the future and will have to fly commercial", advertising its discounts within Europe.

In January 2026, the company spat with Elon Musk over the costs, including fuel drag, of installing antennas by Starlink, which is majority-owned by Musk. Musk mused about buying the airline, while Ryanair launched a fare sale dedicated to Musk called the "idiot" sale, and O'Leary claimed that the spat increased bookings and resulted in a "wonderful boost in publicity"; he offered Musk a free ticket on Ryanair as a gesture of thanks.

== Environmental record ==
In 2018, Ryanair became the first airline and the only company excluding fossil fuel power stations to be among the 10 companies with the most greenhouse gas emissions in the European Union. That year, Ryanair had an emission equivalent of 9.9 megatonnes of CO_{2}. Emissions had risen by 49% over five years. Environmentalists said that aviation was undertaxed.

In 2025, Ryanair was ranked the second most-efficient airline worldwide by Passenger CO_{2} per available seat kilometre.

== Destinations ==
Countries in which Ryanair operated as of November 2025

Ryanair operates 3,500 short-haul flights per day serving approximately 230 airports in over 36 countries in Europe as well as Morocco, Jordan, and Turkey. Ryanair has a significant presence in France, Germany, Italy, Poland, Spain, and the United Kingdom. It operates to more destinations in Italy than anywhere else, with fourteen bases and nine non-base airports. Ryanair also serves vacation destinations such as Sicily, the Canary Islands, Cyprus, the Greek Islands, and Malta.

Ryanair's largest base is at London-Stansted, followed by its home base at Dublin Airport.

To save money on landing fees and turnaround time, Ryanair uses many smaller or secondary airports. Examples include Paris Beauvais, Hahn Airport, and Rome Ciampino.

Major airports served by Ryanair include Amsterdam-Schiphol, Athens, Barcelona-El Prat, Berlin-Brandenburg, Brussels Airport, Bucharest-Otopeni, Budapest, Copenhagen, Dublin, Lisbon, London-Stansted, Madrid, Manchester, Marseille, Oslo-Gardermoen, Rome-Fiumicino, and Stockholm-Arlanda.

When Ryanair negotiates with airport operators, it demands very low landing and handling fees, as well as financial assistance with marketing and promotional campaigns. Ryanair also initiates flights between airports that have cheap operating costs, not necessarily based on market research, and will try to generate demand that did not previously exist.

The airline flies in a point-to-point transit model rather than a spoke-hub distribution paradigm model, where passengers have to change aircraft in transit at a major airport. In April 2017, Ryanair began selling connecting flights, starting with a new transfer hub in Rome Fiumicino Airport (FCO).

The expansion and retention of Ryanair's route network are heavily dependent on local taxation and airport fees, with the airline frequently adjusting or cutting capacity to leverage negotiations. Ryanair has historically withdrawn or downscaled operations from airports that implemented passenger or environmental taxes, such as cuts made at Dublin and Shannon (2010), Rygge (2016), Glasgow (2018), Billund and Aalborg (2025), and Charleroi (2026). This pattern continued in April 2026, when the airline reduced flights across Spain and Portugal, targeting smaller airports due to travel taxes, environmental levies linked to the European Union Emissions Trading System, and increased charges set by airport operators like ANA Aeroportos de Portugal. Conversely, the airline rapidly expands capacity in markets that reduce aviation taxes, exemplified by major expansions in Sweden and Germany following the abolition or reduction of aviation levies.

Network adjustments are also driven by operational disputes over terminal infrastructure and slots. The airline has downscaled bases like Frankfurt (2022) due to disputes over airport charges, and halted services to destinations such as Tel Aviv (2025) following disputes regarding low-cost terminal access. Additionally, operational pressures under tight scheduling can result in regulatory penalties; in November 2025, the airline lost landing slots at Eindhoven due to a record of repeatedly delayed flights.

== Fleet ==
=== Current fleet ===
As of April 2026, the fleet of Ryanair Holdings group is composed almost entirely of Boeing 737 models, making it one of the largest Boeing operators globally. The group relies primarily on Boeing 737 Next Generation aircraft alongside the high-capacity Boeing 737 MAX 8-200, which was custom-designed by Boeing specifically for Ryanair to maximise seating capacity and lower per-passenger operating costs. A minor component of the fleet consists of leased Airbus A320s operated by subsidiary Lauda Europe, alongside a small number of corporate aircraft utilised for executive transportation and logistical support.

Ryanair Group fleet
| Aircraft | In service | Orders | Passengers | Notes |
|---|---|---|---|---|
| Airbus A320-200 | 26 | — | 180 | Leased until 2028. Operated by Lauda Europe. |
| Boeing 737-700 | 1 | — | 148 | Operated by Buzz. |
| Boeing 737-800 | 410 | — | 189 | World's largest operator of the Boeing 737-800 variant. |
| Boeing 737 MAX 8-200 | 210 | — | 197 | Launch customer and largest operator. |
| Boeing 737 MAX 10 | — | 150 | 228 | Order with 150 options. Deliveries scheduled from 2027 to 2033. |
| Bombardier Challenger 3500 | 4 | — | VIP | Used for corporate transport of engineers, parts, and crew throughout the network during aircraft maintenance events. |
| Total | 651 | 150 | | |

=== Historic fleet ===
Ryanair has operated the following types of aircraft in the past:

Ryanair historic fleet
| Aircraft | Number | Introduced | Retired | Notes | Refs |
|---|---|---|---|---|---|
| Airbus A320-200 | 2 | 2015 | 2015 | Leased from SmartLynx Airlines | |
| ATR 42-300 | 4 | 1989 | 1991 | One operated by Inter-Canadien. | |
| BAC One-Eleven 500 | 16 | 1986 | 1994 | Including one aircraft on short-term lease from TAROM. | |
| BAe 146-200 | 4 | 2003 | 2004 | Operated by Buzz Stansted, returned to KLM uk | |
| Convair 580 | 1 | 1988 | 1988 | Operated by Partnair. | |
| Boeing 737-200 | 20 | 1994 | 2005 | Replaced by Boeing 737-800. Ryanair sold its fleet of twenty 737-200 aircraft to Autodirect Aviation LLC for $8.1 million in October 2004; six aircraft had already been retired, and the remaining fourteen were transferred between 2004 and 2005. | |
| Boeing 737-300 | 7 | 2002 | 2004 | Replaced by Boeing 737-800. | |
| Boeing 737-400 | 1 | 2004 | 2005 | Leased from Air Atlanta Icelandic | |
| Boeing 737-400 | 2 | 2015 | 2015 | Seasonal lease from AirExplore | |
| Embraer EMB 110 Bandeirante | 1 | 1985 | 1989 | | |
| Hawker Siddeley HS 748 | 2 | 1986 | 1990 | | |
| Short S-25 Sunderland 5 | —N/a | 1989 | 1989 | Sunderland G-BJHS was painted for a proposed Ryanair sponsorship of the Foynes Flying Boat Museum, but this did not happen, and the aircraft was returned to a white and blue livery. | |

== Services ==
To maintain some of the fastest turnaround times in the aviation industry and maximise profit margins, Ryanair utilises a highly customised and utilitarian cabin configuration. The interiors of its Boeing 737 aircraft are stripped of standard convenience features to reduce cleaning times and aircraft weight. The seats are non-reclining, lack seat-back pockets, and feature safety instruction cards affixed directly to the back of the seats rather than distributed as printed booklets. Additionally, life jackets are stowed in overhead compartments rather than under individual passenger seats, allowing cabin crew to perform security inspections rapidly between flights.

On the ground, the airline severely limits the use of expensive airport jet bridges, opting instead for passengers to board via tarmac walkways. To facilitate this process independently of airport ground equipment, Ryanair's Boeing aircraft are equipped with built-in airstairs beneath the forward cabin door. Combined with traditional mobile boarding stairs at the rear door, this configuration allows for dual-door boarding and deplaning simultaneously, significantly lowering airport operational fees and ensuring tight scheduling integrity.

== Accidents and incidents ==
- On 10 November 2008, bird strikes damaged both engines on the approach of Ryanair Flight 4102 from Frankfurt–Hahn Airport, forcing an emergency landing at Rome–Ciampino Airport. Two crew members and eight passengers were taken to hospital with minor injuries. The port undercarriage of the Boeing 737 Next Generation collapsed, leaving the aircraft stranded on the runway and closing the airport for over 35 hours. The rear fuselage, engines, and undercarriage were damaged, rendering the aircraft unusable; it was scrapped. The National Agency for the Safety of Flight released an investigation report on the incident in 2018.
- On 23 May 2021, Ryanair Flight 4978, a Boeing 737 operated by Buzz from Athens to Vilnius, was forced to land at Minsk National Airport by the Belarusian government while it was in Belarusian airspace, using the pretence of a false bomb threat. Belarusian opposition activist Roman Protasevich and his girlfriend, who were wanted by the Belarusian government, were on board; they were arrested upon landing. The landing was personally ordered by President Alexander Lukashenko and was enforced by a Belarusian Air Force MiG-29 fighter aircraft. Airlines subsequently began avoiding Belarusian airspace.
- On 10 July 2026, Ryanair Flight 1879, a Boeing 737 operated by Malta Air flying from Thessaloniki to Memmingen, suffered an uncontained engine failure in which debris destroyed a cabin window, causing a rapid decompression and a 61-year-old passenger to be partially ejected from the cabin. The passenger was restrained by his wife, and the aircraft made an emergency return to Thessaloniki Airport, where he was admitted to hospital. The NTSB's preliminary report, released 13 August, found that a fan blade from the aircraft's engine had separated, sending engine parts through the window, and that bird remains were found in the engine.

== Gallery ==
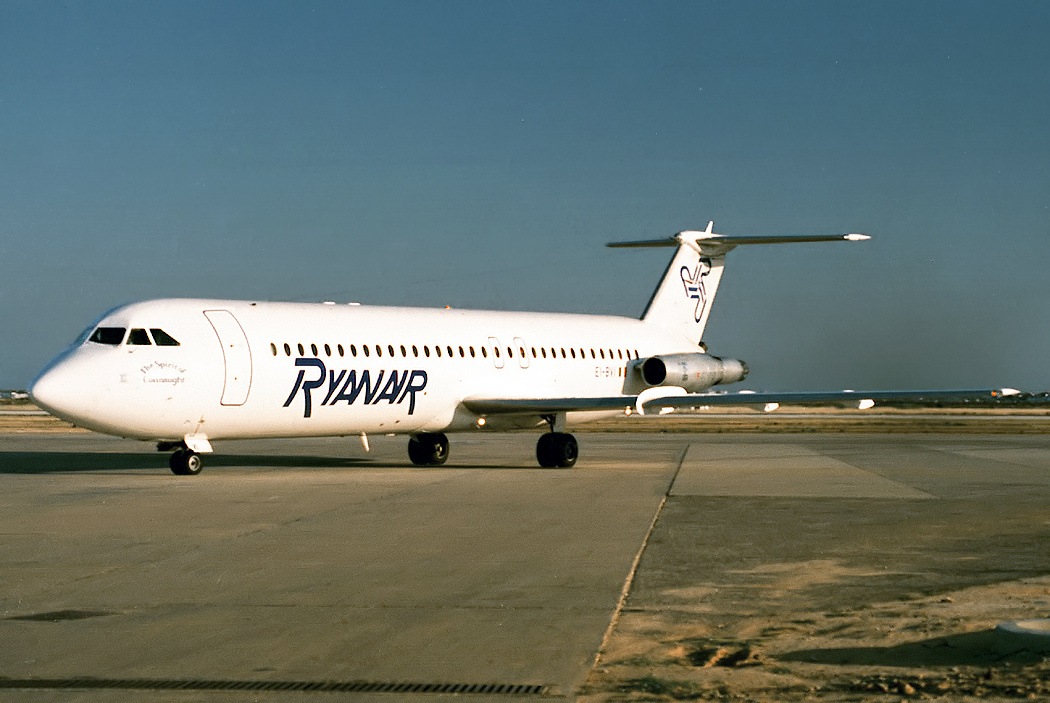
Ryanair operated BAC 1-11 series 500 aircraft between 1988 and 1993.

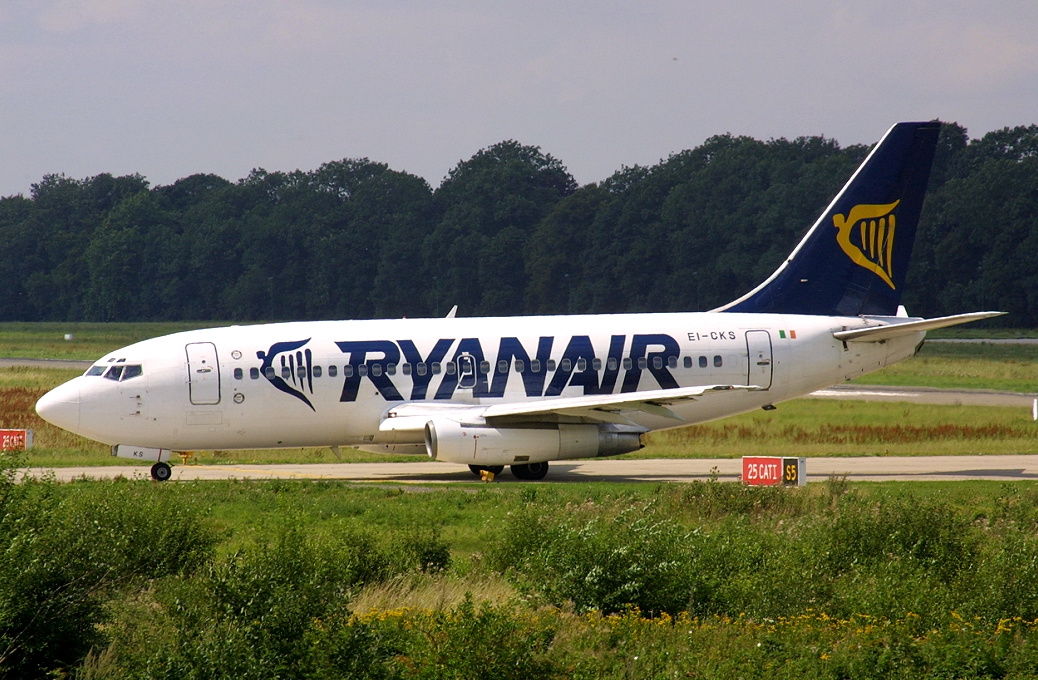
Ryanair Boeing 737-200 in 2001

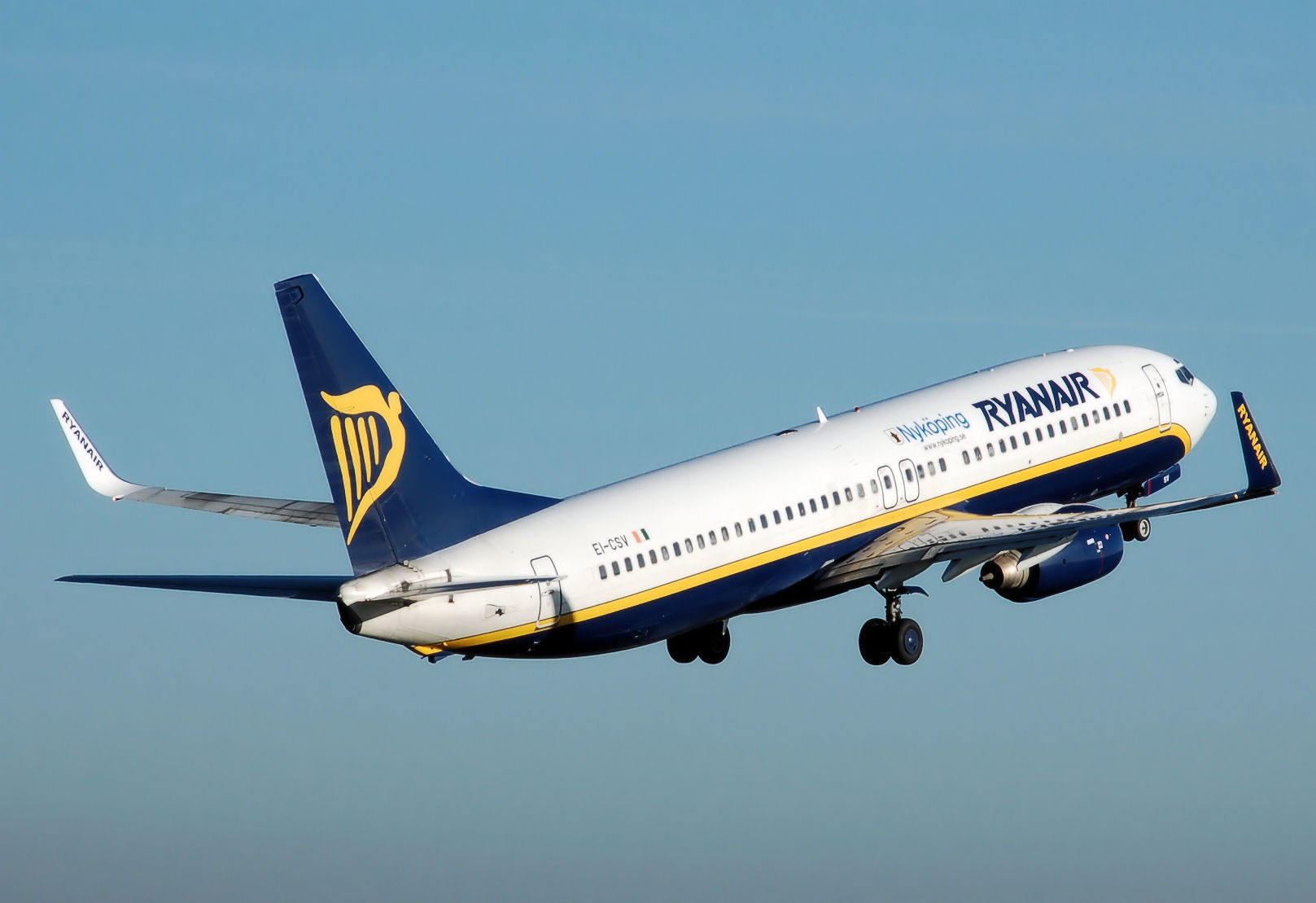
Ryanair Boeing 737-800 in 2005

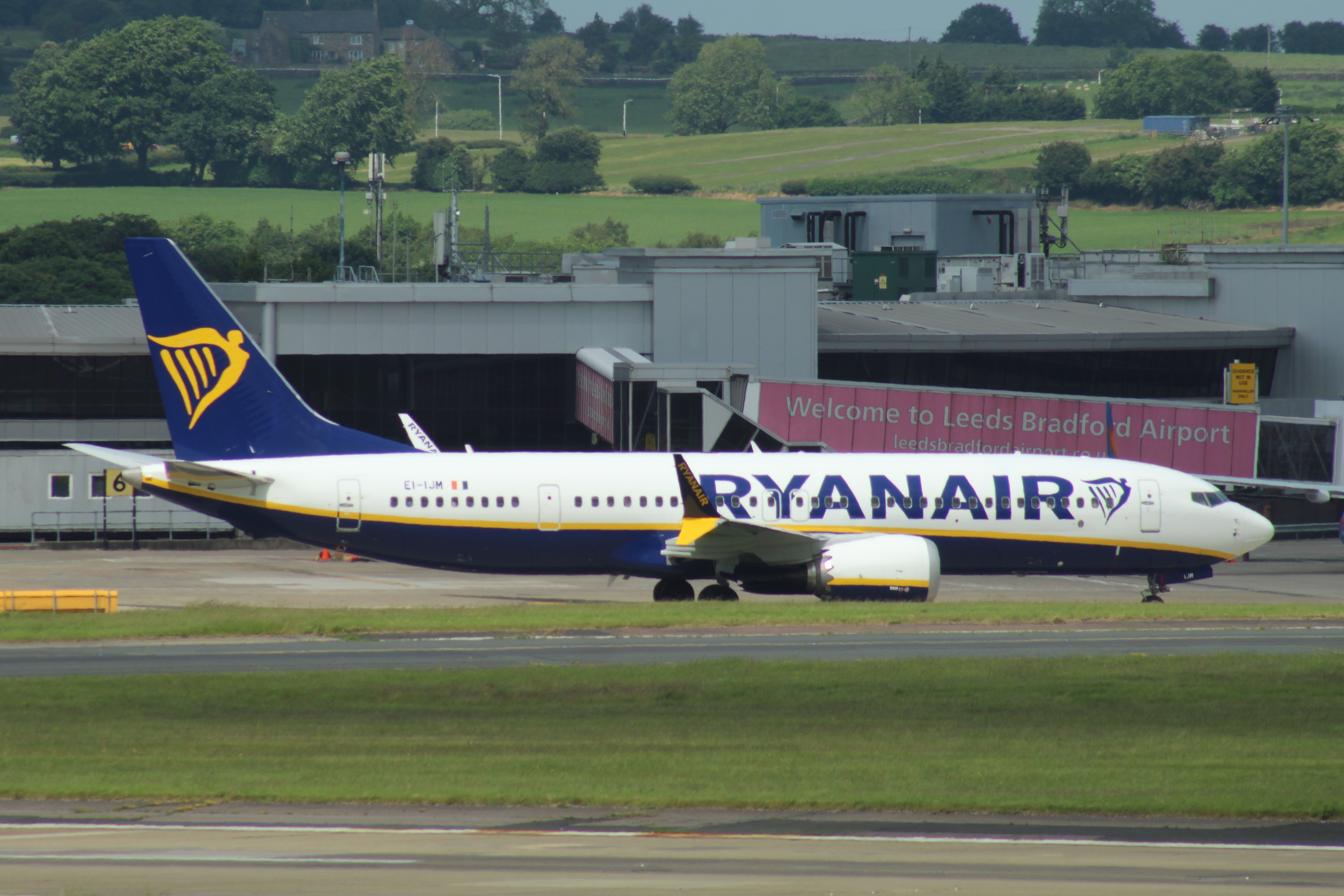
Boeing 737 MAX 8

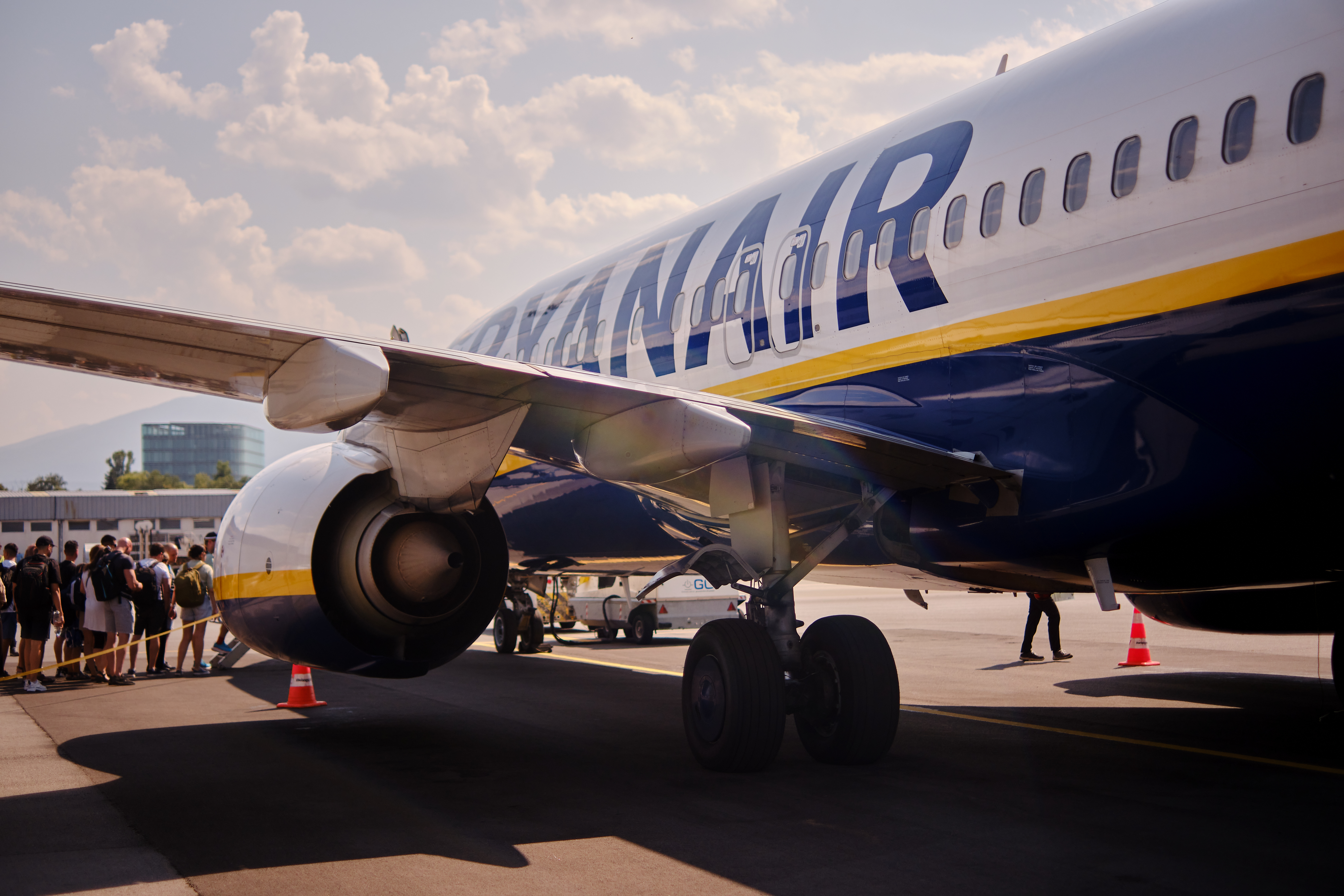
Ryanair 737-800 boarding at Sofia Airport

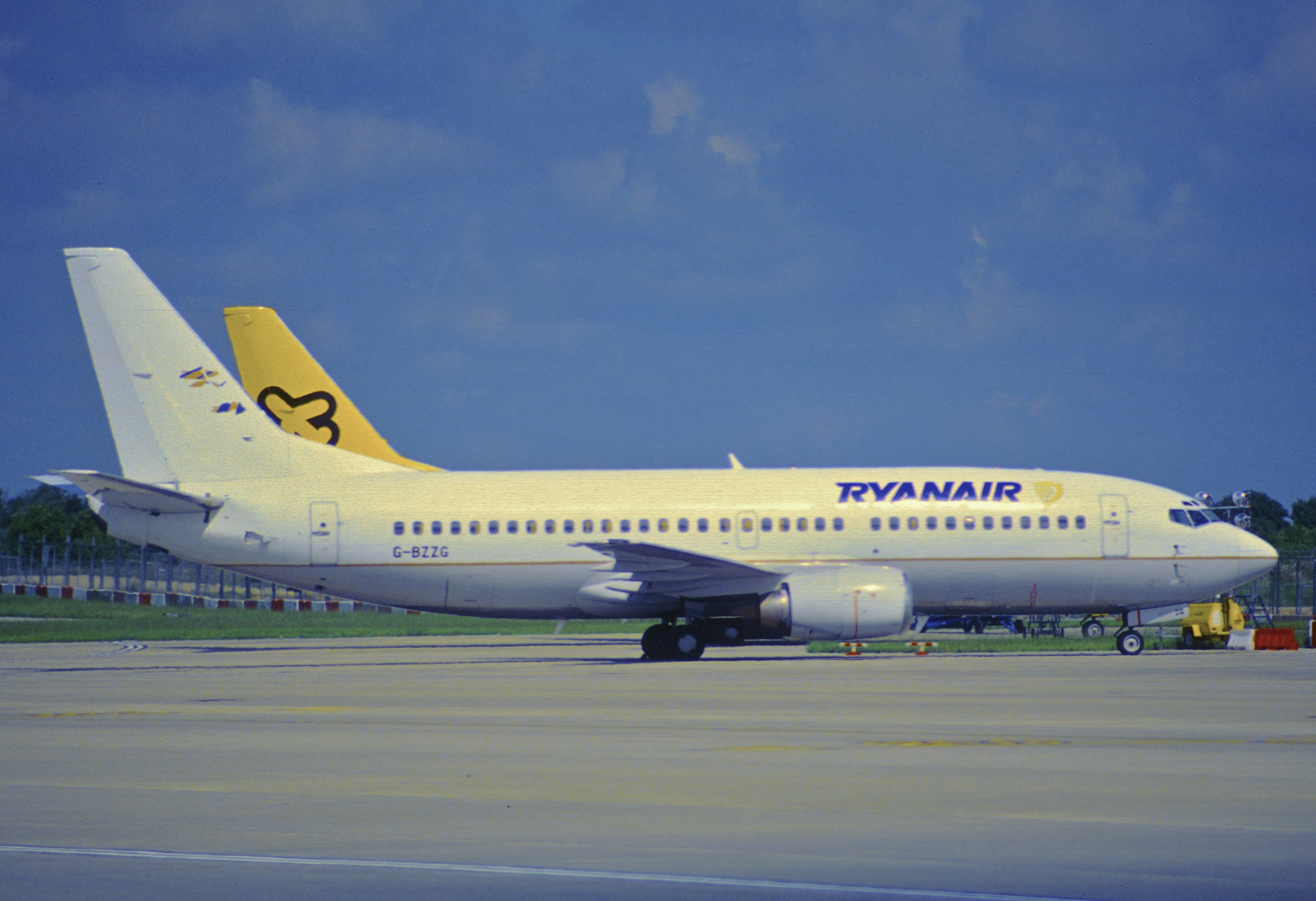
A former Ryanair 737-300 with a Continental Airlines hybrid livery in 2003

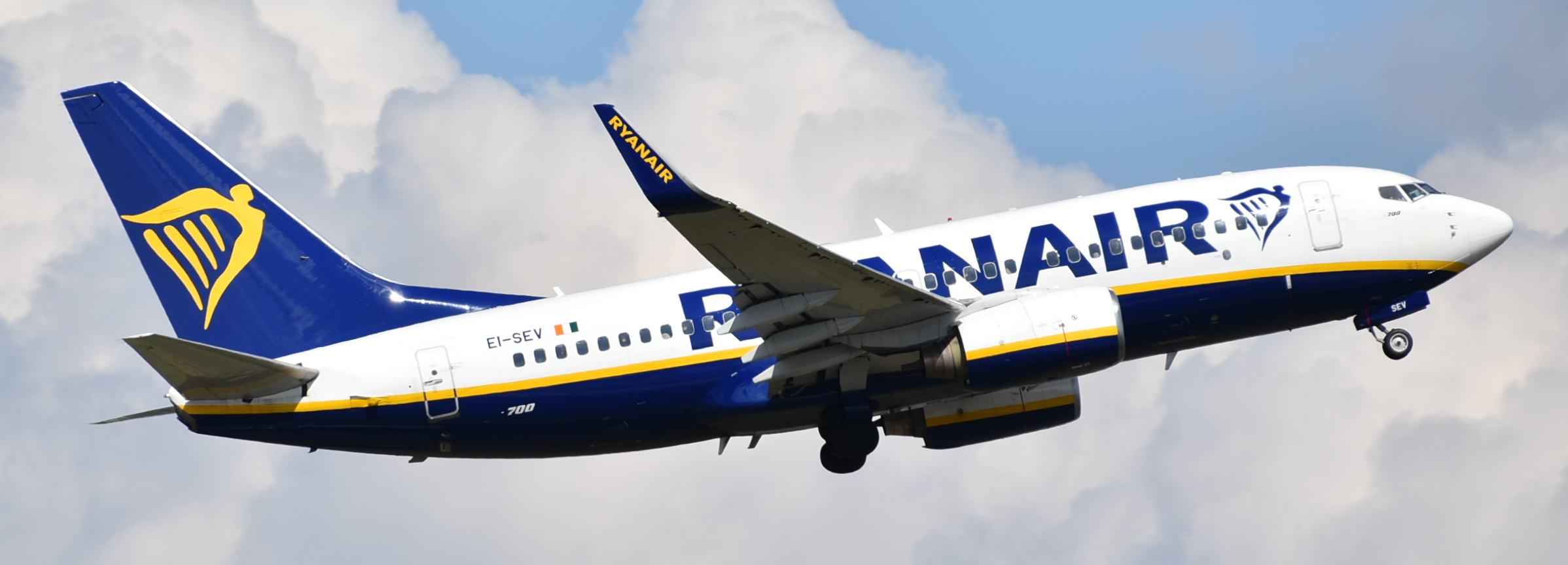
The sole Ryanair Boeing 737-700

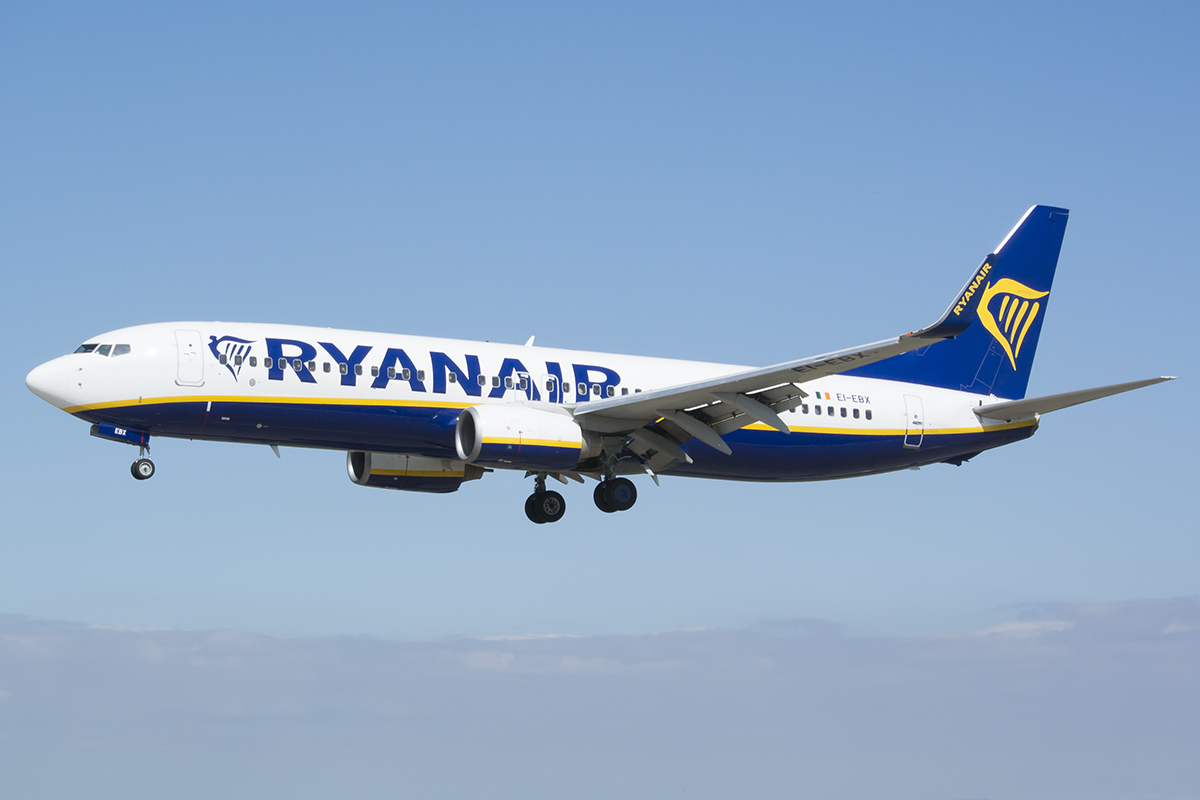
Ryanair Boeing 737-800

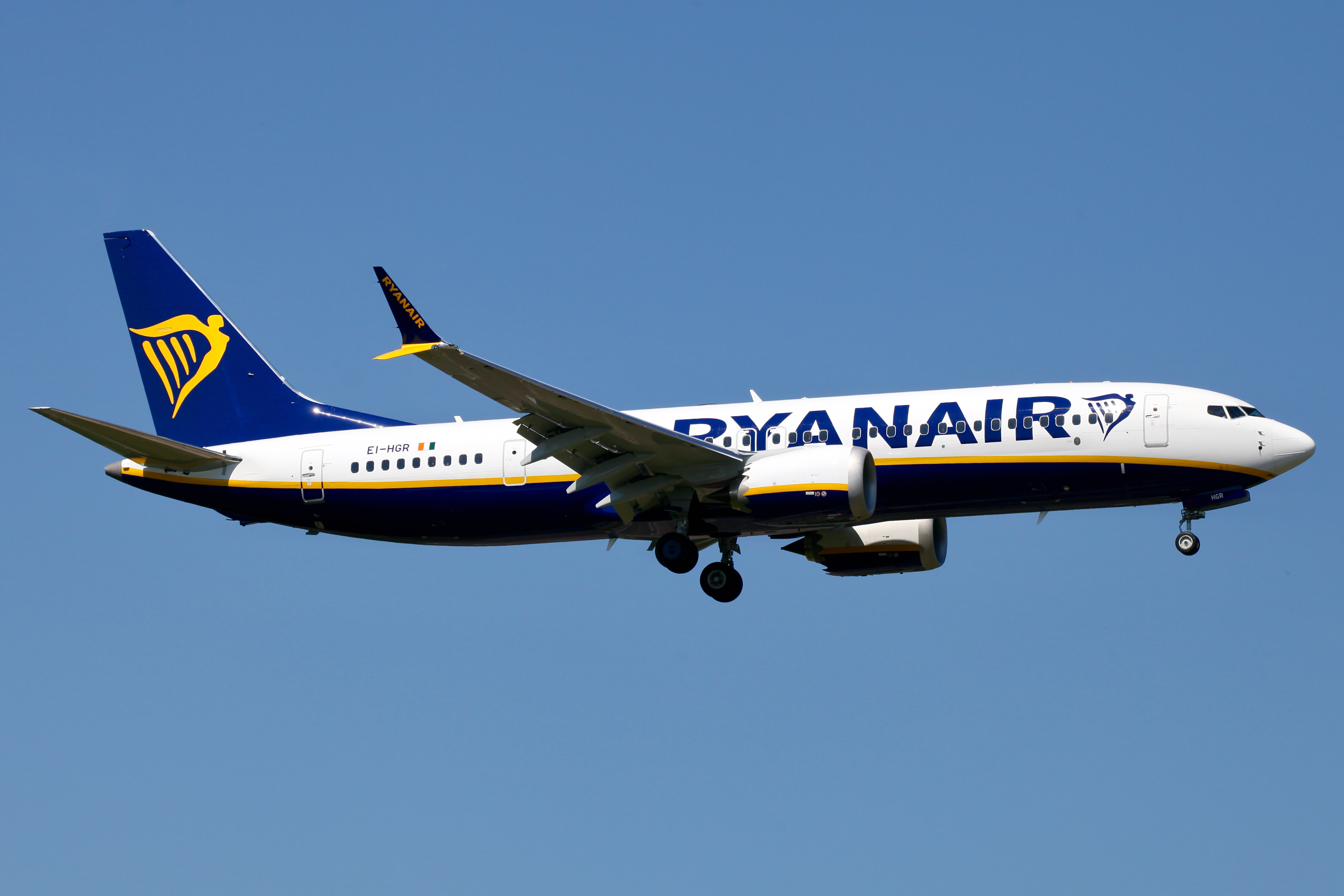
Ryanair Boeing 737 MAX 200

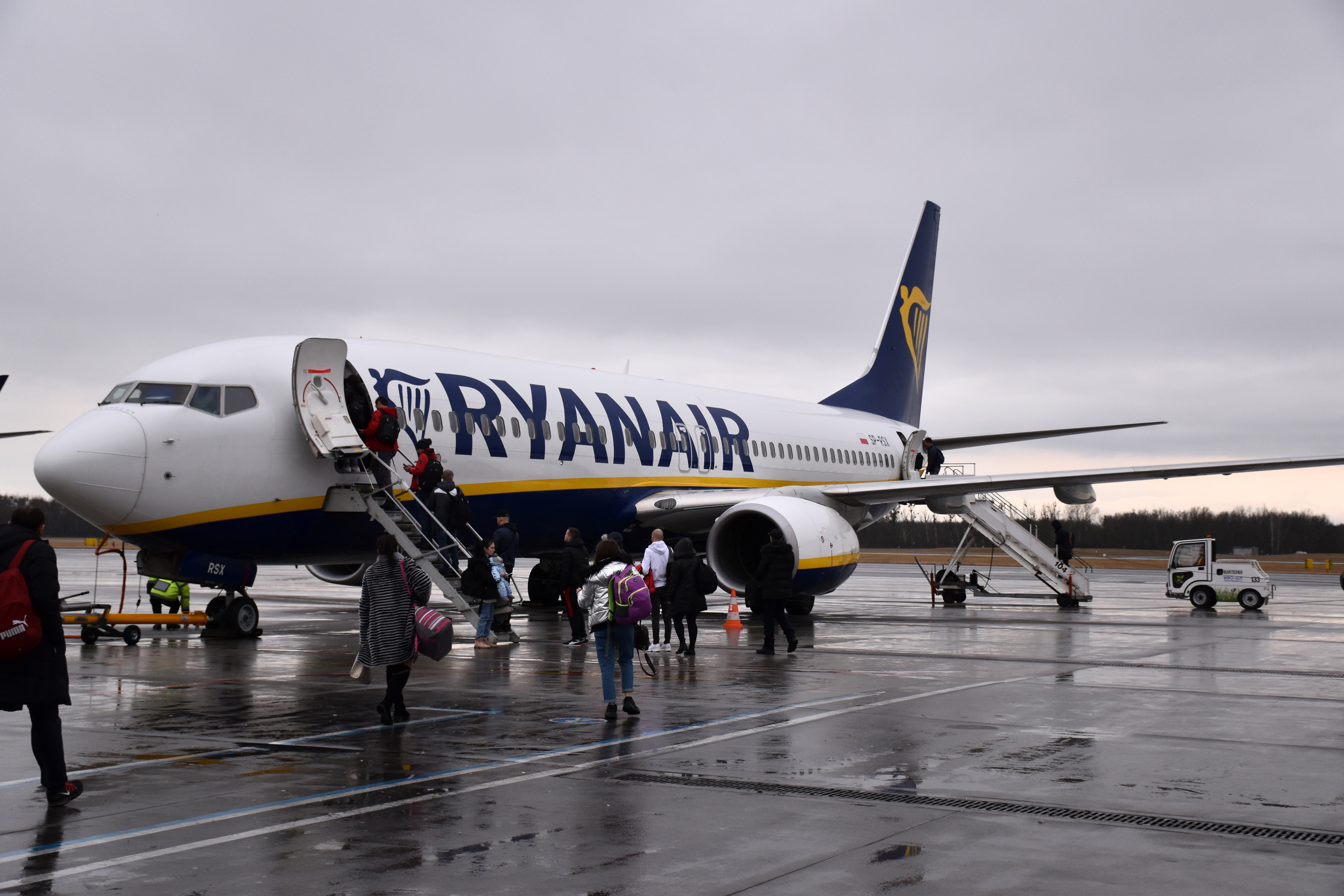
Ryanair 737 boarding using built-in forward airstairs and rear boarding stairs

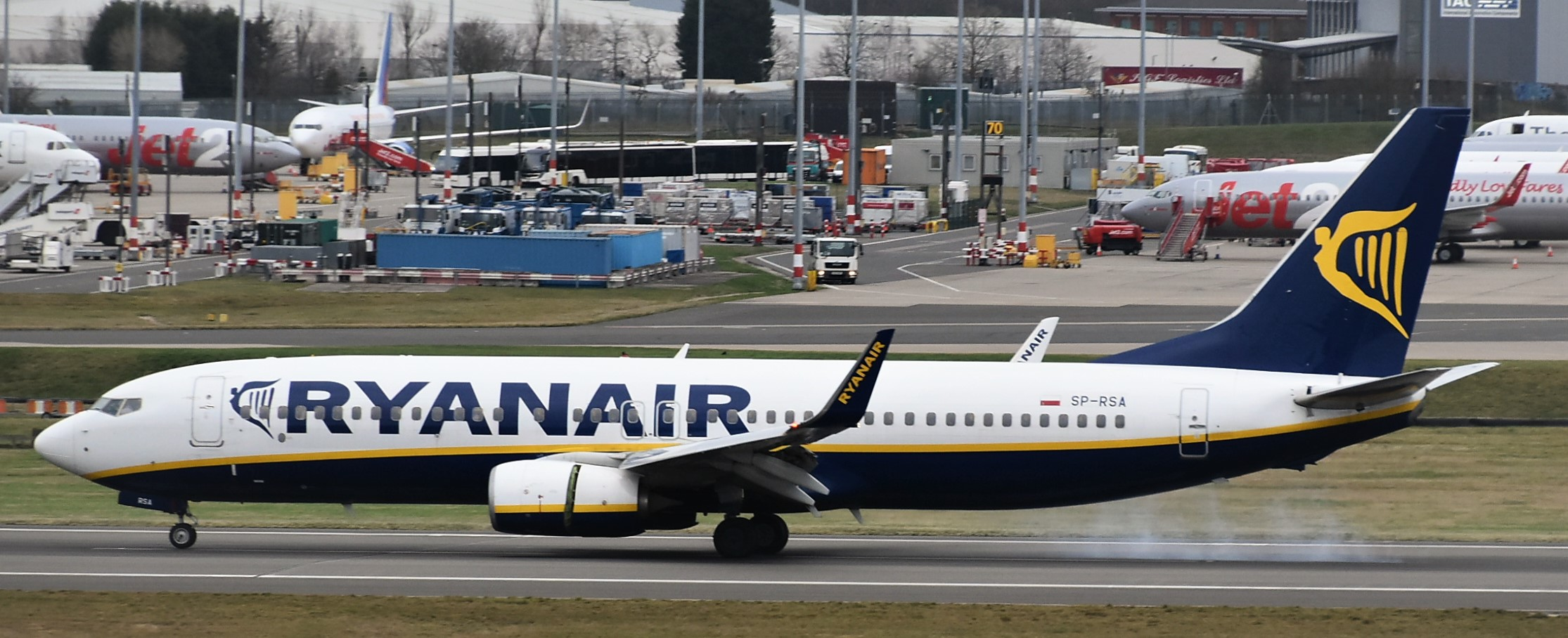
Boeing 737-800 with Ryanair livery

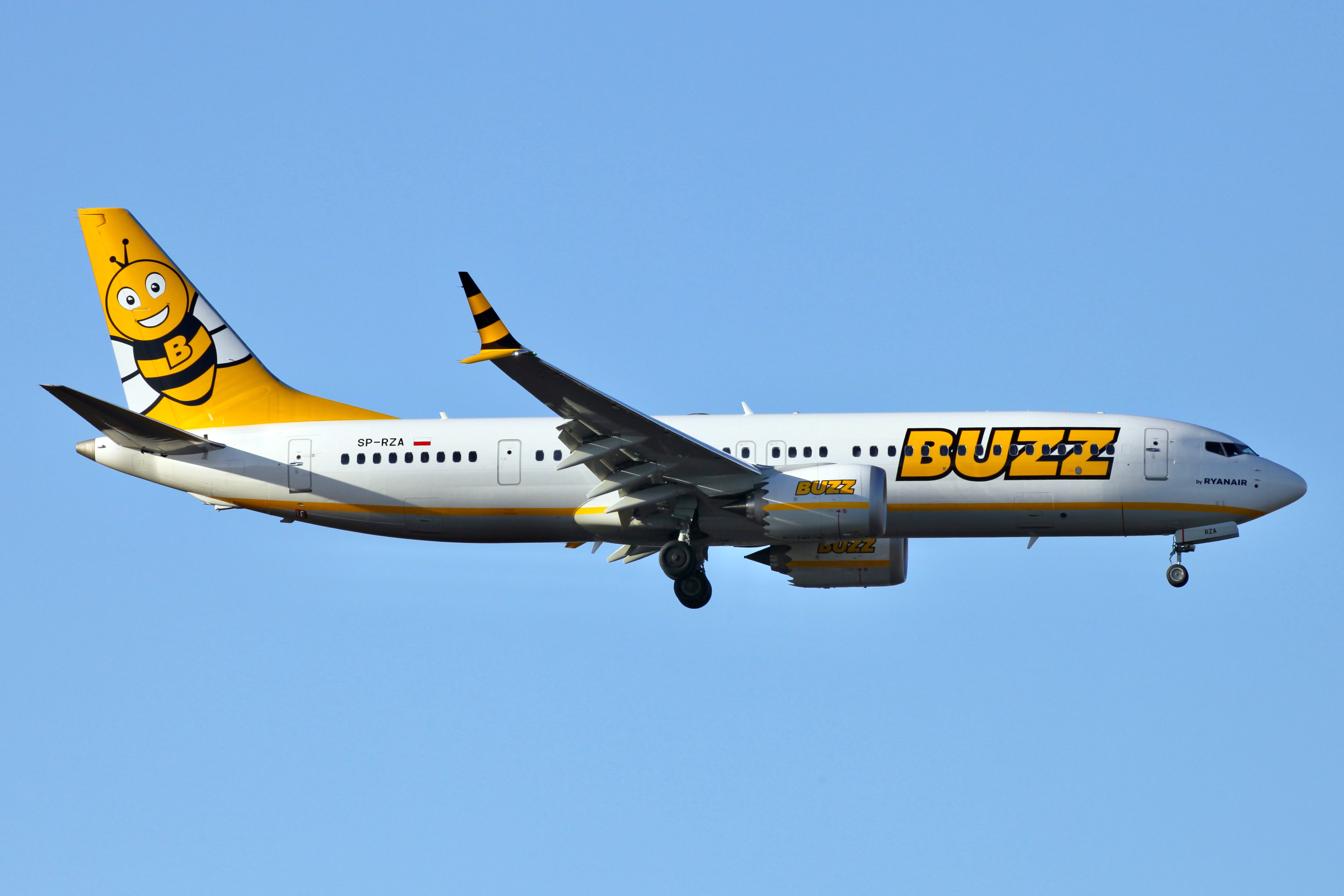
Boeing 737 MAX 200 with Buzz livery

== See also ==
- List of airlines
- List of companies of Ireland
- List of low-cost airlines
- Ryanair Pilot Group

== Further viewing ==
- Watch Turbulence - The Story of Ryanair. RTÉ. 2026.
