= Ryanair UK =

Low-cost airline of the United Kingdom

Ryanair UK Limited
- Ryanair UK Boeing 737-800
IATA	ICAO	Call sign
RK	RUK	BLUE MAX
- Founded: 30 May 1985; 41 years ago
- Commenced operations: 12 March 2019; 7 years ago
- AOC #: 2451
- Operating bases: Belfast; Edinburgh; London Stansted; Manchester
- Fleet size: 15
- Destinations: 93
- Parent company: Ryanair Holdings plc
- Headquarters: London Stansted Airport
- Profit: ▲£5.64 million (2023/24)
- Website: ryanair.com

Ryanair UK Limited is a British low-cost airline which is the UK subsidiary of the low-cost Irish airline group Ryanair Holdings, operating alongside Ryanair, Buzz, Malta Air and Lauda Europe. It commenced operations in March 2019. It operates Boeing 737-800 and Boeing 737 MAX 8-200 aircraft.

== History ==
Ryanair UK was founded on 30 May 1985 as Dawndell Limited and was renamed Ryan Air UK Limited on 27 June 1985. Since 1 November 1995, the company has been called Ryanair UK Limited.

In a statement dated 2 January 2018, Ryanair announced that its subsidiary Ryanair UK filed an application with the Civil Aviation Authority for an air operator's certificate on 21 December 2017, in anticipation of a potential "hard Brexit". Its first Boeing 737-800, registered as G-RUKA, was transferred to Ryanair UK in December 2018. The airline received an air operator's certificate from the Civil Aviation Authority on 3 January 2019 and commenced operations on behalf of Ryanair on 12 March 2019. Ryanair UK received its second 737-800 ex-Buzz SP-RKA now registered as G-RUKB, registering it on 10 March 2021. By October 2022, the airline had eight aircraft based at Stansted and Manchester. Two more aircraft were transferred in October 2021. As of 2025, the company had 15 aircraft.

In December 2020, the company claimed that new CAA rules had led to Ryanair cancelling 12 routes. The CAA responded that they had not changed their policy.

Ryanair UK's first Boeing 737 MAX 8-200, G-RYMA, was delivered new in December 2025. The Financial Times had earlier reported that registering new planes in the UK could avoid EU tariffs. One of the 800W aircraft was transferred to Buzz, maintaining Ryanair UK's fleet size at 15.

== Fleet ==
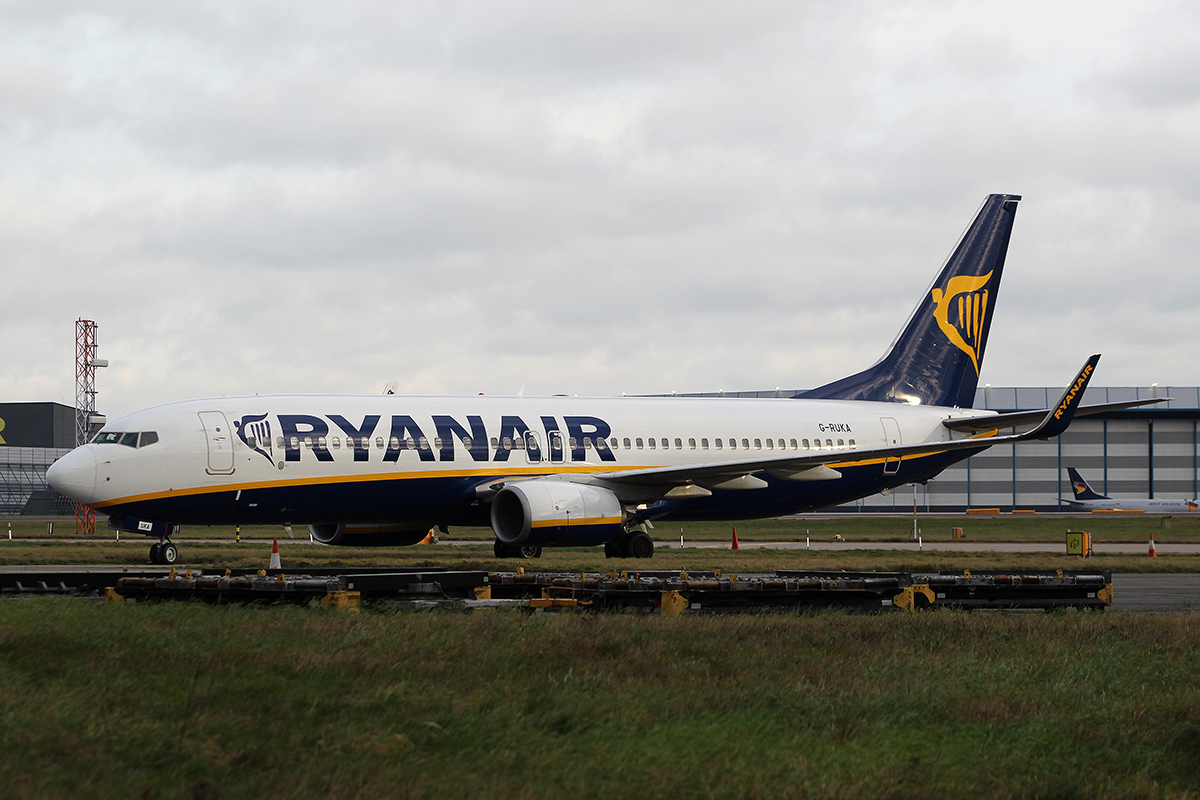
Ryanair UK Boeing 737-800

As of December 2025, Ryanair UK operates an all-Boeing 737 fleet composed of the following aircraft:

Ryanair UK fleet
Aircraft	In service	Orders	Passengers
Boeing 737-800	14	—	189
Boeing 737 MAX 8-200	1	—	197
Total	15	—	

== Destinations ==
As of November 2023, Ryanair uses the UK AOC on domestic flights within the UK, and flights connecting the UK with the European Union, Europe and Morocco. Ryanair UK serves 29 countries on 148 routes. As of summer 2023, the airline had four bases at London Stansted Airport, Manchester Airport, Edinburgh Airport and Belfast International Airport. The Belfast base opened in summer 2023.
