= Tony Ryan =

Irish philanthropist and businessman (1936-2007)

- Born: 2 February 1936; Limerick Junction, County Tipperary, Ireland
- Died: 3 October 2007 (aged 71); Celbridge, County Kildare, Ireland
- Known for: Co-founder of Ryanair, part-owner of Tiger Airways, multimillionaire and benefactor
- Children: 3

Thomas Anthony Ryan (2 February 1936 – 3 October 2007) was an Irish billionaire businessman and philanthropist who co-founded Ryanair in 1984 along with cofounders Christy Ryan and Liam Lonergan (owner of Irish travel agent Club Travel), 9 years after founding Guinness Peat Aviation an international aircraft leasing industry. Through Guinness Peat Aviation and Ryanair, he amassed two fortunes by identifying gaps in the market. Ryanair was believed to be the main source of his wealth in later life: the company became one of the biggest airlines in Europe and was worth approximately $13 billion at the time of his death.

== Early life ==
Ryan was born at Limerick Junction, County Tipperary on 2 February 1936; his father was a train driver. Around 1945 the family moved to Thurles in the same county, and he attended the Christian Brothers school there. His hopes of attending university were ended by the death of his father, and instead he joined Aer Lingus as a dispatch clerk, and was selected as a management trainee.

== Business career ==
Ryan progressed through station manager roles to become, in 1968, Aer Lingus station manager at JFK Airport, New York. The family returned to Ireland in 1972, where by chance he filled a vacancy in aircraft leasing, finding uses for aircraft that were surplus to the airline's requirements during the cyclical downturn.

In 1975, with financial support from Aer Lingus and the Guinness Peat Group, he founded the aircraft leasing company Guinness Peat Aviation (later GPA Group), raising $5,000 for his 10% shareholding. GPA grew to be the world's biggest aircraft lessor, its activities including wet leasing. The company was worth $4 billion at its peak, but its value dramatically collapsed in 1992 after the cancellation of its planned IPO. Ryan made €55m from the sale of AerFi (the successor to GPA) in 2000.

Ryan was one of the co-founders of Ryanair in 1984. Michael O'Leary joined Ryanair in 1988 as chief financial officer (CFO), becoming chief executive officer (CEO) in 1994.

Two of Ryan's associates went on to become billionaires: O'Leary through Ryanair, and Denis O'Brien, who started his career as Ryan's personal assistant, through independent business ventures.

== Other investments ==
In 2001, Ryan acquired Castleton Farm near Lexington, Kentucky from the Van Lennep Family Trust. Ryan renamed it Castleton Lyons after his Irish estate Lyons Demesne, and undertook renovations to the property while returning to its original roots as a thoroughbred operation.

At the time of his death he owned 16% of Tiger Airways, a discount carrier based in Singapore which was founded in December 2003.

He was a major shareholder in Château Lascombes near Bordeaux until his death. Other investments included Newcourt, Paddy Power, Providence, Tesco, Tullow Oil and UTV, and shares in private companies Conficius and Ginko Investments.

== Philanthropy ==
Ryan was an active and innovative funder of university education in Ireland. He donated a marine science institute to NUI Galway in 1993 which was named the Martin Ryan Marine Science Institute in honour of his father. He showed interest in marine science and aquaculture development in the west of Ireland. He also funded The Ryan Academy for Entrepreneurship at the Citywest park, that is run by Dublin City University.

== Personal life ==
Ryan married his childhood sweetheart, Mairéad, in 1958 and they had three sons together. The couple separated while the boys were young but they were not divorced.

Ryan then began a series of affairs with well-connected women, beginning in the mid-1980s with Lady Miranda Guinness, who had earlier separated from her husband Benjamin Guinness, 3rd Earl of Iveagh. Miranda tutored him in matters such as art collecting, fine wines, interior decoration and formal entertaining, and they worked together on redesigning the interior of a Georgian house which Ryan had bought in Pelham Place, South Kensington, London. The relationship ended around 1991 but they remained close friends.

Later relationships included the Irish fashion designer Louise Kennedy, and the interior designer Tiggy Butler, who oversaw the redesigns at two of Ryan's properties: Lyons Demesne (County Kildare) and Castleton Farm (Lexington, Kentucky). He spent more than €100 million on the restoration of Lyons Demesne. His last partner, up to the time of his death, was Martine Head, daughter of French horse trainer and breeder Alec Head; together they shared a passion for horse-racing.

Ryan was a tax exile who lived in Monte Carlo, but also owned a stud farm near his home in Dolla, County Tipperary. He was the 7th wealthiest individual from Ireland in the Sunday Times Rich List 2007 with over €1.5bn (£1bn).

== Death ==
Ryan died at his home Lyons Demesne in County Kildare on 3 October 2007, aged 71, following an 18-month illness with pancreatic cancer. He had other homes in London, Castleton Lyons stud in Kentucky, and on Ibiza. His estate was worth more than €95 million at his death. In his will he left more than €20 million to his estranged wife Mairéad, and more than €6 million to Martine Head. He also left Château Lascombes wine worth €3 million. Most of his wealth had already been entrusted to his children before his death.

His eldest son, Cathal, died three months later, aged 48, after being diagnosed with cancer.

== Awards and honours ==
- 1994, Order of the Aztec Eagle
- 2002, Golden Plate Award of the American Academy of Achievement – presented at the International Achievement Summit in Dublin, Ireland
- 2012, National Aviation Award: the inaugural award was presented to his family by Minister for Transport Leo Varadkar

Ryan held honorary doctorates from several universities, including Trinity College, Dublin, the National University of Ireland, Galway and the University of Limerick.
