= Christopher Ryan (aviation executive) =

Irish aviation executive (1936-2007)

Christy Ryan
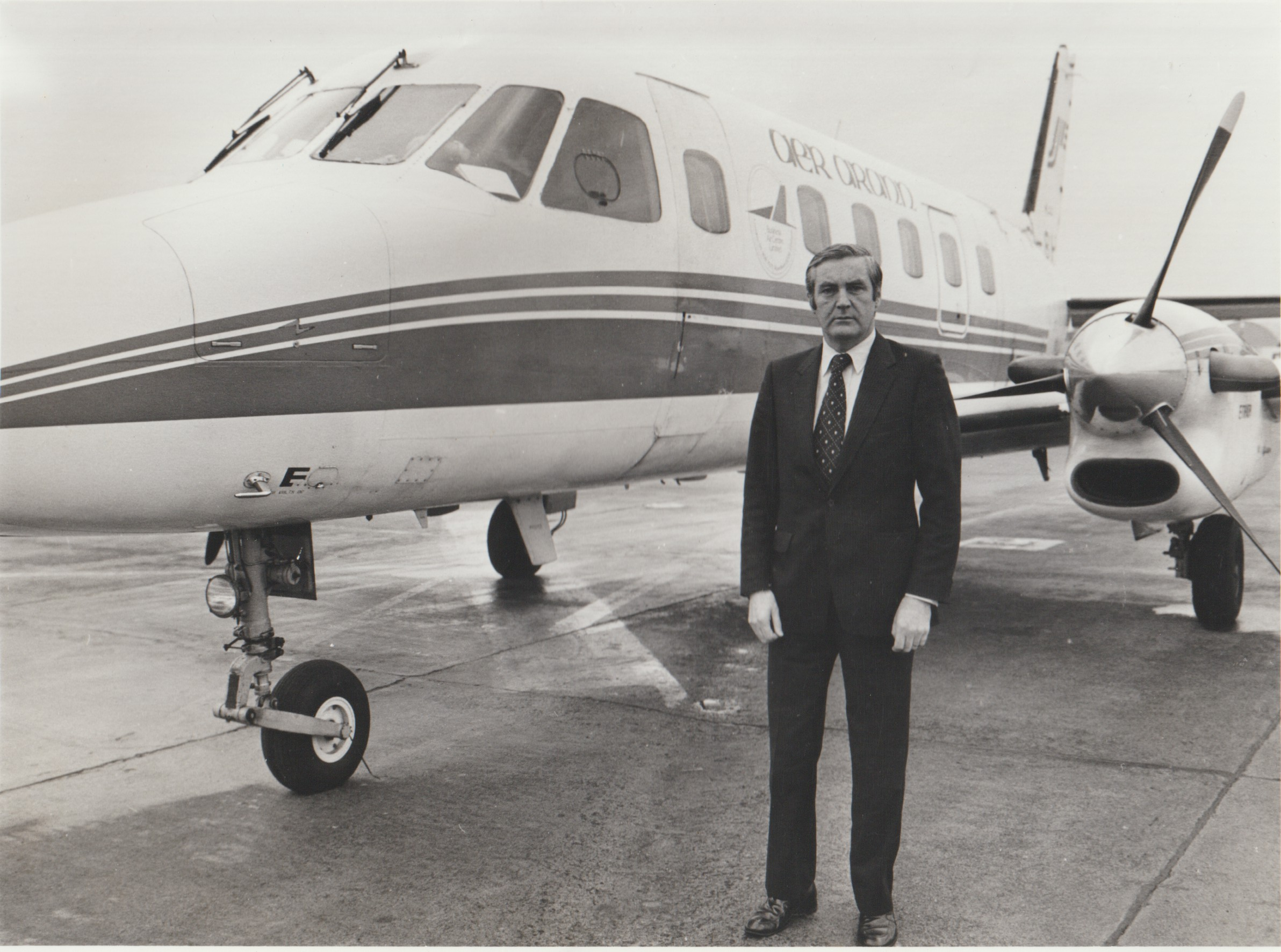
- Ryan in 1982 at Connemara Airport
- Born: Christopher Ryan; 12 December 1936; Kilsheelan, County Tipperary, Ireland
- Died: 14 March 2007 (aged 70); Waterford, Ireland
- Education: CBS High School Clonmel, County Tipperary
- Occupation: Aviation executive
- Known for: Co-founder and first managing director of Ryanair

Christopher Ryan (12 December 1936 – 14 March 2007) was an Irish aviation executive. Ryan was a co-founder of Ryanair, Ireland’s first low-fare airline, and served as its first managing director during the company’s establishment, playing a pivotal role in the early years of Ryanair's development.

Christy Ryan was a colleague and close friend of Tony Ryan, another businessman involved with Ryanair's creation, along with Liam Lonergan, owner of a travel agency. Despite sharing the same surname they were not related.

== Early career at Aer Lingus ==
Christy Ryan was born in 1936 and grew up in Kilsheelan, County Tipperary, around 40 km from Waterford. His first job in 1956, after leaving school, was with Aer Lingus at Shannon Airport, where he was employed as a traffic assistant. At the time Shannon Airport was an important hub for transatlantic aviation, and Aer Lingus ran its North Atlantic services from there.

While working at Shannon Airport he met Tony Ryan, a few months older than Christy Ryan, and also from Tipperary but unrelated to Christy. Tony Ryan started work for Aer Lingus, in the dispatch team, on the same day as Christy. They became very close friends, a friendship that continued for over 30 years. Christy Ryan was godfather to Tony Ryan's second son, Declan Ryan, who as an adult was to have a key role in Ryanair.

Tony Ryan was promoted to a supervisory role just before Christy Ryan, but Christy's own career in Aer Lingus began to develop. He was posted to London and in 1968 to New York, where he was to become Aer Lingus' station manager at John F. Kennedy International Airport, a high profile role in an airline that had a significant passenger and cargo operation between Ireland and New York.

== Guinness Peat Aviation ==
In 1975 Aer Lingus participated in a joint venture with Guinness Peat Group, a London based financial services company, to create Guinness Peat Aviation (GPA), an aircraft leasing company with a global remit. Tony Ryan was an investor and chief executive of the new company. Christy Ryan was seconded over by Aer Lingus to GPA, and in 1977 he formally left Aer Lingus to join GPA as a permanent staff member. Christy Ryan became GPA's vice president for the Middle East, based in Tehran. In that role he facilitated the evacuation of Irish airline staff caught up in the upheavals of the Iranian Revolution in November 1978. In 1980 Ryan returned to Ireland, having resigned from GPA.

== Aer Arann ==
Ryan was appointed general manager of Aer Arann Islands in August 1982. Aer Arann was an airline based at Connemara Airport near Galway, that mainly served the Aran Islands off the west coast of Ireland. Aer Lingus, the state owned company, at this time had an effective monopoly on Ireland's key domestic and international routes, as a result of Ireland's tight regulation of civil airlines. In March 1983 Ryan obtained operating licences for Aer Arann, allowing flights between Shannon and Manchester, Bristol and Cardiff airports in the United Kingdom. This was seen as a significant shift of Ireland's aviation regulatory framework, given it was the first time that Aer Lingus' monopoly on routes to Britain had been broken. The airline's then owner, Tim Kilroe, ultimately decided not to proceed with operating these services, despite holding a licence to do so, which in turn inhibited Ryan's ambitions to expand the airline. Ryan left Aer Arann in 1984.

== The launch of Ryanair ==
After leaving Aer Arann Ryan developed a proposal for a new low‑fare airline to challenge Aer Lingus. He entered into discussions with Tony Ryan and Liam Lonergan, who were to become the three founders of Ryanair. They initially arranged the incorporation of Danren Enterprises as the shareholding structure for the new company, with Tony Ryan's sons holding the majority stake, and Christy Ryan holding 10% of the shares. Christy Ryan was appointed the company's first managing director.

The airline's name was a point of contention since Tony Ryan was nervous of being seen to be too compromised with the new airline. He was still involved with Guinness Peat Aviation, with its links back to Aer Lingus. Consequently Tony Ryan's financial involvement was channelled through his three sons, and Tony's initial idea was to call the airline Trans-Tipperary. Christy Ryan suggested that branding the fledgling airline as Ryanair would make more sense in that the Ryan family name added credibility. Tony Ryan eventually agreed, and Christy then submitted the paperwork to rename Danren Enterprises to Ryanair and applied for operating licences.

As managing director Christy Ryan oversaw Ryanair’s regulatory applications, operational setup, staffing, and early route development, including the airline’s first scheduled service on 8 July 1985, on a route that Ryan had deliberately chosen. This was a Monday to Friday service from Waterford to London Gatwick airport, using a 15 seater Embraer Bandeirante, with ticket prices below that of Aer Lingus' typical fares for services between Ireland and Britain. In addition to this being Ryanair's first scheduled flight, it was also the first time Waterford had an international route.

Throughout the late 1980s he held senior operational and board roles at Ryanair, as the airline continued to expand, before being seconded in 1990 as managing director of Waterford Airport. In July 1992 the taoiseach Albert Reynolds opened a IR£1 million terminal building, in August Ryanair withdrew all services from Waterford citing the recession in the aviation business.

== Falling out with Ryanair ==
In 1997 Ryan started legal proceedings against Ryanair, claiming £30 million as equivalent to his shareholding at the time of Ryanair's floatation in May 1997. Ryan had invested £50,000 in Ryanair, mainly at the time of the company's startup. Ryanair did not accept that they owed anything to Ryan, since Ryan had agreed to participate in a company-wide buyback of his shares in 1991, when he received £57,000 back. Up against the airline's legal resources, and after an inconclusive meeting with his godson Declan Ryan, Christy Ryan quietly ended proceedings, while remaining unhappy with the outcome.

== Later life ==
Christy Ryan continued to provide consultancy services to the aviation industry until retirement. After he left Waterford Airport, which has a runway too short for jet aircraft, he was critical of what he termed "parish pump politics" that stifled the potential of a successful airport serving the south east of Ireland. He advocated relocating the airport south of Kilkenny with its better proximity to the road network. He died in March 2007, aged 70 years, a few months before Tony Ryan's death.

== Legacy ==
Ryanair went on to become Europe's largest airline, by passenger numbers. Christy Ryan believed that Ryanair was his idea and was unhappy about the lack of acknowledgement. That became publicly evident in the comparisons that were made by newspapers after Tony Ryan's death in November 2007. Ray Webster, former chief executive of the rival airline easyJet, wrote in Management Today that Christy Ryan's claim to have founded Ryanair rather than Tony Ryan "might be swimming against the tide of established folklore." Nevertheless Christy Ryan's operational and administrative competence, when the airline was vulnerable as a single aircraft operator, was a significant contribution to Ryanair's future success.
