= AirExplore =

Slovak airline

IATA	ICAO	Call sign
ED	AXE	GALILEO
- Founded: 2008; 18 years ago
- Ceased operations: 10 November 2026
- Hubs: Bratislava Airport
- Fleet size: 12
- Parent company: Avia Solutions Group
- Headquarters: Bratislava, Slovakia
- Website: https://airexplore.aero

AirExplore was a Slovak charter airline headquartered and based at Bratislava Airport. The airline was IOSA certified and was a member of AIR-E, Airlines International Representation in Europe.

The company was part of Avia Solutions Group, a global aviation business group.

== Operations ==
AirExplore operated a fleet of eight passenger aircraft and four cargo aircraft, all Boeing 737-800. The airline specialised in leasing (ACMI) its aircraft to many different airlines around the world, mainly for seasonal operations, but it also operated chartered flights for tour operators, sports teams and other companies.

The airline started operations in 2010 with a single Boeing 737-400 aircraft. It expanded its fleet by adding a Boeing 737-300 aircraft to it in 2011, before introducing an additional three Boeing 737-400 aircraft until 2014. Between 2014 and 2019, it gradually updated its fleet to only include Boeing 737-800 aircraft.

In July 2020, the airline introduced scheduled flights between Bratislava and Split, flying the route twice a week during the summer season. Since then, it has also operated scheduled flights between Košice and Zadar once a week during the summer season as well as between Bratislava and Stockholm every two weeks year-round. The scheduled flights have since been discontinued.

On 25 August 2022, the airline took delivery of its first cargo aircraft, a converted Boeing 737-800.

In June 2023, AirExplore was acquired by Avia Solutions Group.

On 10 November 2026, AirExplore ceased operations and submitted a request to surrender its air operator's certificate.

== Fleet ==
=== Final fleet ===
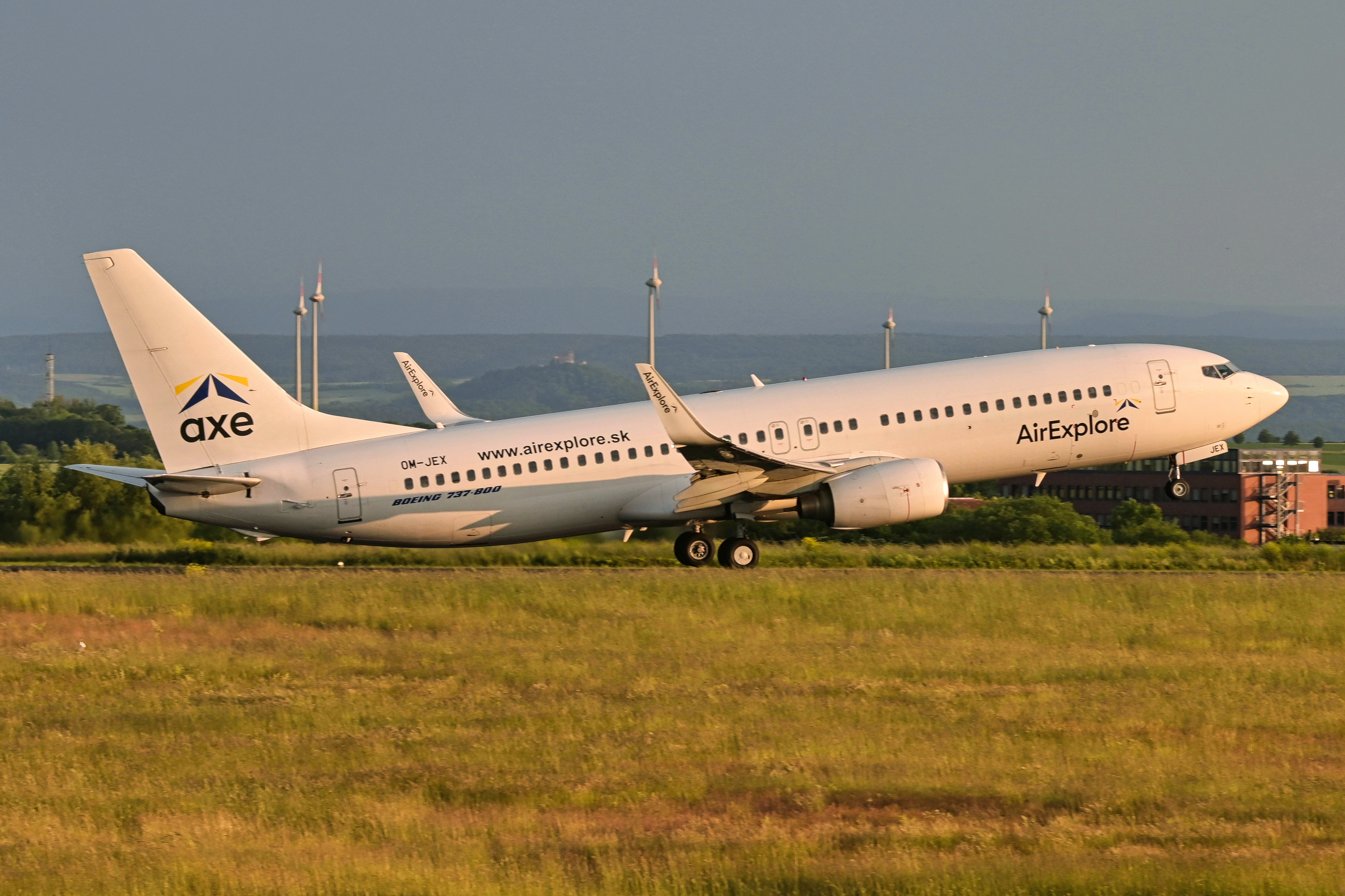
AirExplore Boeing 737-800

As of August 2025, AirExplore operated the following aircraft:

Final fleet
Aircraft	In fleet	Passengers
Boeing 737-800	8	189
Boeing 737-800BCF	1	Cargo
Boeing 737-800SF	3	Cargo
Total	12	
