= Lauda Europe =

Low-cost airline of Malta

- Lauda Europe A320-200 in standard livery
IATA	ICAO	Call sign
LW	LDA	BEAUFORT
- Founded: July 2020; 6 years ago
- Commenced operations: 13 September 2020; 6 years ago
- AOC #: MT-62
- Operating bases: Palma de Mallorca; Vienna; Zadar (Summer season); Zagreb
- Fleet size: 26
- Parent company: Ryanair Holdings
- Headquarters: Pietà, Malta
- Key people: David O’Brien (CEO)
- Website: www.laudaeurope.com

Lauda Europe Limited is a Maltese low-cost airline operating on behalf of its parent company Ryanair. The airline performs wet-lease flights for Ryanair and charter services.

== History ==
Lauda Europe is the successor of Austrian carrier Lauda. In 2020, Ryanair Holdings closed its Austrian unit in favor of Lauda Europe, a newly established Maltese subsidiary, and transferred Lauda's fleet of 29 Airbus A320 aircraft to the new airline. Lauda staff were offered new positions at Lauda Europe. The airline received its AOC and formally took flight in September 2020.

In May 2021, Ryanair Group CEO Michael O'Leary stated that Lauda may move to an all-Boeing 737 fleet. However, in July 2022, O'Leary announced that Ryanair would extend the Lauda Europe Airbus A320 leases until 2028. In 2024, O'Leary advised he would be looking to extend the leases further and eventually increase Lauda's fleet of Airbus narrow-bodies.

== Fleet ==
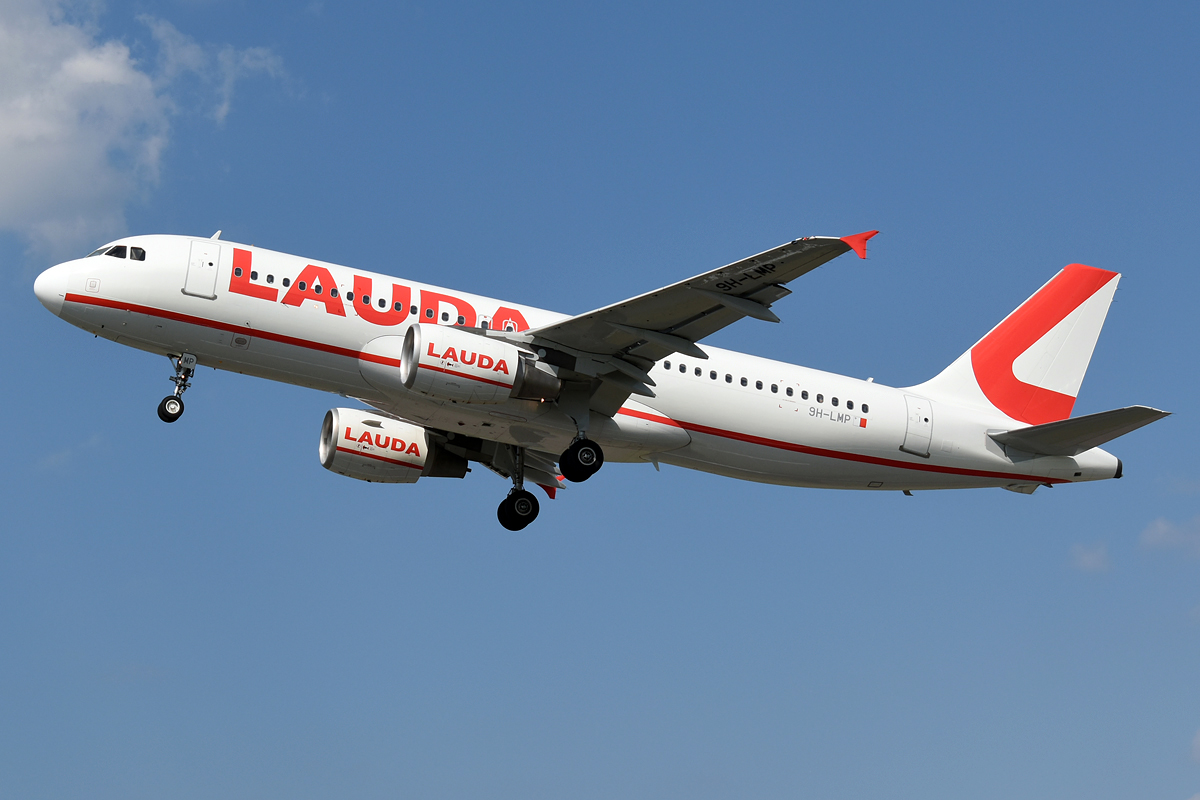
Lauda Europe Airbus A320-200

=== Current fleet ===
As of July 2026, Lauda Europe operates the following aircraft:

Lauda Europe fleet
Aircraft	In service	Orders	Passengers	Notes
Airbus A320-200	26	—	180	
Total	26	—		

=== Former fleet ===
As of August 2025, Lauda Europe operates 26 Airbus A320.

== Accidents and incidents ==
- On 23 June 2025, Ryanair flight FR111 from Palma de Mallorca to Berlin (operated by Lauda Europe) was forced to make an emergency landing in Marseille due to smoke developing onboard the aircraft, leading to respiratory irritation for passengers.

== See also ==
- List of airlines of Malta
