= Airbus A321neo =

2010s narrow-body airliner by Airbus

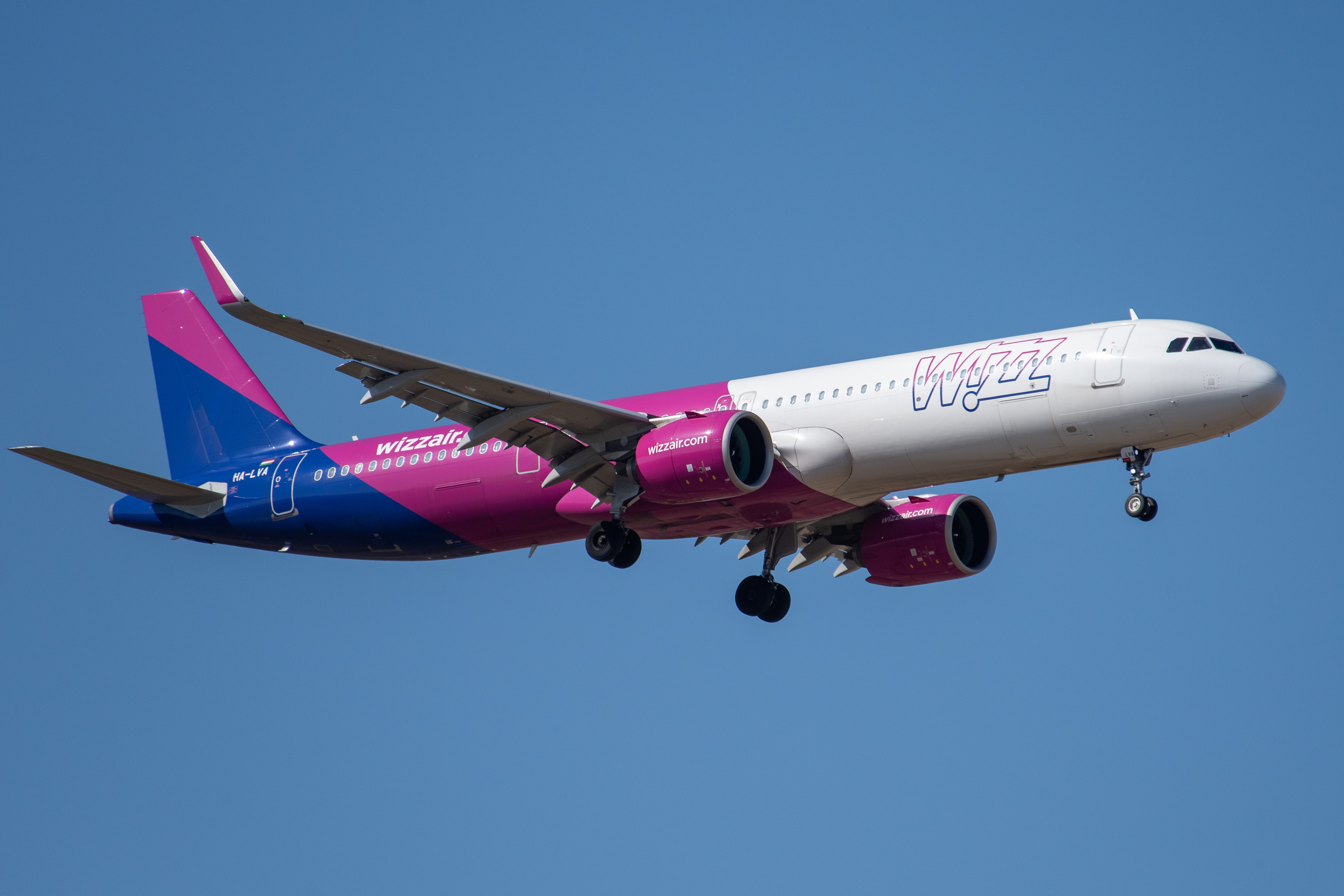
- An Airbus A321neo of Wizz Air, the largest operator of the type

General information
- Type: Single-aisle airliner
- National origin: Multi-national (Note: Final assembly in China, France, Germany and the United States.)
- Manufacturer: Airbus
- Status: In service
- Primary users: Wizz Air IndiGo; United Airlines; Delta Air Lines
- Number built: 1,752 as of June 2025

History
- Manufactured: 2014–present
- Introduction date: 31 May 2017, with Virgin America
- First flight: 9 February 2016
- Developed from: Airbus A321; Airbus A320neo family

The Airbus A321neo is a narrow-body single-aisle airliner created by Airbus. The A321neo (neo being an acronym for "new engine option") was developed from the Airbus A321 and is part of the Airbus A320neo family, alongside the A319neo and A320neo, being the longest member of the family. It typically seats 180 to 220 passengers in a two-class configuration, with up to 244 passengers in a high-density arrangement.

The A321neo was announced by Airbus in December 2010, as an improvement and replacement to the A321ceo. Fitted with new engines and sharklets as standard, the A321neo has the longest fuselage of any Airbus narrow-body airliner in commercial use. Available with either CFM International LEAP-1A or Pratt & Whitney PW1100G-JM engines, Airbus advertises a 20% increase in fuel efficiency per passenger, with 500 nautical miles (930 km; 580 mi) more range, or 2 tonnes (4,400 lb) more of payload. Boeing introduced a new generation of their competing narrowbody family, the 737 MAX, nine days before the introduction of the A321neo.

The A321neo has the same overall length as the A321ceo, with an increased fuel efficiency and performance rating. The A321neo has a range of 3,995 nautical miles (7,399 km), with an MTOW (maximum take-off weight) of 97 tonnes (214,000 lb), and its engine has 109 to 156 kN (24,500 to 35,000 lb) of thrust.

The A321neo began production in 2016, with final assembly taking place in Hamburg, Germany, as well as in Toulouse, France; Mobile, United States, and Tianjin, China. It entered service with Virgin America on 31 May 2017, taking its first commercial flight. As of June 2025, a total of 7,064 A321neo aircraft had been ordered by 88 disclosed customers, of which 1,752 aircraft had been delivered.

== Development ==
The A321neo's development was announced by Airbus in 2010, 16 years after the introduction of the original A321ceo.

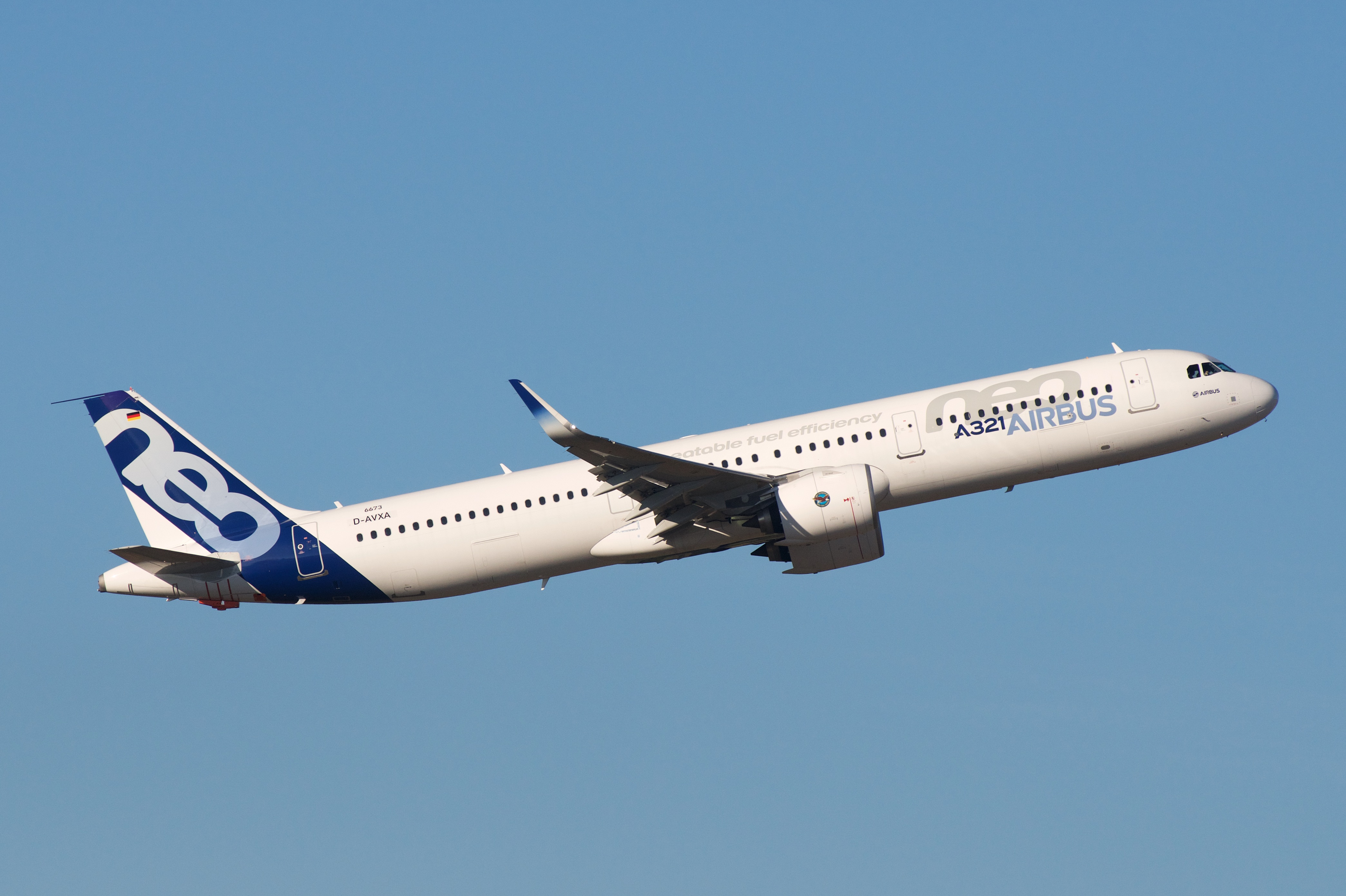
Airbus A321neo prototype

The first flight of the Airbus A321neo took place in Hamburg. The prototype, registered D-AVXB and equipped with CFM International LEAP-1A engines, was flown by test pilots Martin Scheuermann and Bernardo Saez Benito Hernandez. The flight lasted 29 minutes, and performed various tests during that time. AerCap was the first customer to order the aircraft on 27 April 2011, with IndiGo being the first airline to order the aircraft, on 22 June 2011, ordering 304 of the type. The first A321neo entered commercial service with Virgin America in May 2017, who merged with Alaska Airlines in 2018; the latter also acquired all of Virgin's aircraft.

It received its type certification with Pratt & Whitney engines on 15 December 2016, and simultaneous certification from the European Union Aviation Safety Agency (EASA) and Federal Aviation Administration (FAA) for the CFM LEAP-powered variant on 1 March 2017. The first A321neo, leased by GECAS, was delivered in Hamburg to Virgin America, configured with 185 seats and LEAP engines, and entered service on 31 May 2017.

=== Delivery delays ===
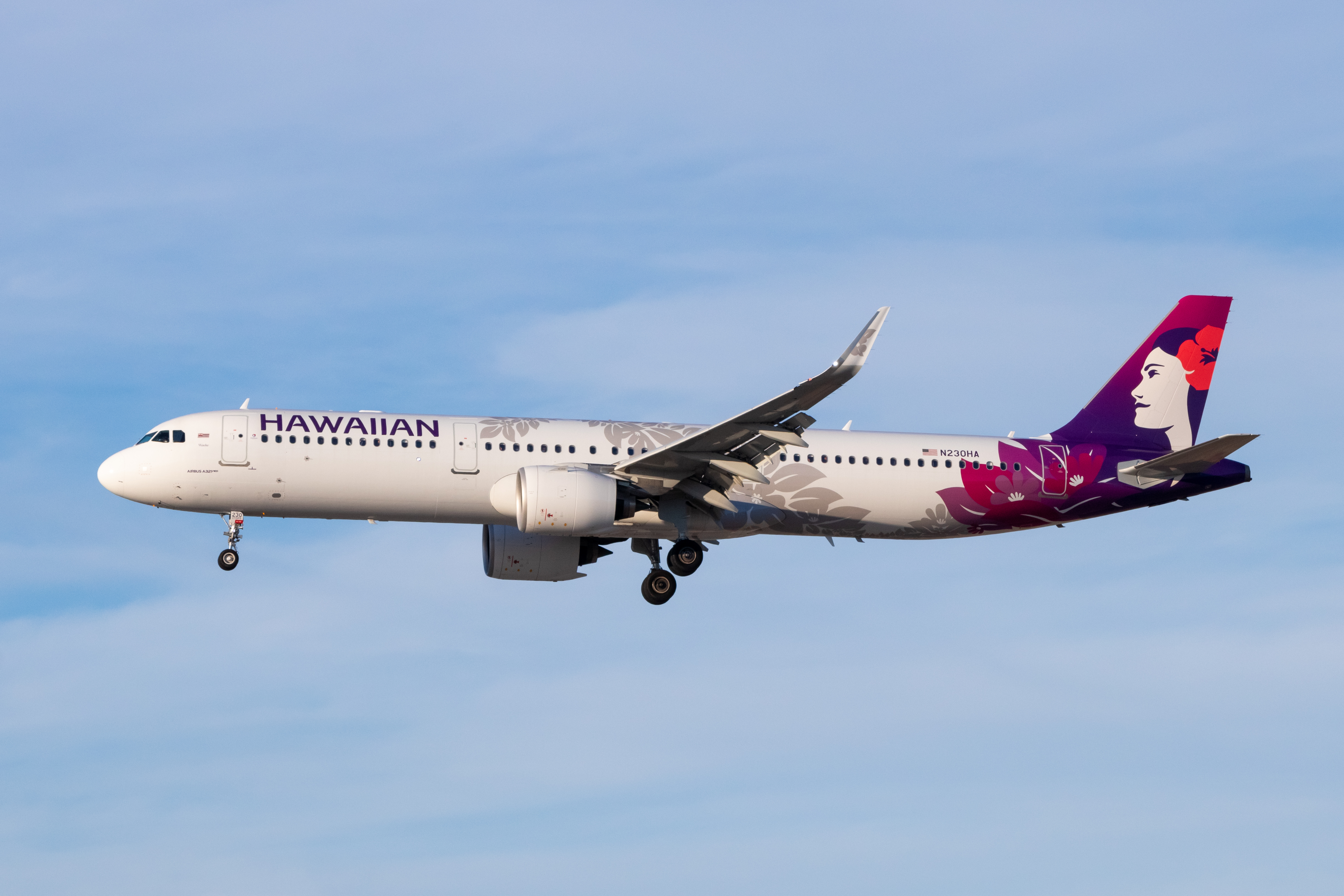
Hawaiian Airlines' A321neos were delivered late.

As Pratt & Whitney encountered early reliability issues with the PW1100G, retrofitting fixes affected the deliveries. Cebu Pacific was due to add its first three A321neos to its 40 A320ceos by the end of 2017 but agreed to postpone them; it was to receive seven A321ceos in 2018, starting in March, to upgauge A320 routes from the slot-constrained Manila Airport and redeploy some of its international A330s to shorter-haul routes. Air New Zealand has at least seven A321neos in its 13 A320-family orders, increasing seating capacity by 27% over A320ceos currently used on short-haul international routes, mainly to Australia; the neos were delayed until July 2018 for the A320neos and September 2018 for the A321neos with a new, higher density and some A320ceo leases to be extended for the interim.

Hawaiian's first two A321neos were planned to have been delivered in 2017 before its upcoming winter peak season but were postponed to early 2018, a "frustrating" and "irritating" delay, with another nine in 2018, mostly in the first half. They are intended to open up thinner routes to the U.S. mainland not viable with its widebodies, such as Portland to Maui, or better matched and allowing two routes to be expanded to daily service instead of seasonal, bypassing its Honolulu hub for half of the A321neo fleet.

Well suited for 2,100–2,300 nmi (3,900–4,300 km; 2,400–2,600 mi) routes to the US West Coast, Hawaiian's 189-seat A321neos are more efficient than the competing narrow-body aircraft and even have slightly lower per-seat costs than its 294-seat A330-200s.

== Design ==
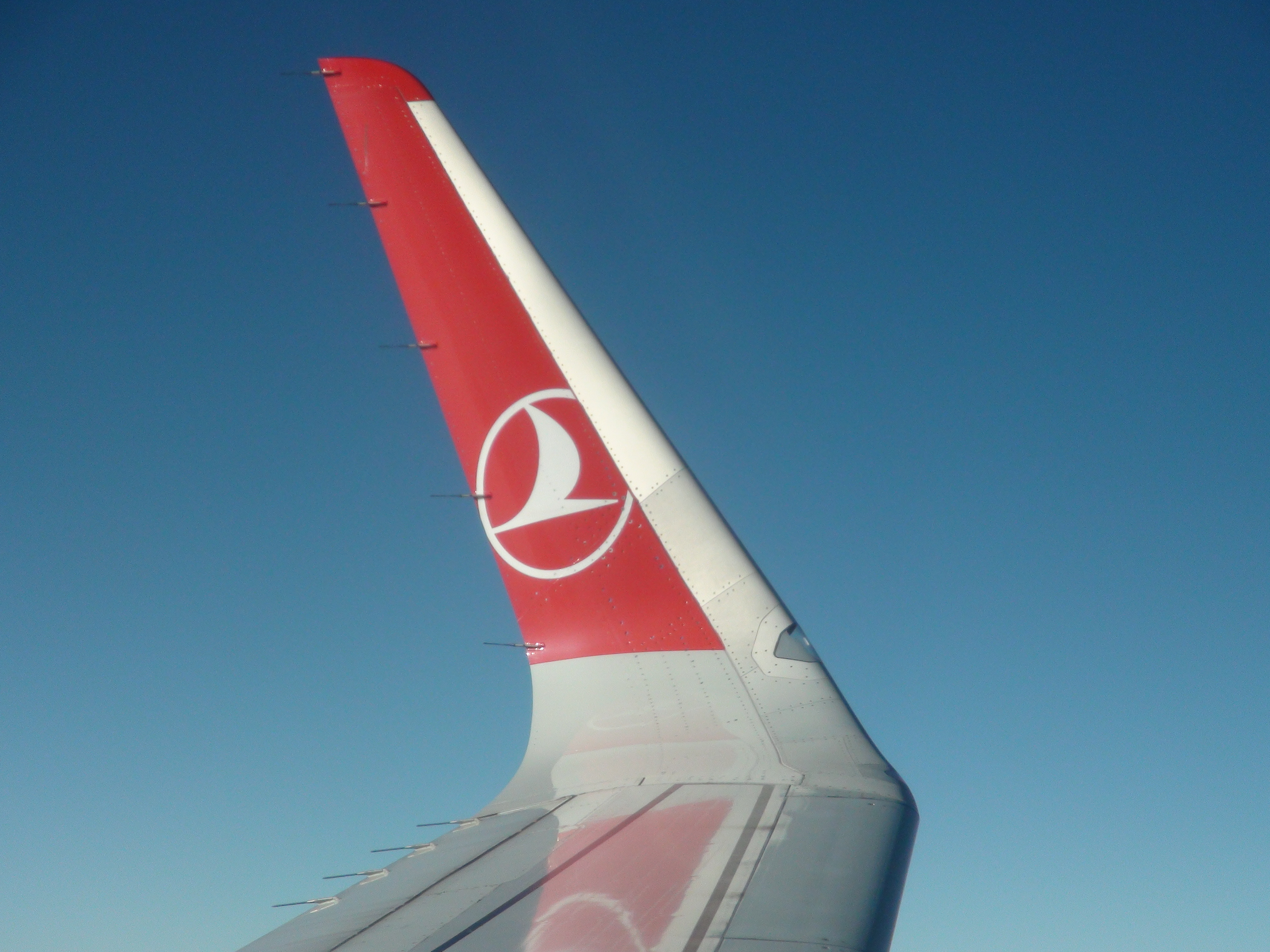
Sharklets on a Turkish Airlines A321neo

The A321neo is a narrow-body aircraft with a retractable tricycle landing gear, powered by two wing pylon-mounted turbofan engines. It is a low-wing cantilever monoplane with a conventional tail unit having a single vertical stabiliser and rudder. Changes from the A321ceo includes a new engine and extended fuselage fuel tanks. (Note: Details listed on Airbus A320 Family Facts and Figures June 2026 page 3).

=== Aircraft Cabin Flex (ACF) ===
Early A321neo aircraft retained the exit configuration of A321ceo with four pairs of doors, two forward of the wing and two aft.

In 2015, the Aircraft Cabin Flex (ACF) layout became available as an option. The ACF layout replaces the second pair of doors ahead of the wing (L2/R2) with two pairs of Type III+ overwing exits with dual lane slides designed to accommodate higher passenger flow and moves the third pair of doors (L3/R3), located aft of the wing, further aft.

The ACF layout gives operators flexibility to activate or deactivate exits based on their selected seating density. For lower-density layouts, the L3/R3 doors or one pair of overwing exits can be replaced with plugs, which are lighter and do not require door mechanisms or associated maintenance.

In higher-density configurations, maximum seating capacity increases from 220 to a theoretical exit limit of 250 passengers, although such a configuration has not been certified. Certification limits vary by regulator. The European Union Aviation Safety Agency (EASA) permits up to 244 passengers when using larger Type C* doors at both ends with dual lane slides, removing bulkhead walls, and relocating flight attendant jump seats to be deployed in front of the lavatory doors. The Federal Aviation Administration (FAA), by contrast, does not recognize these enhanced Type C* and Type III+ exit types and classifies them as standard Type C and Type III exits, limiting capacity to 200 passengers under existing rules. Airbus has sought similar recognition from the FAA to allow higher seating capacities.

When equipped to carry 240 passengers, fuel efficiency per seat is improved by approximately 6%. Combined with new engines and sharklets, Airbus projected a fuel burn reduction exceeding 20%. The modifications add about 100 kg (220 lb) to the aircraft's weight.

The first A321neo ACF was in final assembly in Hamburg in October 2017 and made its first flight on 31 January 2018. The first aircraft with this configuration was delivered to Turkish Airlines in July 2018, and ACF became the standard A321neo layout from 2020.

ACF door-arrangement examples

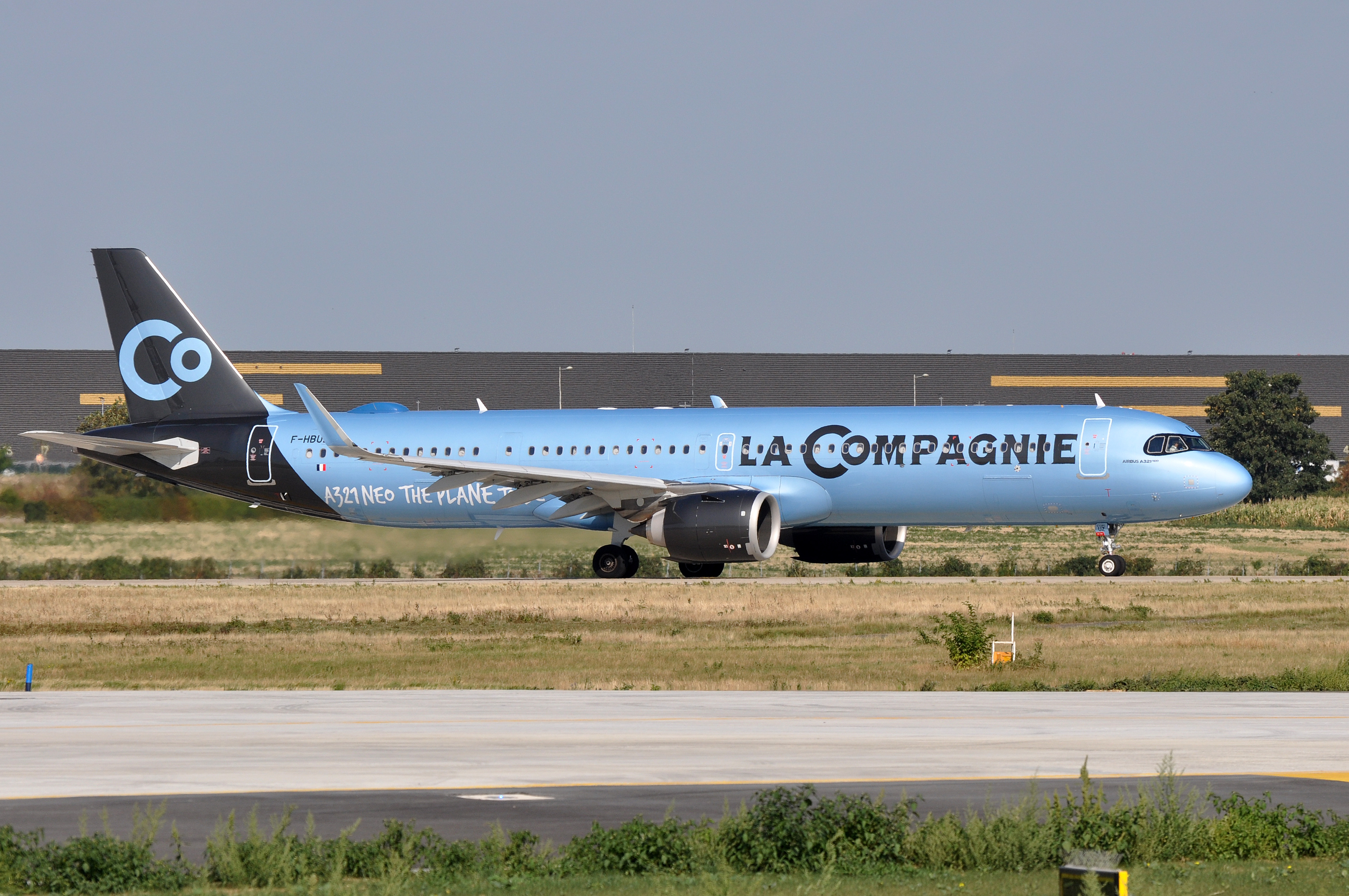
La Compagnie A321neo with one pair of overwing exits plugged and doors L3/R3 plugged (maximum seating: 169)

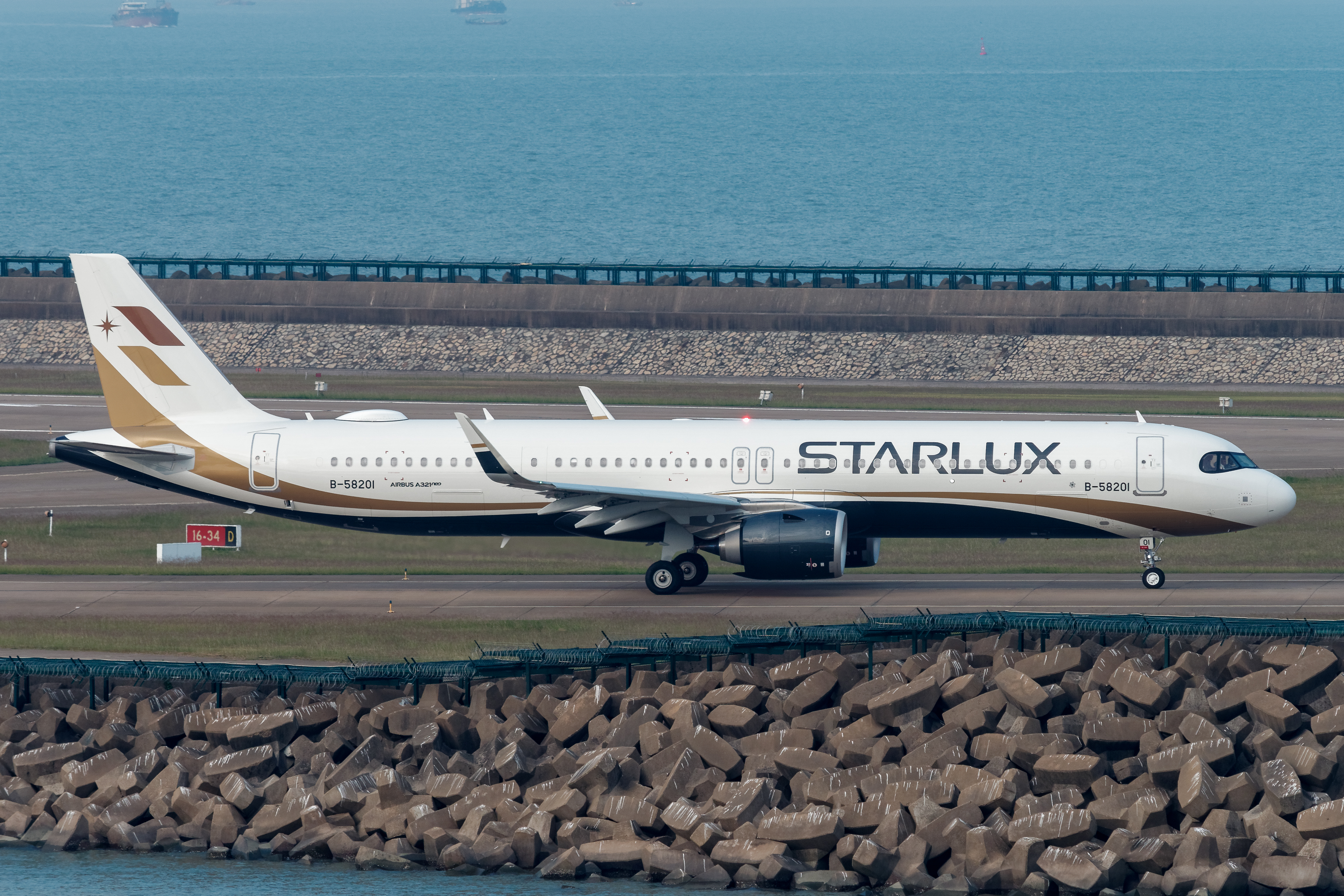
Starlux Airlines A321neo with both pairs of overwing exits activated and doors L3/R3 plugged (maximum seating: 200)

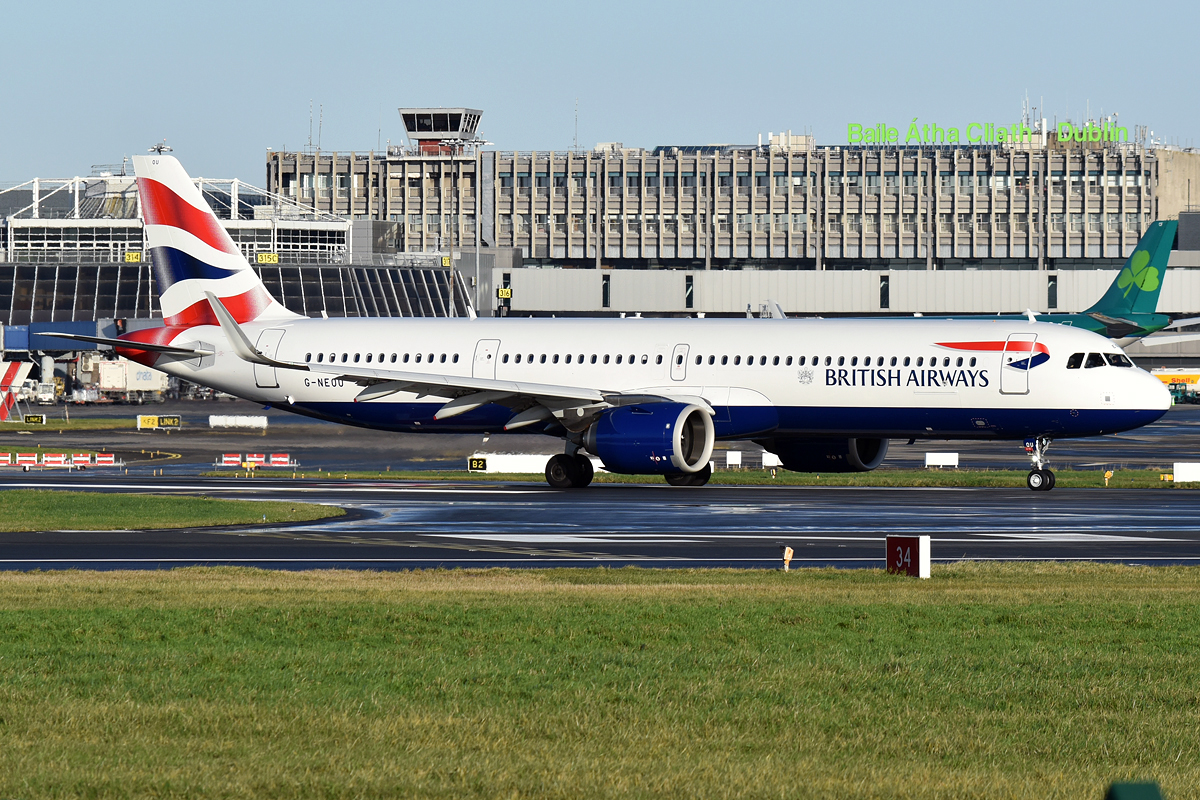
British Airways A321neo with one pair of overwing exits plugged and doors L3/R3 activated (maximum seating: 224)

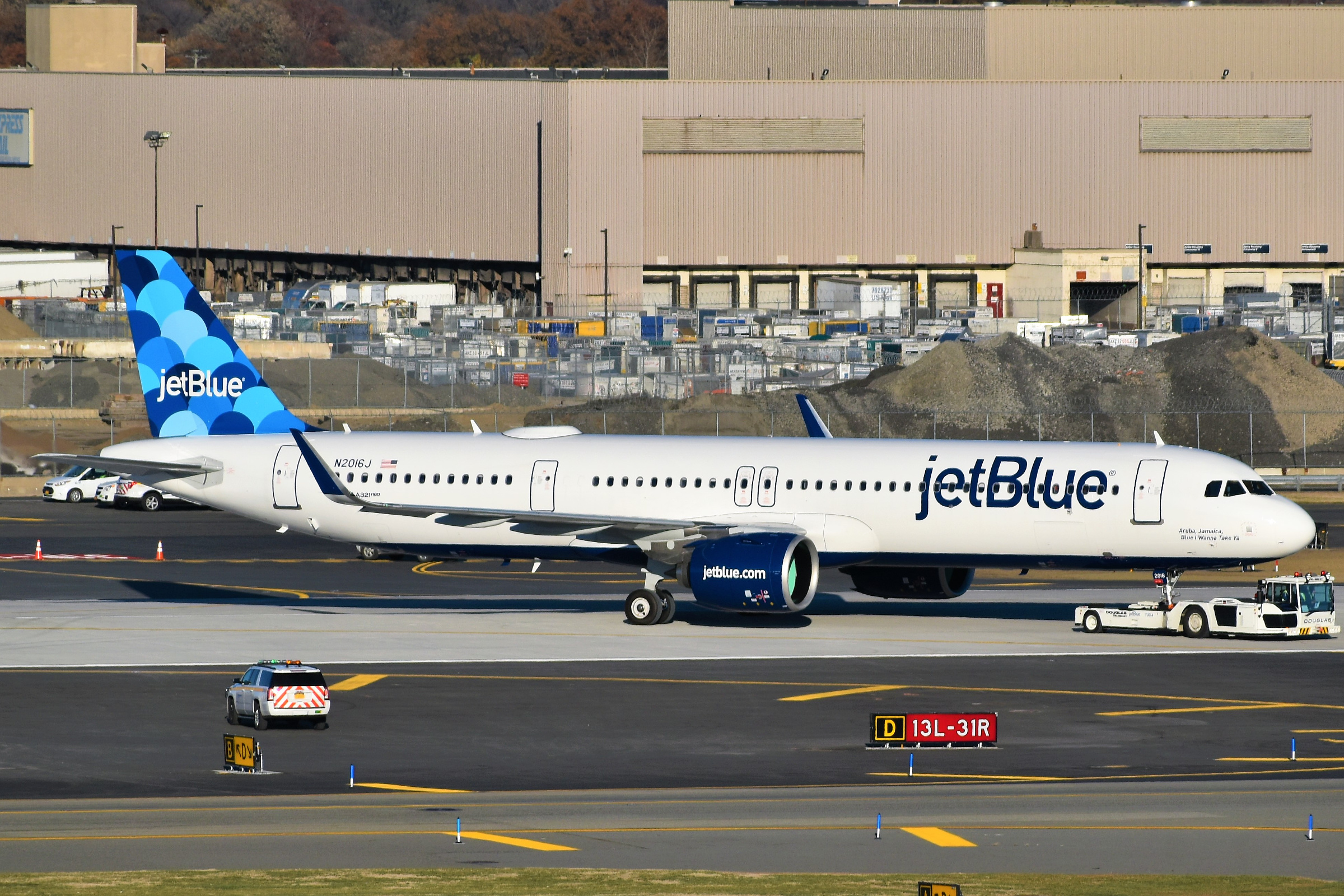
JetBlue A321neo with both pairs of overwing exits activated and doors L3/R3 activated (FAA limit: 200; maximum seating: 244)

== Variants ==
The A321neo is available in multiple variants differentiated by fuel capacity. The A321neo can be configured with up to three optional auxiliary centre tanks (ACTs), including one in the forward cargo hold and up to two in the aft cargo hold, occupying space otherwise available for cargo. Aircraft equipped with three ACTs are designated A321LR (Long Range). (Note: Details listed on Airbus A320 Family Facts and Figures June 2026 page 4)

The A321XLR includes a rear centre tank (RCT) as standard and can be fitted with an additional ACT in the forward cargo hold, also reducing available cargo space. (Note: Details listed on Airbus A320 Family Facts and Figures June 2026 page 3)

A321neo family variants
Marketing name	Cabin	Tank config.		Fuel capacity	Cargo
Marketing name	Cabin	Front	Aft	Fuel capacity	Cargo
A321neo	STD	—N/a	—N/a	18,440 kg (40,650 lb)	10 × LD3‑45
A321neo	STD	—N/a	1 × ACT	20,890 kg (46,050 lb)	9 × LD3‑45
A321neo	STD	—N/a	2 × ACT	23,340 kg (51,460 lb)	8 × LD3‑45
A321neo ACF/LR	ACF	—N/a	—N/a	18,510 kg (40,810 lb)	10 × LD3‑45
A321neo ACF/LR	ACF	—N/a	1 × ACT	20,960 kg (46,210 lb)	8 × LD3‑45
A321neo ACF/LR	ACF	—N/a	2 × ACT	23,410 kg (51,610 lb)	7 × LD3‑45
A321LR	ACF	1 × ACT	2 × ACT	25,860 kg (57,010 lb)	6 × LD3‑45
A321XLR	ACF	—N/a	1 × RCT	28,753 kg (63,390 lb)	8 × LD3‑45
A321XLR	ACF	1 × ACT	1 × RCT	31,202 kg (68,789 lb)	6 × LD3‑45

=== A321neo ===
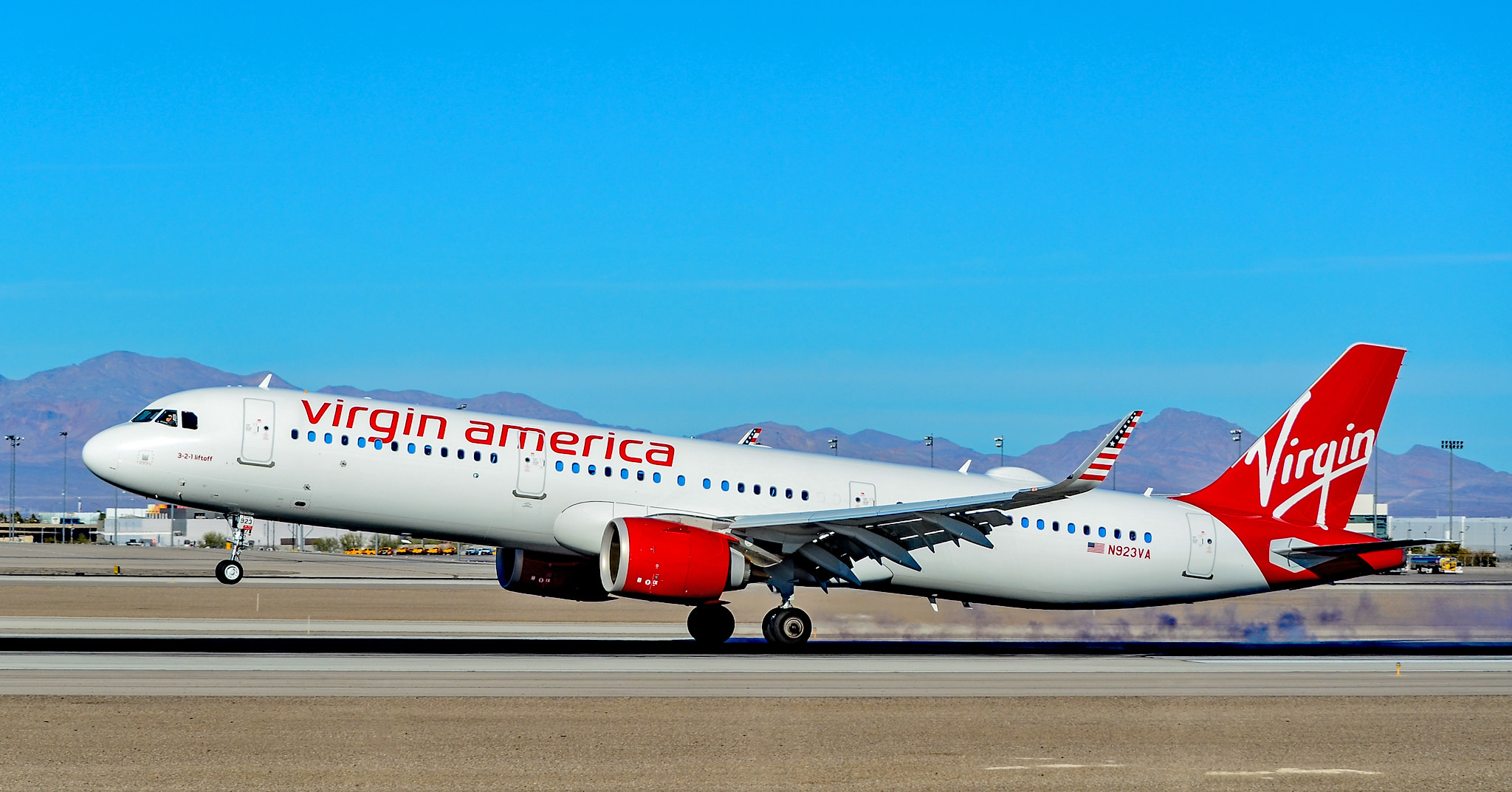
Virgin America received the first A321neo and put it into service in May 2017.

The base A321neo has the same length as the original A321ceo but includes structural strengthening in the landing gear and wing, increased wing loading and other minor modifications in order to increase Maximum Takeoff Weight (MTOW). Its first customer was ILFC.

The Airbus A321neo prototype, D-AVXB, first flew on 9 February 2016. It suffered a tailstrike three days later and was flown to Toulouse for repairs, delaying the certification programme for several weeks.

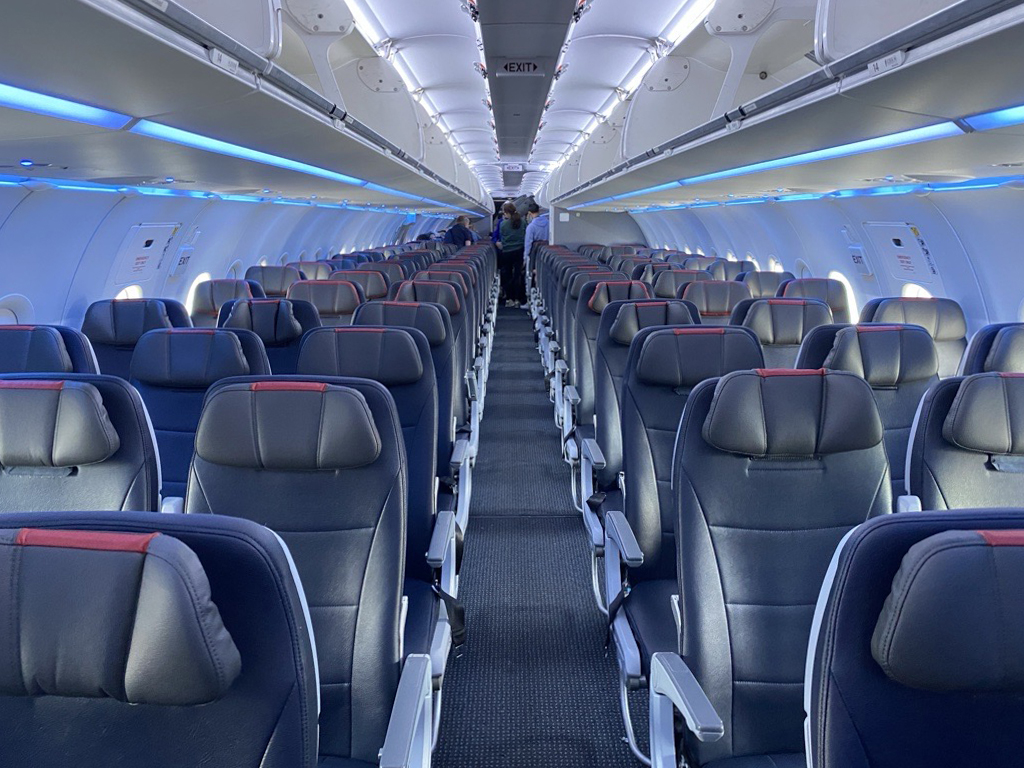
Economy class cabin on an American Airlines Airbus A321neo featuring full-LED ambient lighting

The A321neo received its type certification with Pratt & Whitney engines on 15 December 2016, and simultaneous EASA and FAA certification for the CFM LEAP-powered variant on 1 March 2017. The first A321neo, leased by GECAS, was delivered in Hamburg to Virgin America, configured with 184 seats and LEAP engines, and entered service in May 2017.

The neo empty weight is 1.8 t (4,000 lb) greater than the ceo, due to its new engines and associated airframe modifications: engine pylons, wing structure and bleed and oil systems were adapted. At the same maximum weight, it reaches FL310 30 nmi (35 mi; 56 km) and 4 minutes earlier than the ceo.

At FL330 (10,000 m or 33,000 ft), ISA −2 °C (28 °F) and 67 t (148,000 lb), it burns 2,200 kilograms per hour (4,850 lb/h) at Mach 0.76 (819 km/h; 509 mph; 442 kn) long-range cruise or 2,440 kg/h (5,400 lb/h) at Mach 0.80 (862 km/h; 536 mph; 465 kn) high-speed cruise. To offer similar takeoff performance, pitch response to stick input is a rate-command to hit the 3° per second rotation rate to capture the right pitch attitude and there is an "electronic tail bumper" preventing a tailstrike if the stick is less than three-quarters of the way aft; additional thrust, slower rotation and lift-off speeds require more rudder authority and its maximum deflection went from 25° to 30°.

By January 2018, the A321neo had received 1,920 orders, exceeding orders for the A321ceo. By this time, the A321neo accounted for 32% of all A320neo family orders, whereas the original A321 represented just 22% of A320ceo family orders. By July 2022, the A321neo represented over 53% of all A320neo family orders.

In 2018, the A321neo list price was US$129.5 million.

=== A321LR ===
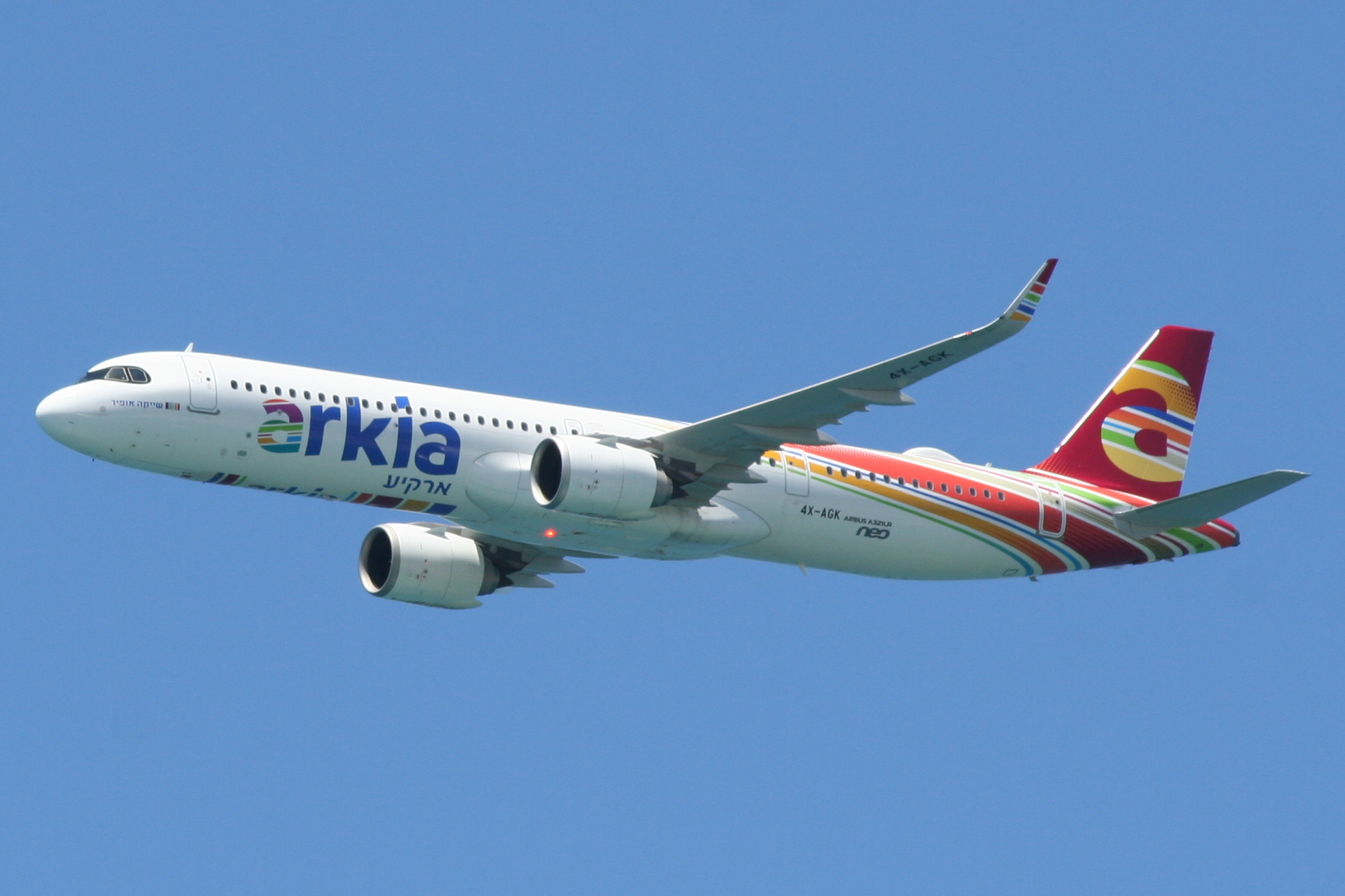
The A321LR was introduced by Arkia on 13 November 2018.

In October 2014, Airbus started marketing a 164-seat, 97 t (214,000 lb) MTOW variant with up to three optional removable auxiliary fuel tanks (ACT) called the A321neoLR (Long Range) with 100 nmi (190 km; 120 mi) more operational range than a Boeing 757-200 configured with 169 seats, 27% lower trip costs and 24% lower per seat costs; it was scheduled for introduction in the second half of 2018, two years after the A321neo.

Airbus launched the A321LR on 13 January 2015 with Air Lease Corporation as the launch customer, hoping to sell 1,000 examples of the variant. The initial layout of 164 seats (20 in business, 30 in premium economy and 114 in economy) was replaced by a two-class 206-seat configuration (16 in business and 190 in economy). Range is 4,000 nmi (7,400 km; 4,600 mi), 500 nmi (930 km; 580 mi) greater than the regular 93.5t MTOW A321neo, making it the first version of the A320 family to have true transatlantic capability, thus replacing the Boeing 757 in the middle of the market. The A321LR has the Cabin Flex layout and was to be first delivered in Q4 2018.

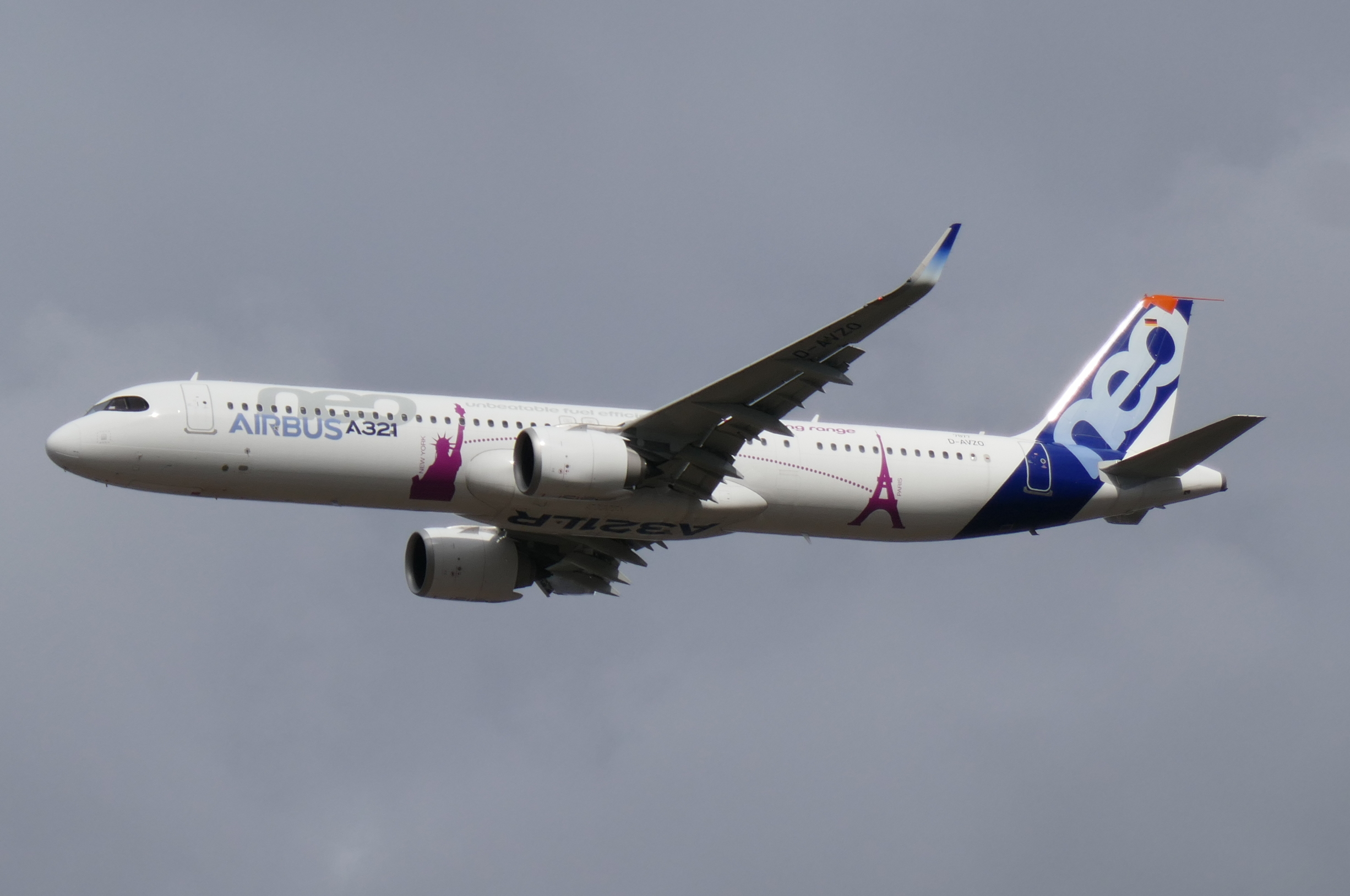
The A321LR prototype.

Certification was aimed for the second quarter of 2018, with a programme including tests with one, two, three, or no additional centre tanks and a transatlantic flight on 13 February. Test flights included a LEAP-powered, long range 4,100 nmi (7,600 km; 4,700 mi) flight by great circle distance, flown in near 11 hours and the equivalent of 162 passengers over 4,700 nmi (8,700 km; 5,400 mi) including headwinds, with 5 crew and 11 technicians. Airbus announced its joint FAA/EASA certification on 2 October 2018, including ETOPS up to 180 minutes, allowing any transatlantic route.

As original launch operator Primera Air ceased operations, the first was delivered to Israeli carrier Arkia in November 2018, while 120 orders have been secured from about 12 operators: Norwegian, TAP Air Portugal, Air Transat, Aer Lingus, Air Astana, Air Arabia and Azores Airlines will receive theirs from 2019, and Jetstar and Peach in 2020.

On 13 November 2018, Arkia received the first A321LR, featuring 220 seats in a single-class and to be deployed to London, Paris, Barcelona for up to 5-hour sectors, or to Zanzibar and the Seychelles, saying it is the first narrow-body more efficient than the 757-300 it operates.

In April 2019, JetBlue announced its intention to use the A321LR on routes to London from Boston and New York-JFK; the airline has converted 13 of its orders for the A321neo to the A321LR to serve these routes. The airline started its service from JFK to London Heathrow on 11 August 2021, and to Gatwick on 29 September.

On 13 April 2019, the UAE branch of Air Arabia received its first of the six A321LRs (WV072) with 97 t (214,000 lb) MTOW, these aircraft are expected to be used on long-haul routes departing from Sharjah to Nairobi, Bangkok, Phuket, Milan Bergamo and Kuala Lumpur, the longest being SHJ-KUL with over 7 hours of air time when returning to the UAE.

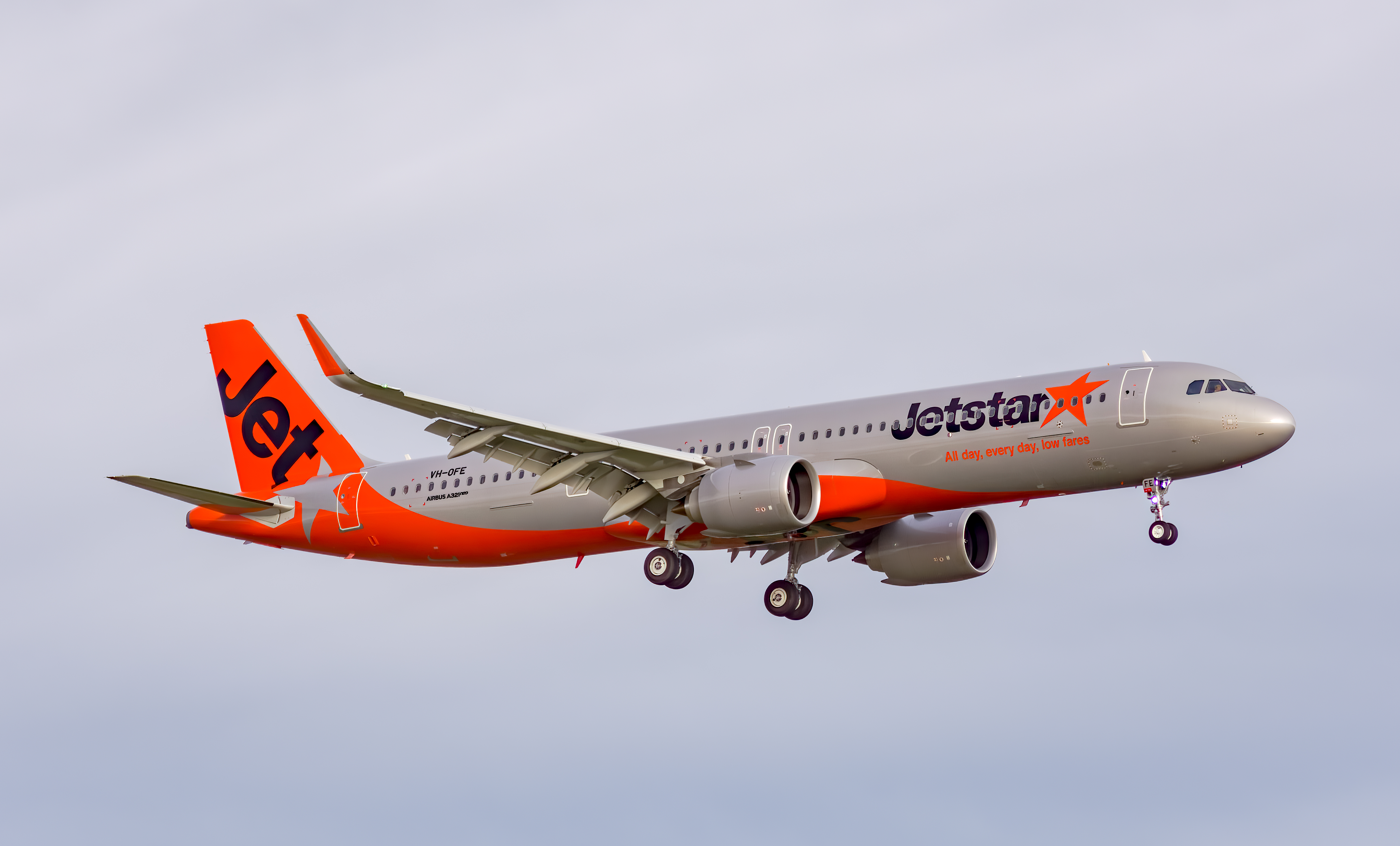
VH-OFE, first A321LR of Jetstar Airways

On 24 July 2022, Jetstar Airways received its first A321LR, the aircraft is fitted with one Auxiliary Fuel Tank (ACT).

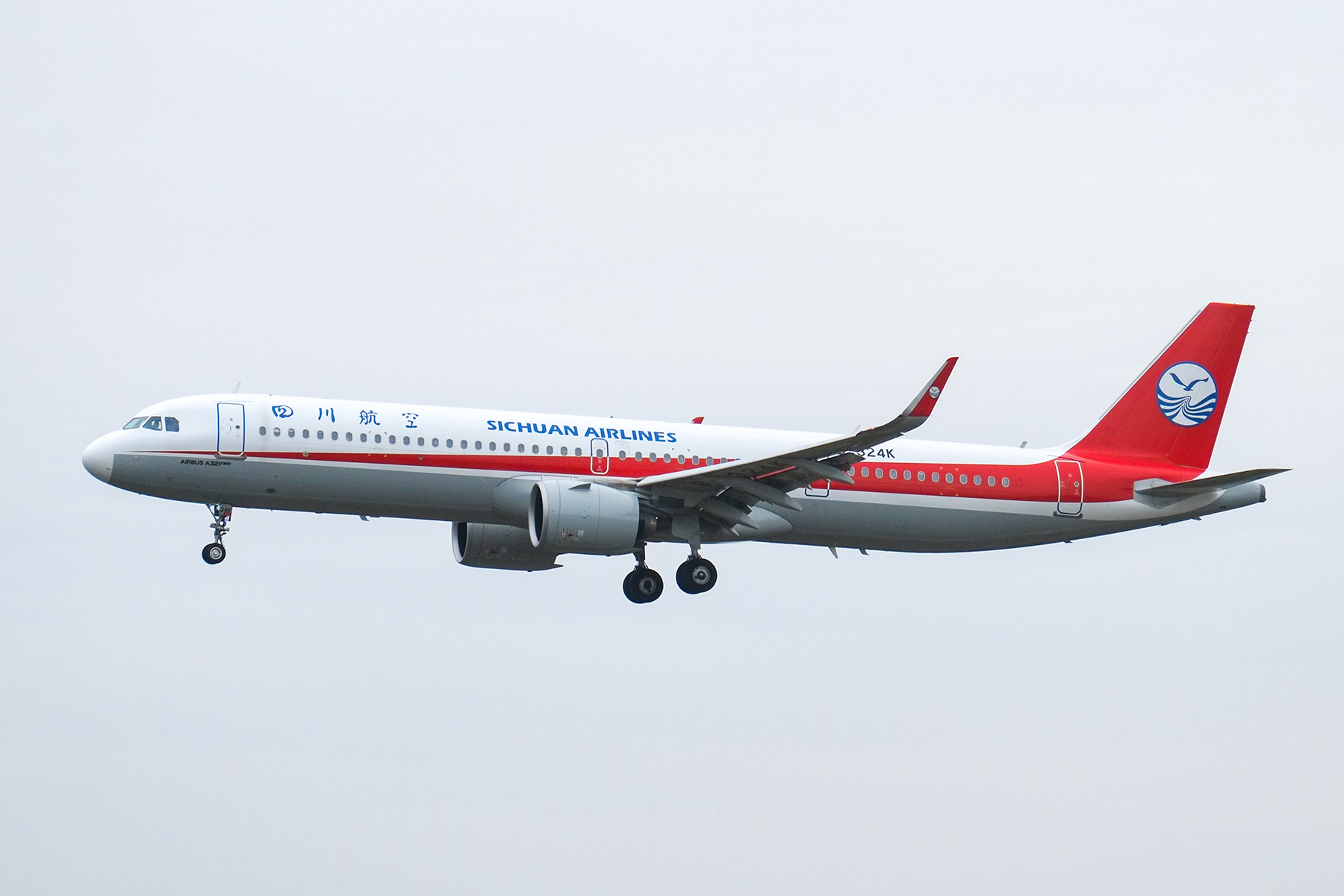
B-324K, China’s first A321LR

On 24 October 2022, Sichuan Airlines received its first A321LR, a total of six have been ordered, they are mainly designated to operate the nonstop Chengdu Tianfu — Malé and Chengdu Tianfu — Tokyo Narita route, which can take over 6 hours on some segments during the winter season, it is the first Chinese airline to receive this type.

On 24 July 2025, Etihad Airways received its first of the 30 ordered A321LR, the aircraft is fitted with 2 Auxiliary Fuel Tanks (ACT).

=== A321XLR ===
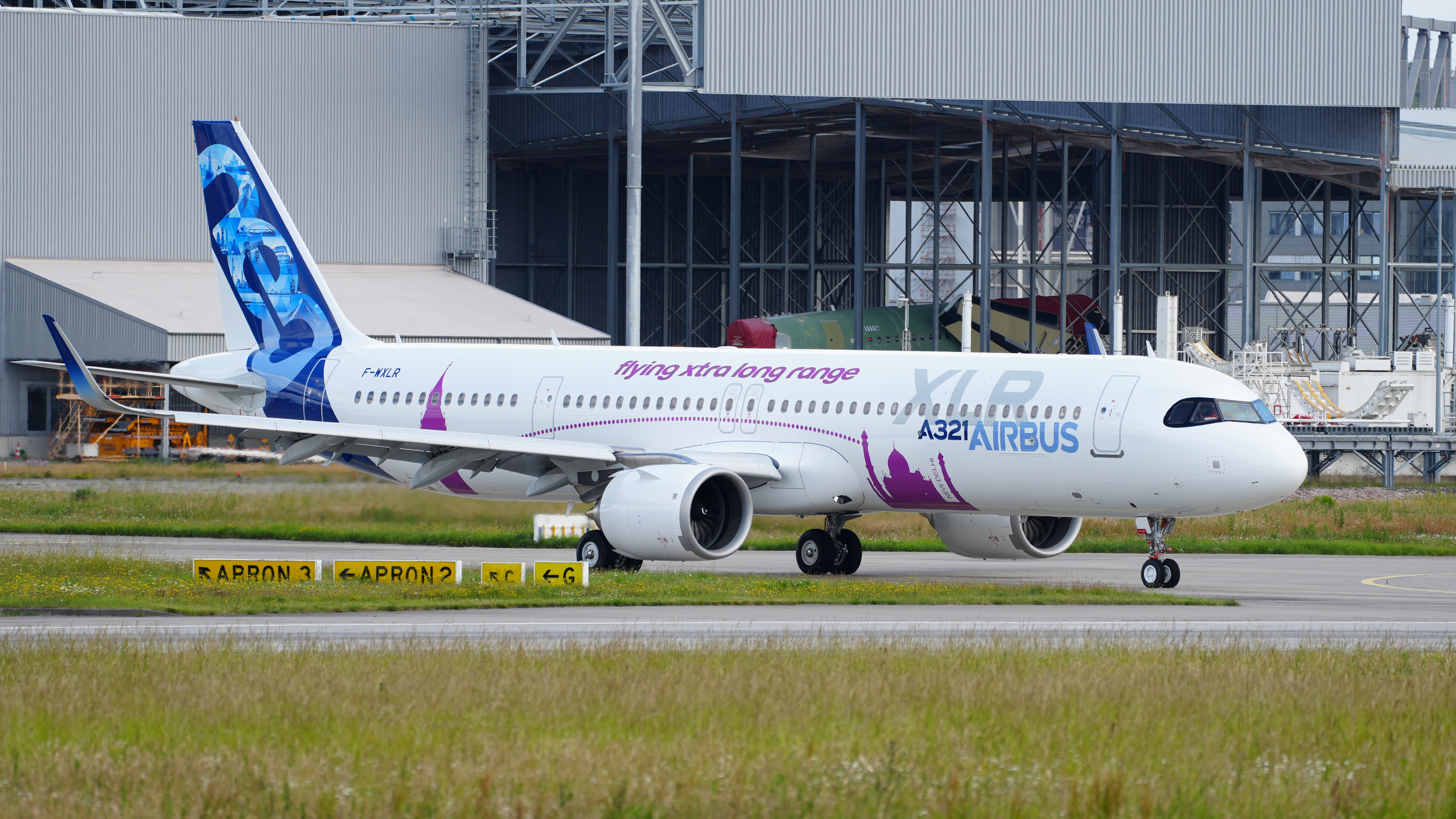
An A321XLR prototype taxiing at Airbus Hamburg-Finkenwerder, 2022

In January 2018, Airbus stated that it was studying an A321LR variant with a further increased MTOW, requiring strengthened landing gear. With a lower-density cabin, it was expected to fly almost 5,000 nmi (9,300 km; 5,800 mi) The proposed A321XLR (Xtra Long Range) with a range extended to 4,500 nmi (8,300 km; 5,200 mi) was to be launched in 2019 to enter service in 2021 or 2022. Integrated in the fuselage to save weight, the centre fuel tank was to be enlarged. As of July 2018, about 200–300 nmi (370–560 km; 230–350 mi) of the targeted range increase had already been secured; additional work was needed to achieve the remaining 200 nmi (370 km; 230 mi).

In October 2018, the A321XLR was proposed to Air Transat and AerCap: Air Transat could reach Southern European destinations such as Split, Croatia from Montreal and Toronto. In November, Airbus indicated that, compared to the A321LR, the A321XLR would have an increase to 100 t (220,000 lb) in MTOW and an increase of 700 nmi (1,300 km; 810 mi) in range, with the same wing and engines, increased fuel capacity and strengthened landing gear. In January 2019, Air Canada expressed interest in using narrow-body aircraft for transatlantic routes and said it was considering options including the A321XLR and the Boeing 737 MAX.

==== Potential stretch ====
In 2018, analysts reported that competing with the Boeing NMA concept airliner could require stretching the A321neo by one or two rows: its take-off weight could be increased to 100 t (220,000 lb) by tweaking its wing and strengthening its landing gear, requiring more engine thrust; or it could receive a lighter and larger new wing, more costly to develop but with the same thrust. A stretch would probably involve fore and aft plugs to keep its centre of gravity, but tailstrike clearance could constrain field speed and performance, while further cabin crew would be needed over 250 seats. The NMA project has been suspended since 2022, leaving no forthcoming competitor for the potential stretch variant of the A321neo.

==== Commercial launch ====
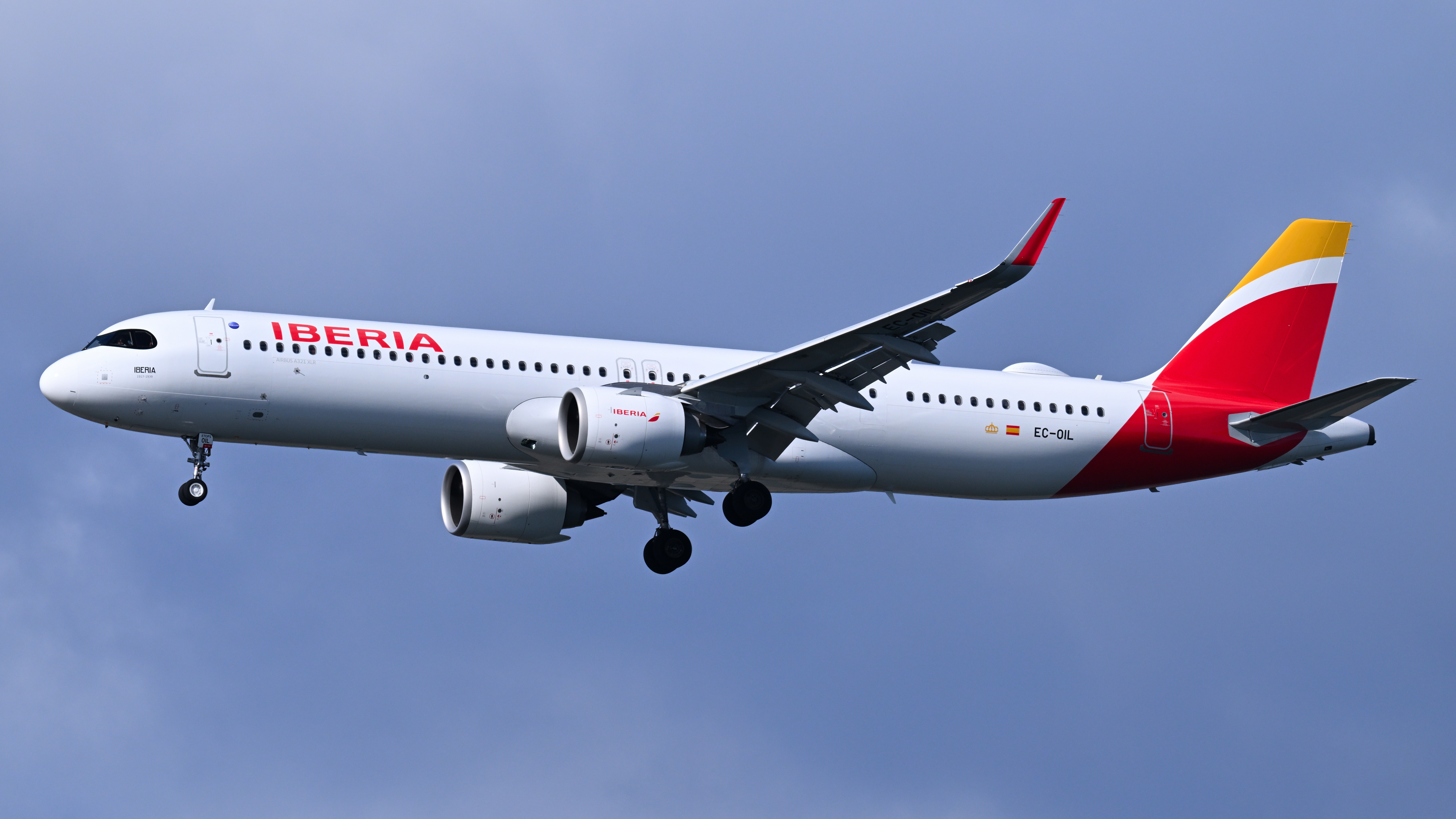
Iberia was the launch customer of the A321XLR.

The A321XLR was officially launched at the Paris Air Show on 17 June 2019, with deliveries at that time expected from 2023. Its design offers 4,700 nmi (8,700 km; 5,400 mi) of range and features a new permanent rear centre tank (RCT) for more fuel, strengthened landing gear for a 101 t (223,000 lb) MTOW, and an optimised wing trailing-edge flap to preserve take-off performance. The RCT will hold 12,900 L (3,400 US gal) of fuel, the equivalent of four 3,121 L (824 US gal) current Additional Centre Tanks (ACTs), yet has a weight equivalent to a single ACT and takes up the cargo hold space of two; a forward ACT can also be fitted if necessary. As the sharklets lowered take-off and landing speeds, the switch from a double-slotted to single-slotted inboard flap will reduce complexity, weight and drag. The FMS can set intermediate flap positions. The revised design could be applied to other A321neo variants.

Orders from several lessors and airlines were announced at the show, starting with Middle East Airlines, which ordered four A321XLRs, making it the launch airline customer. Air Lease Corporation ordered 27 A321XLRs alongside 23 other A321neos and 50 A220-300s. IAG quoted a $142 million list price as it committed to 28 aircraft, including 8 for Iberia, 6 for Aer Lingus, plus 14 options. Qantas Group placed an order for 48 XLRs, to be operated on routes between Australia and Asia, and is also set to be one of the launch customers. American Airlines converted 30 A321neo orders to XLRs and ordered an additional 20 XLRs. Indigo Partners also placed an order for 50 XLRs for its airline divisions and Frontier Airlines ordered 18, bringing the total number of commitments announced at the show to 243.

Some are cautious about the potential market: Lufthansa sees the variant as a "niche aircraft" less comfortable than widebodies, and a large lessor is hesitant as it expects a 400–500 aircraft market. Airbus argues that the minimal changes mean it can be used as a regular A321neo and ALC forecast potential for 50 operators in the next five years. The market could prefer shorter turnaround times to more range.

On 29 October 2019, IndiGo placed a firm order for 300 A320neo family aircraft, including 69 A321XLR. On 3 December 2019, United Airlines announced an order to purchase 50 new Airbus A321XLR aircraft, with deliveries beginning in 2024, to replace their Boeing 757–200 fleet. Valued at $7.1 billion before discounts ($142M each), United plans to use these aircraft for additional destinations in Europe from its East Coast hubs in Washington, DC and Newark. In April 2020, 450 orders for the XLR had been received from 24 customers. In March 2023, 465 orders for the A321XLR were received. In July 2023, Icelandair ordered 13 XLR.

Iberia announced on 19 May 2024 that the company will be "the first airline in the world to add the new Airbus A321XLR to its fleet".

In July 2024, the Airbus A321XLR powered by CFMI LEAP engines received EASA certification and conducted a demonstration flight at the Farnborough Airshow. The Pratt & Whitney PW1100G-powered variant subsequently received type certification from both the FAA and EASA in February 2025.

From September 2025, Qantas has been flying the A321XLR mainly on domestic routes between Sydney, Melbourne, Brisbane and Perth. They have also released plans to fly the newest international-upgraded A321XLRs, which feature seatback screens and wider legroom, on international routes such as Brisbane to Manila.

==== Manufacturing ====
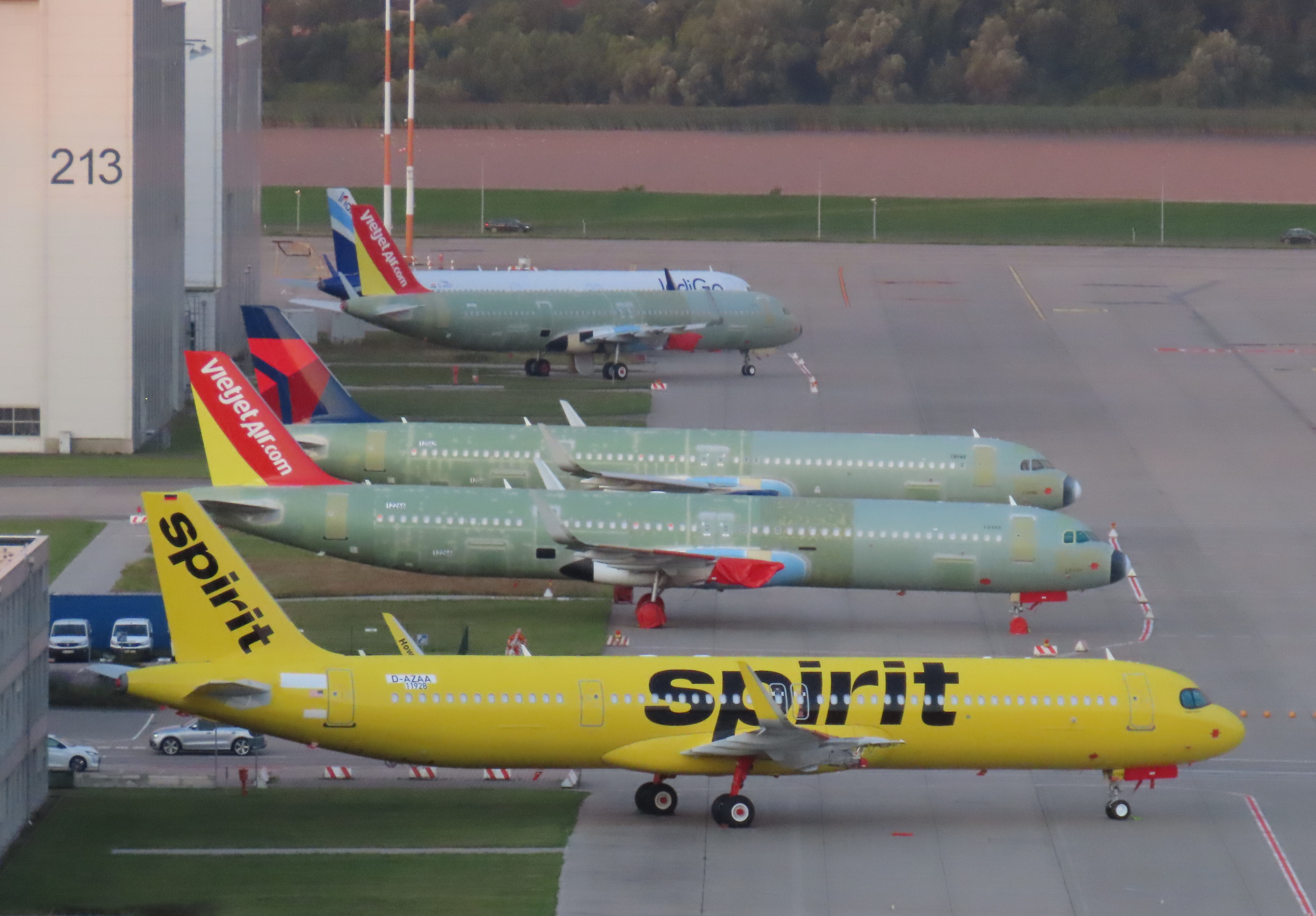
Airbus A321neos awaiting completion at the Hamburg Finkenwerder final assembly line.

The XLR needs 10–15% more work than an ACF, itself requiring 30% more work than a standard A321neo. Engines used for now generate 150 kN (33,000 lb) of thrust and could be sufficient, and no more than the 160 kN (35,000 lb) already certified are needed for the XLR. The XLR is a low-risk, high-commonality variant but more substantial upgrades could include a composite wing or a stretch.

By April 2020, Airbus had cut the first metal for the centre wingbox, while Safran had begun undercarriage forging production. Premium Aerotec will manufacture the specific aft centre fuel tank primary structure, Spirit AeroSystems will build the inboard single-slotted flap, FACC AG will produce a modified belly fairing, while Collins Aerospace and Parker Aerospace are developing the fuel systems. By August 2020, Premium Aerotec had started producing the rear centre tank for the first A321XLR in Augsburg, to be transferred to Airbus's Hamburg plant in early 2021.

By April 2021, a standard A321LR fuselage section had been withdrawn from the Hamburg production line for use as a "pre-industrial system accelerator" to test the integration of XLR-specific systems; at Saint-Nazaire, a nose section was serving as an integration test bed for a new instrument panel assembly, before being used to analyse structural reinforcements needed for the XLR. The fuselage sections, wings, landing gear and tailplanes of the first test aircraft were delivered to the Hamburg Final Assembly Line in November, and its structure was completed by early December, among three planned development aircraft, and before entry into service in 2023.

The first A321XLR prototype was rolled out in May 2022, equipped with CFM LEAP engines. The first flight took place on 15 June 2022 from Hamburg. However, entry into service was pushed back to 2024 from the initial 2023 date to address fuel tank issues raised by regulators. A revised design with special conditions was approved by the United States Federal Aviation Administration in December 2022.

==== Entry into service ====
The A321XLR received its type certificate from EASA on 19 July 2024 and from the FAA on 2 October 2024. The first A321XLR was delivered to Iberia on 30 October 2024 and conducted its first revenue flight on 6 November 2024. The first long-haul flight with passengers was on 14 November 2024, from Madrid to Boston.

=== A321MPA ===
The A321MPA (Maritime Patrol Aircraft) is a military maritime patrol and anti-submarine warfare derivative under development, based on the long-range A321XLR platform. First introduced as a concept at the Euronaval exhibition in November 2024, the variant was chosen by the French Ministry of Armed Forces over a competing Dassault proposal based on the Falcon 10X business jet. In February 2025, the French Defence Procurement Agency (DGA) awarded a 24-month definition and risk-reduction contract to Airbus Defence and Space as the prime contractor, alongside Thales Group, to mature the platform ahead of a full development and production contract expected at the end of 2026.

The aircraft is scheduled to enter service with the French Navy between 2030 and 2040, replacing its aging Bréguet 1150 Atlantic II fleet. Airbus also intends to market the platform internationally to compete with the Boeing P-8 Poseidon, drawing significant export interest following its presentation at the Singapore Airshow in February 2026.

Billed as a "flying frigate," the A321MPA leverages the expanded volume and payload capacity of the A321XLR airframe. Key modifications include observation windows beneath the cockpit and a dedicated internal weapons bay housed in an underfloor ventral gondola behind the wing to minimize aerodynamic drag. This bay allows for the internal carriage of anti-submarine torpedoes and future anti-ship and cruise missiles (FMAN/FMC). The mission architecture relies heavily on a Thales-developed electronics suite, incorporating a next-generation active electronically scanned array (AESA) search radar, acoustic processing systems for active and passive sonobuoys, electronic support measures (ESM), and a tail-mounted magnetic anomaly detector (MAD).

== Operators ==
There are 1,752 A321neo aircraft in service with 88 operators as of June 2025. The five largest operators are Wizz Air (156), IndiGo (143), American Airlines (84), China Southern Airlines (84), and Delta Air Lines (89).

	2011	2012	2013	2014	2015	2016	2017	2018	2019	2020	2021	2022	2023	2024	2025	A321neo
Orders	119	81	341	183	346	287	532	360	965	208	616	530	1562	658	235	7,064
Deliveries	–	–	–	–	–	–	20	102	168	178	199	264	317	361	143	1,752

== Specifications ==
Variant	A321neo	A321LR	A321XLR
Cockpit crew	Two		
2-class seats	206 (16J @ 91 cm (36 in) + 190Y @ 76 cm (30 in))		
1-class max.	244 @ 71 cm (28 in)		
Cargo capacity	51.70 m^{3} (1,826 cu ft) / 10 × LD3‑45 (Note: With no additional fuel tanks)		
Length	44.51 m (146 ft)		
Wingspan	35.80 m (117 ft 5 in) (Note: with sharklets)		
Wing	122.4 m^{2} (1,318 ft^{2}) area, 25° sweep		
Height	11.76 m (38.6 ft)		
Fuselage	3.95 m × 4.14 m (13.0 ft × 13.6 ft) width × height, 3.70 m (12.1 ft) wide cabin		
Max. takeoff weight	93.5 t (206,100 lb)	97 t (213,800 lb)	97 t (213,800 lb) (Note: Without optional ACT); 101 t (222,700 lb) (Note: With or without optional forward ACT)
Max. payload	25 t (55,100 lb)	23.5 t (51,800 lb)	23.5 t (51,800 lb); 23 t (50,700 lb) (Note: With optional forward ACT)
Operating empty weight	50.1 t (110,500 lb)		
Fuel capacity	23,490 L (6,210 US gal)	32,943 L (8,703 US gal) (Note: A321LR with 3 Additional Centre Tanks)	36,628 L (9,676 US gal); 39,748 L (10,500 US gal)
Engines (×2)	CFM LEAP-1A, 200 cm (78 in) fan Pratt & Whitney PW1100G-JM, 210 cm (81 in) fan		
Max. thrust (×2)	143.05–147.28 kN (32,160–33,110 lb)		
Speed	Cruise: Mach 0.78 (450 kn; 833 km/h; 518 mph); Max.: Mach 0.82 (473 kn; 876 km/h; 544 mph)		
Ceiling	39,100–39,800 ft (11,900–12,100 m)		
Typical range	3,500 nmi (6,480 km; 4,030 mi)	4,000 nmi (7,410 km; 4,600 mi) (Note: with 206 passengers)	4,700 nmi (8,700 km; 5,410 mi)

=== Engines ===
Suffix "N" (e.g., A321-271N) denotes A321 airframes with the standard (STD) cabin door layout. "NX" (e.g., A321-272NX) denotes airframes built with the Cabin Flex (ACF) configuration, including all A321LR aircraft. "NY" (e.g., A321-271NY) denotes A321XLR models. No separate suffix exists for A321LR aircraft, which are included within the "NX" (ACF) designation.

Within the model number, the digit "5" (e.g., A321-251N) denotes aircraft powered by CFM International LEAP-1A engines, while "7" (e.g., A321-271N) denotes Pratt & Whitney PW1100G engines. The final digit indicates thrust rating: "1" (e.g., A321-251NX) denotes the baseline (standard-thrust) configuration; "2" (e.g., A321-252NX) denotes a derated configuration, in which the engines operate at reduced thrust; and "3" (e.g., A321-253NX) denotes an uprated configuration, in which the engines operate at higher thrust than the baseline.

Aircraft model	Certification date	Engines	Take-Off Thrust	Max. Continuous
A321-271N	15 December 2016	PW PW1133G-JM	147.28 kN (33,110 lb_{f})	145.81 kN (32,780 lb_{f})
A321-251N	1 March 2017	CFM LEAP-1A32	143.05 kN (32,160 lb_{f})	140.96 kN (31,690 lb_{f})
A321-253N	3 March 2017	CFM LEAP-1A33	143.05 kN (32,160 lb_{f})	140.96 kN (31,690 lb_{f})
A321-272N	23 May 2017	PW PW1130G-JM	147.28 kN (33,110 lb_{f})	145.81 kN (32,780 lb_{f})
A321-252N	18 December 2017	CFM LEAP-1A30	143.05 kN (32,160 lb_{f})	140.96 kN (31,690 lb_{f})
A321-251NX	22 March 2018	CFM LEAP-1A32	143.05 kN (32,160 lb_{f})	140.96 kN (31,690 lb_{f})
A321-252NX	22 March 2018	CFM LEAP-1A30	143.05 kN (32,160 lb_{f})	140.96 kN (31,690 lb_{f})
A321-253NX	22 March 2018	CFM LEAP-1A33	143.05 kN (32,160 lb_{f})	140.96 kN (31,690 lb_{f})
A321-271NX	22 March 2018	PW PW1133G-JM	147.28 kN (33,110 lb_{f})	145.81 kN (32,780 lb_{f})
A321-272NX	22 March 2018	PW PW1130G-JM	147.28 kN (33,110 lb_{f})	145.81 kN (32,780 lb_{f})
A321-253NY	18 July 2024	CFM LEAP-1A33X	143.05 kN (32,160 lb_{f})	110.54 kN (24,850 lb_{f})
A321-271NY	7 February 2025	PW PW1133GR-JM	147.28 kN (33,110 lb_{f})	103.42 kN (23,250 lb_{f})

== See also ==
Related development

- Airbus A320neo family

Aircraft of comparable role, configuration, and era

- Boeing 737 MAX 10
- Tupolev Tu-204
- Yakovlev MC-21

Related lists

- List of Airbus A320 operators
- List of jet airliners
