= Milestone Aviation Group =

Aircraft leasing company

Milestone Aviation Group (GECAS)
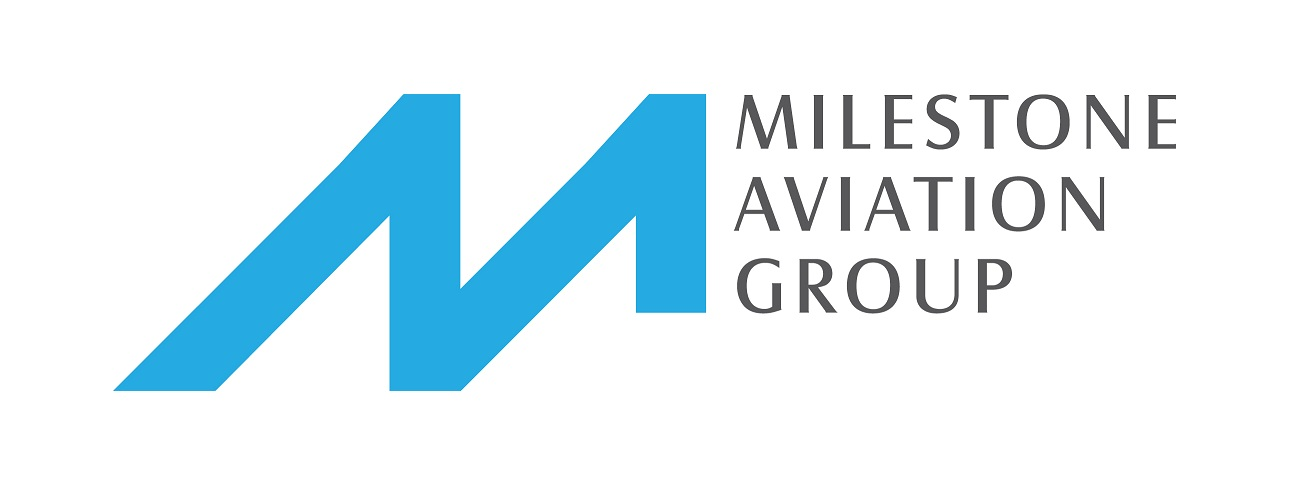
- Industry: Aviation
- Founded: June 2010; 16 years ago
- Founder: Richard Santulli; William Kelly; Daniel Rosenthal; Matthew Harris; Robert Dranitzke; John Burns
- Headquarters: Dublin, Ireland
- Key people: Pat Sheedy, CEO
- Services: Aircraft leasing
- Number of employees: 44
- Parent: AerCap
- Website: milestoneaviation.com

Milestone Aviation Group, a subsidiary of AerCap, is an aircraft leasing company focused on helicopters. As of December 31, 2021, it owned 355 helicopters, which are leased to companies including CHC Helicopter, Bristow Helicopters, Saudi Aramco, and Babcock International.

The company has international offices in Dublin and Dubai.

== History ==
Milestone Aviation Group was founded in August 2010 by Richard Santulli, who was responsible for the growth of NetJets into a multinational corporation, with a $500 million investment from two private equity companies: Jordan Co. and Nautic Partners LLC.

In August 2012, the company placed one of the largest-ever helicopter orders: 22 aircraft for $682 million, primarily to serve the petroleum industry.

In June 2015, the company was acquired by GE Capital Aviation Services for $1.775 billion plus the assumption or payoff of Milestone’s existing debt.

In November 2021, GE Capital Aviation Services was acquired by AerCap.
