= Guinness Peat Aviation =

Defunct Irish aircraft lessor

- Type: Public
- Industry: Aircraft leases
- Founded: 1975
- Founder: Tony Ryan
- Defunct: November 1998
- Successor: AerFi Group plc
- Headquarters: Shannon, County Clare, IE

Guinness Peat Aviation (GPA) was an aircraft leasing company set up in 1975 by Aer Lingus, the Guinness Peat Group (a London-based financial services company) and Tony Ryan, then an Aer Lingus executive.

== History ==
GPA was based in Shannon, Ireland. During the 1980s it became the world's largest commercial aircraft lessor and expanded its shareholding to include Air Canada, General Electric, Short Term Credit Bank of Japan and companies in the Mitsubishi group. GPA also had financing joint ventures with key aircraft manufactures, including Airbus, Fokker and McDonnell Douglas. At its peak, the company was valued at $4 billion. Net income reached $265 million in the year to 31 March 1992.

Former Taoiseach Garret FitzGerald, former British chancellor of the exchequer Nigel Lawson, Peter Sutherland and the former chairman of ICI, Sir John Harvey-Jones, were among GPA's non-executive directors. Lawson joined the board of GPA in February 1990 but he also became chairman of GPA Financial, a subsidiary company.

In 1990, GPA placed a $20 billion order for new aircraft, at the time 10 per cent of the world's aircraft production. It was then making an annual profit of $280 million.

A new company, GPA Helicopters Ltd., was set up in June 1990 as a joint venture with CHC Helicopter to acquire, own and lease helicopters worldwide.

=== Downfall ===
The decision to float the company on the stock market in 1992, during an aviation industry downturn following the 1991 Gulf War, proved disastrous, as international financial institutions refused to buy shares. Unable to raise the capital it needed to continue its ambitious operations, the company plunged into crisis, with some $10 billion in debts.

The company's downfall was later chronicled by Christopher Brown, a GPA Senior Vice-President, in his 2009 book Crash Landing.

=== Restructuring ===
In a subsequent restructuring completed in November 1993, GPA avoided default on its debts by selling some of its aircraft to GE Capital Aviation Services (GECAS), a subsidiary of General Electric, which also took over the operational management of GPA's fleet and most of GPA's technical and marketing staff. GE Capital also acquired an option to purchase 90% of GPA's ordinary shares at a low price. GPA used the cash from this transaction to repay all its unsecured debt. Chairman and chief executive Tony Ryan transferred to GECAS. He was replaced by Patrick Blaney as chief executive and by Dennis Stevenson (later Lord Stevenson of Coddenham) as chairman.

GPA continued to own a substantial fleet and in March 1996 sold 229 aircraft for $4 B in what was at the time the second largest securitisation transaction ever. GPA used the cash from this sale to repay all of its secured debt and the company returned to profit in the year to 31 March 1996 with net income of $65 M. However, the servicer of the securitisation was GECAS, meaning that those 229 aircraft were now marketed by GECAS in terms of leasing and re-leasing, effectively joining the GECAS fleet for many purposes, further confirming the rise of GECAS at the expense of GPA.

GPA further consolidated its position in the years to 31 March 1997, 1998 and 1999, reporting net income of $108 million, $64 million and $47 million. In November 1998, Texas Pacific Group acquired 62% of the company's shares and GE Capital's 1993 option was replaced by one to acquire an interest of 23%. As part of this transaction, the name of the company was changed to AerFi Group plc.

In December 1999, AerFi acquired Indigo Aviation, a Swedish aircraft lessor, and by 31 March 2000 was managing a fleet of 104 aircraft and reporting a profit of $68 million.

In November 2000, AerFi was acquired by debis AirFinance, an affiliate of DaimlerChrysler AG, for $750 million. AerFi's fleet and staff were then merged into those of debis AirFinance.

In March 2005, debis AirFinance was acquired by Cerberus Capital and subsequently renamed AerCap.

== Legacy ==
Many of the directors and staff of GPA subsequently went on to found or work for other aircraft lessors, such as GECAS (now merged into AerCap), Genesis Lease, CIT, AerCap (a successor to Guinness Peat and previously debisAirFinance), ILFC (now merged into AerCap), Pembroke Capital, International Aircraft Management Group (subsequently RBS Aviation Capital and later SMBC Aviation Capital), Babcock & Brown (now Fly Leasing) and Aircastle. The availability of this cadre of highly trained specialists in Ireland is one of the principal reasons (along with a favourable corporate tax environment associated with the International Financial Services Centre (IFSC) in Dublin) why the country has become one of the worldwide centres of the commercial aircraft financing and leasing industry, with over 40 companies, most located in the IFSC. GPA's founder, Tony Ryan, set up his own airline, Ryanair, that was Europe's biggest in 2014, carrying over 83.8 million passengers annually.

== Sponsorship ==
During the Ethiopian famine, GPA sponsored two airlifts of emergency supplies in October and November 1984. GPA supported the renovation of the Bolton Library in Cashel, County Tipperary. A number of other, mainly artistic endeavours benefited from sponsorship by GPA that included the following: In 1988 the first GPA Dublin International Piano Competition took place and was won by French pianist Philippe Cassard. In 1984 Robert Armstrong won the Guinness Peat Aviation Awards for Emerging Artists and in 1986 Eithne Jordan won during the show held in Dublin. One of the exhibitors was Vincent Killowry and in 1987 GPA bought most of the works at his first one-man show in Limerick. In 1989 John Banville received the Guinness Peat Aviation Book Award for his novel The Book of Evidence, also shortlisted for the Booker Prize for Fiction. Also in 1989 the Foynes Flying boat Museum at its inception, was sponsored as the GPA Foynes Flying Boat Museum.

A statue of Daedalus, sculpted by John Behan, was presented to the people of Ennis to mark the town's 750th anniversary in 1990.

== Sources ==
=== Bibliography ===
- Bailey, John; Learmount, David (3 September 1988). "The West Coast lessors: Anyone seeking evidence of the changes which increased competition has brought to the ways airlines assess and satisfy their fleet requirements should study the spectacular growth of the International Lease Finance Corporation (ILFC) and the GPA Group". Flight International. Vol. 134, no. 4129. Beverly Hills, California, USA; Shannon, Ireland. pp. 95–98. ISSN 0015-3710.
- Hopkins, Harry (14 June 1986). "Aircraft asset management—a growth industry: As aircraft become more expensive, and the demands for flexibility become more acute, specialist leasing and management companies such as Guinness Peat are coming to prominence". Flight International. Vol. 129, no. 4015. pp. 38–41. ISSN 0015-3710. OCLC 13798403.
