= GE Capital Aviation Services =

Aviation financing and leasing company

GECAS
- Formerly: GE Capital Aviation Services
- Industry: Aviation finance and lease
- Fate: Acquired by AerCap in November 2021
- Successor: AerCap
- Headquarters: Shannon, County Clare & Norwalk, Connecticut, United States
- Number of locations: 23 offices (2019)
- Number of employees: 575 (2018)
- Parent: GE Capital
- Website: www.gecas.aero

GECAS (GE Capital Aviation Services) was an Irish–American commercial aviation financing and leasing company. AerCap acquired the company from GE Capital on November 1, 2021.

GECAS was the largest commercial airline leasing/financing company in the world by number of aircraft. The company offered many aviation finance services, including aircraft leasing, aircraft lending, engine leasing, asset management, and aircraft consulting. In terms of aircraft leasing, GECAS purchased aircraft from manufacturers such as Airbus and Boeing, and then leased them to airlines, typically for about eight years, and usually on dry lease contracts. GECAS also offered purchase leasebacks. The company had two global headquarters in Shannon, Ireland, and Norwalk, Connecticut. The company had over 575 employees and 26 offices throughout the world.

GECAS had a fleet of over 1,970 aircraft, operated by 270 clients in over 75 countries. GECAS' primary competitor was AerCap, with other competitors including Air Lease Corporation, Aviation Capital Group, BBAM and SMBC Aviation Capital.

GE Aviation, another GE subsidiary, was part of the CFM International joint venture with Safran. Previously, GECAS had a policy of exclusively selecting GE engines for 99% of its airliners, and had only eight Boeing 757s with Pratt & Whitney or Rolls-Royce turbofans. As the Airbus A350 XWB did not select GE engines, GECAS would not order it without airline placement. However, the company finally leased the first A350 operated by Qatar Airways to diversify assets and reduce risk. GECAS also leases the Pratt & Whitney-powered Bombardier Q400 and ATR 72. GE/CFM supports Pratt & Whitney, Rolls-Royce and IAE engines.

== History ==
Former logo of GE Capital Aviation Services

In 1967, GE Credit Corporation (GECC), now GE Capital, signed its first aviation lease with Allegheny Airlines. The deal leased three McDonnell Douglas DC-9s to the Pittsburgh-based operator. In 1981, GECC's Transportation & Industrial platform began to co-invest with UK lenders on aircraft leases. Two years later, GECC completed its first non-US lease to Swissair. GECC purchased the California-based Polaris Aircraft Leasing Corporation in 1986. With the purchase of Chemical Bank in 1989, GECC would begin to crucially expand its global presence.

GECAS was officially formed in 1993 to manage the assets bought from the Irish-based Guinness Peat Aviation, GECC Transportation & Industrial's Aviation Group, and Polaris Aircraft Leasing. By 1996, the company owned the world's largest leased fleet, and place its first speculative OEM order. In 1999, GECAS added engine leasing to its service offerings.

In 2000, GECAS acquired PK AirFinance to offer aircraft lending. The same year, the company also moved into the regional jet and widebody space with its first order for Boeing 777s. In 2002, the company began freighter conversions to further maximize the life of its narrowbody assets.

The acquisition of The Memphis Group in 2006 added airframe parts to GECAS'service portfolio. GECAS also owns a minority stake in Oxford Aviation Academy retained when it sold 80% (before dilution) of GECAT to Star Capital Partners in 2007.

In 2010, GECAS acquired AviaSolutions, offering aviation consulting as part of the company's services. In 2015, GECAS took over the Irish-based Milestone Aviation Group to add helicopters and rotary aircraft to its leasing portfolio.

In 2016, GECAS was ranked as "World's Top Lessor" by AirFinance Journal and Airline Economics magazines.

In September 2018, GE hired Goldman Sachs to review GECAS' strategy as its portfolio value declined since 2012 from $34.1 to $23.6 billion, evaluating a full sale or a company break-up like Guinness Peat Aviation from which it emerged in 1993.

== Services ==
GECAS' successor "AerCap" maintains a portfolio of narrowbody and widebody passenger aircraft, cargo aircraft, regional jets, and turboprop aircraft from manufacturers such as Airbus, Boeing, Embraer, Bombardier and ATR. Through its Milestone Aviation Group, GECAS also owns and leases AgustaWestland, Sikorsky and Airbus Eurocopter helicopters. Customers finance these aircraft through the following GECAS offerings:

- Operating leases
- Purchase leaseback agreements
- Secured loans
- Aircraft servicing

Additionally, GECAS's successor "AerCap" buys, leases and finances aircraft engines from GE and CFM, as well as from manufacturers Rolls-Royce, Pratt & Whitney, IAE and Engine Alliance. GECAS provides the following for its engine pool:

- Operating leases
- Short-term leases
- Purchase leaseback agreements
- Secured loans
- Engine exchange
- Engine servicing

GECAS distributed re-certified engine and aircraft parts through its Asset Management Services group. The company maintains an inventory of parts from Airbus, Boeing, Douglas and Bombardier aircraft that have been overhauled, repaired or modified, and distributes these parts from warehouses in North America, Europe and Asia.

GECAS previously operated AviaSolutions, which provided aircraft consultancy services to airports, investors and financial institutions, governments and airlines. AviaSolutions advised clients on business development, route development, infrastructure planning, airline management, regulations, and various other projects.

== Merger with AerCap ==
In March 2021, General Electric and AerCap announced an agreement to merge the two lessors.

The transaction simplifies GE and focuses it on its industrial core—Power, Renewable Energy, Aviation, and Healthcare—while significantly reducing GE Capital assets and generating proceeds to further de-risk and de-lever. For the first quarter of 2021, in connection with signing the transaction agreement, GE will record an approximate $3 billion non-cash charge and report GECAS as a discontinued operation. At closing, the remainder of GE Capital, including Energy Financial Services (EFS) and the company’s run-off insurance operations, will transition to GE Corporate. This means GE will report industrial-only financials and move from three-column to simpler one-column financial statement reporting.

After the deal closes, GE intends to use the transaction proceeds and its existing cash sources to reduce debt by approximately $30 billion, for an expected total reduction of more than $70 billion since the end of 2018. GE also expects to continue to execute significant additional debt reduction and increase earnings to reach its Industrial leverage target of less than 2.5x net debt to EBITDA over the next few years.

In November 2021, AerCap announced the completion of a merger with GECAS.
