= Genesis Lease =

- Type: Subsidiary of General Electric
- Traded as: NYSE: GLS
- Industry: Aircraft leasing
- Defunct: March 25, 2010
- Fate: Merged with AerCap
- Headquarters: Shannon, County Clare, Ireland

Genesis Lease Limited (NYSE: GLS) was a global aircraft leasing company incorporated in Bermuda in July 2006 and had a successful IPO and New York Stock Exchange listing in December 2006. It was headquartered in Shannon, County Clare, Ireland. It acquired its initial portfolio of leased aircraft from GE Capital Aviation Services (GECAS), who continued to service the portfolio (collecting rentals, monitoring maintenance condition, etc.). On 25 March 2010 Genesis Lease Limited merged with AerCap Holdings N.V. (NYSE: AER) in an all share-for-share merger.

Genesis stock was traded on the New York Stock Exchange as an American depositary receipt stock under the ticker GLS.
