= FLY Leasing =

Aircraft leasing company

FLY Leasing Limited
- Company type: Public
- Traded as: NYSE: FLY
- Industry: Aircraft Leasing
- Headquarters: Dublin, Ireland
- Key people: Joseph M. Donovan (Chairman); Colm Barrington (CEO)
- Revenue: ▲$418.3 million (2018)
- Total assets: ▲$4.2 billion (2018)
- Total equity: ▲$702.1 million (2018)
- Website: www.flyleasing.com

FLY Leasing (FLY) is an aircraft leasing investment company.

Its fleet comprises 110 aircraft, mostly Airbus A320 and Boeing 737 aircraft. FLY does not manage its own fleet, instead leases are managed and executed by BBAM, a leasing management firm. FLY strictly focuses on the investment and return of the aircraft instead of carrying out day-to-day operations. As a result, FLY has few employees. Onex, in December 2012, acquired 50% of FLY's portfolio manager BBAM and invested $75 million into FLY. In August 2021, Carlyle Aviation Partners announced the completion of the acquisition of FLY.
