= Richard Santulli =

American businessman (born 1944)

- Born: August 14, 1944 (age 82)
- Occupation: Chairman of Milestone Aviation Group

Richard T. Santulli (born August 14, 1944) is an American businessman. He is the founder and chairman of Milestone Aviation Group, a helicopter and business jet leasing company.

He is best known for pioneering the concept of fractional jet ownership with NetJets, a company he developed in 1986. Santulli was once considered a possible successor to Warren Buffett at Berkshire Hathaway.

== Early life and education ==
Richard T. Santulli was born in Brooklyn, New York on August 14, 1944. Santulli studied at the New York University Tandon School of Engineering, earning B.S. and M.S. degrees in mathematics, as well as a master's degree in industrial engineering.

== Career ==
Santulli's first job after graduating was with Shell Oil Company.

In 1984, Santulli purchased Executive Jet, a charter service company, as a wholly owned subsidiary of RTS Capital Services. The company launched NetJets, a program that introduced a 'time-share' concept of fractional ownership (as previously seen in resort properties) to business jets, and then purchased eight Cessna Citation IIs.

In July 1998, Warren Buffett's Berkshire Hathaway Inc. announced that it was buying NetJets for $725 million in stock and cash. Buffett had been a NetJets customer since 1995. Santulli and his older brother, Vincent, who joined Executive Jet in 1996 after starting and taking public Porta Systems Corp, an electronics company, agreed to continue to run the business. Santulli stayed on as chairman and CEO until his resignation in August, 2009. He remained a consultant for the company through August, 2010.

In December 2009, Santulli joined Loan Value Group as chairman of the board.

In August 2010, Santulli launched Milestone Aviation Group, a helicopter and business jet leasing company where he currently serves as chairman. Santulli secured an initial $500 Million from U.S. private-equity firm Jordan Co., in conjunction with Nautic Partners to launch the business.

Santulli is currently the owner and managing general partner alongside George Prussin of Jayeff B Stables. Santulli is also a trustee of the New York Racing Association, a steward of The Jockey Club and a member of the Breeders' Cup's board of directors.

== Philanthropic involvement ==
Santulli serves as co-chairman of The Intrepid Sea-Air-Space Museum board of directors and chairman of the board for The Intrepid Fallen Heroes Fund. He is director of Mercy Home for Children, a non-profit organization that provides residential, supportive and respite programs for individuals with developmental disabilities. In 1989, the Richard T. Santulli Residence was established in Brooklyn, New York, to provide a residence with full-time care and support services to 15 people with disabilities.

Mr. Santulli serves as a Director of the Andre Agassi Foundation for Education, an organization dedicated to transforming U.S. public education for underserved youth.

== Award and honors ==
- 2016 : Honorary degree of Ohio State University (D. Bus. Administration)
