= AerCap =

Irish aircraft leasing company

AerCap Holdings N.V.
- Type: Public
- Traded as: NYSE: AER
- Industry: Aircraft leasing
- Founded: 2006; 20 years ago
- Headquarters: Registered office: Amsterdam, Netherlands; Corporate headquarters: Dublin, Ireland
- Key people: Paul Dacier (chairman); Aengus Kelly (CEO); Peter Anderson (CCO); Pete Juhas (CFO)
- Revenue: ▲US$7.996 billion (2024)
- Net income: ▼US$2.099 billion (2024)
- Total assets: ▲US$71.44 billion (2024)
- Total equity: ▲US$17.18 billion (2024)
- Number of employees: 699 (2024)
- Website: www.aercap.com

AerCap Holdings N.V. is an Irish aviation leasing company based in Dublin, Ireland, with its registered office based in Amsterdam, Netherlands. AerCap is listed on the NYSE with the ticker 'AER'. It became the largest aviation leasing company in the world following the acquisition of ILFC in 2014, and GECAS from GE in 2021, for over $30 billion.

Its assets include 1,486 owned narrow-body aircraft and wide-body aircraft as of the end of Q3 2023, as well as cargo aircraft, aircraft engines, regional jets, and helicopters. Following the closing of the GECAS transaction General Electric owned 45.4% of the company, but, after a series of secondary market sales in March and September 2023, sold its final stake in November 2023. The company is now fully owned by public shareholders, the largest of which was Wellington with 21 million shares at the end of September 2023.

== Business ==
=== Portfolio ===
As of 31 December 2022, it had 3,532 aircraft, engines and helicopters owned, on order or managed, including 1,572 owned aircraft, 187 managed aircraft, 435 new aircraft on order, with a weighted average age of 7.2 years, and over 900 owned and managed aircraft engines, primarily manufactured by General Electric and CFM International. Through Milestone Aviation Group, its subsidiary, it owns 325 helicopters.

The company is one of the largest purchasers of aircraft from Boeing, Airbus, and Embraer and one of the largest purchasers of aircraft engines from CFM International, GE Aviation, International Aero Engines, Pratt & Whitney, and Rolls-Royce.

=== Customers ===
In 2022, its largest customers based on percentage of revenue were American Airlines (6.3% of 2022 revenues), China Southern Airlines (4.7% of 2022 revenues), Azul Brazilian Airlines (4.2% of 2022 revenues), Air France (3.0% of 2022 revenues), and Ethiopian Airlines (2.4% of 2022 revenues).

The company leases aircraft primarily via operating leases under which the lessee is responsible for the maintenance and servicing of the equipment during the lease term and the company receives the residual value of the equipment at the end of the lease. The company serves over 300 customers in 80 countries.

Its helicopters are leased to companies including CHC Helicopter, Bristow Helicopters, Saudi Aramco, and Babcock International. The company's cargo division serves customers including Amazon, Maersk, and ASL Airlines Ireland.

=== Locations ===
It has its headquarters in Dublin, and offices in Shannon, London, Dubai, Miami, Singapore, Amsterdam and Shanghai. It also has representative offices near the operational headquarters of the world's two largest aircraft manufacturers, namely Boeing in Seattle and Airbus in Toulouse.

== History ==
Aercap traces its history to one of the first aircraft leasing companies, Guinness Peat Aviation, founded in 1975 by Tony Ryan. In 1998, it became AERFI after a bailout from Texas Pacific Group. In 2000, it was acquired by Debis AirFinance, owned by Daimler Chrysler, for $750 million.

In 2005, Debis AirFinance was acquired by affiliates of Cerberus Capital Management, and renamed AerCap. In 2006, the company set up AerVenture, a 50/50 joint venture with LoadAir/Al Fawares. In 2009, after its partners refused to fund a capital contribution, Waha Capital acquired a 50% stake and became partners with AerCap.

In November 2006, the company became a public company via an initial public offering. In March 2010, the company acquired Genesis Lease at a discount to book value as a result of the financial crisis, following this transaction Paul Dacier and Michael Gradon joined the AerCap board. By 2013, the affiliates of Cerberus sold substantially all of their shares in the company.

=== 2014 ILFC acquisition ===
In May 2014, the company acquired International Lease Finance Corporation from American International Group (AIG) for $3.0 billion of cash and $4.6 billion in stock. The deal gave AerCap $43 billion in total assets and a fleet of over 1,300 aircraft, making it the largest in the world by fleet value, and second to competitor GE Capital Aviation Services by fleet count.

In January 2015, the company moved its assets and headquarters to Ireland. In June 2015, AerCap signed an agreement with Boeing for an order of 100 Boeing 737 MAX 8 aircraft with deliveries starting in 2019. In June 2015, AIG sold about 71.2 million shares in a public offering and AerCap purchased an additional 15.7 million of its shares from AIG. In August 2015, AIG completed its departure from the airplane-leasing business with the sale of the additional 10.7 million shares.

By the end of 2015, AerCap's portfolio consisted of 1,697 aircraft that were owned, on order, under contract or managed (including aircraft owned by AerDragon, a non-consolidated joint venture). The average age of the owned fleet as of 31 December 2015 was 7.7 years and the average remaining contracted lease term was 5.9 years. In 2015, AerCap leased, purchased and sold 405 aircraft. The company signed lease agreements for 276 aircraft and purchased 46 new aircraft. AerCap executed sale and part-out transactions for 83 aircraft and signed financing transactions for US$7.3 billion.

In February 2016, AerCap reported record 2015 financial results and authorized a share repurchase program of $400 million. In 2016, AerCap signed lease agreements for 279 aircraft, purchased 38 and sold 141 aircraft, and signed financing transactions for $4.6 billion; as of 31 December 2016, it has 1,566 owned, managed or on order aircraft in its portfolio.

In June 2017, Aercap placed an order for 30 Boeing 787-9s, valued at $8.1 billion at list prices at the Paris Air Show. AerCap announced on 28 December that it exercised options to purchase 50 A320neo Family aircraft to be delivered from 2022, bringing its A320neo Family portfolio to 270 owned and on order. In March 2021, AerCap signed a deal with start-up long-haul, low-cost airline Norse Atlantic Airways, for the lease of six used Boeing 787-9s and three used Boeing 787-8 aircraft.

=== 2021 GECAS acquisition ===
In March 2021, Aercap announced they had reached a deal to acquire GE Capital Aviation Services (GECAS) from General Electric for US$24 billion in cash, US$1 billion of AerCap notes and approximately 46% of the combined business in shares. The acquisition was approved by AerCap shareholders in May 2021. In November, the company completed the acquisition for 111.5 million AerCap shares, approximately $23 billion of cash and $1 billion of AerCap notes. In 2022, the company moved its U.S. headquarters from Los Angeles to Miami.

=== 2022 Russian invasion of Ukraine ===
The company was negatively affected by the 2022 Russian invasion of Ukraine and the international sanctions that followed. At the beginning of the invasion, it had 152 aircraft valued at $2.5 billion in Russia and Ukraine, which foreign companies were unable to recover or service. In May 2022, the company reported a net loss of $2 billion due to the seizure of its planes and engines by the Russian authorities. 113 of its planes were seized in response to sanctions triggered by the war in Ukraine.

AerCap had initially written off or impaired $3.16 billion of assets in relation to the Russian situation although some recoveries were made leaving an overall net charge of $2.66 billion.

In September 2023 an agreement was reached with Aeroflot regarding a compensation package for 17 aircraft stranded in Russia with the payment of a $645 million being made for the settlement, resulting in the aircraft now being owned by Aeroflot.

Further cash settlements were received in December 2023 relating to aircraft formerly leased to S7 and Ural Airlines for approximately $572 million in respect of 18 aircraft and one spare engine and (ii) 29 aircraft and four spare engines.

In June 2025, London's High Court ruled that AerCap can recover more than $1 billion from their insurers in relation to the almost 150 jets stuck in Russia since the invasion of Ukraine.
