= BBAM =

Aircraft lease company

BBAM LLC is an aircraft lease company based in San Francisco, United States. BBAM was originally part of the Australian group Babcock & Brown.

In 2017, it had become the seventh largest aircraft leasing company of the world, managing a fleet of 390 aircraft.

== See also ==
- FLY Leasing
