= Aircraft lease =

Lease of aircraft by airlines

Aircraft leases are leases used by airlines and other aircraft operators. Airlines lease aircraft from other airlines or leasing companies for two main reasons: to operate aircraft without the financial burden of buying them, as well as to provide temporary increase in capacity. The industry has two main leasing types: wet-leasing, which is normally used for short-term leasing, and dry-leasing which is more normal for longer-term leases. The industry also uses combinations of wet and dry. For example, when the aircraft is wet-leased to establish new services, then as the airline's flight or cabin crews become trained, they can be switched to a dry lease. In some markets, there may also be hybrid models, such as with crew provided by lessees.

== Market ==
Operating leases of jet airliners accounted for less than 2% of the fleet in 1976, then 15% in the early 1990s, 25% in 2000 and 40% in 2017, with lessors involved in 62% of second-hand mid-life aircraft transactions since 2000: 42% in Europe and 29% in North America. In 2015, over $120 billion worth of commercial aircraft were delivered worldwide and half of the global lessors were based in Ireland.

Having an aggressive growth mandate, more aggressive, smaller entrants have overpaid for many of their assets in the sale and leaseback market and are then undercharged on lease rates in order to win the business, with lower maintenance reserves and return conditions: lease-rate factors have fallen to 0.6% per month (7.2% per year), even reaching 0.55% (6.6% per year).

Despite Air Berlin and Monarch Airlines bankruptcies, their leased aircraft have been rapidly placed at "normal market rates" due to traffic growth as global revenue passenger kilometers are up by 7.7% over one year through September 2017, and Airbus struggles to deliver A320neos due to engine supply delays.

In 2007, Beijing allowed Chinese banks to start leasing units, and nine Chinese lessors were part of the 50 largest in 2017, led by ICBC leasing in the top ten, having the value of their managed fleet grew by 15% since 2016. In a few cases, Chinese lessors forgot they had to get secondary leases and missed the redelivery timing, stranding aircraft for a few months.

Rentals are often anchored to LIBOR rates. A320neo and B737 MAX 8 lease rates are $20-30,000 higher than their predecessors: by 2018, a B737-8 can be leased for slightly more than $385,000 per month and a 12 year term with a good credit can be lower than $370,000 per month for an A320neo (0.74% of its around $49 million capital cost), generating $53 million of revenue and over $8.5 million in an end of lease compensation for maintenance, while still being worth $20 million.

Airlines that cannot afford a good deal on factory direct aircraft, or carriers who prefer to maintain flexibility, can lease their aircraft with an operating lease or a finance lease.

== Lease types ==
=== Wet lease ===
A wet lease is a leasing arrangement whereby one airline (the lessor) provides an aircraft, complete crew, maintenance, and insurance (ACMI) to another airline or other type of business acting as a broker of air travel (the lessee), which pays by hours operated. The lessee provides fuel and covers airport fees, and any other duties taxes, etc. The flight uses the flight number of the lessee. A wet lease generally lasts 1–24 months. A wet lease is typically utilized during peak traffic seasons or annual heavy maintenance checks, or to initiate new routes. A wet-leased aircraft may be used to fly services into countries where the lessee is banned from operating. It can also be used to replace unavailable capacity or to circumvent regulatory or political restrictions.

They can also be considered a form of charter whereby the lessor provides minimum operating services, including ACMI, and the lessee provides the balance of services along with flight numbers. In all other forms of charter, the lessor provides the flight numbers. Variations of a wet lease include a code share arrangement, a block seat agreement, and a capacity purchase agreement.

Wet leases are occasionally used for political reasons. For instance, EgyptAir, an Egyptian government enterprise, for many years was not allowed to fly to Israel under its own name, as a matter of Egyptian government policy. Hence Egyptian civilian flights from Cairo to Tel Aviv, required to exist under the terms of the Egypt–Israel peace treaty of 1979, were operated by Air Sinai, which wet-leased from EgyptAir to circumvent the political issue. In 2021, Egypt changed its policy and EgyptAir started operating flights to Israel under its own banner.

The global wet lease market was projected to grow from US$7.35 billion in 2019 to US$10.9 billion in 2029, a compound annual growth rate (CAGR) of 4.1%.

=== Dry lease ===
A dry lease is a leasing arrangement whereby an aircraft financing entity (lessor), such as AerCap or Air Lease Corporation, provides an aircraft without crew, ground staff, etc. Dry lease is typically used by leasing companies and banks, requiring the lessee to put the aircraft on its own air operator's certificate (AOC) and provide aircraft registration. A typical dry lease lasts upwards of two years and bears certain conditions with respect to depreciation, maintenance, insurances, etc., depending also on the geographical location, political circumstances, etc.

A dry-lease arrangement can also be made between a major airline and a regional airline, in which the major airline provides the aircraft and the regional operator provides flight crews, maintenance and other operational aspects of the aircraft, which then may be operated under the major airline's name or some similar name. A dry lease saves the major airline the expense of training personnel to fly and maintain the aircraft, along with other considerations (such as staggered union contracts, regional airport staffing, etc.).

FedEx Express uses an arrangement of this type for its feeder operations, contracting to companies such as Empire Airlines, Mountain Air Cargo, Swiftair, and others to operate its single- and twin-engined turbo-prop "feeder" aircraft in the US. DHL has a joint venture in the United States with Polar Air Cargo, a subsidiary of Atlas Air, to operate their domestic deliveries.

=== UK usage and damp leases ===
In the United Kingdom, a wet lease refers to an aircraft lease in which the aircraft is operated under the air operator's certificate (AOC) of the lessor. An arrangement where the lessor provides the aircraft, flight crew and maintenance but the lessee provides the cabin crew is sometimes referred to as a "damp lease", a term especially used in the UK; it is also occasionally referred to as a "moist lease". In the UK, a dry lease is when an aircraft is operated under the AOC of the lessee.

== Lessors ==
At the end of July 2015, the top 50 aircraft lessors managed 8,184 aircraft: 511 turboprop regional airliners, 792 regional jets, 5,612 narrowbody and 1,253 widebody airliners. In 2017, the 150 lessors are managing 8,400 aircraft worth $256 billion with 2,321 aircraft on backlog from 28 of them, their penetration having stabilised at 42.6%. Aircraft lessors are often banks, hedge funds or financial institutions.

Aircraft financing is a $140 billion industry, dominated by Ireland due to the rise and collapse in 1992 of pioneer Guinness Peat Aviation (GPA), of which the former executives manage the largest lessors: Aengus Kelly is the CEO of AerCap, the world's largest, Domhnal Slattery heads the third largest, Avolon, and Peter Barrett runs the fourth, SMBC Aviation Capital while the second largest, GECAS, formed from the hulk of GPA.

2017 Top 20 operating lessors by Fleet & Backlog, number of aircraft in 2015
Rank	Operating Lessor	Fleet	Backlog	Value ($mn)	2012 Rank	2015 fleet	Turbo prop	Regional Jet	Narrow body	Wide body
1	AerCap	1,153	339	33,994	9	1,279	-	4	970	305
2	GECAS	931	304	22,358	1	1,608	31	374	1,035	168
3	Air Lease Corporation	271	357	13,120	9	251	18	27	162	44
4	SMBC Aviation Capital (ex RBS)	445	200	13,796	6	393	-	7	378	8
5	BOC Aviation	285	176	12,653	10	256	-	16	204	36
6	Avolon	546	257	19,167	17	166	-	6	140	20
7	BBAM (incl NBB & FLY Leasing)	390		15,284	3	413	-	2	357	54
8	Aviation Capital Group	250	132	5,397	4	273	-	-	264	9
9	ICBC Leasing Co	277	45	12,488	16	173	-	13	131	29
10	AWAS	231	15	5,844	7	295	-	-	242	53
11	Macquarie AirFinance	202	40	4,726	13	176	-	4	160	12
12	CDB Aviation Lease Finance	151	49	5,569	26	120	-	20	68	32
13	Aircastle	192		4,938	14	141	-	5	77	59
14	ALAFCO	60	124	2,750	12	49	-	-	46	3
15	Boeing Capital	174		1,369	11					
16	China Aircraft Leasing	90	138	4,278	63	47	-	-	43	4
17	Orix Aviation	167		3,991	15	148	-	2	132	14
18	Standard Chartered Aviation	120	10	4,077	18					
19	Jackson Square Aviation	117		4,681	25	110	-	-	97	13
20	BoCom Leasing	114		4,328	81	49	-	-	38	11

Lessors have a preference for narrowbodies over widebodies due to more remarketing opportunities and the substantial reconfiguration time and cost a larger aircraft requires. Reconfiguring an Airbus A330-300 can cost $7 million and even more for a Boeing 777-300ER or an Airbus A380: introducing IFE - $1.5 million ($5,000 per seat), replacing business seats - $1.5 million ($30,000 each), replacing economy seats - $1 million ($5,000 each), a new lavatory or galley - $100,000, moving a monument - $35,000, class dividers - $50,000, passenger service units - $9,000 per passenger, sidewall panels - $6,000 each, updating the IFE database - $125,000, repainting the aircraft - $100,000, engineering costs - $100,000.

=== 2026 ===
Aircraft leasing companies continued to expand their portfolios in 2026, with consolidation and demand for new-generation aircraft remaining important industry developments.

In July 2026, Dubai Aerospace Enterprise (DAE) completed its acquisition of Macquarie AirFinance in a transaction with an enterprise value of approximately US$9 billion. Following the acquisition, DAE reported a combined portfolio of approximately 1,000 owned, managed and committed aircraft, with a fleet value of approximately US$35 billion. The company stated that the transaction made it the world’s third-largest lessor by fleet value and by the number of owned and managed aircraft.

AerCap reported a portfolio of approximately 1,589 aircraft as of 30 June 2026, alongside an order book of 400 aircraft. Its portfolio also included engines and helicopters.

SMBC Aviation Capital reported 1,884 owned, serviced and committed aircraft as of 30 June 2026, a figure adjusted to reflect an additional order for 100 Airbus aircraft in July.

In October 2026, Avolon reported a total portfolio of 1,092 aircraft, comprising 561 owned aircraft, 32 managed aircraft and 499 fleet commitments. The company also announced orders for 250 aircraft from Boeing and Airbus, subject to approval by its majority shareholder, together with an option to acquire a further 100 Airbus aircraft. The new orders increased its reported aircraft order book to 749.

The following table lists the ten largest aircraft leasing companies by reported aircraft portfolio size, according to the Aviation Leaders Report 2026. Portfolio figures and rankings may differ from company-reported fleet totals because sources use different definitions and reporting dates.

Sources: Aviation Leaders Report 2026
Rank	Aircraft lessor	Total portfolio (aircraft)	Backlog (aircraft)
1	AerCap	1,734	278
2	SMBC Aviation Capital	783	227
3	Avolon	685	460
4	Dubai Aerospace Enterprise	622	74
5	Air Lease Corporation	592	216
6	BBAM	543	0
7	ICBC Leasing	488	—
8	BOC Aviation	468	—
9	Carlyle Aviation Partners	356	—
10	Aviation Capital Group	325	—
