= List of Airbus A220 orders and deliveries =

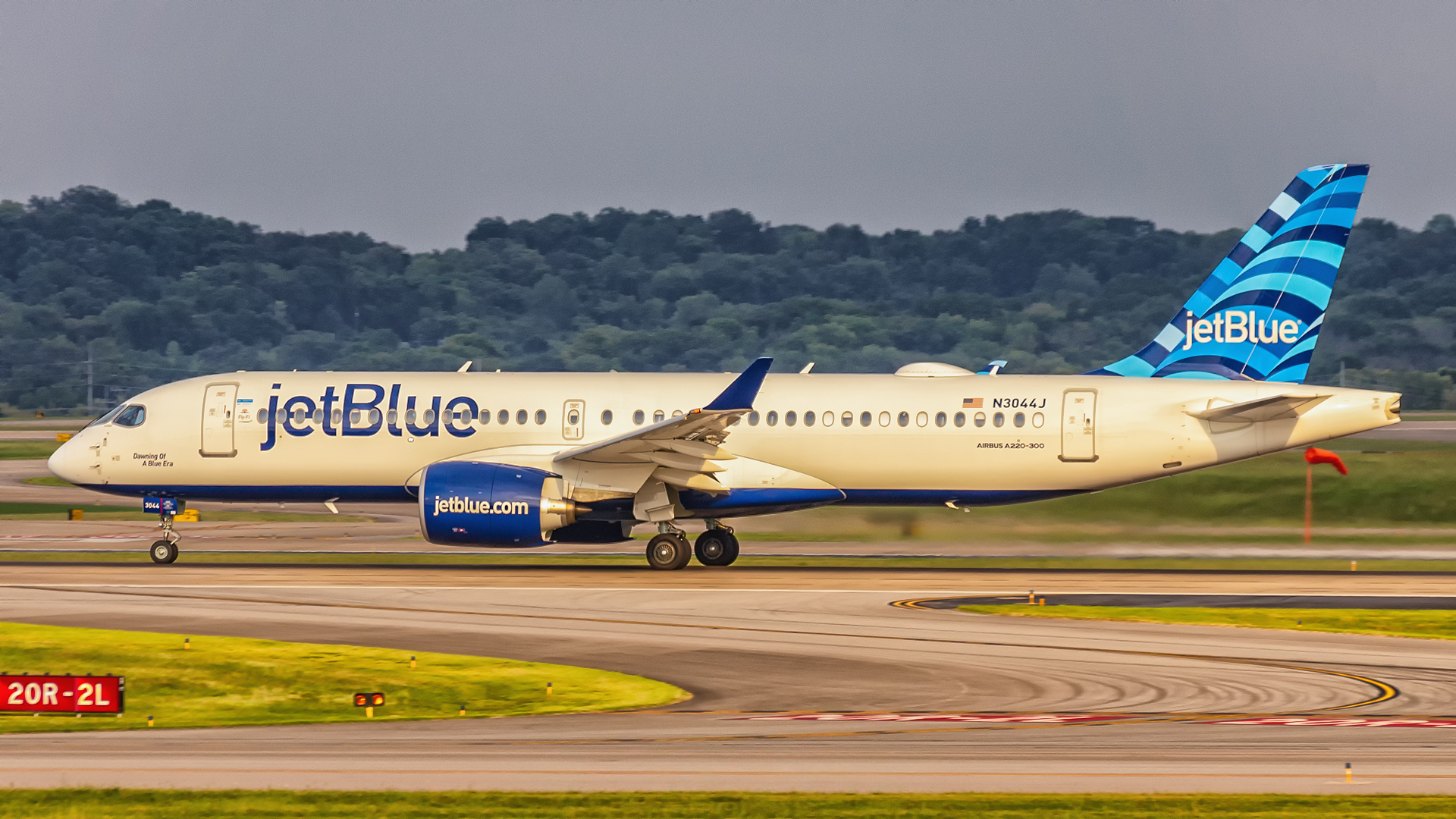
JetBlue Airways is currently the second-largest A220 customer.

This article describes sales, lists orders and deliveries for the Airbus A220 family aircraft currently in production by Airbus Canada Limited Partnership (ACLP), a joint venture between Airbus and Investissement Québec.

The five-abreast narrow-body airliner was marketed as Bombardier CSeries prior to its acquisition by Airbus in 2018 and has since been marketed as the Airbus A220. The small variant A220-100 (formerly CS100) competes with the Embraer E195-E2 and the smaller E190-E2, while the longer variant A220-300 (formerly CS300) complements the Airbus A319neo in competing against the Boeing 737-700 and now-certified 737 MAX 7.

== Orders and deliveries ==
=== By type ===
The A220 family has a market share of more than 55% in the small commercial aircraft sector as of July 2024.. In May 2026, the total order for the A220 family exceeded 1,000 aircraft. It has 1,105 firm orders from 35 customers, of which AirAsia is the largest with 150 orders, and a total of 559 aircraft have been delivered as of October 2026.

In May 2026, AirAsia placed a record order of 150 A220-300 and became the first customer for the high-density A220-300 with 160 seat configuration. The order confirmed the aircraft's ability to serve both premium regional sector and the low-cost sector, which was seen as "one of the most strategically important developments for the programme since airBaltic transformed the aircraft from a niche regional jet into a globally recognised narrowbody success story."

Orders and deliveries by type (summary)
Type	Orders	Deliveries	Backlog
A220-100	108	75	33
A220-300	997	484	513
A220 family	1,105	559	546

=== By year ===
A220 family orders and deliveries by year (distributive)
	2009	2010	2011	2012	2013	2014	2015	2016	2017	2018	2019	2020	2021	2022	2023	2024	2025	2026	Total
Orders	50	40	43	15	34	61	—	117	12	165 (Note: The first 402 firm orders through June 2018 were booked as CSeries, but some of these were later canceled)	63	30	38	105	141	−9	44	156	1,105
Deliveries	—	—	—	—	—	—	—	7	17	33 (Note: The first 37 deliveries through June 2018 were made as CSeries: 8 as CS100 and 29 as CS300)	48	38	50	53	68	75	93	77	559

A220 family orders and deliveries by year (cumulative)
Orders Deliveries
Data as of October 2026.

=== By customer ===
A220 family orders and deliveries by customer (distributive)
Customer	A220-100		A220-300		A220 family		Notes
Customer	Orders	Deliveries	Orders	Deliveries	Orders	Deliveries (Note: the first 37 aircraft were delivered as CSeries:)	Notes
Non-commercial	8	5	2		10	5	Governments; Executive and private: ACJ 220
Air Austral			3	3	3	3	First A220 customer based in the Indian Ocean region
Air Asia			150		150		AirAsia places landmark order for 150 A220s | Airbus
airBaltic			90	50 (Note: 9 deliveries as CS300)	90	50	Launch operator for A220-300 variant^{[N]}
Air Canada			65	49	65	49	To replace existing Embraer 190s and older Airbus A320s. First North American carrier for the -300 variant.
Air France-KLM			60	58	60	58	Ordered for Air France, to replace existing Airbus A318s and Airbus A319s.
Air Lease Corporation	9	9	36	36	45	45	
Air Niugini	8				8		
Air Tanzania			4	4	4	4	Leased from the Tanzania Government Flight Agency
Air Vanuatu	2		1		3		
Aviation Capital Group			20	5	20	5	
Azorra Aviation			28	15	28	15	Two leased to Animawings.
BermudAir			10		10		
Breeze Airways			90	57	90	57	Ordered an additional 10 A220-300s on 20 February 2024.
Carlyle Aviation Partners			1	1	1	1	
Delta Air Lines	45	45	100	47	145	92	First A220-100 operator in North America.
EgyptAir			12	12	12	12	Ordered for EgyptAir Express, to completely replace existing Embraer 170 fleet
Griffin Global Asset			6	4	6	4	Existing order transferred from Croatia Airlines
GTLK			6	6	6	6	One leased to Air Manas
Ibom Air			10	2	10	2	
Iraqi Airways			5	5	5	5	
ITA Airways	7	7			7	7	
jetBlue			100	67	100	67	To completely replace existing Embraer 190 fleet
Korean Air			10	10 (Note: 5 deliveries as CS300)	10	10	The third operator of the A220, first A220 customer in East Asian region
LOT Polish Airlines	20		20		40		Order for 20 A220-100s and 20 A220-300s with options for additional 44 units.
Lufthansa Group for Swiss Air Lines	9	9 (Note: 8 deliveries as CS100)	21	21 (Note: 15 deliveries as CS300)	30	30	Launch customer, ordered for Swiss Air Lines
Lufthansa Group for City Airlines			40		40		Ordered in December 2023 for the group
Macquarie AirFinance			14	5	14	5	
Nordic Aviation Capital			2	2	2	2	
Qantas for QantasLink			29	15	29	15	
SMBC Aviation Capital			31	1	1	1	Transferred from Air Lease Corp
Undisclosed			33		33		
Total	108	75	999	475	1107	550	
Backlog	33		524		557		

Data as of September 2026

=== By date ===
Firm order
Cancelled order

A220 family orders by date (distributive)
Date	Customer	A220 -100	A220 -300	A220 family	Options	Purchase rights	Press Release
10 March 2009	Lufthansa Group for Swiss International Air Lines	30		30	30		
30 March 2009	Lease Corporation International	3	17	20	20		
25 February 2010	Republic Airways Holdings		40	40	40		
1 June 2011	Braathens Leasing Ltd. for Braathens Regional Aviation	5	5	10	10		
7 June 2011	Undisclosed^{[B]}	3		3	3		
20 June 2011	Gulf Air^{[C]}	10		10	6		
24 June 2011	Odyssey Airlines^{[D]}	10		10			
29 July 2011	Korean Air		10	10	10	10	
19 January 2012	PrivatAir	5		5	5		
20 December 2012	airBaltic		10	10		10	
31 March 2013	Undisclosed^{[B]}	-3		-3	-3		
4 June 2013	Ilyushin Finance Co.		32	32	10		
4 December 2013	Iraqi Airways		5	5	11		
16 January 2014	Al Qahtani Aviation Company for SaudiGulf		16	16	10		
9 February 2014	airBaltic^{[H]}		3	3		-3	
14 July 2014	Falcon Aviation Services^{[I]}		2	2			
26 September 2014	Macquarie AirFinance		40	40	10		
15 June 2015	Lufthansa Group for Swiss International Air Lines^{[A]}	-10	10	0			
12 April 2016	airBaltic		7	7		-7	
28 April 2016	Delta Air Lines	75		75	50		
4 June 2016	Lufthansa Group for Swiss International Air Lines^{[A]}	-5	5	0			
28 June 2016	Air Canada		45	45	30		
5 August 2016	Ilyushin Finance Co.^{[M]}		-12	-12	-10		
2 December 2016	Tanzanian Government Flight Agency for Air Tanzania		2	2			
16 March 2017	Lufthansa Group for Swiss International Air Lines^{[A]}	-5	5	0			
30 June 2017	Braathens Regional Aviation^{[O]}	5	-5	0			
29 December 2017	EgyptAir		12	12		12	
31 March 2018	Ilyushin Finance Co.^{[P]}		-6	-6			
31 March 2018	GTLK State Transport Leasing Co.^{[P]}		6	6			
28 May 2018	airBaltic		30	30		30	
5 December 2018	PrivatAir	-5		-5	-5		
31 December 2018	jetBlue		60	60	60		
27 December 2018	Breeze (former known as Moxy)		60	60			
31 December 2018	Delta Air Lines	-35	50	15	-15		
25 February 2019	Air Vanuatu	2	2	4			
18 June 2019	Delta Air Lines	5		5			
20 June 2019	jetBlue		10	10	-10		
8 August 2019	Republic Airways Holdings		-40	-40	-40		
8 August 2019	Lease Corporation International	-3	-17	-20	-20		
September 2019	Lufthansa Group for Swiss International Air Lines^{[A]}	-1	1	0			
September 2019	Undisclosed	8		8			
October 2019	Air Austral		3	3			
October 2019	Tanzanian Government Flight Agency for Air Tanzania		2	2			
November 2019	Czech Airlines		4	4			
18 December 2019	Air France		60	60			
December 2019	Braathens Regional Aviation	-10		-10			
December 2019	Nordic Aviation Capital	6	14	20			
January 2020	Air Lease Corporation		50	50			
January 2020	Air Senegal		8	8			
March 2020	Al Qahtani Aviation Company for SaudiGulf		-16	-16	-10		
March 2020	Nordic Aviation Capital	-1	1	0			
November 2020	Air Canada		-12	-12			
November 2021	Air Canada		2	2			
31 December 2020	Gulf Air	-10		-10	-6		
13 September 2021	Breeze Airways		20	20	40		
16 November 2021	Ibom Air		10	10			
1 December 2021	ITA Airways	7		7			
20 December 2021	Air Lease Corporation		25	25			
31 December 2021	Air Lease Corporation	6	-6	0			
10 January 2022	Azorra Aviation	2	20	22			
14 February 2022	Aviation Capital Group (ACG)		20	20			
15 February 2022	jetBlue		30	30	-30		
18 February 2022	Air Canada		10	10			
2 May 2022	Qantas		20	20	9		
18 July 2022	Delta Air Lines		12	12			
18 July 2022	Croatia Airlines		6	6			
31 July 2022	Air Lease Corporation	1	-1	0			
26 September 2022	Macquarie AirFinance		-13	-13			
18 January 2023	Delta Air Lines		12	12			
23 February 2023	Qantas		9	9	-9		
13 July 2023	Delta Air Lines		12	12	-12		
31 July 2023	Air Lease Corporation	2	-2	0			
October 2023	Macquarie AirFinance		-1	-1			
6 October 2023	Air Niugini	6		6			
20 October 2023	Undisclosed		8	8			
13 November 2023	Air Baltic		30	30		20	
11 December 2023	Private Customer	1		1			
22 December 2023	Undisclosed		10	10			
29 December 2023	Lufthansa Group for City Airlines		40	40	20		
29 December 2023	Delta Air Lines		14	14			
20 February 2024	Breeze Airways		10	10	-10		
31 May 2024	Nordic Aviation Capital	-2	-10	-12			
12 August 2024	airBaltic		10	10	-10		
30 November 2024	Ilyushin Finance Co.		-14	-14			
19 December 2024	Air Canada		5	5	-5		
27 December 2024	Undisclosed	2		2			
31 January 2025	Undisclosed	-1		-1			
28 May 2025	Air Niugini	2		2			
16 June 2025	LOT Polish Airlines	20	20	40	44		
31 July 2025	Macquarie AirFinance		-3	-3			
31 October 2025	Macquarie AirFinance		-1	-1			
19 December 2025	Undisclosed		9	9			
24 March 2026	Undisclosed		10	10			
31 March 2026	Odyssey Airlines	-10		-10			
31 March 2026	Undisclosed		10	10			
30 April 2026	Macquarie AirFinance		-1	-1			
30 April 2026	Undisclosed		2	2			
4 May 2026	Azorra Aviation		6	6			
28 May 2026	AirAsia		150	150			
31 May 2026	Macquarie AirFinance		-1	-1			
31 May 2026	Nordic Aviation Capital		-6	-6			
Total firm orders		108	1001	1109	199	72	

Data as of May 2026

== Sales history ==
Below is the sales history in text, table and graph form, most of which were non-firm orders.

=== A220 family (2018 - present) ===
2018

After the partnership took effect on 1 July 2018, the main stakeholder Airbus assisted in marketing and servicing of the aircraft. On 10 July 2018, hours after the CSeries programme was renamed A220, JetBlue Airways ordered 60 A220-300s (former CS300) to replace its 60 Embraer 190s from 2020 with 40% lower fuel burn per seat, a blow to Embraer which was marketing the E195-E2 to the carrier. Priced at $5.4 billion before customary discounts, they should be delivered from Mobile, Alabama, some could be converted to the A220-100 (former CS100) and 60 options are pending from 2025. JetBlue found the two models very close economically, as the A220-300 fuel seat cost is 40% lower than its current E190 and operating cost per seat excluding fuel are 22% lower.

Since July 2018, Airbus has promoted the A220 to airlines in Southeast Asia in particular, highlighting low operating costs for regional jet operators and low seat-mile costs for the low-cost carriers that dominate this price-sensitive market. Airbus believes that the A220 has a role to play in the rise of point-to-point traffic in the region, especially on new routes with thin initial demand.

2019

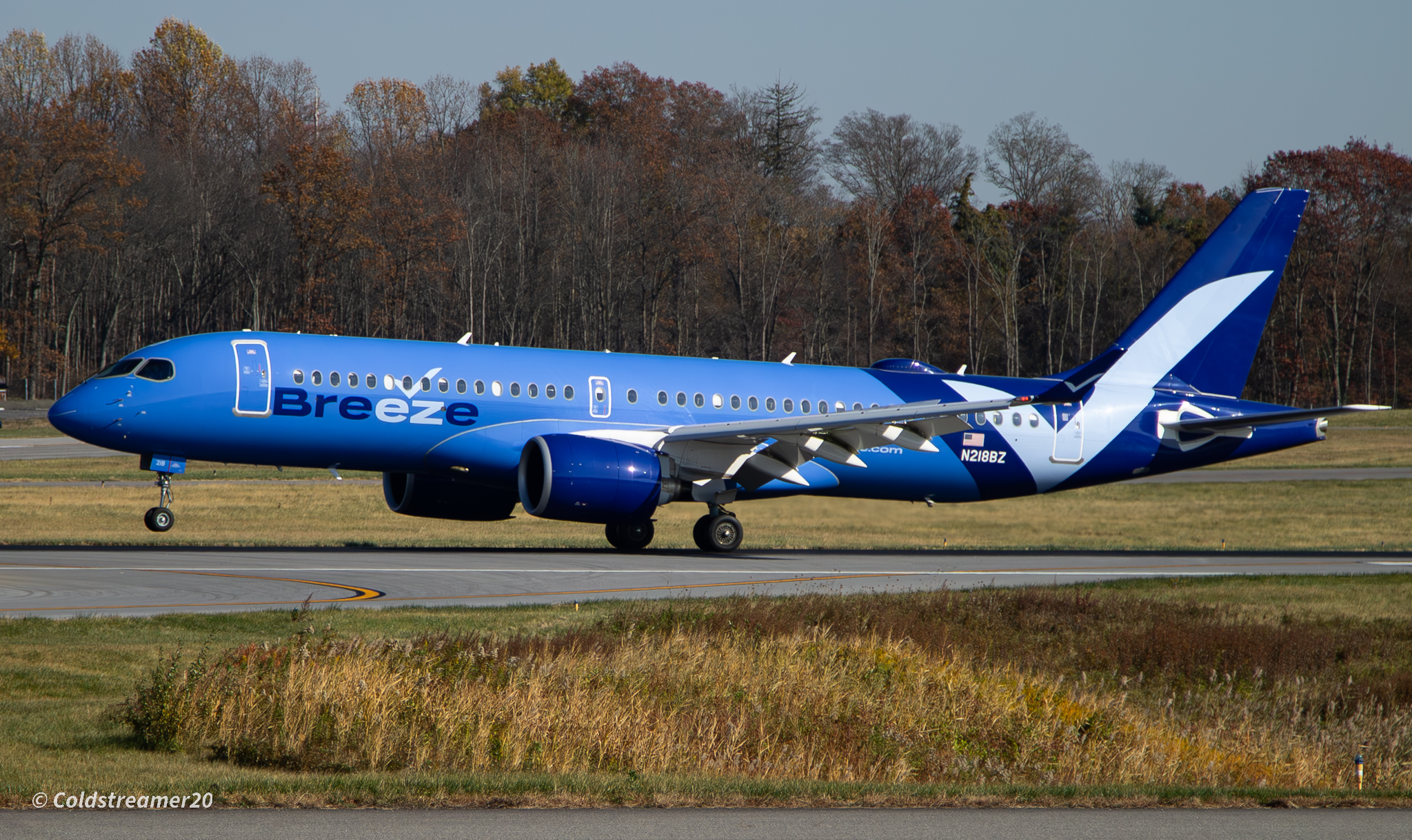
Breeze Airways firmed its order of 60 A220-300s in January 2019.

In January 2019, confirmation of sales to JetBlue and Moxy Airways (later Breeze Airways) pushed the A220 order backlog to more than double that of the slightly larger A319neo. Delta Air Lines ordered 15 further A220s for a total of 90 until 2023, including a conversion of 50 to the larger 130-seat A220-300 from 2020. Airbus acknowledged that competition between the A220-300 and the A319neo was resulting in fewer A319 orders, but confirmed that the A319neo will not be discontinued. In May 2019, a Delta Enhanced Equipment Trust Certificate report indicated the A220-100 mean appraised value was $34.1 million per aircraft, but there was wide variation.

At the Paris Air Show 2019, Air Lease Corporation (ALC) signed a letter of intent for 50 A220-300s, thus becoming the first major leasing company to order the type. In July 2019, Air France–KLM announced a commitment for 60 A220-300s, plus options for a further 60 aircraft, to be delivered from September 2021 to replace Air France's A318 and A319 fleet. Air France noted its interest in converting some orders to a stretched variant of the A220. The Memorandum of Understanding (MOU) would bring the backlog to a total of 611 aircraft, although up to 110 of these are indefinitely deferred "ghost" orders recorded before the Airbus partnership. On 14 October 2019, Air Austral, France's Réunion Island-based airline, signed a firm order for three A220-300 aircraft as part of the renewal of its Medium and Short Haul fleet. At the November 2019 Dubai Air Show, the flag carrier Air Senegal signed an MoU for eight A220-300s, the airline's largest order so far. On 18 December 2019, the Air France–KLM airline holding company finally firmed up order for 60 Airbus A220s.

2020

In January 2020, the leading lessor of regional aircraft Nordic Aviation Capital (NAC) officially finalised an order for 20 A220 aircraft. The MoU was signed in June 2019 at the Paris Air Show and it was counted in the 2019 order-book because the corresponding firm order was signed at the end of 2019. Also in January 2020, Air Senegal finalised its order for eight A220-300s, the MoU of which the airline signed in November 2019 at the Dubai Air Show.

In October 2020, Southwest Airlines, an all-Boeing carrier since establishment and the world's largest operator of the 737 family, announced that it was considering the A220 beside the yet-to-be-certified 737 MAX 7 to replace its 737-700 fleet from 2025. The speculation ended however in March 2021, when the airline announced an order for 100 Boeing 737 MAX 7 and said that negotiations with Airbus were never initiated. In December 2020, Air France's CEO, Ben Smith, said that a stretched A220 would be ideal to replace its larger narrow-bodies, the A320 and A321, but that if it is not developed on time, the company might consider the 737 MAX.

2021

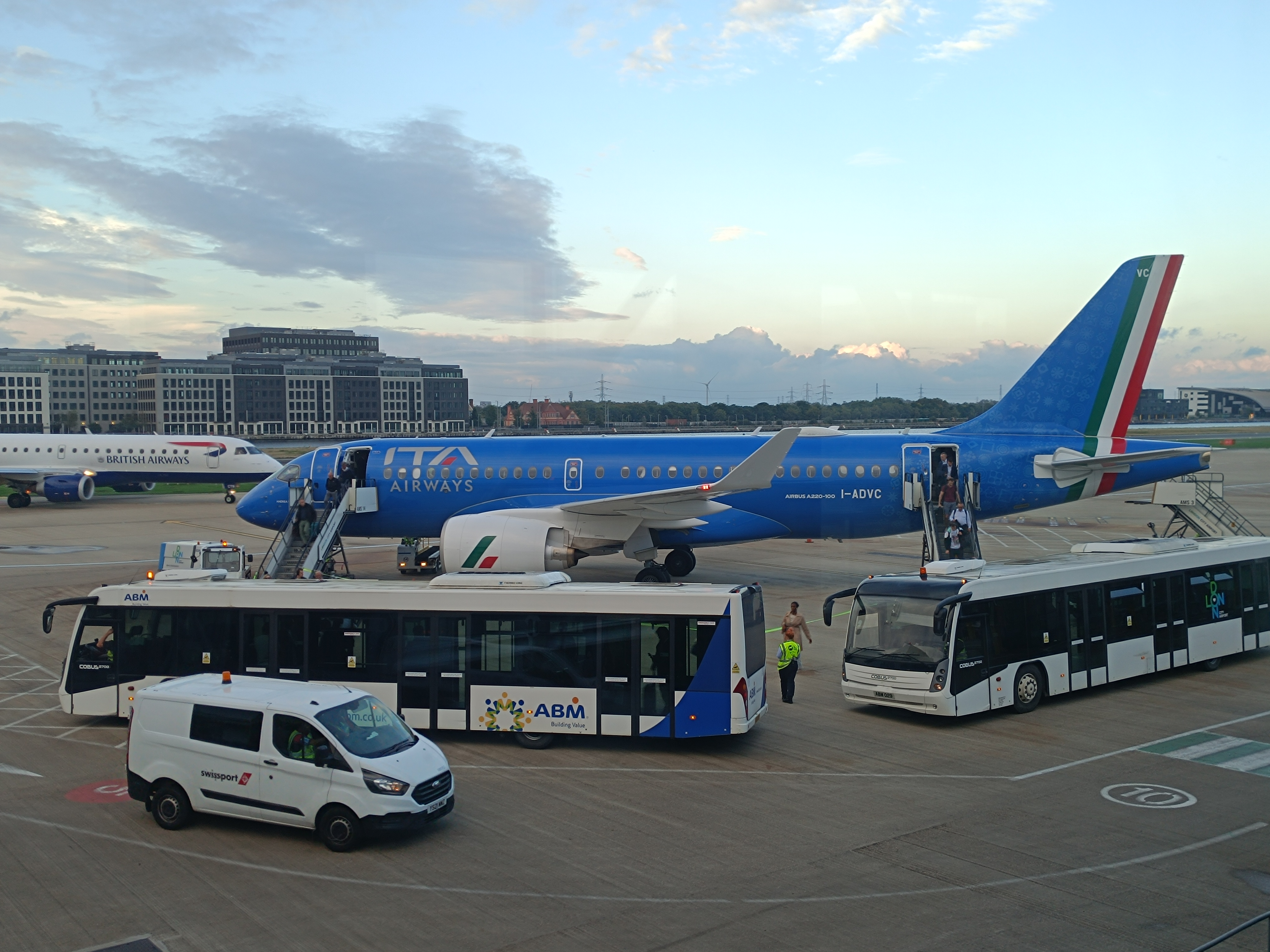
ITA Airways, the new Italian flag carrier, ordered A220s in December 2021.

In the monthly orders and deliveries report for March 2021, Airbus announced that an undisclosed customer had ordered 20 A220-300s, bringing a total of 649 A220 aircraft to order. Later, on 13 September 2021, Breeze Airways confirmed the order of additional 20 A220-300s, bringing its total orders up to 80 aircraft of this type, second behind Delta. On 21 July 2021, the third day of the Moscow International Airshow (MAKS), Russian independent carrier Azimuth Airlines signed a leasing agreement for six A220-300s with ALC. It was the first order since the aircraft secured certification from the country's federal aviation regulator Rosaviatsia. In September 2021, Airbus China entered into talks with the Civil Aviation Administration of China over the A220's certification in the country, as some airlines from the western part of the country expressed their interest for the jetliner. With a passenger seat capacity between the Comac ARJ21 regional jet and the Comac C919 narrow-body, the Airbus A220 could become an attractive option for the Chinese aviation market.

At the Dubai Air Show in November 2021, the first major air show since the COVID-19 pandemic began, ALC and Ibom Air ordered 25 and 10 A220s, respectively. On 1 December 2021, ITA Airways, Italy's new flag carrier, firmed up an order for seven A220s, 11 A320neos and 10 A330neos, which confirmed the MOU announced in September. On 17 December 2021, Qantas selected the A220 as well as A320neo families as the preferred airliner for the long-term renewal of its domestic narrow-body fleet. A firm commitment for 20 A220-300s with purchase right options for the smaller A220-100 to replace the Boeing 717 fleet of QantasLink is expected to be placed by the end of 2022.

2022

After considering A220-300 as well as A320neo for its fleet expansion, the ultra-low cost airline (ULCC) Allegiant Air ordered 737 MAX on 6 January 2022. The ULCC was concerned about the low production rates of the A220 and the uncertainty surrounding the flexibility of the aircraft family, as the stretched A220 variant or the A220-500 programme was still not officially launched. On 10 January 2022, Airbus signed a purchase agreement with the Fort Lauderdale, Florida, based aircraft lessor Azorra Aviation for 22 A220s including twenty A220-300s and two ACJ TwoTwenty aircraft.

At the Singapore Air Show in February 2022, the full-service aircraft lessor Aviation Capital Group (ACG), wholly owned by Tokyo Century Corporation, signed a firm contract for 20 A220s on 14 February following its order for 40 A320neo family aircraft announced in December 2021. A day later, on 15 February, JetBlue signed a firm order for an additional 30 A220-300s, making the airline the largest A220 customer with 100 aircraft ordered and lifting the total order book for the A220 family to 740. On 19 July, at the Farnborough Air Show, Delta firmed up orders for 12 A220-300 aircraft, bringing its total firm order for A220s to 107 aircraft, regaining its title as largest customer of the type. On 29 November, Croatia’s flag carrier, Croatia Airlines, signed a firm order for six A220-300s. The airline plans further to lease an additional nine A220s, taking its total commitment for the type to 15 aircraft.

2023

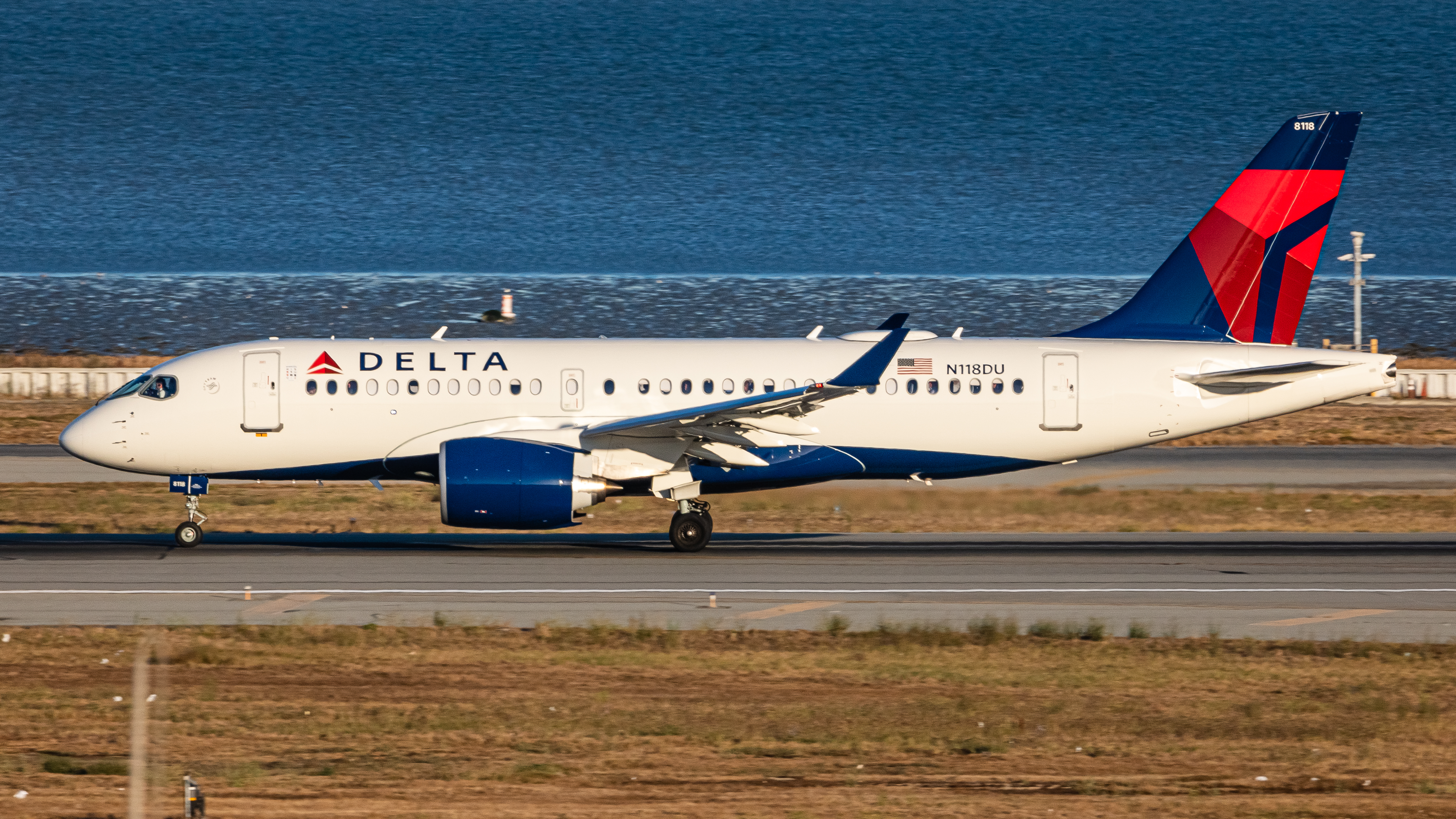
Delta strengthening its position as the largest A220 customer and operator with further orders in 2023

On 18 January 2023, Delta ordered a dozen more A220-300s, bringing the airline's total order for the A220 Family to 119 aircraft and strengthening its position as the largest A220 customer and operator. On 23 February 2023, Qantas turned purchase rights for 9 A220-300 aircraft into an intent to order (LOI) for delivery in FY2026 and 2027, and confirmed the order at the Paris Air Show on 20 June 2023. During the air show, TAAG Angola Airlines confirmed on 19 June 2023 that they would lease an additional four A220-300s from ACG, with deliveries beginning in January 2025, and adding three more from Azorra a day later. On 13 July 2023, Delta exercised options on a dozen A220-300s, bringing its total order for the A220 Family to 131 aircraft, further improving fuel efficiency, and streamlining its fleet. On 16 August 2023, Air Niugini had chosen the A220 over the Embraer E195-E2 for domestic and international flights due to the larger capacity, comfort and higher operational efficiency. The firm order for six A220-100s was signed with Airbus on 1 November 2023, while three A220-300s and two further A220-100s were to be leased. Deliveries of the jets would begin in the first quarter of 2025 and would replace the airline's existing Fokker 100s and Fokker 70s as part of a broader fleet renewal programme. On 13 November 2023, during the Dubai Airshow, Air Baltic ordered a further 30 A220-300, with purchase rights for 20 more. On 19 December 2023 Lufthansa ordered a further 40 A220-300 aircraft to be operated by City Airlines with options for 20 more.

2024

On 20 February 2024, Breeze Airways disclosed an order for 10 additional A220-300s, making Breeze the third largest A220 customer with a total order of 90 aircraft, targeting an all A220 fleet by the end of 2024. The A220 family has a market share of more than 55% in the small commercial aircraft sector as of July 2024. On 13 August 2024, airBaltic, the largest A220 customer in Europe, placed an order for ten additional A220-300s, also bringing the airline's total order to 90 aircraft.

=== CSeries (2008 - 2018) ===
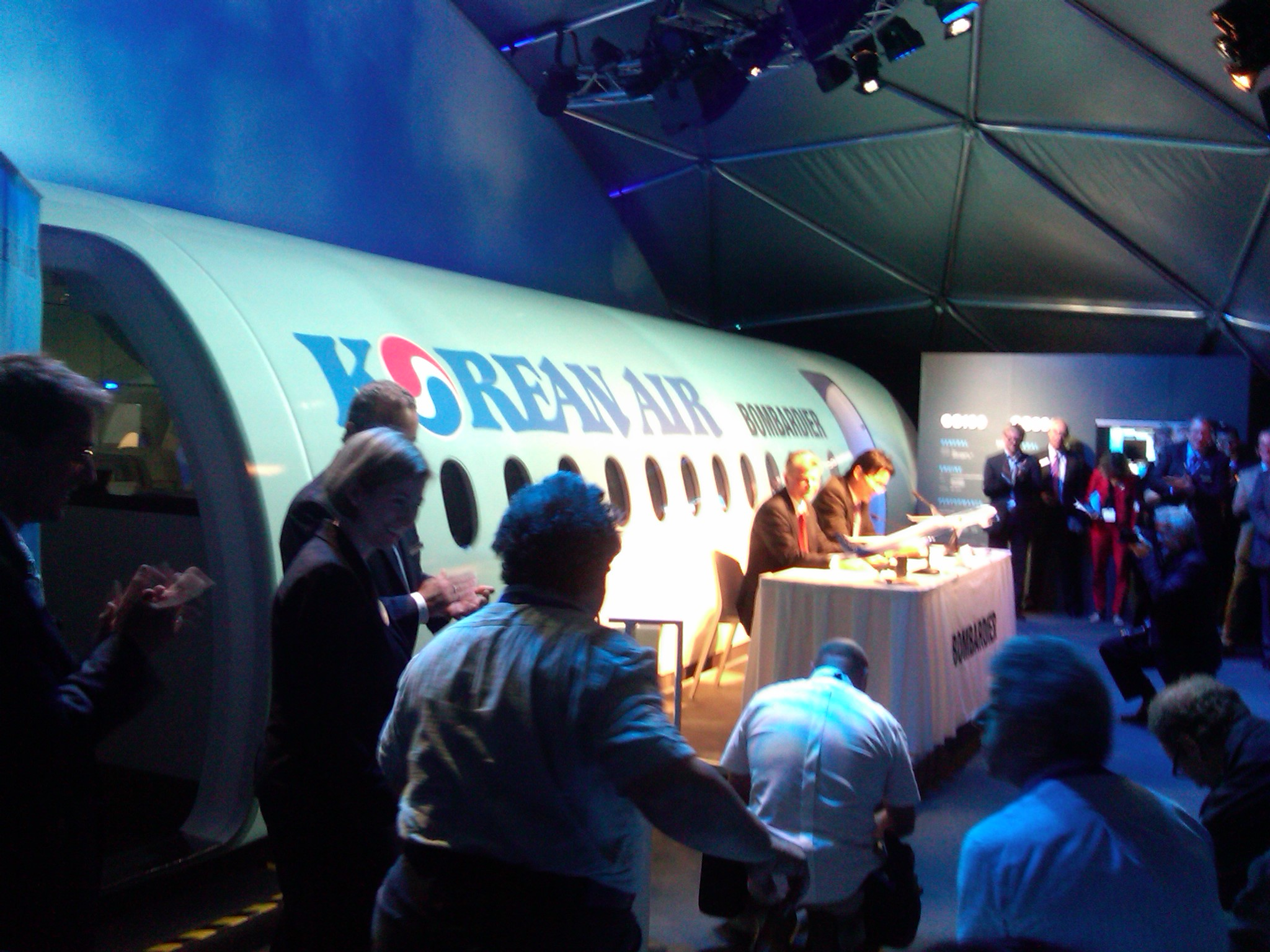
Korean Air placed an order for ten CSeries at the 2011 Paris Air Show.

On 13 July 2008, on the eve of the opening of the Farnborough Airshow, Lufthansa became launch customer of the CSeries, with a letter of intent for 60 aircraft, including 30 options, at a US$46.7 million list price. In December 2009, United Airlines expressed interest in using the CS100 and CS300 for replacing its aging 737-300 and 737-500 aircraft, however a future order is unlikely as the airline has made orders for the Airbus A319-100 and the Boeing 737-800. In March 2010, easyJet stated that the company was having "ongoing discussions with Bombardier regarding its CSeries, but the airline had since ordered the Airbus A320-200 and A320neo. On 21 June 2011, at the Paris Air Show, South Korea's flag carrier, Korean Air, agreed to purchase ten CS300, with an option to purchase ten more and acquire rights to another ten aircraft.

2016

On 17 February 2016, Air Canada signed a Letter of Intent (LOI) with Bombardier for up to 75 CS300 aircraft as part of its narrowbody fleet renewal plan. This comprised 45 firm orders, plus options for an additional 30 aircraft. It includes substitution rights to CS100 aircraft in certain circumstances, with deliveries to occur from late 2019 to 2022. The $3.8 billion order for 45 CS300 aircraft was finalized on 28 June 2016. On 14 April, Bombardier shares were at a six-month high based on then-unconfirmed rumours that Delta Air Lines had ordered the CSeries. On 28 April, finally, Bombardier and Delta announced a sale for 75 CS100 firm orders and 50 options; the first aircraft was to enter service in spring 2018. Airways News believed that a substantial 65 to 70% discount off the $71.8 million list price was provided making the final sale at $24.6–28.7 million price per aircraft; this large order from a major carrier could help Bombardier to break the Boeing/Airbus duopoly on narrow-body aircraft. With 127 firm orders in early 2016, introduction was to be with a firm backlog of more than 300 orders and up to 800 aircraft including options, conditional orders, LOI and purchase rights; they implied an onerous contract provision of around $500 million, which equates to $3.9 million per order.

2017

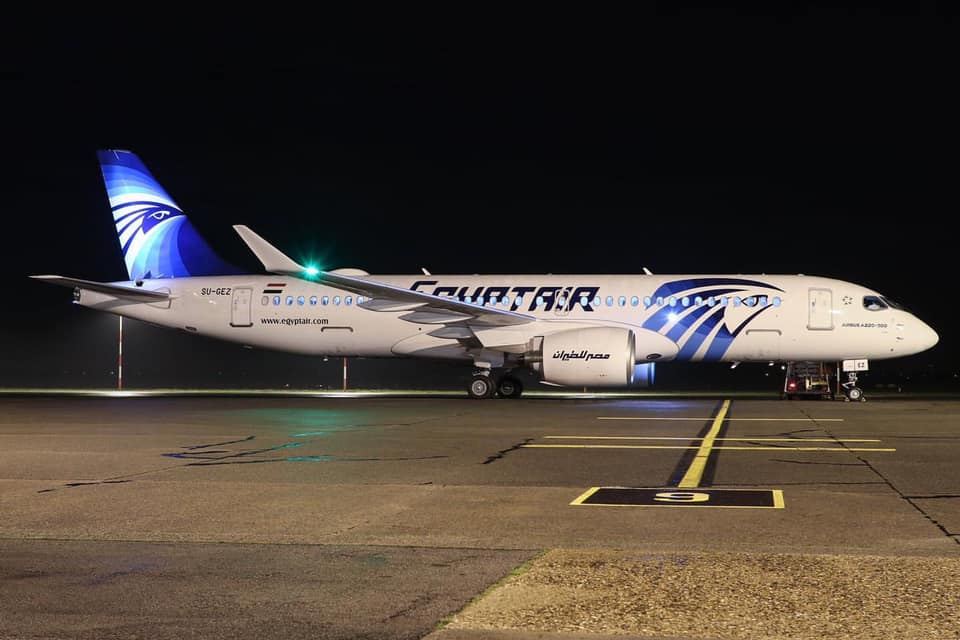
Egyptair placed an order for the CSeries at the 2017 Dubai Air Show.

At the November 2017 Dubai Air Show, the state-owned flag carrier Egyptair announced a LOI for 12 CS300s and 12 options. Bombardier previously received a LOI for 31 firm orders and 30 options from an unidentified European carrier. The two orders were to be finalised by the end of 2017, but only EgyptAir signed firm order for 12 CS300s with list price of around $1.1 billion on 29 December 2017, making the total orders 372 CSeries in 2017, in addition to the 115 commitments, 90 options and 18 purchase rights already held.

2018

By 2018, the unit costs of a 100 and 300 series were US$81 m and US$91.5 m. In March 2018, it was stated that Garuda Indonesia wanted to order the CS300 as a replacement for the Bombardier CRJ-1000. On 28 May 2018, the Latvia flag carrier airBaltic announced a firm order for 30 CS300 along with 15 options and 15 purchase rights.

==== Table ====
- Commitment
- Commitment converted into order

Date	Customer	CS100	CS300	TBD	CSeries	Options	Purchase rights	Press Release	Note
13 July 2008	Lufthansa Group for Swiss International Air Lines	(9)	(21)		(30)	(30)			Converted into firm order
21 June 2011	Korean Air		(10)		(10)	(10)	(10)		Converted into firm order
17 August 2011	Ilyushin Finance Co.	(3)	(7)		(10)	(10)	(10)		Converted into conditional order
15 November 2011	AtlasGlobal		10		10	5			
8 July 2012	CDB Leasing Co.^{[E]}	5	10		15	15			Conditional order
10 July 2012	airBaltic		(10)		(10)		(10)		Converted into firm order
19 December 2012	Porter Airlines^{[F]}	(12)			(12)	(18)			Converted commitment into conditional order
20 February 2013	Ilyushin Finance Co.		(32)		(32)	(10)			Conditional order converted into firm order
10 April 2013	Porter Airlines	12			12	18			Conditional order^{[G]}
19 November 2013	Iraqi Airways		(5)		(5)	(11)			Converted into firm order
26 February 2014	Falcon Aviation Services		(2)		(1)	(1)			Converted commitment and option into firm order
12 July 2014	Falko Regional Aircraft	24			24				
14 July 2014	Zhejiang Loong Airlines Co.	20			20				
14 July 2014	Air Arabia Jordan	2			2	2			
16 July 2014	Undisclosed African airline^{[J]}			5	5				
16 July 2014	Undisclosed existing customer^{[K]}		7		7		6		Conditional order
17 March 2015	flymojo	20			20	20			
17 February 2016	Air Canada		(45)		(45)	(30)			Converted into firm order
2 November 2017	Undisclosed European customer			31	31	30			
14 November 2017	EgyptAir		(12)		(12)		(12)		Converted into firm order
Total commitments		83	27	36	146	90	6		

== See also ==
Airbus aircraft

- List of Airbus A320 orders
- List of Airbus A320neo family orders
- List of Airbus A220 operators

Bombardier Aerospace aircraft

- List of Bombardier CRJ operators
- List of Bombardier Dash 8 operators

Similar aircraft

- List of Boeing 737 MAX orders
- List of Embraer E-Jet operators

== Notes ==
^{A} The carrier, in June 2015, converted 10 of the CS100 on order to CS300 frames for delivery in 2017. 5 more CS100 aircraft were converted to CS300 in June 2016. The remaining 5 CS100 were convertible to the larger variant within the end of 2016; Swiss announced with their 2016 financial results in March 2017 that they finalized the conversion.
^{B} The firm order signed by this undisclosed airline was terminated due to financial difficulties of the customer and removed from the backlog during the first quarter of 2013.
^{C} This order was originally announced as signed by an undisclosed airline, reported as a major network carrier. It was disclosed in June 2013 that the airline was Gulf Air. It was at first announced as the first operator of the CS100 aircraft, however, Gulf Air deferred their deliveries until 2018, as part of its restructuring plan. As a result, Braathens Regional Aviation was to be the first airline to receive the CS100, but declined the role due to the program's delays.
^{D} The contract signed by this new startup airline was originally announced as firmed by an undisclosed European airline. Media sources initially reported the customer as Odyssey Airlines. Bombardier revealed the identity of this customer during the 2013 Paris Air Show (June 17–23). At the end of March 2014, Odyssey CEO revealed that the CS100 the airline has on order would be delivered during 2016.
^{E} The lessor was originally disclosed as an unnamed customer. On October 18, 2013, Bombardier announced that CDB Leasing was the company that signed this conditional order and contextually added 15 options to the previous deal.
^{F} The airline was previously identified as an undisclosed airline in the Americas.
^{G} Porter Airlines specified that the two conditions that would have led to a firm contract would have been the approval by the Government of Canada, the city of Toronto and the Toronto Port Authority of an amendment to the Tripartite Agreement, that bans jet aircraft from operating into Billy Bishop Toronto City Airport (Toronto Island) and a runway extension of 168 metres (551 ft) on each end of the runway. The Government of Canada refused to open the agreement.
^{H} airBaltic signed a top up firm order at the Singapore Airshow in February 2014 and initially requested to remain unidentified. According to numbers provided by Bombardier, this order consisted of converted options. On July 14, 2014, Bombardier revealed the top up order came from airBaltic.
^{I} This order by was included in Bombardier's Q1 2014 Financial Report but not officially announced by a Press Release until the 2014 Farnborough Airshow in July.
^{J} This airline, which asked to remain unidentified at the time, is an existing Bombardier customer based in Africa.
^{K} Flightglobal reported that this top-up order came from existing customer Ilyushin Finance Co. The lessor's website also reports a total of 39 CS300 on order.
^{L} During the second quarter of 2016, following bankruptcy proceedings of Republic Airways Holdings, Bombardier removed Republic's order from its production plan, despite retaining it on the backlog.
^{M} Due to the economic situation in Russia, IFC revisited its order for 32 CS300 aircraft plus 10 option to 20 CS300 aircraft plus additional Bombardier Q400 aircraft.
^{N} On 17 June 2015 at the Paris Airshow, airBaltic confirmed it will be the launch operator of the CS300 in the fourth quarter of 2016. The airline received its first CS300 at the end of November 2016, commencing CSeries operations on the 14th December 2016.
^{O} In March 2017, Braathens Regional Aviation announced it would postpone all of its orders for the CSeries indefinitely after a new Swedish ticket tax was proposed which is expected to decrease passenger demand. Upon releasing of the second quarted financial result from Bombardier, the total order from Braathens Leasing is now consisting uniquely of CS100 aircraft, signifying a conversion by the customer completed during the quarter.
^{P} During the first quarter results conference, Bombardier announced that Ilyushin Finance had reassigned 6 of their CS300 on order to GTLK State Transport Leasing Co., to be leased to Red Wings Airlines and operated in cooperation with Nordavia.
^{Q} In June 2018 several news outlets have reported that a new start-up by David Neeleman, tentatively named Moxy Airways, was to order 60 CS300 aircraft to start operations in 2020. During the 2018 Farnbourough airshow, a consortium of investors signed a commitment with Airbus, with deliveries starting in 2021, although they dismissed the usage of Moxy in the name as that would be in conflict with the samely-named Moxy Hotels by Marriott International.
