= List of Airbus A320neo family orders and deliveries =

15223 This article lists the orders and deliveries for the Airbus A320neo family, currently produced by Airbus.

== Orders and deliveries by type ==
Orders and deliveries by type (summary)
Type	Orders	Deliveries	Backlog
A319neo	58	46	12
A320neo	4,417	2,507	1,910
A321neo	8,017	2,302	5,715
A320neo family	12,492	4,855	7,637

== Orders and deliveries by year ==
A320neo family orders and deliveries by year (distributive)
		2010	2011	2012	2013	2014	2015	2016	2017	2018	2019
Orders	A319neo	–	26	19	–	2	1	5	−22	22	−18
Orders	A320neo	30	1,081	378	387	824	540	269	416	149	−295
Orders	A321neo	14	119	81	341	183	346	287	532	360	965
Orders	A320neo family	44	1,226	478	728	1,009	887	561	926	531	652
Deliveries	A319neo	–	–	–	–	–	–	–	–	–	2
Deliveries	A320neo	–	–	–	–	–	–	68	161	284	381
Deliveries	A321neo	–	–	–	–	–	–	–	20	102	168
Deliveries	A320neo family	–	–	–	–	–	–	68	181	386	561

		2020	2021	2022	2023	2024	2025	2026	Total
Orders	A319neo	7	2	15	1	−4	–	1	58
Orders	A320neo	−305	−84	330	402	−39	69	293	4,417
Orders	A321neo	561	526	425	1,286	658	491	669	8,017
Orders	A320neo family	263	444	770	1,689	615	560	963	12,492
Deliveries	A319neo	–	2	6	7	9	15	5	46
Deliveries	A320neo	253	258	246	247	232	205	172	2,507
Deliveries	A321neo	178	199	264	317	361	387	306	2,302
Deliveries	A320neo family	431	459	516	571	602	607	483	4,855

A320neo family orders and deliveries by year (cumulative)

Orders
Deliveries

Data as of October 2026

== Orders and deliveries graph ==
Data as of June 2026

== Orders by customer ==
The following table shows total firm orders of A320neo family aircraft by customer and variant as of December 2021. In the engine columns, the boxes filled in with a * signify that the airline has ordered all their A320neo jets with that particular engine. Blank boxes in those columns signify that the airline or Airbus have not, as of now, specified which engine will be ordered.

Initial order date	Customer	A319neo	A320neo	A321neo	A321LR	A321XLR	A320neo family	CFM	PW
N/A	Governments; Executive and Private Jets	7	9	2			18		
19 August 2019	Accipiter Leasing		13	7			20	✓	
22 June 2018	Aegean Airlines		14	16			30		✓
27 April 2011	AerCap		180	136			316		
20 June 2019	Aer Lingus		6	-	7	6	19		
18 November 2019	Air Arabia		73	47	6	20	146		
23 June 2011	AirAsia		29	364			393		
30 August 2019	AirAsia X					20	20		
11 October 2017	Air Calin		2				2		✓
31 January 2022	Air Canada					30	30		✓
28 May 2013	Air China		18	15			33		✓
28 April 2016	Air Côte d'Ivoire		1				1	✓	
14 February 2023	Air India		167	70			237	✓	
20 June 2012	Air Lease Corporation		30	259			289		
1 June 2014	Air New Zealand		4	11			15		✓
2015	Air Transat				19	4	23		✓
14 November 2011	ALAFCO		75	10			85		
20 July 2011	American Airlines			169		50	219	✓	
27 March 2014	ANA Holdings		26	25			51		✓
N/A	Arctic Aviation Assets		7				7		
9 July 2012	Arkia				2		2	✓	
31 July 2015	Asiana Airlines			25			25	✓	
18 June 2019	Atlantic Airways		2				2	✓	
26 January 2012	Avianca		138				138	✓	
15 November 2011	Aviation Capital Group		115	65			180	✓ 18	✓ 12
17 December 2012	Avolon		181	38			219	✓	
1 December 2014	Azul Finance LLC		13	5			18	✓	
7 October 2026	Biman Bangladesh Airlines			6			6		
3 January 2020	Batik Air		1				1	✓	
N/A	BOC Aviation		86	22			108	✓	
N/A	BoComm Leasing		14				14	✓	
6 August 2015	British Airways		20	13			33	✓	
12 January 2015	CALC		107	66			173		✓ 18
19 September 2017	Cathay Pacific Aircraft Services Limited			32			32	✓	
N/A	CDB Leasing		60	30			90	✓	
8 August 2011	Cebu Pacific		16	123		10	149		✓
13 May 2019	China Airlines			11			11		✓
23 March 2016	China Eastern Airlines		70				70	✓	
29 June 2020	China Express Airlines (Huaxia Airlines)		10				10		✓
N/A	China Southern Airlines	2	16	27			45	50	✓
21 December 2012	Citilink		25				25	✓	
10 August 2011	CIT Leasing		20	1			21	✓ 15	✓ 30
13 December 2021	CMB Financial Leasing		14				14		
18 September 2015	Croatia Airlines		4				4		
14 December 2017	Delta Air Lines			155			155		✓
N/A	Druk Air		1				1	✓	
11 July 2013	easyJet		141	30			171	✓	
17 November 2013	Etihad Airways			26			26	✓ 26	
16 January 2017	Flynas		78	10			88	✓	
8 November 2011	Frontier Airlines		129	176			305	✓ 171	✓ 134
23 June 2011	Go First (suspended)		144				144		✓
N/A	Goshawk Aviation		12	8			20		
3 September 2012	Gulf Air		12		17		29	✓	
25 March 2013	Hawaiian Airlines			16			16		✓
5 November 2015	Iberia		22			6	28	✓	
30 August 2012	ICBC Leasing		24	20			44	✓	
6 July 2023	Icelandair					13	13		
22 June 2011	IndiGo		565	700		69	1,230	✓ 580+	✓ 150
13 November 2012	Interjet		2				2	✓	
22 June 2017	Iran Air		32				32	✓	
1 December 2021	ITA Airways		11				11	✓	
3 February 2022	Jazeera Airways		20	8			28	*	
31 August 2021	Jet2.com			146			146	✓	
27 October 2011	JetBlue			85	13	13	111		✓
N/A	JetSmart		42	50		14	106		✓
N/A	Juneyao Air		10	2			12		✓
3 November 2015	Korean Air			30			30		✓
19 February 2014	Kuwait Airways		9	9			18	✓	
22 June 2011	LATAM Airlines Group		38	63		13	114		✓
N/A	Loong Air		9				9	✓	
10 August 2011	Lufthansa		84	40			124	✓ 40	✓ 60
N/A	Macquarie Financial Holdings PTY Limited		20				20		
7 September 2021	Malta MedAir		3				3		
7 December 2012	Middle East Airlines			9		4	13		✓
16 June 2015	NAS Aviation Services		112	121			233	✓	
28 April 2017	Nile Air			2			2		
20 October 2016	Peach		9	1			10	✓	
18 December 2012	Pegasus Airlines		42	64			106	✓	
28 August 2012	Philippine Airlines			21			21		✓
6 October 2011	Qantas Group					20	20	89	20
25 September 2013	Qingdao Airlines		33		2		35		✓
5 May 2014	Royal Brunei Airlines		7				7	✓	
18 November 2019	SalamAir		1				1		
20 June 2011	SAS		65		3		69	✓	
18 June 2019	Saudia		30	35			65		
28 March 2019	SaudiGulf Airlines		10				10		
24 March 2014	Scoot		18	6			24		✓
N/A	Shenzhen Airlines		27				27		✓
N/A	Sichuan Airlines		8	5			13		✓
14 October 2020	Sky Airline			10			10		
14 October 2020	Sky Express		1	2			1		
N/A	SkyServ		4				4		
15 June 2014	SMBC Aviation Capital		140	42			182	✓ 35	✓ 30
29 December 2011	Spirit Airlines		86	26			143		✓
N/A	Spring Airlines		45	15			60	*	
17 September 2014	Swiss		17	8			25		25
13 November 2015	TAP Portugal		12	12			39	✓	
19 August 2019	Tigerair Taiwan		7				7		
N/A	Timaero Ireland		20				20		
15 August 2016	Tunisair		5				5		
15 March 2013	Turkish Airlines			88			88		✓
29 June 2021	United Airlines			130		50	180		✓
11 February 2014	VietJet Air			138			138		✓
24 May 2017	Vistara		52	10			62	✓	
14 July 2014	VivaAerobus		14	40			54		✓
N/A	Viva Air		26				26		✓
27 December 2011	Volaris		71	148			219		✓
6 August 2015	Vueling		33	11			44		✓
14 September 2015	Wizz Air		40	284		47	371		✓
13 January 2015	Yemenia		8				8		
N/A	Undisclosed customers	28	262	158			448		
Total orders		70	3,746	4,079	69	364	7,895	2,330	2,485

== Deliveries by customer ==
The following table shows total deliveries of A320neo family aircraft by customer and variant.

Customer	A319neo	A320neo	A321neo	Total
Airbus Executive and Private Aviation	9	15	2	26
Accipiter	—	12	3	15
Aegean Airlines	—	9	17	26
AerCap	—	151	134	285
Aer Lingus	—	6	6	12
Air Arabia	—	13	—	13
AirAsia	—	38	16	54
Aircalin	—	2	—	2
Air China	9	22	33	64
Air Côte d'Ivoire	—	1	—	1
Air Lease Corporation	—	30	136	166
Air New Zealand	—	4	9	13
ALAFCO	—	39	—	39
All Nippon Airways	—	22	22	44
American Airlines	—	—	86	86
Arctic Aviation Assets	—	7	—	7
Arkia	—	—	2	2
Asiana Airlines	—	—	13	13
Avianca	—	17	2	19
Aviation Capital Group	—	38	42	80
Avolon	—	99	9	108
Azul	—	9	3	12
BOC Aviation	—	74	12	86
BoComm	—	50	8	58
British Airways	—	36	20	56
Cathay Pacific	—	1	34	35
CDB	—	45	30	75
Cebu Pacific	—	13	20	33
Chengdu Airlines	—	14	5	19
China Aircraft Leasing Group	—	78	33	111
China Airlines	—	—	6	6
China Eastern Airlines	—	93	36	129
China Express Airlines	—	20	—	20
China Southern Airlines	9	34	67	110
CIT Group	—	20	1	21
CMB Financial Leasing	—	20	11	31
Colorful Guizhou Airlines	—	1	—	1
DAE Capital	—	2	—	2
Delta Air Lines	—	—	106	106
Druk Air	—	1	—	1
easyJet	—	79	33	112
Flynas	—	64	—	64
Frontier Airlines	—	95	59	154
GE Capital Aviation Services	—	100	85	185
Garuda Indonesia	—	8	—	8
GoAir	—	56	—	56
Gulf Air	—	9	16	25
Hawaiian Airlines	—	—	16	16
HK Express	—	5	—	5
Iberia	—	15	20	35
ICBC	—	45	33	78
IndiGo	—	230	204	434
Interjet	—	2	—	2
Jazeera Airways	—	2	—	2
Jet2	—	—	24	24
JetBlue	—	—	41	41
JetSmart	—	21	10	31
Juneyao Air	—	15	13	28
KLM	—	—	10	10
Korean Air	—	—	20	20
Kuwait Airways	—	9	3	12
LATAM Airlines Group	—	38	5	43
Lion Air	—	1	—	1
Loong Air	—	9	—	9
Lufthansa	—	66	25	91
Macquarie Financial Holdings PTY Limited	—	11	—	11
Malta Medair	—	3	—	3
Middle East Airlines	—	—	10	10
Peach Aviation	—	9	1	10
Pegasus Airlines	—	42	71	113
Philippine Airlines	—	—	8	8
Qantas	—	6	32	38
Qingdao Airlines	—	15	3	18
Royal Brunei Airlines	—	7	—	7
SalamAir	—	1	—	1
Saudia	—	30	17	47
Scandinavian Airlines	—	65	—	65
Scoot	—	13	5	18
Shenzhen Airlines	—	35	3	38
Sichuan Airlines	—	8	5	13
Sky Express	—	1	—	1
Skyserv	—	4	—	4
SMBC Aviation Capital	—	78	68	146
Spirit Airlines	—	56	4	60
Spring Airlines	—	40	11	51
Swiss	—	13	7	20
TAP Air Portugal	—	10	17	27
Tigerair Taiwan	—	2	—	2
Transavia	—	—	8	8
Transavia France	—	8	—	8
Tunisair	—	5	—	5
Turkish Airlines	—	—	53	53
United Airlines	—	—	64	64
VietJet Air	—	—	53	53
Vistara	—	13	—	13
VivaAerobus	—	20	36	56
Viva Air Perú	—	8	—	4
Volaris	—	43	26	69
Vueling	—	25	4	29
West Air	2	2	—	4
Wizz Air	—	6	212	218
Xiamen Airlines	—	8	2	10
Xizang Airlines	16	—	—	15
Total	45	2,492	2,263	4,800

Data as of September 2026

== See also ==
- Competition between Airbus and Boeing
- List of Airbus A320 orders
- List of Airbus A220 orders
- List of Boeing 737 MAX orders
- List of Airbus A320 family operators
