= List of Boeing 737 MAX orders and deliveries =

This article lists the orders made by airlines and other buyers for the Boeing 737 MAX family of aircraft, which is a product of Boeing Commercial Airplanes, a division of the Boeing Company.

For a discussion of these orders and deliveries, in particular, the effect of the groundings in 2019, see Boeing 737 MAX, Orders and deliveries.

== Orders and deliveries ==
=== Orders and deliveries by year ===
Boeing 737 MAX orders and deliveries
| | 2011 | 2012 | 2013 | 2014 | 2015 | 2016 | 2017 | 2018 | 2019 | 2020 | 2021 | 2022 | 2023 | 2024 | 2025 | 2026 | Total |
| Orders | 150 | 914 | 708 | 891 | 410 | 540 | 774 | 662 (Note: In 2018, there were 675 net orders for 737 program, of which 13 orders were for 737NG.) | −136 (Note: In 2019, there were 47 orders, but 183 cancellations of 737 MAX.) | −529 (Note: In 2020, there were 112 orders, but 641 cancellations of 737 MAX.) | 375 (Note: In 2021, there were 749 orders, but 374 cancellations of 737 MAX.) | 561 | 883 | 242 | 577 | 540 | 7,500 |
| Deliveries | – | – | – | – | – | – | 74 | 256 | 57 | 27 | 245 | 374 | 387 | 260 | 440 | 395 | 2,515 |

Cumulative Boeing 737 MAX orders and deliveries

Orders Deliveries — as of October 2026

=== Orders and deliveries by customer ===
The following table shows total firm orders and deliveries of Boeing 737 MAX aircraft by customer.

Boeing has 4,846 MAX aircraft in its backlog as of September 30, 2026.

Last complete update regarding orders and deliveries as of September 30, 2026.

| Initial order date (Note: Order date is based on the initial order for the Boeing 737 MAX aircraft placed by each customer, from Boeing Order & Delivery summary.) | Customer | Total orders | Total deliveries | | | | |
|---|---|---|---|---|---|---|---|
| Initial order date | Customer | Total orders | Total deliveries | March 2021 | 777 Partners | 38 | 38 |
| May 15, 2014 | 9 Air | 5 | 5 | | | | |
| June 12, 2015 | AerCap | 141 | 84 | | | | |
| September 29, 2016 | Aerolíneas Argentinas | 2 | 2 | | | | |
| November 5, 2012 | Aeroméxico | 26 | 26 | | | | |
| June 20, 2023 | Air Algerie | 8 | — | | | | |
| February 3, 2026 | Air Cambodia | 10 | — | | | | |
| March 31, 2014 | Air Canada | 40 | 40 | | | | |
| December 22, 2014 | Air China | 31 | 31 | | | | |
| July 13, 2016 | Air Europa | 11 | — | | | | |
| February 14, 2023 | Air India Express | 220 | 53 | | | | |
| July 3, 2012 | Air Lease Corporation | 129 | 129 | | | | |
| September 18, 2018 | Air Peace | 10 | — | | | | |
| January 18, 2024 | Akasa Air | 206 | 23 | | | | |
| October 11, 2012 | Alaska Airlines | 255 | 87 | | | | |
| January 4, 2022 | Allegiant Air | 50 | 21 | | | | |
| February 1, 2013 | American Airlines | 218 | 103 | | | | |
| January 29, 2019 | ANA Holdings | 38 | — | | | | |
| January 2022 | Arajet | 12 | 3 | | | | |
| May 9, 2016 | Arik Air | 8 | — | | | | |
| November 12, 2024 | Avia Solutions Group | 40 | — | | | | |
| December 20, 2012 | Aviation Capital Group | 134 | 25 | | | | |
| May 2025 | AviLease | 20 | — | | | | |
| September 18, 2012 | Avolon | 119 | 16 | | | | |
| August 2021 | Bain Capital | 10 | 10 | | | | |
| April 30, 2026 | Biman Bangladesh Airlines | 10 | — | | | | |
| September 2022 | BBAM | 5 | 5 | | | | |
| June 16, 2015 | BoComm Leasing | 3 | 3 | | | | |
| August 13, 2014 | BOC Aviation | 161 | 51 | | | | |
| March 21, 2014 | Business Jet / VIP Customer(s) | 10 | 8 | | | | |
| June 14, 2017 | CALC | 2 | 2 | | | | |
| March 1, 2014 | CDB Aviation | 44 | 38 | | | | |
| June 17, 2014 | China Eastern Airlines | 22 | 22 | | | | |
| December 17, 2015 | China Southern Airlines | 60 | 34 | | | | |
| June 19, 2013 | CIT Leasing Corporation | 5 | 5 | | | | |
| December 3, 2013 | Comair (South Africa) | 1 | 1 | | | | |
| May 30, 2013 | Copa Airlines | 132 | 53 | | | | |
| November 2017 | DAE AirFinance | 50 | 6 | | | | |
| November 2017 | DAE Aviation | 27 | 7 | | | | |
| July 18, 2022 | Delta Air Lines | 100 | — | | | | |
| September 27, 2016 | Donghai Airlines | 14 | 4 | | | | |
| April 2021 | Dubai Aerospace Enterprise | 71 | 39 | | | | |
| August 15, 2024 | El Al | 20 | — | | | | |
| October 29, 2014 | Enter Air | 6 | 2 | | | | |
| September 1, 2014 | Ethiopian Airlines | 61 | 21 | | | | |
| March 31, 2017 | Fiji Airways | 5 | 5 | | | | |
| December 31, 2013 | flydubai | 186 | 76 | | | | |
| September 2014 | Garuda Indonesia | 50 | 1 | | | | |
| October 1, 2012 | Gol Transportes Aéreos | 114 | 43 | | | | |
| January 2023 | Greater Bay Airlines | 15 | 2 | | | | |
| July 16, 2014 | Hainan Airlines | 7 | 7 | | | | |
| May 21, 2013 | ICBC Leasing | 20 | 20 | | | | |
| February 12, 2013 | Icelandair | 3 | 3 | | | | |
| June 29, 2018 | Jackson Square Aviation | 28 | 16 | | | | |
| March 23, 2023 | Japan Airlines | 38 | — | | | | |
| November 19, 2018 | Jeju Air | 32 | 12 | | | | |
| November 9, 2015 | Korean Air | 80 | 14 | | | | |
| November 2014 | Kunming Airlines | 2 | 2 | | | | |
| February 22, 2012 | Lion Air (Note: Launch customer of 737 MAX 8, MAX 9 and MAX 10 variants.) (Note: Including subsidiaries: Batik Air Malaysia, Batik Air and Thai Lion Air.) | 251 | 22 | | | | |
| December 19, 2023 | Lufthansa | 60 | — | | | | |
| March 2023 | Luxair | 10 | 2 | | | | |
| August 2018 | Lynx Air | 3 | 3 | | | | |
| March 21, 2025 | Malaysia Airlines | 30 | — | | | | |
| November 2016 | Mauritania Airlines | 1 | 1 | | | | |
| March 2017 | Minsheng Leasing | 14 | 12 | | | | |
| September 2012 | NAS Aviation Services | 25 | 25 | | | | |
| January 24, 2012 | Norwegian Air | 98 | 23 | | | | |
| May 27, 2014 | Okay Airways | 7 | — | | | | |
| October 19, 2015 | Oman Air | 10 | 10 | | | | |
| December 19, 2024 | Pegasus Airlines | 100 | — | | | | |
| December 2022 | Pembroke Capital | 5 | 5 | | | | |
| November 2021 | Phoenix Aviation Capital | 30 | 6 | | | | |
| May 27, 2014 | Qatar Airways | 3 | 3 | | | | |
| October 2017 | Republic of Iraq | 16 | 6 | | | | |
| July 4, 2013 | Royal Air Maroc | 2 | 2 | | | | |
| December 21, 2013 | Ruili Airlines | 36 | — | | | | |
| November 28, 2014 | Ryanair (Note: Launch customer of 737 MAX 200 variant.) (Note: Including subsidiaries: Buzz and Malta Air.) | 360 | 210 | | | | |
| March 28, 2018 | SCAT Airlines | 8 | 1 | | | | |
| April 29, 2014 | Shandong Airlines | 13 | 13 | | | | |
| December 30, 2014 | Shenzhen Airlines | 14 | 14 | | | | |
| November 2012 | SilkAir | 6 | 6 | | | | |
| November 9, 2012 | Singapore Airlines | 20 | 18 | | | | |
| November 10, 2022 | Skymark Airlines | 14 | — | | | | |
| March 13, 2018 | SkyUp Airlines | 7 | — | | | | |
| August 6, 2013 | Smartwings | 1 | 1 | | | | |
| November 10, 2014 | SMBC Aviation Capital | 252 | 36 | | | | |
| December 13, 2011 | Southwest Airlines (Note: Launch customer of 737 MAX 7 variant.) | 724 | 324 | | | | |
| October 23, 2013 | SpiceJet | 136 | 7 | | | | |
| February 12, 2014 | SunExpress | 87 | 23 | | | | |
| June 2021 | Tanzania | 2 | 2 | | | | |
| June 16, 2018 | TAROM | 5 | — | | | | |
| January 15, 2014 | Timaero Ireland | 19 | 2 | | | | |
| July 9, 2013 | TUI Group | 99 | 63 | | | | |
| May 8, 2013 | Turkish Airlines | 125 | 25 | | | | |
| October 2018 | Turkmenhowayollary Agency | 4 | — | | | | |
| December 21, 2012 | Unidentified Customer(s) | 542 | 12 | | | | |
| July 12, 2012 | United Airlines | 510 | 300 | | | | |
| April 7, 2018 | UTair Aviation | 28 | — | | | | |
| May 22, 2016 | VietJet Air (Note: Including VietJet Air Thailand and Qazaqstan subsidiaries.) | 200 | 20 | | | | |
| July 6, 2012 | Virgin Australia | 25 | 15 | | | | |
| June 18, 2019 | Vueling | 60 | — | | | | |
| September 26, 2013 | WestJet | 132 | 39 | | | | |
| December 21, 2013 | XiamenAir | 28 | 28 | | | | |
| Total | | 7,350 | 2,483 | | | | |

=== Orders and deliveries graph ===
The following graph shows total firm orders and deliveries of Boeing 737 MAX aircraft as of September 30, 2026.

== See also ==
- Competition between Airbus and Boeing

Related development

- Boeing 737 Next Generation orders

Related lists

- List of Airbus A320neo family orders and deliveries
- List of Airbus A220 orders and deliveries
- List of Boeing 737 operators
