= TGFA =

TGFA may refer to:

- Tanzania Government Flight Agency, an executive agency of Tanzania that provides VIP flight service
- TGF alpha, a human protein
