= List of Airbus A220 operators =

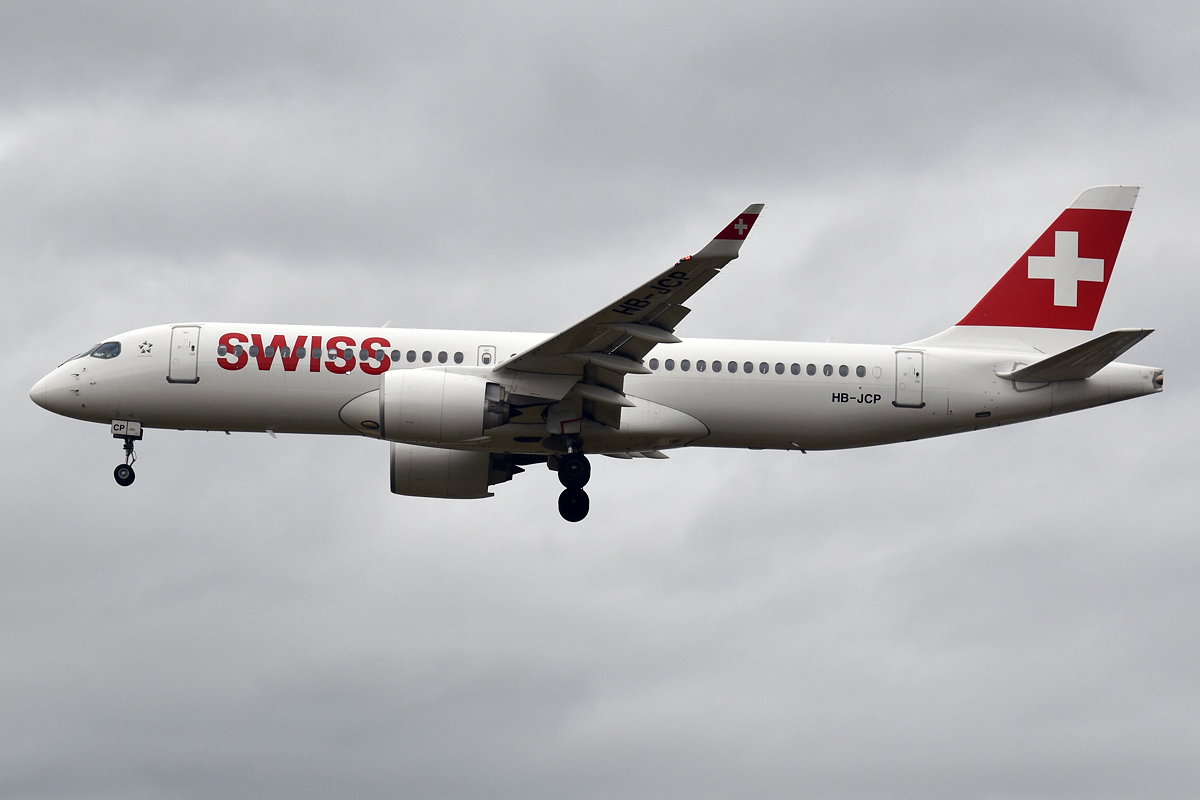
Swiss International Air Lines is the launch operator of the A220.

The following is a list of current operators of the Airbus A220 family aircraft in production by Airbus Canada Limited Partnership (ACLP), a joint venture between Airbus and Investissement Québec.

== Summary ==
As of October 2026, there are 555 A220 family aircraft in service with 21 commercial operators amongst other undisclosed operators. The five largest A220 operators are Delta Air Lines (96), JetBlue (70), Breeze Airways (67), Air France (59) and airBaltic (54).

== Current operators ==
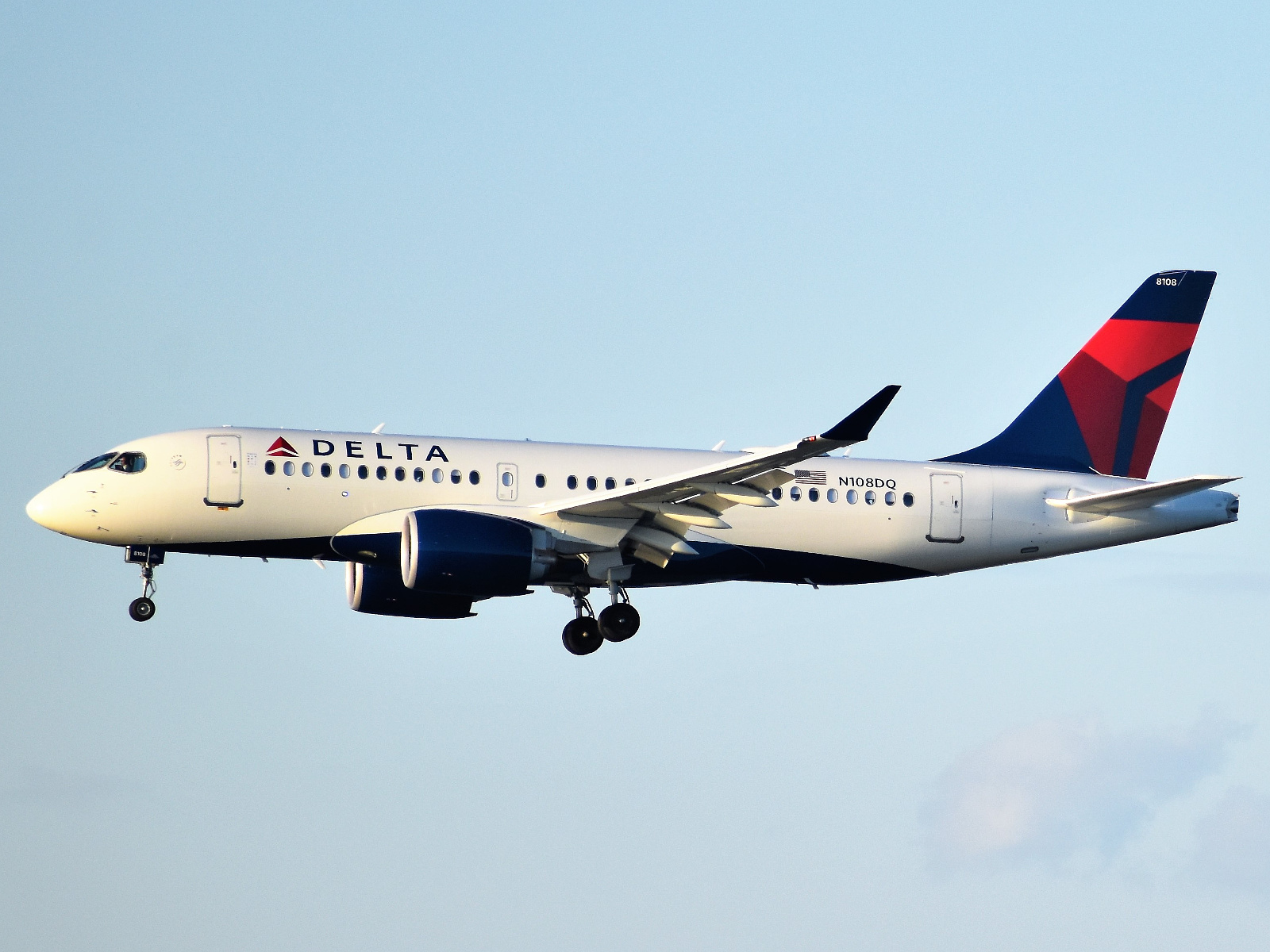
Delta Air Lines is the largest operator of the A220.

A220 family aircraft operators
Operator	First commercial service	A220-100	A220-300	A220 fleet
(France) Air Austral	18 August 2021	-	3	3
(Latvia) airBaltic	14 December 2016	-	54	54
Air Canada	16 January 2020	-	50	50
Air France	31 October 2021	-	59	59
(Papua New Guinea) Air Niugini	4 October 2025	-	3	3
Air Tanzania	7 January 2019	-	4	4
(Romania) Animawings	27 December 2024	-	6	6
(United States) Breeze Airways	25 May 2022	-	67	67
Bulgaria Air	17 July 2023	2	5	7
Croatia Airlines	6 August 2024	2	11	13
Cyprus Airways	9 August 2023	-	4	4
(United States) Delta Air Lines	7 February 2019	45	51	96
(Nigeria) Ibom Air	29 April 2024	-	3	3
(Iraq) Iraqi Airways	6 November 2022	-	5	5
(Italy) ITA Airways	16 October 2022	12	19	31
(United States) JetBlue	28 April 2021	-	70	70
(South Korea) Korean Air	20 January 2018	-	10	10
(Australia) QantasLink	1 March 2024	-	15	15
(Czech Republic) Smartwings/Czech Airlines	25 November 2024	-	4	4
(Switzerland) Swiss	15 June 2016	9	21	30
TAAG Angola	11 November 2024	-	7	7
Governments, executive and private jets		4	-	4
Undisclosed		1	11	12
Total		75	480	555

== Former operators ==
- Air Manas ceased operations in 2022.
- Air Sinai operated two A220-300s of EgyptAir between December 2019 and May 2021, and then begun flying for Nigeria's Ibom Air.
- Air Senegal retired its sole A220 in 2022.
- EgyptAir retired its A220 fleet in 2024.

== See also ==
- List of Embraer E-Jet operators
- List of Airbus A320 family operators
- List of Boeing 737 operators
- List of Airbus A220 orders
