= List of Boeing 737 operators =

The following is a list of Boeing 737 operators, excluding former operators.

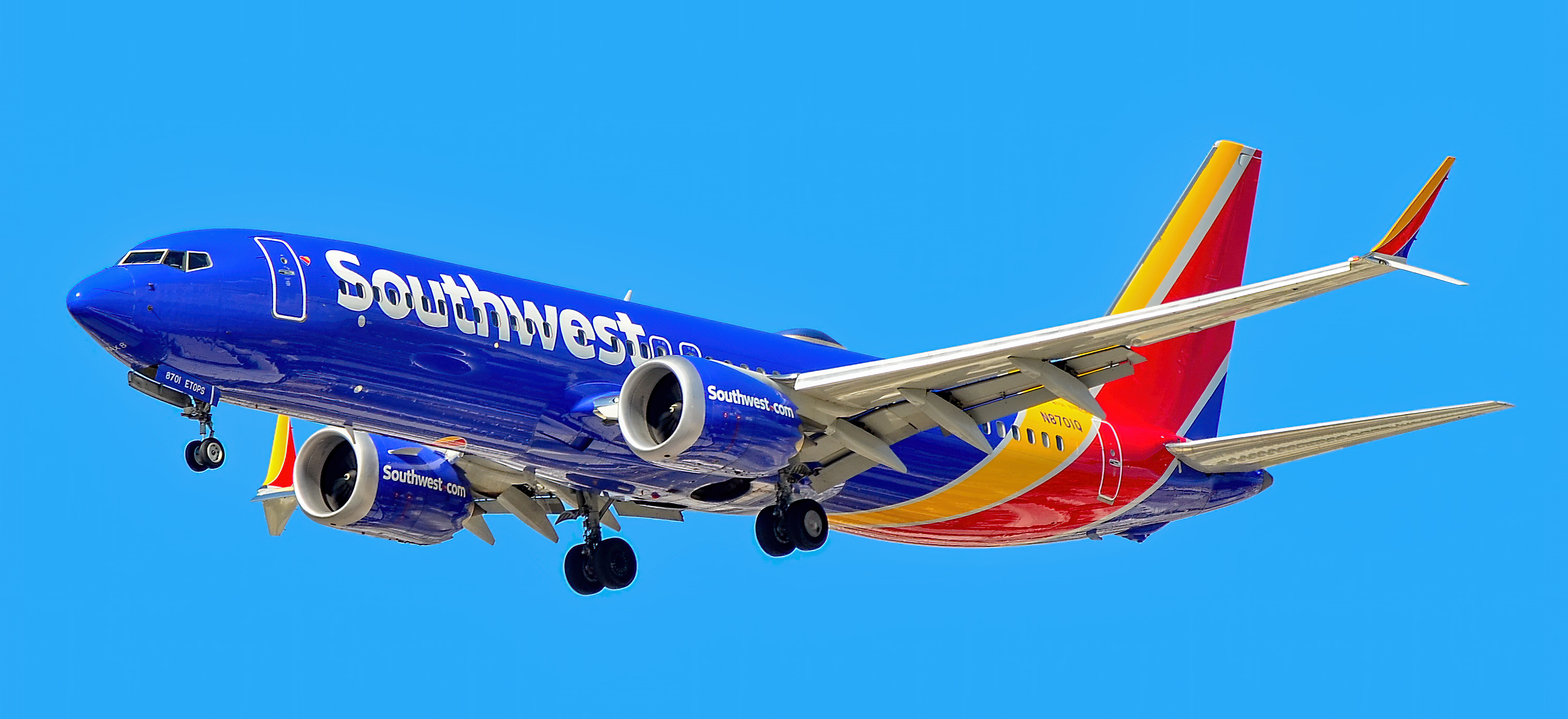
Southwest Airlines is the largest Boeing 737 operator

== Civil operators by country ==
The table shows only civil operators with more than 50 Boeing 737:

Airline	Country	Original		Classic			Next Generation				MAX					Total in service
Airline	Country	100	200	300	400	500	600	700	800	900	MAX 7	MAX 8	MAX 8-200	MAX 9	MAX 10	Total in service
Qantas	Australia								75							75
Virgin Australia	Australia							9	79			8				96
Gol Transportes Aéreos	Brazil							12	66			59				137
WestJet	Canada							36	55			55				146
Air China	China							17	87			31				135
China Eastern Airlines	China							37	102			3				142
China Southern Airlines	China							18	85			28				131
China United Airlines	China							5	55							60
Hainan Airlines	China								135			14				149
Shandong Airlines	China							3	123			12				138
Shanghai Airlines	China							4	57			17				78
Shenzhen Airlines	China								71			13				84
XiamenAir	China							5	115			22				142
Transavia France	France								68							68
Air India Express	India								26			42				68
Lion Air	Indonesia								23	59				4		86
Ryanair (Note: Ryanair Holdings incl. Ryanair DAC, Ryanair UK, Malta Air, Buzz and Lauda Europe)	Ireland								409				206			615
Malaysia Airlines	Malaysia								40			14				54
Aeroméxico	Mexico								34			45		29		108
Norwegian Air Shuttle	Norway								61			34				95
Copa Airlines	Panama							9	69			15		32		125
AJet	Turkey								44			25				69
SunExpress	Turkey								55			15				70
Turkish Airlines	Turkey								69	15		27		5		116
flydubai	United Arab Emirates								26			67		3		96
Jet2.com	United Kingdom			7					93							100
Tui Airways	United Kingdom								32			23				55
Alaska Airlines	United States							11	59	79		14		80		243
American Airlines	United States								303			89				392
Delta Air Lines	United States								77	163						240
Southwest Airlines	United States							305	198			300				803
Sun Country Airlines	United States								58	5						63
United Airlines	United States							40	141	148		123		120		572

== Military operators ==
Many countries operate the 737 passenger, BBJ and cargo variants in government or military applications. Users with 737s include:

Country	Units	Operator
Argentina	2	Argentinian Air Force has one 737-500 and one 737-700NG.
Australia	22	Royal Australian Air Force uses two 737-8 BBJ VIP transports, six 737 AEW&C Wedgetails, and 14 P-8A Poseidons.
Chile	2	Chilean Air Force has one 737-300, and one 737-500.
China	13	People's Liberation Army Air Force has eight 737-300, two 737-700 and five 737-800.
Colombia	1	Colombian Aerospace Force has one 737- 700.
India	18	Indian Air Force operates three 737-200, and three 737-700 BBJ aircraft and Indian Navy operates 12 P-8I.
Indonesia	11	Indonesian Air Force operates three 737-2X9 Surveiller MPA, one 737-200Adv, three 737-400, one 737-500, two 737-800NG and one 737-800 (BBJ) aircraft.
Kazakhstan	1	Armed Forces of the Republic of Kazakhstan operates a single 737-700 BBJ.
Mexico	2	Mexican Air Force has one 737-200Adv, and one 737-300F.
Niger	1	Niger Air Force has one 737-700.
Norway	3	Royal Norwegian Air Force has three 737-800.
Peru	4	Peruvian Air Force has three 737-200 and one 737-500 aircraft.
Poland	3	Polish Air Force has one 737-800 and two 737 BBJ2s.
Saudi Arabia	3	Royal Saudi Air Force has two 737-700 BBJ, and one 737-800 aircraft.
South Africa	1	South African Air Force have one 737-700WL BBJ.
South Korea	5	Republic of Korea Air Force uses four 737 AEW&C Peaceeye and one 737-300 jet.
Taiwan	1	Taiwanese Air Force operates one 737-800, is the Presidential Administrative Aircraft of the Republic of China.
Thailand	4	Royal Thai Air Force for Thai Royal Family. One 737-2Z6 (designated B.L.11 (Thai: บ.ล.๑๑)), two 737-4Z6 (designated B.L.11B (Thai: บ.ล.๑๑ข)), and one 737-8Z6 (designated B.L.11C (Thai: บ.ล.๑๑ค)). The RTAF has also operated the 737-3Z6 under the designation B.L.11A (Thai: บ.ล.๑๑ก).
Turkey	4	Turkish Air Force uses four Boeing 737-700IGW jets.
United Kingdom	9	Royal Air Force uses nine Poseidon MRA1.
United States	156	United States Air Force uses 10 Boeing C-40 Clipper (four C-40B and six C-40C) transports, and United States Navy uses 17 C-40As , and ~129 P-8A Poseidon.
Venezuela	1	Venezuelan Air Force operates one 737- 200.

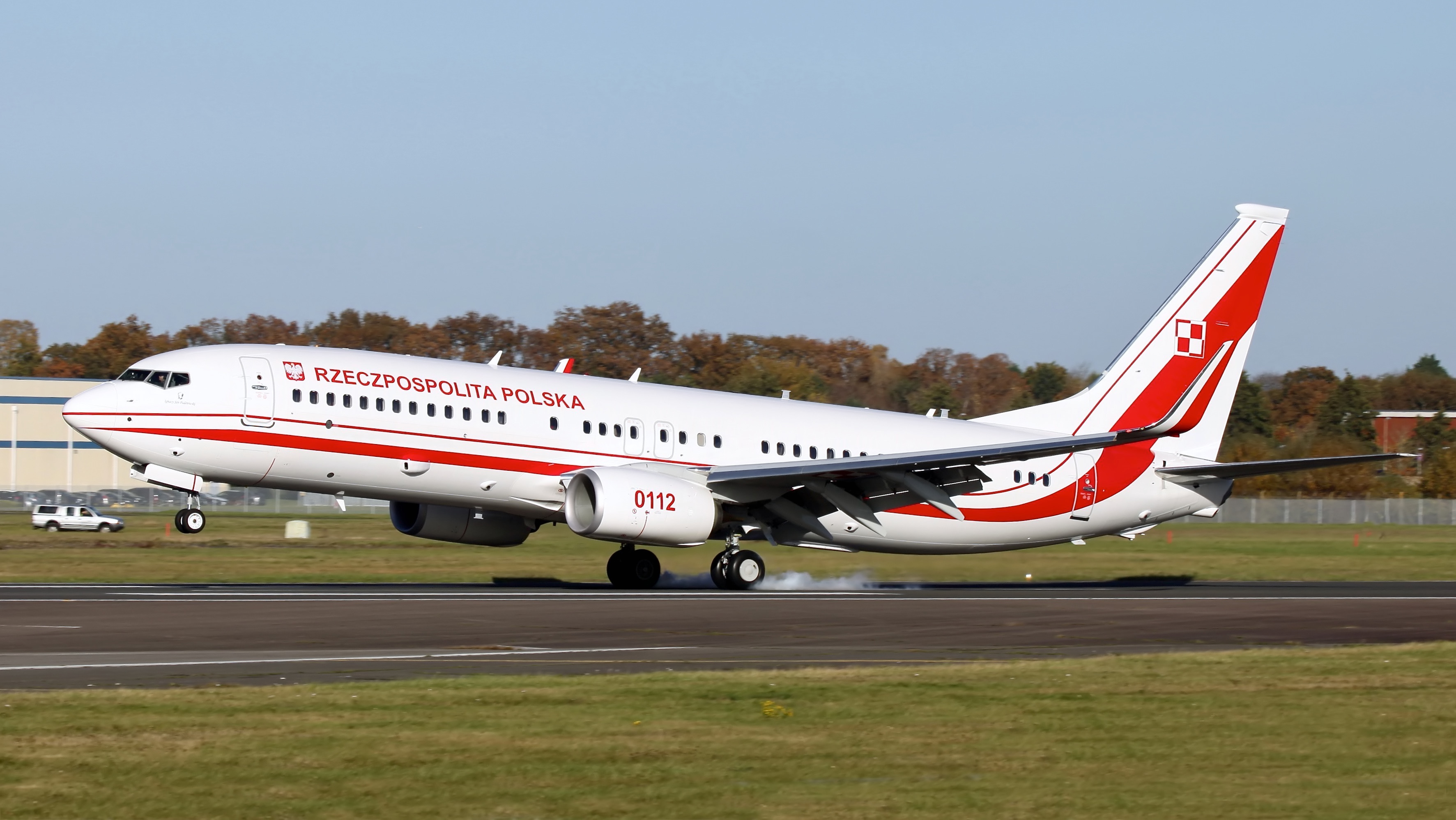
Polish Air Force 737 BBJ2

== See also ==
- Boeing 737
- List of Boeing 737 MAX orders
- List of Airbus A320 family operators
- List of Airbus A220 operators
