= List of Embraer E-Jet operators =

The following is a list of current and former operators of the Embraer E-Jet family:

== Civil operators ==
Legend	Notes
*	Current
*	Former
	Orders

Airline	Country / Region	E170	E175	E190	E195	E175-E2	E190-E2	E195-E2	Total in service	Notes
Aerolíneas Argentinas	Argentina			24				12*	24	12 E195-E2 on order. *Order suspended in 2025.
Aeromexico Connect	Mexico	13	3	34					34	
Air Astana	Kazakhstan			9			5			Phased out
Air Botswana	Botswana	1							1	Former Flybe E170
Air Burkina	Burkina Faso	2	1		2				2	
Air Cairo	Egypt			3					3	
Air Canada	Canada		15	45						Launch customer of the E175. Phased out
Air Côte d’Ivoire	Ivory Coast		4							4 E175 on order
Air Dolomiti	Italy			9	17				26	
Air Europa Express	Spain				11					
Air France Hop	France	10		23					33	
Air Kiribati	Kiribati						1			2 E190-E2 on order
Airlink	South Africa	2	4	28	6			10	40	A total of 10 E195-E2 will be leased from Azorra Aviation
Airnorth	Australia	3		5					8	
Air Moldova	Moldova			3						Phased out
Air Montenegro	Montenegro				3				3	
Air Peace	Nigeria		2	1				5	6	2 E175; 11 E195-E2 on order
Air Serbia	Serbia			4					4	
Alitalia CityLiner	Italy		10	5						Ceased operations in 2021
Alliance Airlines	Australia			45					45	
All Nippon Airways	Japan						15			15 E190-E2 on order. Deliveries begin in 2028
Amaszonas	Bolivia			6						Ceased operations in 2023
Amaszonas Uruguay	Uruguay			1						Ceased operations in 2021
American Airlines	United States			20						Phased out
Arkia	Israel			3	3				3	
Aurigny	Guernsey				1					Ceased operating the type in 2024 as a part of fleet streamlining
Austral Líneas Aéreas	Argentina			26						Ceased operations in 2020 Transferred to Aerolíneas Argentinas
Austrian Airlines	Austria				17				17	
Avianca El Salvador	El Salvador			12						TACA Airlines until 2013
Avelo Airlines	United States							50		50 firm E195-E2 and 50 options, total up to 100 E195-E2
Azerbaijan Airlines	Azerbaijan	1		7					7	
Azul Brazilian Airlines	Brazil		5	22	34			35	69	Launch customer of the E195-E2. 25 E195-E2 on order
BA CityFlyer	United Kingdom	6		20					20	
ASL Airlines Australia	Australia						1			Phased out
Bamboo Airways	Vietnam			1	4					E195 leased from LOT Polish Airlines and Great Dane Airlines
Belavia	Belarus		1		4			3	5	
BermudAir	Bermuda		2	2					4	Leased from Azorra Aviation
Bestfly Cabo Verde	Cape Verde			1						Ceased operations in 2024
Binter	Spain			1				16	16	
Breeze Airways	United States			10	7					Phased out
Bulgaria Air	Bulgaria			4						Phased out
Buta Airways	Azerbaijan	1		8						Ceased operations in 2023
Caribbean Airlines	Jamaica; Trinidad and Tobago		5							A total of 5 E175 will be leased. Deliveries begin in 2026
China Southern Airlines	China			20						Phased out
Colorful Guizhou Airlines	China			9					9	
CommuteAir	United States	1								Phased out
Compass Airlines	United States	6	56							Ceased operations in 2020; Leased from American Airlines and Delta Air Lines
Conviasa	Venezuela			15					15	
Copa Airlines	Panama			15						Phased out
Copa Airlines Colombia	Colombia			17						Aero República until 2010
Eastern Airways	United Kingdom	1		4						Ceased operations in 2025
Envoy Air	United States	43	137						180	Operating for American Eagle. 33 E175 on order.
Fastjet Tanzania	Tanzania			2					2	
Finnair	Finland	10		12				18	12	18 E195-E2 firm orders and 16 options. Operated by Nordic Regional Airlines
Flybe	United Kingdom		11		14					Launch customer of the E195. Ceased operations in 2020
Fuji Dream Airlines	Japan	2	13						15	
Georgian Airways	Georgia			3	1					Phased out
German Airways	Germany			9						
Great Dane Airlines	Denmark				3					Ceased operations in 2021
GX Airlines	China			7					7	
Hebei Airlines	China			6						Phased out
Helvetic Airways	Switzerland			6	4		8	4	22	3 E195-E2 on order
Horizon Air	United States		47						47	Operating for Alaska Horizon. 3 E175 on order.
Hunnu Air	Mongolia			2			2		4	A total of 2 E190-E2 will be leased from Azorra Aviation.
Ikar	Russia			4					4	Was named "Pegas Fly" until 2022. No longer supported by Embraer as an effect of the 2022 Russian invasion of Ukraine
ITA Airways	Italy			2						Phased out. Wet-lease partnership with German Airways
J-Air	Japan	18		14					32	
Jazz Aviation	Canada		25						25	Transferred from Sky Regional Airlines after consolidation with Jazz Aviation in 2021. Operating for Air Canada Express.
JetBlue	United States			63						Launch customer of the E190. All retired in 2025.
Kalstar Aviation	Indonesia			1	2					Ceased operations in 2017
Kenya Airways	Kenya	5		15					15	
KLM Cityhopper	Netherlands	1	17	25				24	66	2 E195-E2 on order
LAM Mozambique Airlines	Mozambique			2					2	
LATAM Airlines Brasil	Brazil							24		24 E195-E2 on order
LOT Polish Airlines	Poland	4	13	8	15			3	43	Launch customer of the E170. All to be retired by 2027, replaced by the Airbus A220.
Lufthansa CityLine	Germany			9	24					Transferred to Air Dolomiti and Austrian Airlines
Lumiwings	Greece				1					Ceased operations in 2025
Luxair	Luxembourg							4	4	2 E195-E2 on order
Mandarin Airlines	Taiwan			8						Phased out
Marathon Airlines	Greece		1	1	1					Phased out
Mauritania Airlines	Mauritania		2						2	
Mesa Airlines	United States		60						60	Operating for United Express
Mexicana de Aviacón	Mexico						10	5	5	10 E190-E2; 10 E195-E2 on order
Montenegro Airlines	Montenegro			1	3					Ceased operations in 2020
Myanmar National Airlines	Myanmar			2						Phased out
Myanmar Airways International	Myanmar			1					1	
National Jet Express	Australia			8					8	
Oman Air	Oman		5							Phased out
Overland Airways	Nigeria		2						2	1 E175 on order
People's	Austria	1							1	Former Finnair E170
Petro Air	Libya	1							1	
Placar Linhas Aéreas	Brazil						1		1	
Porter Airlines	Canada							52	52	First North American airline to operate E2 family. 23 E195-E2 on order.
Republic Airways	United States	23	178	17					201	Operating for American Eagle, Delta Connection, and United Express. 14 E175 on order.
Royal Air Maroc	Morocco			4					4	
Royal Jordanian	Jordan		2		1		4	4	8	
S7 Airlines	Russia	17							17	No longer supported by Embraer as an effect of the 2022 Russian invasion of Ukraine
SalamAir	Oman							6		6 E195-E2 on order
SAS Link	Sweden				15			45	15	45 E195-E2 on order
SATENA	Colombia	1								
Scoot	Singapore						6		6	6 E190-E2 leased from Azorra Aviation
SKYhigh	Dominican Republic	2		5					5	
Sky Regional Airlines	Canada		25							Ceased operations in 2021. Leased from and operated for Air Canada Express.
SkyWest Airlines	United States		263						263	Operating for Alaska SkyWest, American Eagle, Delta Connection, and United Express. 75 E175 on order.
Star Air	India		6						6	A total of 8 E175 will be leased from Azorra Aviation
Stobart Air	Ireland			2	3					Ceased operations in 2021.
TACA Costa Rica	Costa Rica			4						Phased out
TAME	Ecuador	2		5						Ceased Operations in 2020.
TAP Express	Portugal			12	7				19	Portugália Airlines until 2016
Tianjin Airlines	China			38	17				55	
Titan Airways	United Kingdom			1					1	
TRIP Linhas Aéreas	Brazil		9	10						Merged with Azul Brazilian Airlines in 2014
TrueNoord	Netherlands							20		20 E195-E2 on order.
TUI fly Belgium	Belgium			4				3	3	Jetairfly until 2016
Ukraine International Airlines	Ukraine			4	1				5	
Urumqi Air	China			1						
US Airways	United States			20						Merged with American Airlines in 2015
Virgin Australia	Australia	4		18						Phased out
Virgin Australia Regional Airlines	Australia							4		4 E190-E2 on order
WDL Aviation	Germany			5						Ceased operations in 2020
Widerøe	Norway						3		3	Launch customer of the E190-E2

== State and corporate operators ==
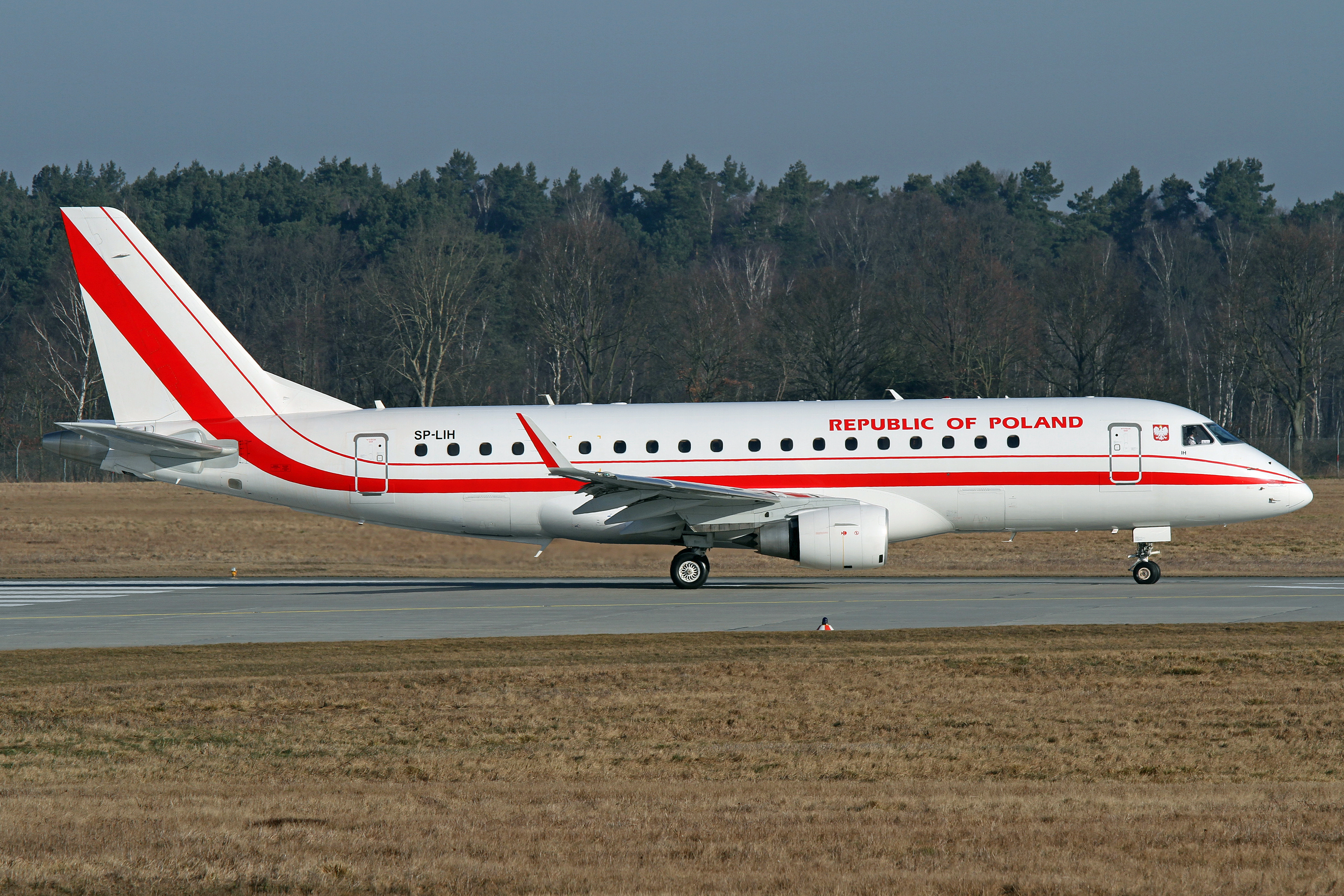
An Embraer E175 operated for the Government of Poland.

Libya

- Sirte Oil Company (Embraer 170/175)

Montenegro

- Government of Montenegro (Embraer 195 - stored)

Poland

- Ministry of Defence (2) - leased from LOT Polish Airlines (Embraer 170/175)
