= Nordic Aviation Capital =

Aircraft lessor

- Company type: Private
- Industry: Aircraft leasing
- Founded: 1990
- Headquarters: Ireland
- Number of locations: 5
- Area served: Worldwide
- Key people: Norman C.T. Liu (President & CEO)
- Website: www.nac.dk

Nordic Aviation Capital (NAC) was the world leader in regional aircraft leasing and expanded into larger narrow body aircraft as well. NAC was headquartered in Ireland, with offices in Singapore, Denmark, Dubai and Toronto. It had over 60 customers in over 40 countries. The firm was merged with Dubai Aerospace in May 2025.

== History ==
NAC was founded on October 15, 1990, in Denmark, focusing on turboprop leasing for its first 25 years.

From 2015 to 2020, it doubled its fleet principally by expanding into regional jets. By January 2020, the Company moved to a new headquarters in Ireland and its fleet value peaked at about $7 billion, with over 500 aircraft owned, managed, and committed. At this point, NAC was by far the world’s largest regional aircraft lessor.

Due to the COVID-19 pandemic, lack of adequate equity and substantial portfolio issues, NAC underwent a major financial restructuring commencing in December 2021 with a chapter 11 filing. Norman Liu, a longtime aviation finance executive, had been named CEO previously in October 2021 to lead the firm through this process. A completely new senior management team, ownership group and Board of Directors were subsequently established.

NAC emerged during June 2022 with a much improved balance sheet and financial position of over $500 million of liquidity and growth capital. The fleet total was over 370 aircraft owned, managed and on order, with assets of over $3 billion but significant debt remained. Over the next few years, the fleet quality was transformed and substantial debt was repaid from aircraft sales and debt buybacks, which enabled NAC to be successfully merged into Dubai Aerospace in May 2025.

== Franchise ==
NAC was for a time the only lessor with both orders for new ATR turboprops and Airbus A220 cross-over jets. NAC also expanded into larger narrow body aircraft such as Boeing 737 and Airbus A320 family members to improve its fleet quality.

== Ownership ==
NAC was owned by a diversified group of institutional investors including leading insurance companies, asset managers and other financial institutions.

== Fleet ==
As of December 31, 2022 the Nordic Aviation Capital fleet consisted of the following aircraft:

Nordic Aviation Capital fleet
Aircraft	Owned	Committed	Total
ATR 42/72	131	17	148
E-Jet	116	-	116
Q400	68	-	68
A220	-	20	20
A320/321ceo	-	-	-
A320/321neo	-	4	4
737NG	-	3	3
Total	315	44	359

From 2022 to 2025, NAC sharply reduced its mature aircraft assets like E1s and Q400s, while adding to its ATR/ A320/737 family fleet. It also converted its A220 order stream to a mix of A220s and more liquid A321neos.The significant improvement in the fleet quality and substantial debt reduction from asset sales enabled NAC to successfully be acquired in May 2025.
