= Great Dane Airlines =

Danish airline

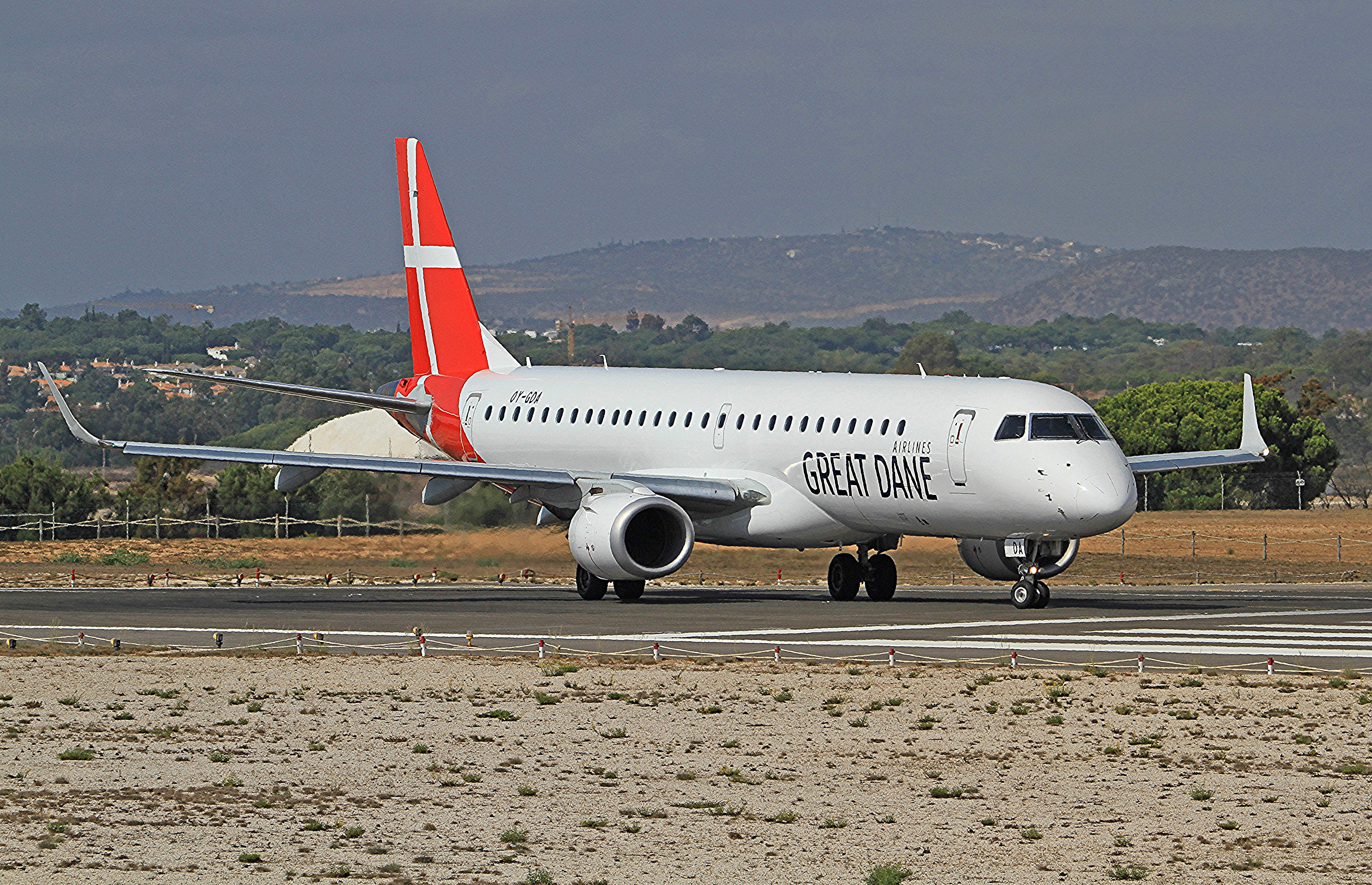
- Embraer 195
| IATA | ICAO | Call sign |
|---|---|---|
| DW | GDE | GREAT DANE |
- Founded: 2018
- Commenced operations: 21 June 2019
- Ceased operations: 11 October 2021
- Operating bases: Aalborg Airport
- Fleet size: 3
- Destinations: 16
- Headquarters: Aalborg, Denmark
- Key people: Thomas Hugo Møller (founder); Eigild Bødker Christensen (owner)
- Website: greatdaneairlines.dk

Great Dane Airlines A/S was a Danish airline based in Aalborg, Denmark. Founded in 2018, the airline launched operations with its first chartered and scheduled flights in June 2019. Great Dane Airlines ceased operations on 11 October 2021, when the airline filed for bankruptcy.

== History ==
Established in 2018, the airline offered charter flights for a range of Danish tour operators, initially with fleet of two 118-seat Embraer 195 aircraft bought from Stobart Air, staffed by eight pilots and twelve cabin crew. The airline operated its maiden flight on 14 June 2019, which was a charter flight from Aalborg to Rhodes, while its first scheduled flight was from Aalborg to Dublin on 21 June 2019.

The airline was initially co-owned by Thomas Hugo Møller and by Huy Duc Nguyen, who resigned from his position as a board member, executive and owner in March 2019 after a newspaper revealed exaggerations in his résumé. In March 2019, Eigild Bødker Christensen invested in Great Dane Airlines (via SEBC II ApS), leaving Great Dane Airlines co-owned by Thomas Hugo Møller (10%) and Eigild Bødker Christensen (90%).

Between September 2020 and May 2021, the airline wet-leased two of its aircraft to startup airline Bamboo Airways.

On 11 October 2021, Great Dane Airlines filed for bankruptcy and ceased operations.

== Destinations ==
Great Dane Airlines operated charter flights to the following destinations:

| Country | City | Airport | Notes | Refs |
|---|---|---|---|---|
| Croatia | Split | Split Airport | Seasonal charter | |
| Croatia | Rijeka | Rijeka Airport | Seasonal charter | |
| Croatia | Zadar | Zadar Airport | Seasonal charter | |
| Denmark | Aalborg | Aalborg Airport | Base | |
| Greece | Crete | Chania International Airport | Seasonal charter | |
| Greece | Rhodes | Rhodes International Airport | Seasonal charter | |
| Greece | Preveza | Preveza Airport | Seasonal charter | |
| Ireland | Dublin | Dublin Airport | Seasonal charter | |
| Italy | Bologna | Bologna International Airport | Seasonal charter | |
| Italy | Naples | Naples International Airport | Seasonal charter | |
| Norway | Lakselv | Lakselv Airport | Seasonal charter | |
| Portugal | Madeira | Funchal Airport | Seasonal charter | |
| Portugal | Lisbon | Lisbon International Airport | Seasonal charter | |
| Spain | Palma de Mallorca | Palma de Mallorca Airport | Seasonal charter | |
| Turkey | Alanya | Gazipaşa Airport | Seasonal charter | |
| United Kingdom | Edinburgh | Edinburgh Airport | Seasonal charter | |

== Fleet ==
At the time of shutdown in October 2021, Great Dane Airlines operated the following aircraft:

Great Dane Airlines fleet
| Aircraft | In service | Orders | Passengers | Notes |
|---|---|---|---|---|
| Embraer 195 | 3 | — | 118 | |
| Total | 3 | — | | |
