= Avolon =

Aircraft leasing company

Avolon Aerospace Leasing Limited
- Industry: Aircraft leasing
- Founded: 2010; 16 years ago
- Headquarters: Dublin, Ireland (operational headquarters); George Town, Cayman Islands (registered office)
- Owner: Bohai Leasing (70%); Orix (30%)
- Website: www.avolon.aero

Avolon is an aircraft leasing company based in Dublin, Ireland. It was founded in May 2010 by Dómhnal Slattery and a team from RBS Aviation Capital. The company's registered headquarters are based in George Town, Cayman Islands.

In December 2014, Avolon went public on the New York Stock Exchange (NYSE) with the ticker symbol AVOL, marking the largest listing of an Irish-founded company on the NYSE. The following year, Avolon received a cash offer from Bohai Leasing Co., an affiliated Chinese leasing and financial services company, to acquire 100% of Avolon's common shares. The acquisition by Bohai Leasing was completed in January 2016, leading to Avolon's delisting from the NYSE.

In November 2018, Orix, a Japanese financial institution, acquired a 30% stake in Avolon from its shareholder, Bohai Capital, which is part of the HNA Group. Avolon historically made headlines by placing the world's largest order for eVTOL aircraft.

In October 2022, Dómhnal Slattery, the founding CEO of Avolon, retired, and Andy Cronin, the founding CFO, succeeded him in the position.

== History ==
=== Founding and Early Expansion ===
Avolon was established in May 2010 by Dómhnal Slattery and a team from RBS Aviation Capital including John Higgins, Tom Ashe, Andy Cronin, Simon Hanson, and Ed Riley. and received the 'Equity Deal of the Year' award from Airfinance Journal in 2011. In January 2013, Avolon announced a joint-venture aircraft leasing business with Wells Fargo. This partnership, known as Avolon Capital Partners (ACP), received regulatory approval in July 2013 and delivered its first aircraft, a Boeing 737-800 NG leased to Ryanair, in August of the same year.

In mid-2013, Avolon expressed support for changes in Irish legislation that aligned with the Cape Town Convention's Alternative A insolvency regime, enhancing protections for aircraft financing. That same year, the company initiated and completed a major asset-backed securitization through its subsidiary, Emerald Aviation Finance. In September, Avolon announced the pricing and issuance of US $636 million in fixed-rate asset-backed notes, followed by the successful closing and funding of the transaction in October. The proceeds were used to acquire and refinance a fleet of 20 aircraft, with all modifications completed within 60 days.

In November 2013, Avolon expanded its industry engagement by publishing a white paper titled Funding the Future: Matching the Demand for Aircraft with the Supply of Capital, which examined the long-term financing needs for global aircraft deliveries. The same month they also commissioned a documentary, Pioneers and Aviators: A Century of Irish Aviation, highlighting key developments in Irish aviation history and the contributions of influential figures in the sector.

=== Public Offering and Acquisition ===
As of December 2014, Avolon completed its initial public offering and was listed on the New York Stock Exchange under the ticker symbol AVOL, becoming the largest-ever listing of an Irish-founded company on the NYSE. A few months later in March 2015, Avolon published an updated analysis on the key factors influencing the economic life of commercial jet aircraft, building on their previous analysis issued in September 2012.

In September 2015, Avolon announced that it had received a cash acquisition offer from Bohai Leasing Co., a Chinese financial services company affiliated with the HNA Group, to purchase 100% of Avolon's common shares at a price of US$31 per share. The offer was accepted and the acquisition was finalized in January 2016, resulting in Avolon's delisting from the New York Stock Exchange. As part of the transaction, Avolon also assumed control of Hong Kong Aviation Capital, another Bohai-owned leasing company.

=== Growth Through Acquisitions ===
In July 2016, Avolon announced the acquisition of a portfolio of 45 aircraft from another lessor, GECAS. This marked the company's largest portfolio acquisition to date. This expansion was followed by a strategic move in April 2017, when Avolon completed its acquisition of CIT Group's aircraft leasing business. The transaction created the third-largest aircraft leasing company globally, with a combined fleet of 850 aircraft valued over US$43 billion at the time.

In May 2017, Avolon delivered the world's first Boeing 737 MAX 8 aircraft to Malindo Air, a Malaysian airline. The following month, the company signed a Memorandum of Understanding with Boeing to purchase 75 additional 737 MAX 8 aircraft, with options for 50 more. This agreement brought Avolon's total fleet to over 900 aircraft.

=== Fleet Milestones and Financing ===
In September 2018, Avolon opened its new global headquarters at Number One Ballsbridge in Dublin, with the event officiated by Ireland's Taoisearch, Leo Varadkar. In November 2018, the Japanese financial services firm ORIX Corporation acquired a 30% stake in Avolon from its parent company, Bohair Capital.

November 2018 also marked an aviation milestone by delivering the world's first Airbus A330neo aircraft to TAP Air Portugal. This was followed in December 2018 by Avolon's largest-ever aircraft order, a purchase agreement for 100 Airbus A320neo family aircraft, with a list price valuation of US$11.5 billion.

In April 2019, Avolon raised an additional US$2.5 billion in unsecured debt, which contributed to the company securing an investment-grade credit rating from Fitch, Moody's and S&P Global. Two months later in June, Avolon announced an agreement with CFM International to purchase 140 LEAP-1A engines, valued at $2 billion at list prices. These engines were designated for 70 Airbus A320neo aircraft within Avolon's existing order book.

=== Diversification and Innovation ===
In June 2021, Avolon placed the world's largest order for electric vertical takeoff and landing aircraft at the time, committing to purchase 500 VX4 aircraft from Vertical Aerospace. Later that year in October, they announced a partnership with Israel Aerospace Industries (IAI) to develop and expand air cargo conversion capabilities, further diversifying its fleet and presence in the global air freight market.

Leadership changes followed in 2022, when Avolon's founding CEO, Dómhnal Slattery, retired. Andy Cronin, who had served as the founding CFO, was named his successor in July 2022 and officially assumed the role of Chief Execute Officer a few months later in October.

=== Recent Developments ===
As of September 30, 2023, Avolon had an owned, managed, and committed fleet totaling 897 aircraft, maintaining its position as one of the world's largest aircraft lessors.

In May 2025, Avolon delivered the first of eight Airbus A320neo aircraft to Royal Jordanian Airlines.

== eVTOL order ==
In June 2021, Avolon made an investment in the eVTOL company Vertical Aerospace. Vertical Aerospace announced its intention to list on the Stock Exchange through a SPAC transaction, and they received orders for 1,000 eVTOLs from various companies, including American Airlines, Virgin Atlantic, and Avolon. Avolon placed the single largest order for eVTOLs globally, consisting of 500 Vertical VX4 aircraft. As of March 2022, Avolon had successfully allocated its order to airlines.

Avolon has formed partnerships with GOL in Brazil, JAL in Japan, Gozen Holding in Turkey, Air Asia in Malaysia, and Air Greenland to establish eVTOL ride-sharing businesses utilizing the Vertical VX4 aircraft.

== Aircraft leasing in Ireland ==
As of 2013, Ireland had established itself as a prominent jurisdiction for aircraft finance and leasing, according to law firm Dillon Eustace. The origins of the Irish industry can be traced back to the establishment of Guinness Peat Aviation in Shannon, County Clare, in 1975. A survey conducted by the Federation of Aerospace Enterprises in Ireland estimated that aviation leasing companies in Ireland managed assets valued at approximately €82.9 billion in 2013.

The financing of aircraft requires a substantial amount of capital, with an estimated annual need exceeding US$100 billion to cover all aircraft deliveries. Aircraft leasing has gained prominence and now accounts for about 40% of the global aircraft financing market. This growth is attributed to airlines recognizing the advantages of leasing, which offers greater flexibility in managing their aircraft fleets. Some lessors anticipated that the proportion of leased aircraft in the global fleet would increase to as much as 50% in the years following 2012.

== Publications ==
In April 2019, Avolon released a white paper titled "Project I: Positioning Ireland at the Forefront of Global Startup Innovation." The paper assessed Ireland's start-up ecosystem in comparison to global best practices and offered recommendations to enhance Ireland's global standing and support entrepreneurs.

In July 2018, Avolon published a white paper titled "India, a 21st Century Powerhouse." The paper provided a comprehensive analysis of India's air travel market, covering factors impacting the commercial airline sector and an in-depth breakdown of passenger markets, airline fleets, and future growth projections. The paper projected that India's passenger fleet would nearly double to around 1,100 aircraft by 2027, with a total value of delivered aircraft estimated at $60 billion over the next decade at current list prices. The analysis also highlighted a shortfall of 300 aircraft in India's commercial aviation order book to meet the anticipated growth in demand. The demand was driven primarily by forecasted annual growth rates of 9.6% for domestic passenger demand and 8.3% for international passenger demand.

In the first half of 2017, Avolon published a white paper series titled "The Land of Silk and Money," focusing on the Chinese aviation market. The series analyzed the development, growth, and maturation of China's domestic airline industry, as well as the inbound and outbound travel markets. The analysis indicated that Chinese airlines would require an additional 3,200 aircraft by 2026 to meet future fleet requirements. At the time, more than 50% of these aircraft remained to be ordered, including 1,150 narrow-bodied aircraft, 400 wide-bodied aircraft, and 150 regional jets.

In September 2012, Avolon released an analysis of commercial aircraft's economic lives and retirement patterns. The analysis aimed to evaluate the validity of current assumptions regarding the economic life of commercial jets, which are typically depreciated over a useful life of approximately 25 years. This analysis was particularly relevant as a significant number of aircraft, around 8,000, were expected to be retired over the next decade, surpassing the total number of retirements since the inception of commercial aviation in the 1960s. The Avolon analysis examined changes in retirement trends over time, differences in retirement behavior among specific aircraft types, and the potential impact on retirement trends and aircraft economic values due to the retirement of newer fleets, including the Airbus A320 and Boeing 737NG aircraft.

In February 2013, Avolon published an analysis and investor guide on the anticipated market impact of the transition to new-generation Airbus (320Neo) and Boeing (737MAX) single-aisle aircraft families. The analysis explored how the transition from previous-generation A320ceo and 737NG aircraft to A320Neo and 737MAX models would influence the single-aisle aircraft market in the coming years. The study indicated that the value impact on predecessor models would be limited due to the substantial number of current-generation aircraft in use and the high proportion of the global fleet approaching retirement. The authors predicted that rising passenger numbers in developing countries would drive demand for both the Neo and MAX models, as well as for current-generation aircraft, as airlines sought to increase capacity while facing long waiting lists for the new models. The strong order backlogs of Airbus and Boeing also made the second-hand market an appealing option for fast-growing carriers.

In March 2015, Avolon released an updated analysis of the key factors influencing the economic life of commercial jet aircraft, building upon the previous analysis issued in September 2012. The 2015 analysis also addressed aircraft retirement and storage trends. The paper concluded that retirement patterns had not significantly changed since 2012, with the average retirement age remaining around 25 years and more than 50% of fleets staying in service beyond that point.

== Documentary on Irish Aviation: 'Pioneers and Aviators' ==
In November 2013, Avolon announced the commissioning of a documentary titled "Pioneers and Aviators: A Century of Irish Aviation," which explores the history of Irish aviation. The documentary highlights the achievements and challenges of pioneering individuals who played a significant role in shaping Ireland's aviation landscape. It covers various milestones such as the first transatlantic flight by Alcock and Brown, the evolution of Aer Lingus, the development of airports at Foynes, Shannon, and Dublin, the contributions of Tony Ryan, the rise and fall of GPA, and the enduring influence of Ryanair. The documentary was directed by Alan Gilsenan, an accomplished filmmaker, writer, and theater director, with the score composed by Mícheál Ó Súilleabháin in collaboration with the RTÉ Concert Orchestra.

The premiere of the documentary took place at the Irish National Concert Hall in Dublin on January 22, 2014. It was later broadcast in two episodes on RTÉ Television on February 20 and 27, 2014.

In June 2015, Avolon launched a commemorative photographic book bearing the same title, "Pioneers and Aviators, A Century of Irish Aviation." The book was officially unveiled at an event held at Casement Aerodrome in Baldonnel, Co. Dublin, attended by Taoiseach Enda Kenny TD, Domhnal Slattery (Avolon CEO), Eamonn Brennan (Chief Executive of the Irish Aviation Authority), and Brigadier General Paul Fry (GOC of the Air Corps).

== Europe's first MSc in Aviation Finance ==
In April 2016, the UCD Michael Smurfit Graduate Business School launched the first MSc in Aviation Finance in Europe. Avolon, along with other prominent aircraft leasing companies, is an industry partner for this master's degree program.

The primary objective of the course is to support and maintain Ireland's status as the largest hub for aviation finance and leasing worldwide.

== Initiatives with the Royal Hibernian Academy ==
In October 2015, Avolon announced two initiatives in collaboration with the Royal Hibernian Academy (RHA) as part of its corporate and social responsibility program. These initiatives are the Avolon Global Studio and the Avolon Youthreach Program. The launch event was attended by Domhnal Slattery, Avolon CEO; Mick O'Dea, RHA President; and Patrick T. Murphy, RHA Director.

Avolon Global Studio: In partnership with Avolon, the RHA initiated a global search for an artist who would be awarded a 6-month studio placement at the RHA during 2016, 2017, and 2018. The first residency began in July 2016, offering an international artist a six-month placement at the RHA to further develop their work. In April 2016, Avolon and the RHA announced that Colombian artist Adriana Salazar would be the first participant in the Avolon Global Studio Program. The second artist to join the program in 2017 was Iranian artist Jinoos Taghizadeh. The selection for the third artist to receive the Avolon Global Studio Award will be from India.

Avolon Youthreach Program: In collaboration with the national Youthreach scheme, the RHA will invite six young students, chosen from submissions received from the 160 Youthreach Centers across the country, to participate in four workshops. These workshops aim to enhance their artistic skills, introduce them to art galleries and colleges, and provide fundamental tools of artistic criticism. By working alongside practicing artists, the students will not only develop practical skills but also gain insights into the opportunities and challenges of pursuing a professional artistic career in Ireland.

== Awards ==
Avolon has been recognized with various industry awards, including the Airfinance Journal 2020 Lessor of the Year Award. In 2016, Avolon received the Company of the Year and Aviation Leasing Achievement of the Year Awards at the Aviation Industry Awards. Domhnal Slattery, CEO of Avolon, was honored with the Outstanding Contribution to the Aviation Industry award in 2016. Slattery has also been awarded the NYU Ireland House 2020 Lewis L. Glucksman Award for Leadership and the 2021 Ireland-US Council Award for Outstanding Achievement.
