= Dubai Aerospace Enterprise =

Aviation services corporation

Dubai Aerospace Enterprise Ltd (DAE) دبي لصناعات الطيران
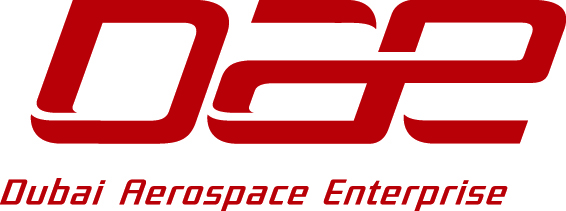
- Type: Private company
- Industry: Aviation and Aircraft Leasing Industry
- Founder: Ahmed bin Saeed Al Maktoum
- Headquarters: Dubai, United Arab Emirates
- Key people: Ahmed bin Saeed Al Maktoum (Chairman); Khalifa Al Daboos (Managing Director); Firoz Tarapore (Chief Executive Officer)
- Owner: Investment Corporation of Dubai
- Website: www.dubaiaerospace.com

Dubai Aerospace Enterprise Ltd (DAE) (Arabic: دبي لصناعات الطيران) is an aviation services corporation with two divisions: DAE Capital and DAE Engineering. Headquartered in Dubai, DAE serves over 200 airline customers in over 85 countries from its eight office locations in Dubai, Dublin, London, Amman, Singapore, Miami, Seattle, and San Francisco.

== DAE Engineering ==
Located at the Queen Alia International Airport in Amman-Jordan, DAE Engineering provides regional MRO services to customers in Europe, Middle East, Africa, and South Asia from its facility in Amman, Jordan, accommodating up to 24 wide and narrow body aircraft. It is authorized to work on 16 aircraft types and has regulatory approval from over 30 regulators globally.

== DAE Capital ==
DAE Capital is the largest aircraft leasing firm in the Middle East. DAE Capital is an aircraft lessor with an owned, managed, and committed fleet of approximately 1,000 Airbus, ATR, and Boeing aircraft with a fleet value of US$35 billion, which are leased to various airlines around the world.

In August 2017, DAE completed the acquisition of Dublin-based AWAS, propelling DAE into the top tier of global aircraft lessors. In May 2025, DAE completed the acquisition of Nordic Aviation Capital, making it the third-largest aircraft lessor globally by number of aircraft. In August 2026, DAE completed the acquisition of Macquarie AirFinance (MAF), making it the third-largest lessor globally, both by fleet value and number of owned and managed aircraft.
