= Tanzania Government Flight Agency =

Tanzanian government agency managing government aircraft

- Wakala wa Ndege za Serikali (Swahili)
- Logo

Government agency overview
- Formed: 17 May 2002
- Preceding Government agency: Tanzania Government Flight Unit (TGFU)
- Jurisdiction: Tanzania
- Headquarters: Government Flight Building, Sokoine Drive, Dar es Salaam, Tanzania
- Motto: Enjoy government protection in the air
- Employees: 79
- Minister responsible: Prof. Makame Mbalawa, Permanent Minister of Transport and Communications
- Government agency executive: CEO
- Key document: Executive Agencies Act no. 30 of 1997

Tanzania Government Flight Agency (TGFA) is one of the executive agencies of Tanzania. It provides VIP flight services to government officials. The Tanzania Government Flight Agency supports and manages all Tanzanian government aircraft, which it leases to Air Tanzania Company Limited (ATCL).

== History ==
The Tanzania Government Flight Agency was established under the Tanzanian Executive Agencies Act No. 30 of 1997, which came into effect on 17 May 2002, per the Government Notice No. 193. TGFA took over the functions of the Government Flying Unit under the Ministry of Communications and Transport with the purpose of providing air transport services in a more efficient, cost effective, and business-like manner to the Government. In 2018, the Agency was transferred from the Ministry of Works, Transport and Communication to the President’s Office, State House through Government Notice No. 252 of 2018. George Mkuchika was Minister of Transport, heading TGFA, prior to being named Minister of President’s Office Good Governance and Public Services in December 2020. As of December 2020, the Minister of Works and Transport is Leonard Chamuriho, with the airline under the control of Dr. John Magufuli, the President of Tanzania since 2015.

== Air Tanzania Leasing ==
In the government revitalization plan of Air Tanzania in 2016, the government purchased six new planes through the Government Flight agency that are leased to Air Tanzania. In May 2016, the company purchased two Bombardier Q400s, that it received in September 2016. In December 2016, the company further placed four more orders to acquire two Airbus A220-300, one Bombardier Q400 and one Boeing 787 Dreamliner.

In November 2021 at the Dubai Airshow, the company placed four orders with Boeing for one B787 Dreamliner, two B737 max and a B767 freighter.

== Fleet ==
The fleet consists of:

Aircraft	In service	Year acquired	Passengers
Piper PA-31 Navajo	1	1980	
Fokker 50	1 (as of August 2025)	1992	50
Gulfstream G550	1	2004	18
Total	4		

== Gallery ==
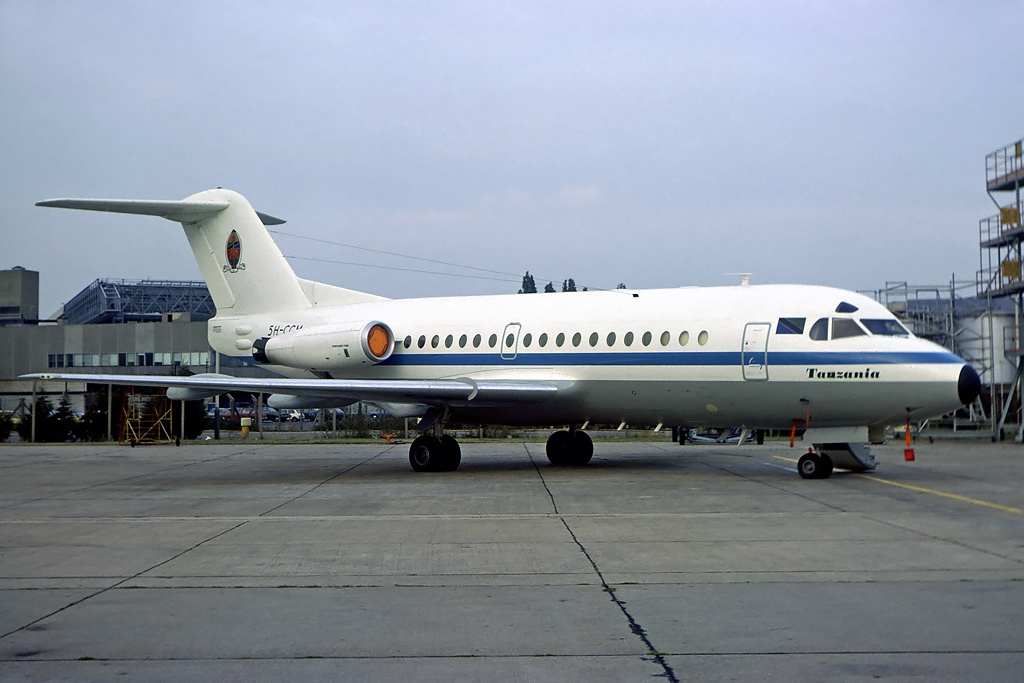
Fokker F-28-3000 Fellowship 5H-CCM, now retired and on display

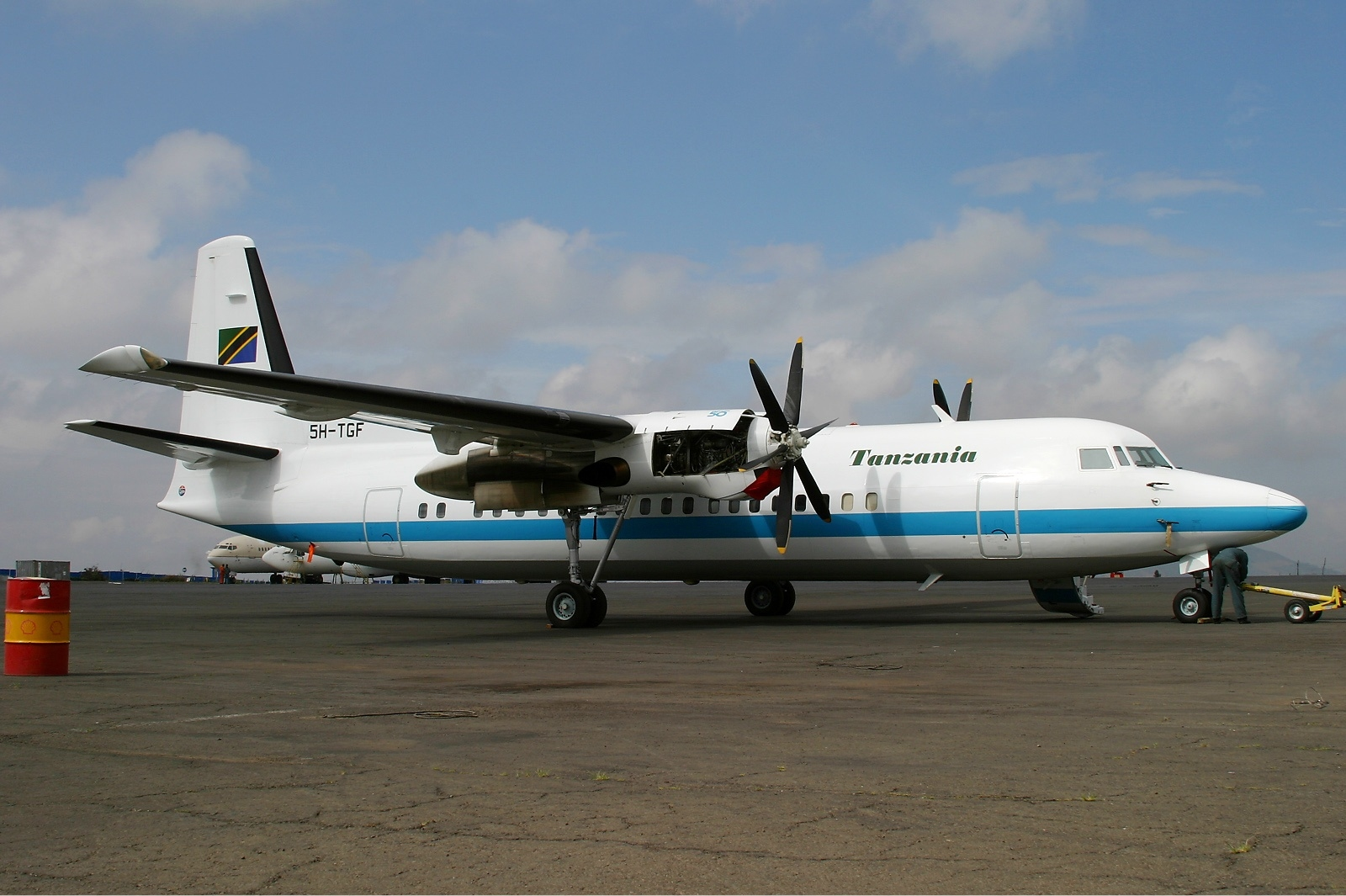
The stationary Fokker 50 5H-ONE

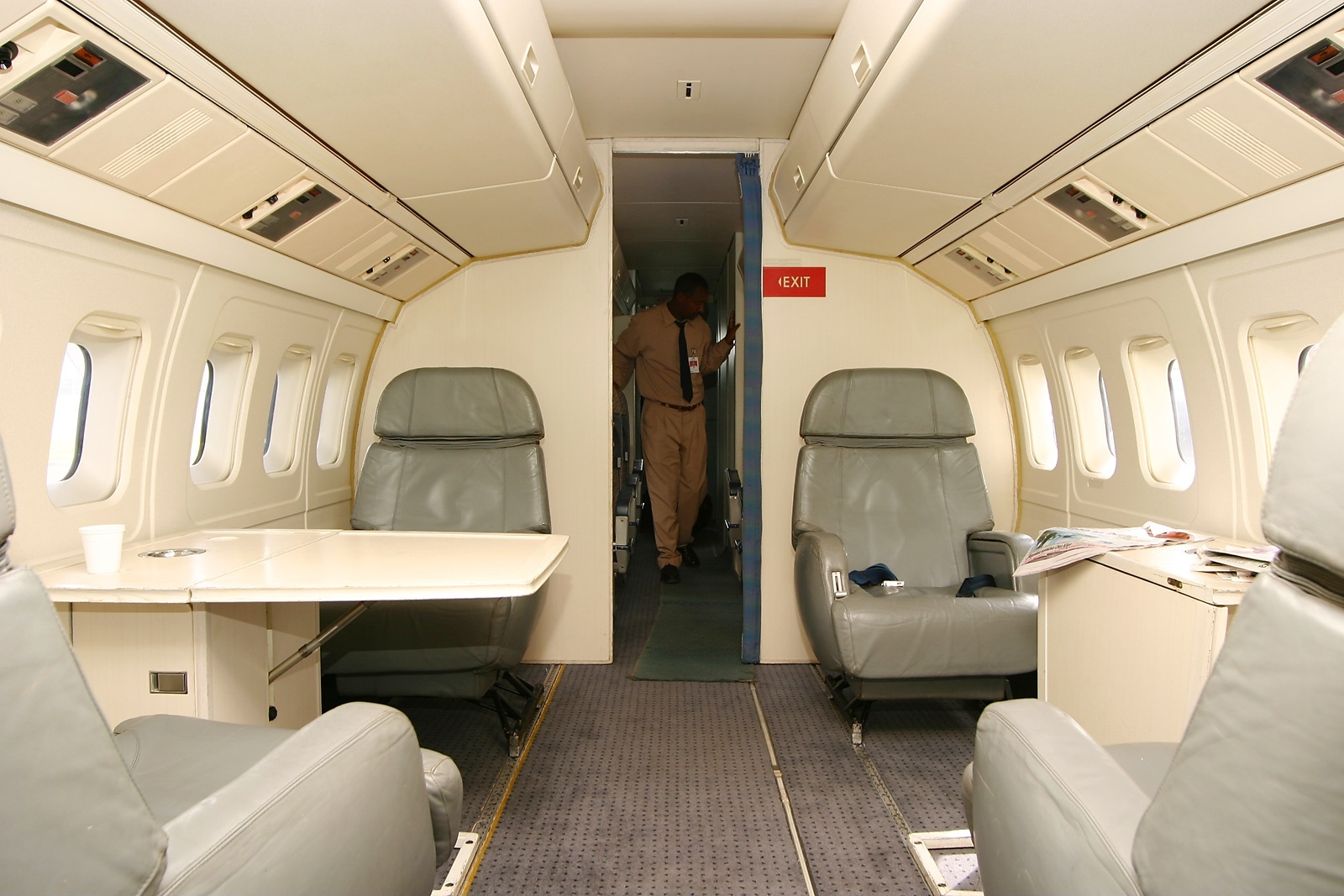
Fokker 50 interior

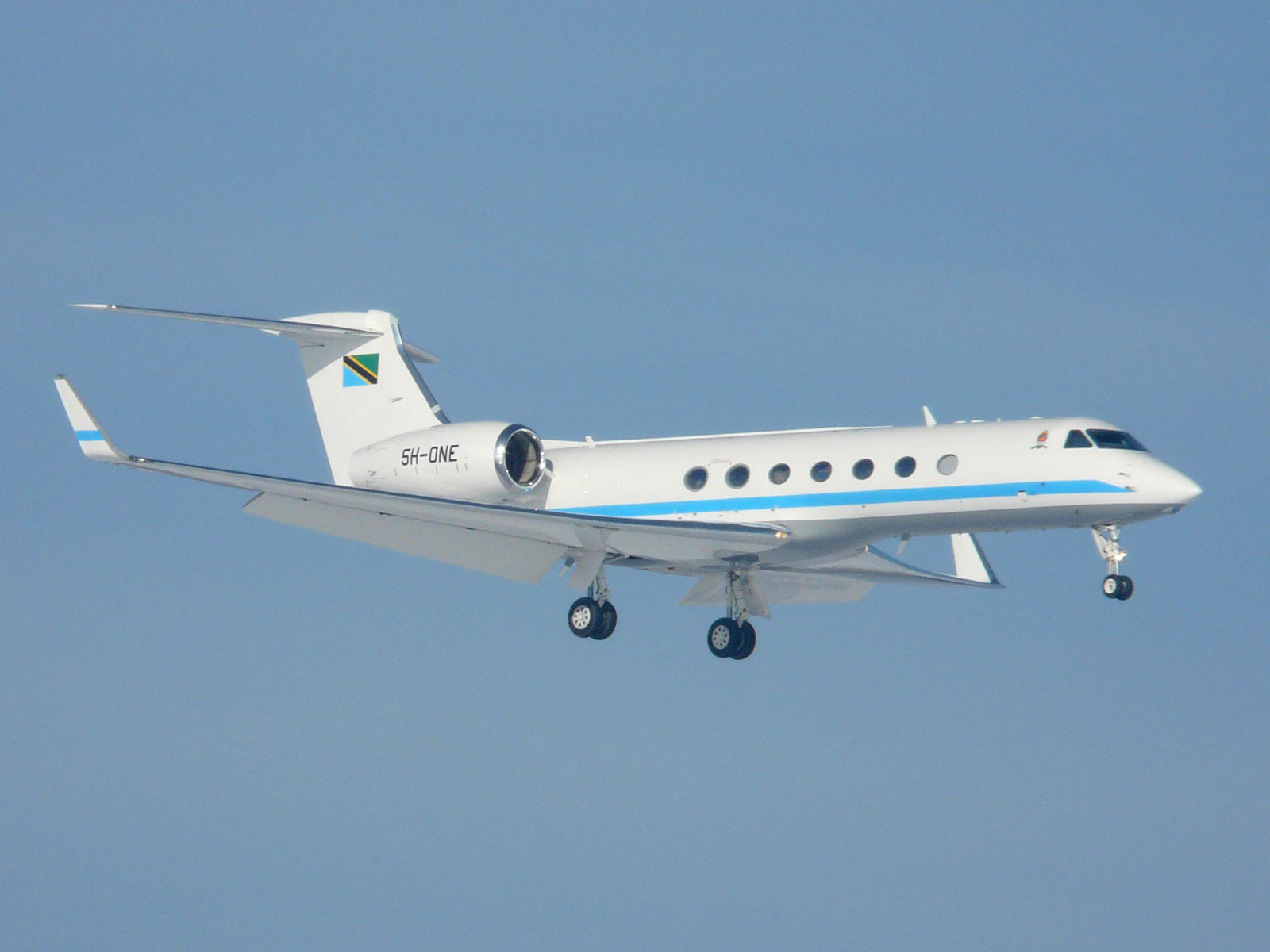
Gulfstream G550 5H-ONE
