= SaudiGulf Airlines =

Regional airline of Saudi Arabia (2013–2020)

SaudiGulf Airlines السعودية الخليجية
IATA	ICAO	Call sign
6S	SGQ	SAUDIGULF
- Founded: 2013
- Commenced operations: 29 October 2016
- Ceased operations: 2020
- Hubs: King Fahd International Airport (Dammam)
- Frequent-flyer program: SaudiGulf Club
- Fleet size: 4
- Destinations: 14
- Parent company: Abdel Hadi Abdullah Al-Qahtani & Sons Group of Companies
- Headquarters: Dammam, Saudi Arabia
- Key people: Tariq Abdul-Hadi Al-Qahtani (Chairman)
- Revenue: $40.4 million
- Employees: 190
- Website: www.saudigulfairlines.com

SaudiGulf Airlines (Arabic: السعودية الخليجية) was a Saudi regional airlines carrier located in Dammam. It was owned by the Al Qahtani Group and became the country's third International carrier, after Saudia and Flynas.

== History ==
SaudiGulf Airlines was established in 2013 by Abdel Hadi Abdullah Al-Qahtani & Sons Group of Companies, a Saudi consortium of privately owned businesses. The airline was planning to start operation in 2015 but encountered regulatory delays with Saudi Arabia's General Authority of Civil Aviation. The airline received its air operator's certificate on 22 June 2016. It launched operations on 29 October 2016 with twice daily flights between Dammam and Riyadh.

On 28 March 2019 SaudiGulf announced the cancellation of its 16 A220-300 orders. This came after an order for 10 A320neos, which SaudiGulf stated would be a better fit for the airline. The first Airbus A320neo was built, registered as VP-CGE, but not delivered as airline operations were suspended due to COVID-19 on 3 June 2020 and the company filed for bankruptcy afterward. Its service was regarded as one of the best in the kingdom before its bankruptcy and many clients were saddened at the cessation of its operations.

== Destinations ==
SaudiGulf Airlines flew to the following destinations as of October 2018:

Country	City	Airport	Notes	Refs
Egypt	Cairo	Cairo International Airport		
Iraq	Baghdad	Baghdad International Airport		
Iraq	Erbil	Erbil International Airport		
Jordan	Amman	Queen Alia International Airport		
Pakistan	Islamabad	Islamabad International Airport		
Pakistan	Karachi	Jinnah International Airport		
Pakistan	Lahore	Allama Iqbal International Airport		
Pakistan	Sialkot	Sialkot International Airport		
Saudi Arabia	Abha	Abha Regional Airport		
Saudi Arabia	Dammam	King Fahd International Airport	Hub	
Saudi Arabia	Jeddah	King Abdulaziz International Airport		
Saudi Arabia	Medina	Prince Mohammad bin Abdulaziz International Airport		
Saudi Arabia	Riyadh	King Khalid International Airport		
United Arab Emirates	Dubai	Dubai International Airport		

== See also ==
- List of defunct airlines of Saudi Arabia
