= SMBC Aviation Capital =

Aircraft leasing company

- Industry: Aircraft leasing
- Headquarters: Dublin, Ireland
- Website: www.smbc.aero

SMBC Aviation Capital is an aircraft leasing company domiciled in Dublin, Ireland. It is owned by a Japanese consortium comprising Sumitomo Mitsui Banking Corporation (SMBC), Sumitomo Corporation, and Sumitomo Mitsui Financial Lease, all affiliated with either the Sumitomo or Mitsui groups.

== History ==
The company was founded in 1994 as International Aviation Management Group by Domhnal Slattery. In 2001, Royal Bank of Scotland Group acquired the company and rebranded it as Lombard Aviation Capital. The company was rebranded again in 2004 as RBS Aviation Capital.

By 2005, the company had taken delivery of its 200th aircraft and opened locations in Toulouse and Seattle, with expansion into South East Asia in 2007. 2009 saw the completion of its first export financing deal and also the location of a representative in Beijing.

In 2012, the company was acquired by the Japanese consortium for $7.3 billion, which was the largest ever global sale of an aircraft leasing business. The sale completed on 1 June 2012 and the business was renamed SMBC Aviation Capital.

On September 2, 2025, Air Lease Corporation announced that it is expected to be acquired by a consortium that includes SMBC Aviation Capital, along with Sumitomo Corporation, Apollo, and Brookfield, for approximately US$ 7.4 billion. The transaction is expected to be closed by the first quarter of FY2026. Following the transaction, SMBC Aviation Capital will service the majority of the new corporation's fleet.
