= List of charter airlines =

This is a list of notable charter airlines and leisure airlines which are in operation.

== Asia ==
Indonesia

- Airfast Indonesia
- EastIndo
- Indonesia Air Transport
- Premiair
- Travira Air

Jordan

- Arab Wings
- Jordan Aviation

Kazakhstan

- Sunday Airlines

Malaysia

- Amal
- Berjaya Air
- Weststar Aviation

Myanmar

- Union Express Charter Airline

Qatar

- Qatar Amiri Flight

== Africa ==
Egypt

- AMC Airlines
- Red Sea Airlines

Kenya

- 748 Air Services

South Africa

- Allegiance Air
- Civair
- Comair Flight Services
- Federal Air
- Global Aviation
- Phoebus Apollo Aviation
- Safair
- Solenta Aviation

Sudan

- Blue Bird Aviation

Tanzania

- Safari Plus

== The Americas ==
Canada

- Air Canada Jetz
- Air Transat
- Chrono Aviation
- Nolinor Aviation
- North Cariboo Air
- Summit Air

United States

- Atlas Air
- Berry Aviation
- CSI Aviation, Inc.
- Eastern Airlines
- Elite Airways
- GlobalX Airlines
- National Airlines
- NetJets
- Omni Air International
- Reliant Air
- Sierra Pacific Airlines
- Skymax
- USA Jet Airlines
- World Atlantic Airlines
- XOJET

Venezuela

- Albatros Airlines
- Venezolana

== Europe ==
Belgium

- TUI fly Belgium

Bulgaria

- Bul Air
- BH Air
- Electra Airways
- European Air Charter
- Fly2Sky Airlines
- GullivAir

Croatia

- Trade Air
- ETF Airways

Denmark

- Jet Time
- Sunclass Airlines

France

- Corsair

Czech Republic

- ABS Jets
- Grossmann Jet Service
- Van Air Europe

Estonia

- FLYEST
- Smartlynx Airlines Estonia

Germany

- Condor
- Discover Airlines
- TUI fly Deutschland
- Sundair

Greece

- Air Mediterranean
- Amjet Executive
- GainJet
- Hellenic Seaplanes
- Marathon Airlines
- Olympus Airways

Hungary

- Smartwings Hungary

Iceland

- Air Atlanta Icelandic

Italy

- Neos

Latvia

- SmartLynx Airlines

Lithuania

- Heston Airlines

Ireland

- Emerald Airlines
- Fly4

Malta

- Air Atlanta Europe
- Air Horizont
- AirX Charter
- Corendon Airlines Europe
- Freebird Airlines Europe
- Hi Fly Malta
- Malta MedAir

Netherlands

- Corendon Dutch Airlines
- TUI fly Netherlands

Poland

- Buzz
- Enter Air
- LOT Charters
- Smartwings Poland
- Royal - Star Sp. z o.o.

Portugal

- Everjets
- EuroAtlantic Airways
- Hi Fly
- Orbest
- White Airways

Romania

- Air Bucharest
- Carpatair

Russia

- Azur Air
- I-Fly
- Nordwind Airlines
- Pegas Fly
- Royal Flight

Spain

- Evelop Airlines
- Privilege Style
- Wamos Air
- World2Fly

Slovakia

- Smartwings Slovakia
- AirExplore

Sweden

- TUI fly Nordic
- Novair

Switzerland

- Edelweiss Air

Turkey

- Corendon Airlines
- Freebird Airlines
- Tailwind Airlines
- Southwind Airlines

Ukraine

- Azur Air Ukraine
- Windrose Airlines

United Kingdom

- Jet2
- Titan Airways
- TUI Airways
- Ascend Airways

== Exceptions ==
Several more scheduled airlines offer or offered additional charter services as well; among them:

- Air Inuit
- Air Tindi
- Alliance Airlines
- Champion Air
- Cinnamon Air
- Citybird
- Frontier Flying Service
- Hong Kong Airlines
- Kelowna Flightcraft Air Charter
- Ladeco
- Luzair
- Magnicharters
- Palmair
- Petra Airlines
- Rayyan Air

== Defunct ==
=== Africa ===
Egypt

- Air Leisure
- Lotus Air
- Shorouk Air

Nigeria

- Kabo Air
- TAT Nigeria

Tunisia

- Jasmin Airways

=== America ===
United States

- Arrow Air
- Capitol Air
- Eastern Air Lines
- Miami Air International
- TransMeridian Airlines

Canada

- Skyservice
- Thomas Cook Airlines Canada

=== Asia ===
China

- East Star Airlines

Qatar

- Rizon Jet

Thailand

- Asia Atlantic Airlines
- Jet Asia Airways

United Arab Emirates

- RAK Airways

Uzbekistan

- Samarkand Airways

=== Australia and Oceania ===
Australia

- OzJet

=== Europe ===
Austria

- Lauda Air

Croatia

- Air Adriatic

Germany

- Azur Air Germany
- LTU
- Paninternational
- Small Planet Airlines (Germany)
- SunExpress Deutschland
- Thomas Cook Aviation
- XL Airways Germany

Ireland

- Eirjet
- TransAer International Airlines

Lithuania

- Small Planet Airlines

Russia

- Dalavia
- Estar Avia
- Kogalymavia
- VIM-Avia

Slovenia

- Aurora Airlines

Spain

- Pyrenair

Turkey

- Air Alfa
- Akdeniz Airlines
- Albatros Airlines (Turkey)
- Ankair
- Bestair
- Birgenair
- Boğaziçi Hava Taşımacılığı
- Golden International Airlines
- Holiday Airlines
- Inter Airlines
- Saga Airlines
- Sultan Air
- Sunways
- Tarhan Tower Airlines
- TUR European Airways
- Turkuaz Airlines

United Kingdom

- Capital Airlines (UK)
- First Choice Airways
- JMC Air
- Thomas Cook Airlines
- Thomsonfly
- Virgin Sun Airlines
- XL Airways UK

== See also ==
- List of low-cost airlines
- Flag carrier
- List of regional airlines
