= List of defunct airlines of Turkey =

This is a list of defunct airlines of Turkey.

Airline	Image	IATA	ICAO	Callsign	Commenced operations	Ceased operations	Notes
ACT Airlines		9T	RUN	CARGO TURK	2004	2011	Rebranded as MyCargo Airlines
Active Air			AKT;AKV		1995	1996	
Air Alfa		H7	LFA	Air Alfa	1992	1997	Renamed/merged to Alfa Airlines
Air Anatolia		TD	NTL	Air Anatolia	1998	2003	
Air Berlin Turkey		AB	BER		2011	2013	Absorbed into Pegasus Airlines
Airgroup Havacilik			AGH		1993	2004	
Akdeniz Airlines			AKD	AKDENIZ AIRLINES	1995	1995	
Albatros Airlines		8Z	ABK	Air Albatros	1992	1996	
Alfa Airlines		H7	LFA		1997	2002	
Anadolu			AJA		1989	1989	
Anadolu Express					2000	2001	
Anex Airlines					2000	2001	
Ankair			VVF	WORLDFOCUS	2008	2008	
AtlasGlobal		KK	KKK	ATLASGLOBAL	2001	2020	
Baron Air Cargo			BGK		2004	2004	Rebranded as Kuzu Airlines Cargo
Bestair		5F	BST	BARBIE	2006	2009	
Birgenair		KT	BHY	BIRGENAIR	1988	1996	
Boğaziçi Hava Taşımacılığı		PQ	BHT	Basfir	1987	1989	
Borajet		YB	BRJ	BORA JET	2010	2017	
Bosphorus Airways		6Z	BSP	Bosphorus	1991	1994	
Bosphorus European Airways			BHY		2001	2004	
BAL		WL;FB			1977	1981	
Cargo Air Transport					2003	2004	
Dardanel Air			DRD		1999	1999	
Devlet Hava Yolları					1938	1954	Merged to Turkish Airlines
Dogus Air					1998	2000	
Ekspress Airlines					1999	1999	
Euro Sun			ESN		2000	2001	
Express Airlines					2001	2001	
Fly Air		F2	FLM	FLY AIR	2002	2007	Ceased operations
Global Air Cargo			GLH		1995	1996	
Golden International Airlines			GTC	Golden Wings	2007	2007	
Greenair		WK	GRN		1990	1994	Merged to Active Air
GTI Airlines					1996	1999	Merged to Air Anatolia
Han Air					1995	1998	
Holiday Airlines		HW	HLD		1994	1996	Ceased operations
Imsik					1988	1988	
Inter Airlines		6K	INX	INTER-EURO	1999	2008	
Istair					1986	1988	
Istanbul Airlines					1986	2000	
IZair		4I	IZM	IZMIR	2006	2018	Absorbed into Pegasus Airlines
Karadeniz Airlines			AZG		1980	1996	
Marin Air					2004	2004	
Marmara Air					1986	1986	
MyCargo Airlines		9T	RUN	CARGO TURK	2011	2017	Rebranded as Air ACT
Nesu Air					1984	1990	
Noble Air		HK	NAD	NOBLEAIR	1989	1991	
Orbit Express Airlines		OA	ORX	OREX	2003	2004	Merged to ACT Airlines
Onur Air		8Q	OHY	ONUR AIR	1992	2021	It was forced to suspend all operations until further notice in 2021 and was declared bankrupt in April 2022
Pan Havacilik			PHT		1998	2006	
Rose Air			ROZ	Air Rose	1999	2000	Grounded by Turkish CAA since three aircraft are minimal fleet size. To be relaunched as Euro Sun.
Saga Airlines		H3	SGX	SAGA	2004	2013	
Sky Airlines		ZY	SHY	SKY POWER	2001	2013	
Sönmez Airlines					1984	2005	
Sultan Air		KJ	SUT	SULTAN	1989	1993	
SUNWAY Intersun Havacilik Anonym Sirketi		IS	SWW	Intersun	1995	1997	
Talia Airways		XW			1987	1988	
Tarhan Tower Airlines		TTH			2006	2007	
Tayfunair		Z4	TAY		1995	1998	
THT Hava Yollari		ZH	THT		1989	1993	Merged to Turkish Airlines
Top Air		B6	TOP		1990	1998	
Toros Air		CN	TAU		1986	1989	
Trans-Asia Airlines					1998	1998	
TRUVA					1996	1996	
TUR European Airways		YI	TCT	TurAvrupa	1987	1994	
Turkish Express					2007	2007	Rebranded as AnadoluJet
Turkol					1981	1981	
Turkuaz Airlines			TRK	TURKU	2006	2010	Bankrupt
United European Airways			UEL		1992	1993	
UPS Turkey			UNS		2004	2006	
VIP-Air					1991	1992	Formed by Sultan Air, then reintegrated.
World Focus Airlines			VVF	WorldFocus	2005	2008	Changed name to Ankair

== See also ==
- List of airlines of Turkey
- List of airports in Turkey
