= List of airline codes (O) =

This is a list of all airline codes. The table lists the IATA airline designators, the ICAO airline designators and the airline call signs (telephony designator). Historical assignments are also included for completeness.

== Codes ==
Airline codes
IATA	ICAO	Airline	Call sign	Country	Comments
	ORN	Orange Air	ORANGE JET	United States	Allocated in 2014
IP	ONS	One Airlines	AIR DREAMS	Chile	
	FET	Old Dominion Freight Lines	FREIGHT LINE	United States	
	OCN	O Air	O-BIRD	France	defunct
UQ	OCM	O'Connor Airlines	OCONNOR	Australia	Defunct - Bankrupt
	DRL	Omni Air Transport	DRILLER	United States	
	OWE	Owenair	OWENAIR	South Africa	
OB	AAN	Oasis Airlines	Oasis	Spain	defunct
O8	OHK	Oasis Hong Kong Airlines	OASIS	Hong Kong	Defunct
	BCN	Ocean Air	BLUE OCEAN	Mauritania	
VC	VCX	Ocean Airlines	OCEANCARGO	Italy	
	OCS	Ocean Sky UK	OCEANSKY	United Kingdom	
	TUK	Ocean Wings Commuter Service	TUCKERNUCK	United States	New Island Connections
O2		Linear Air	HARPOON	United States	Allocated in 2017
	ODS	Odessa Airlines	ODESSA AIR	Ukraine	
	FOC	Office Federal De'Aviation Civile	FOCA	Switzerland	
	GBO	Ogooue Air Cargo		Gabon	
	OKJ	Okada Airlines	OKADA AIR	Nigeria	
	OKP	Okapi Airways	OKAPI	Democratic Republic of Congo	
	OKA	Okay Airways	OKAYJET	China	
	OKL	Oklahoma Department of Public Safety	OKLAHOMA	United States	Troop O
	OLX	Olimex Aerotaxi	OLIMEX	Czech Republic	
	KVK	Olimp Air	PONTA	Kazakhstan	
OL	OLT	OLT Express Germany	OLTRA	Germany	
OA	OAL	Olympic Air	OLYMPIC	Greece	
	OLY	Olympic Aviation	OLAVIA	Greece	
WY	OMA	Oman Air	OMAN AIR	Oman	
	ORF	Oman Royal Flight	OMAN	Oman	
OV	OMS	SalamAir	MAZOON	Oman	Oman’s first Low Cost Carrier
	OAV	Omni - Aviacao e Tecnologia	OMNI	Portugal	
OY	OAE	Omni Air International	OMNI-EXPRESS	United States	
	ONI	OMNI AVIATION TRAINING CENTER	OMNI TRAINING	Portugal	Part of the same group as Omni - Aviacao e Tecnologia
	OMF	Omniflys	OMNIFLYS	Mexico	
	ORL	On Air Limited	ON AIR	Canada	
	OST	Oklahoma State University	OSTATE	United States	
	OTG	One Two Go Airlines	THAI EXPRESS	Thailand	
	OTM	Onetime Airlines Zambia	ZEDTIME	Zambia	
	MED	Ontario Ministry of Health	MEDICAL	Canada	
8Q	OHY	Onur Air	ONUR AIR	Turkey	
	OPA	Opal Air		Australia	
	OSA	Open Sky Aviation		Lebanon	
	BOS	OpenSkies	MISTRAL	United Kingdom	
	ORR	Operadora Turistica Aurora	TURISTICA AURORA	Mexico	
	OLE	Operadora de Lineas Ejecutivas	OPERADORA	Mexico	
	OTP	Operadora de Transportes Aéreos	OPERADORA AEREO	Mexico	
	OPV	Operadora de Veulos Ejectutivos	OPERADORA DE VUELOS	Mexico	
	LLO	Operation Enduring Freedom	APOLLO	Canada	
	OAX	Operational Aviation Services		Australia	
	ORD	Orange Air Services	ORANGE SERVICES	Sierra Leone	
	ORJ	Orange Air Sierra Leone	ORANGE SIERRA	Sierra Leone	
	ORE	Orange Aviation	ORANGE AVIATION	Israel	
	ORX	Orbit Express Airlines	OREX	Turkey	
	ORK	Orca Air	ORCA TAXI	Egypt	
	BUE	Orebro Aviation	BLUELIGHT	Sweden	
	ORM	Orel State Air Enterprise	ORPRISE	Russia	
R2	ORB	Orenburg Airlines	ORENBURG	Russia	
	OTA	Organizacion De Transportes Aéreos	ORGANIZACION	Mexico	
	OML	Organizacoes Mambra	MAMBRA	Angola	
	OVV	Orient Air	ORIENTSYR	Syrian Arab Republic	
	OTR	Orient Airlines	ORIENTROC	Sudan	
	ORN	Orient Airways	ORIENT LINER	Pakistan	
OX	OEA	Orient Thai Airlines	ORIENT THAI	Thailand	
	NGK	Oriental Air Bridge	ORIENTAL BRIDGE	Japan	
	OAC	Oriental Airlines	ORIENTAL AIR	Nigeria	
QO	OGN	Origin Pacific Airways	ORIGIN	New Zealand	
	OED	Orion Air Charter	ORION CHARTER	South Africa	
	OIX	Orion-x	ORIONIX	Russia	
	KOV	Orlan-2000	ORLAN	Kazakhstan	
	RNG	Orange Aircraft Leasing	ORANGE	Netherlands	
	OAD	Orscom Tourist Installations Company	ORSCOM	Egypt	
	JPA	OSACOM	J-PAT	United States	United States Army
	OSH	Osh Avia	OSH AVIA	Kyrgyzstan	
	OCO	Ostend Air College	AIR COLLEGE	Belgium	
	ODY	Odyssey International	ODYSSEY	Canada	
	FNL	Oulun Tilauslento	FINN FLIGHT	Finland	
ON	RON	Our Airline	OUR AIRLINE	Nauru	formerly Air Nauru
	OOT	Out Of The Blue Air Safaris	OOTBAS	South Africa	
OJ	OLA	Overland Airways	OVERLAND	Nigeria	
	OAR	ONE AIR	BOSS AIR	Spain	
	OXE	Oxaero	OXOE	United Kingdom	
	WDK	Oxford Air Services	WOODSTOCK	United Kingdom	
	OAA	Oxley Aviation		Australia	
OZ	OZR	Ozark Air Lines	OZARK	United States	Defunct
O7	OZJ	OzJet	AUSJET	Australia	
	OSU	Ohio State University	SCARLET	United States	
OA	OAL	Olympic Airlines	OLYMPIC	Greece	Defunct
OB	AAN	Oasis International Airlines Now assigned to Boliviana de Aviacion (BoA)	OASIS	Spain	Ceased operations
	ORT	Ortac	SKYWALKER	Jersey	

== IATA Traffic Conference Areas ==
The International Air Transport Association (IATA) divides the world into three areas called the Traffic Conference Areas (TCAs) for air travel purposes. These areas are used to define geographical boundaries for fare construction and other industry-related practices:

- Traffic Conference Area 1 (TC1) – this area includes the Americas, encompassing North America (the Caribbean, Central America, and Northern America) and South America.
- Traffic Conference Area 2 (TC2) – this area includes the EMEA region, encompassing Europe, the Middle East, and Africa (North Africa and Sub-Saharan Africa).
- Traffic Conference Area 3 (TC3) – this area includes the Asia–Pacific region, encompassing the rest of Asia (Central Asia, East Asia, North Asia, South Asia, and Southeast Asia) and Oceania.

Essentially, TC1 covers the "New World", while TC2 and TC3 together cover the "Old World" (Africa-Eurasia) and the "Land Down Under".

== See also ==
- IATA airport code
- ICAO airport code
