= Albatros Airlines =

Albatros Airlines may refer to:

- Albatros Airlines (Turkey)
- Albatros Airlines (Venezuela)

== See also ==
- Albatros Airways
