= Estar =

Estar may refer to:

- Estar, West Virginia, unincorporated community in West Virginia, United States
- Estar Avia, passenger charter airline based in Russia
- eSTAR project, multi-agent system that aims to implement a true heterogeneous network of robotic telescopes for automated observing
- Navistar eStar, electric van by Navistar International
- One of the Romance copula forms (i.e. the verb "to be")
- ESTAR Base, the Eastman Kodak brand of BOPET film
