= Istanbul Airlines =

Turkish charter airline

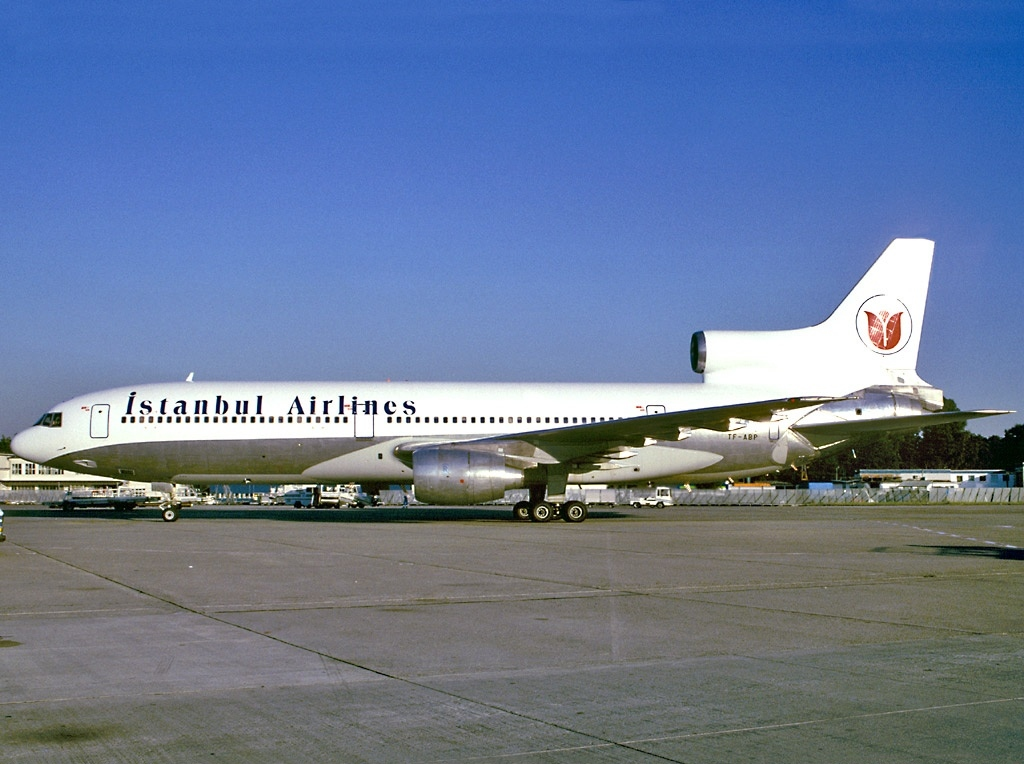
IATA	ICAO	Call sign
IL	IST	ISTANBUL
- Founded: December 1985
- Ceased operations: August 24, 2000
- Hubs: Istanbul Atatürk Airport
- Fleet size: 7

Istanbul Airlines (İstanbul Hava Yolları) was a Turkish charter airline that also operated domestic scheduled flights beginning in February 1996. The company ceased operations in 2000.

== History ==
Istanbul Airlines was founded in Istanbul in December 1985 by private Turkish investors. It commenced operations on March 14, 1986, with two Sud Aviation Caravelle aircraft acquired from the airline SAT Flug and two BAC 1-11s leased from the Romanian airline TAROM.

In its first year, the airline carried 105,122 passengers.

After Istanbul Airlines acquired additional tour operators as customers, including the holiday provider Öger Tours, the fleet was expanded in 1987 with two additional Caravelle aircraft and in 1988 with a Boeing 737-400.

.A batch of leased Boeing 727-200 aircraft were introduced in 1991, gradually replacing the Caravelles, which were out of production since 1972.

During the 1990s, Istanbul Airlines developed into one of Turkey's leading charter airlines and modernized its fleet with leased Boeing 737 and Boeing 757 aircraft.

Following the deregulation of Turkish aviation with many small airlines founded as a result such as Atlasjet, Albatros Airlines, Alfa Airlines, Bosphorus Airways, and Greenair Istanbul Airlines also began operating scheduled flights within Turkey from February 1996.

On August 24, 2000, the airline ceased operations.

== Fleet ==
=== Fleet at closing ===
At the time of the cessation of operations, Istanbul Airlines' fleet consisted of five Boeing 737-400s, one Boeing 737-800 and one Lockheed L-1011 TriStar leased from Air Atlanta Icelandic.

=== The airline formerly operated the following aircraft ===
- BAC 111-500
- Boeing 727-200
- Boeing 737-200, 737-300
- Boeing 757-200
- Sud Aviation Caravelle

== See also ==
- List of defunct airlines of Turkey
