= Turkuaz =

Turkuaz (Turkish for "turquoise") may refer to:

- Turkuaz Media Group, a Turkish media company
- Isuzu Turkuaz, a midibus model
- RV MTA Turkuaz, a Turkish research and survey vessel
- Turkuaz Airlines, a defunct Turkish charter airline
- Turkuaz (band), American funk band
- Turkuaz campus, a campus of Çankaya University in Turkey

== See also ==
- Turkuaz Kitchen
- tr:Turkuaz (anlam ayrımı), a disambiguation page on Turkish Wikipedia
