= OED (disambiguation) =

The OED is the Oxford English Dictionary, the principal historical dictionary of the English language.

OED or oed may also refer to:

== Places in Austria ==
- Oed-Öhling, a town in Amstetten District
- Oed, various hamlets in Melk District

== Other uses ==
- Online Etymology Dictionary, a website giving English word origins
- Orion Air Charter (ICAO airline code: OED)
