= EVJ =

EVJ, Evj, or eVJ may refer to:

== eVJ ==
- eVJ++, an implementation of Visual J++ as part of Microsoft's embedded programming languages suite that includes Embedded Visual Basic

== Evj ==
- Evj!, producer of Cool Again by Gabriela Anders and featuring Wayne Krantz

== EVJ ==
- EVJ, ICAO code for Portuguese airline Everjets
