= IWD =

IWD may refer to:

== Businesses ==
- Iberworld, a Spanish airline (ICAO code: IWD)
- IShares Russell 1000 Value Index, an American exchange-traded fund (ticker: IWD)
- Ivor Watkins Dow, an American agricultural supplier

== Events ==
- International Women's Day, on March 8
- International Workers' Day, on May 1

== Other uses ==
- Gogebic–Iron County Airport, Michigan, United States (IATA code: IWD)
- Individual wheel drive, a vehicle drivetrain layout
