= Rizon (disambiguation) =

Rizon is an Internet Relay Chat (IRC) network.

Rizon may also refer to:

- Rizon Jet, an Arab defunct airline
- Rizon Trucks, an electric truck brand from Daimler Truck
- Stéphan Rizon (born 1987), a French singer

== See also ==
- Rizong Monastery, a Buddhist monastery in Ladakh, India
