= Iberojet (airline) =

Charter airline of Spain and Portugal

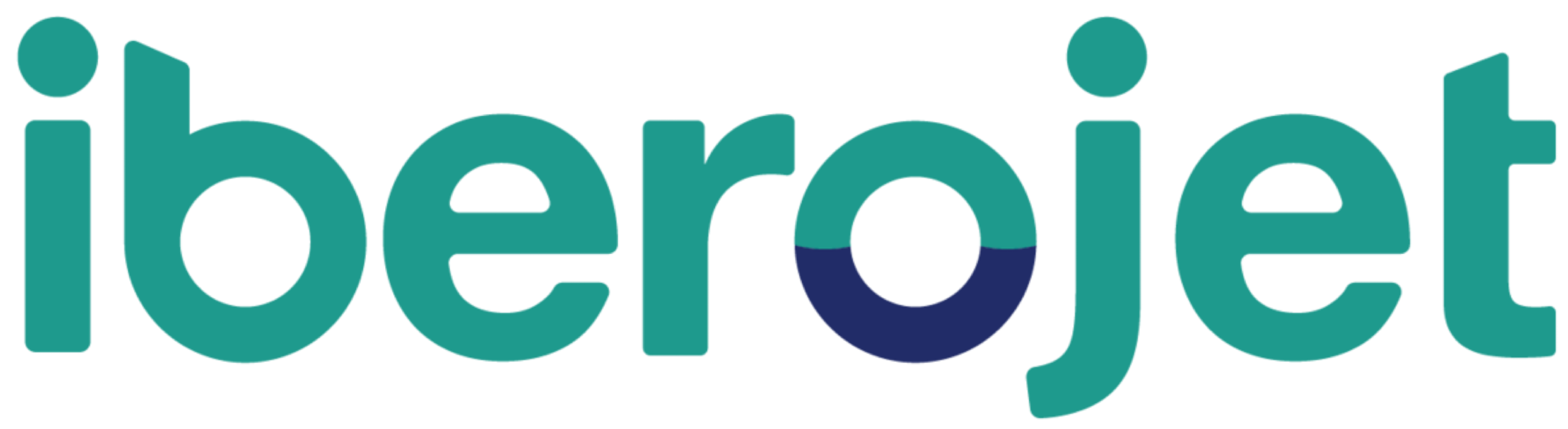

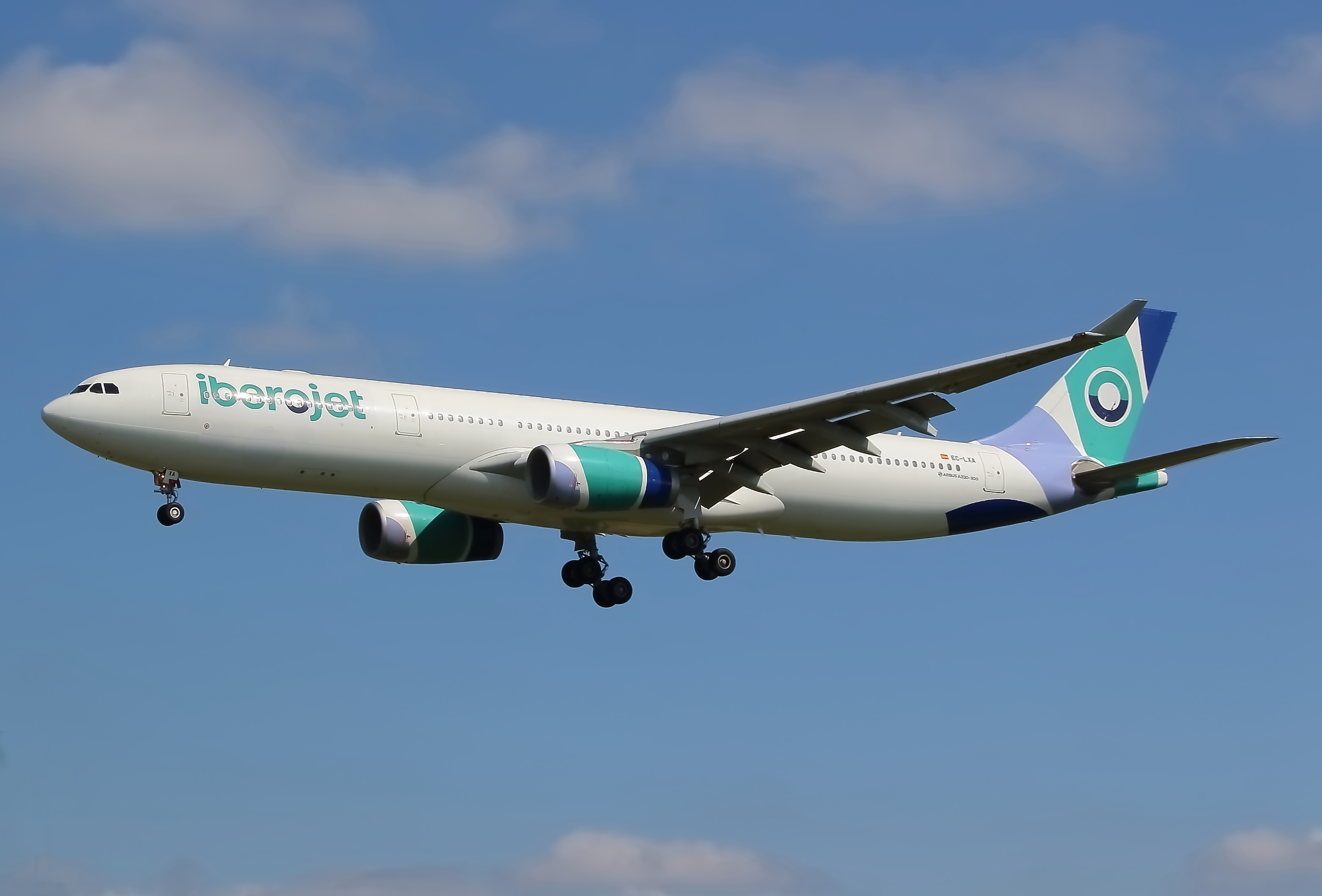
- Iberojet Airbus A330-300
IATA	ICAO	Call sign
E9	EVE	EVELOP
- Founded: 2013; 13 years ago (as Evelop Airlines)
- Commenced operations: 2020; 6 years ago (as Iberojet)
- AOC #: ES.AOC.123 (Spain); PT-01/07 (Portugal)
- Operating bases: Lisbon; Madrid
- Fleet size: 7
- Destinations: 15
- Parent company: Barceló Group
- Headquarters: Palma de Mallorca, Spain; Lisbon, Portugal
- Website: www.iberojet.com

Iberojet is a Spanish-Portuguese regular, wet lease and charter airline that operates long-haul flights out of Madrid, Spain and Lisbon, Portugal on behalf of tour operators or as part of leases aircraft for other airlines. The airline has registered offices in Palma de Mallorca and Lisbon.

The company has a policy where each flight has seven Portuguese and seven Spanish crew members (six cabin crew and a pilot) to ensure that the crew can speak both Spanish and Portuguese.

== History ==
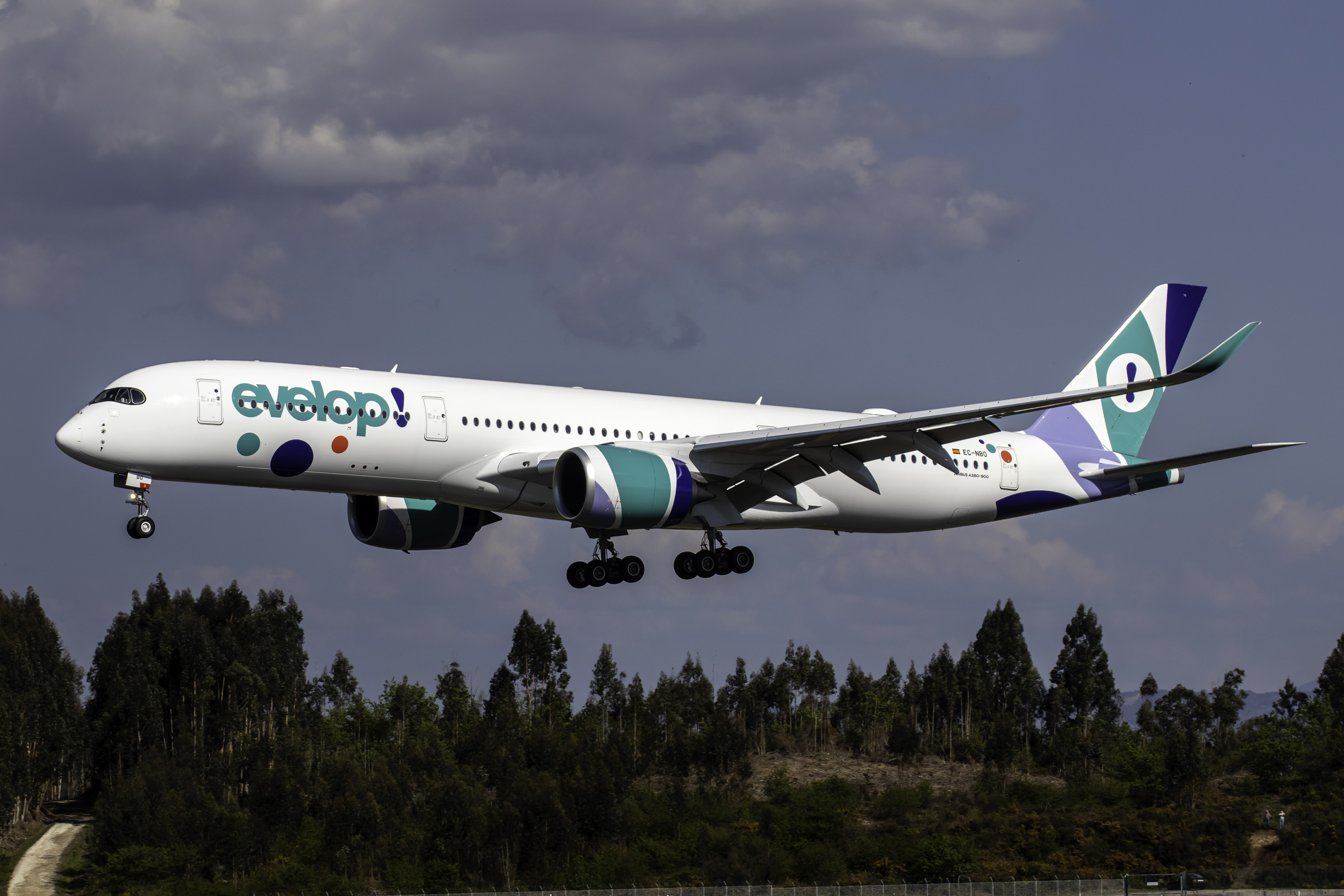
Iberojet Airbus A350-900 in former Evelop livery

The company is owned by Barceló Viajes (English: Barceló Trips), and was bought by Barceló Group in 2013 following the collapse of Orizonia Corporation. Originally, the company was established under the name Evelop Airlines, before it became a sister company to Portuguese airline Orbest under Barceló. On 8 December 2020, Evelop was merged with Orbest and the two airlines subsequently operated under the Iberojet name. Prior to this, Evelop had accumulated a fleet of Airbus widebody aircraft, including its first Airbus A350-900 in 2019, after which the fleets of Evelop and Orbest were combined as part of the merger.

In 2021, Iberojet supplied the UK Home Office with a charter deportation plane. In 2022, Iberojet took over all scheduled long-haul services to the Caribbean from Wamos Air.

== Destinations ==
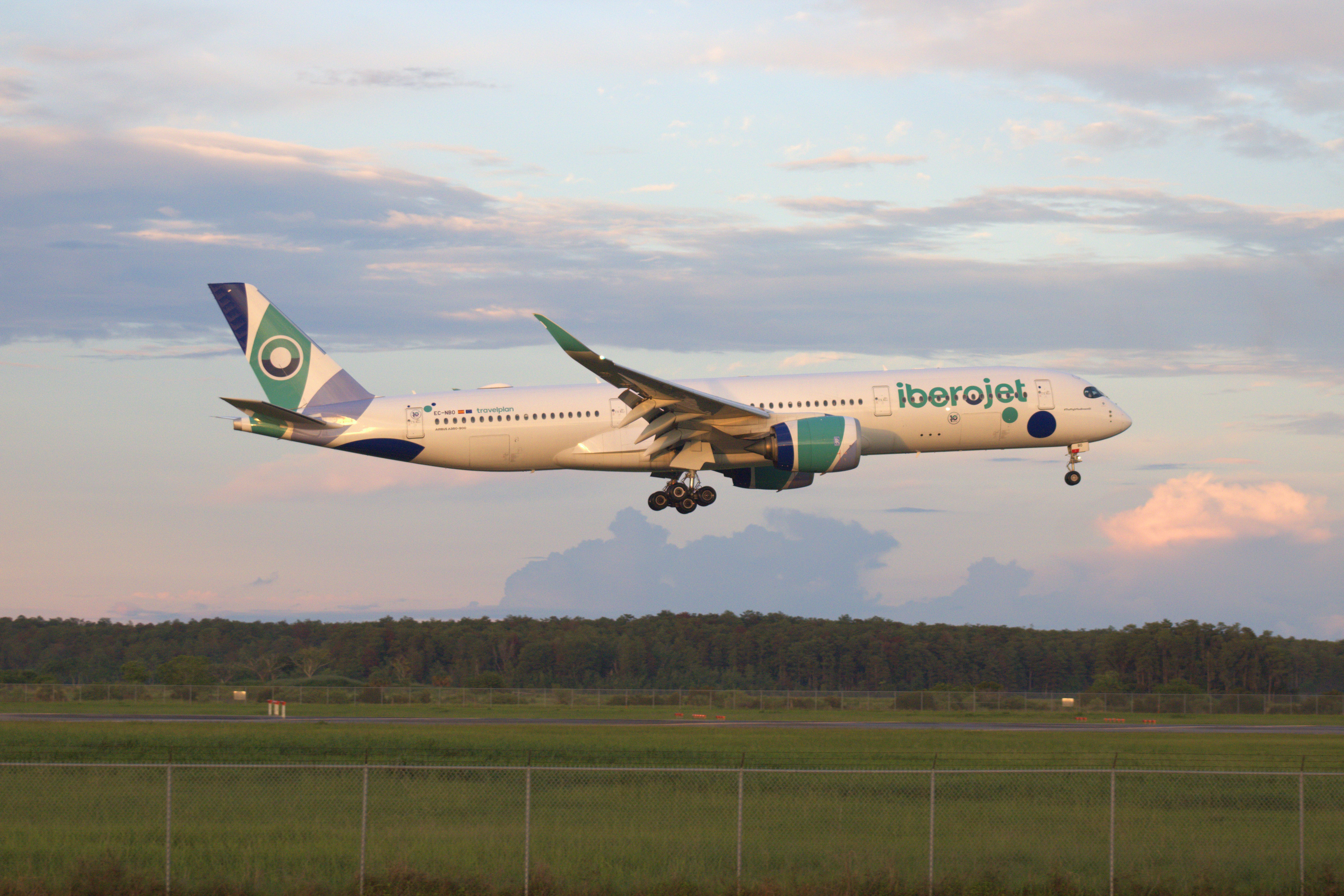
Iberojet A350-900 landing at Orlando International Airport in June 2024, concluding the airline's first scheduled flight to the United States

As of December 2025, Iberojet serves the following destinations:

Country	City	Airport name	Notes	Ref
Bulgaria	Varna	Varna Airport	Terminated	
Colombia	Bogotá	El Dorado International Airport		
Costa Rica	San José	Juan Santamaría International Airport		
Cuba	Havana	José Martí International Airport	Terminated	
Cuba	Santa Clara	Abel Santamaría Airport	Terminated	
Cuba	Varadero	Juan Gualberto Gómez Airport	Terminated	
Dominican Republic	Punta Cana	Punta Cana International Airport		
Honduras	Tegucigalpa	Comayagua International Airport		
Mauritius	Port Louis	Sir Seewoosagur Ramgoolam International Airport	Seasonal	
Mexico	Cancun	Cancún International Airport		
Mexico	Querétaro	Querétaro Intercontinental Airport		
Mexico	San José del Cabo	Los Cabos International Airport	Terminated	
Panama	Panama City	Tocumen International Airport		
Portugal	Lisbon	Lisbon Airport	Base	
Portugal	Porto	Porto Airport		
Spain	Barcelona	Josep Tarradellas Barcelona–El Prat Airport	Seasonal	
Spain	Madrid	Madrid–Barajas Airport	Base	
Thailand	Bangkok	Suvarnabhumi Airport	Seasonal	
United States	Orlando	Orlando International Airport	Terminated	
Uzbekistan	Tashkent	Islam Karimov Tashkent International Airport	Terminated	
Uzbekistan	Urgench	Urgench International Airport	Terminated	

=== Airline partnerships ===
Iberojet currently has a Interline agreement with Air Europa.

== Fleet ==
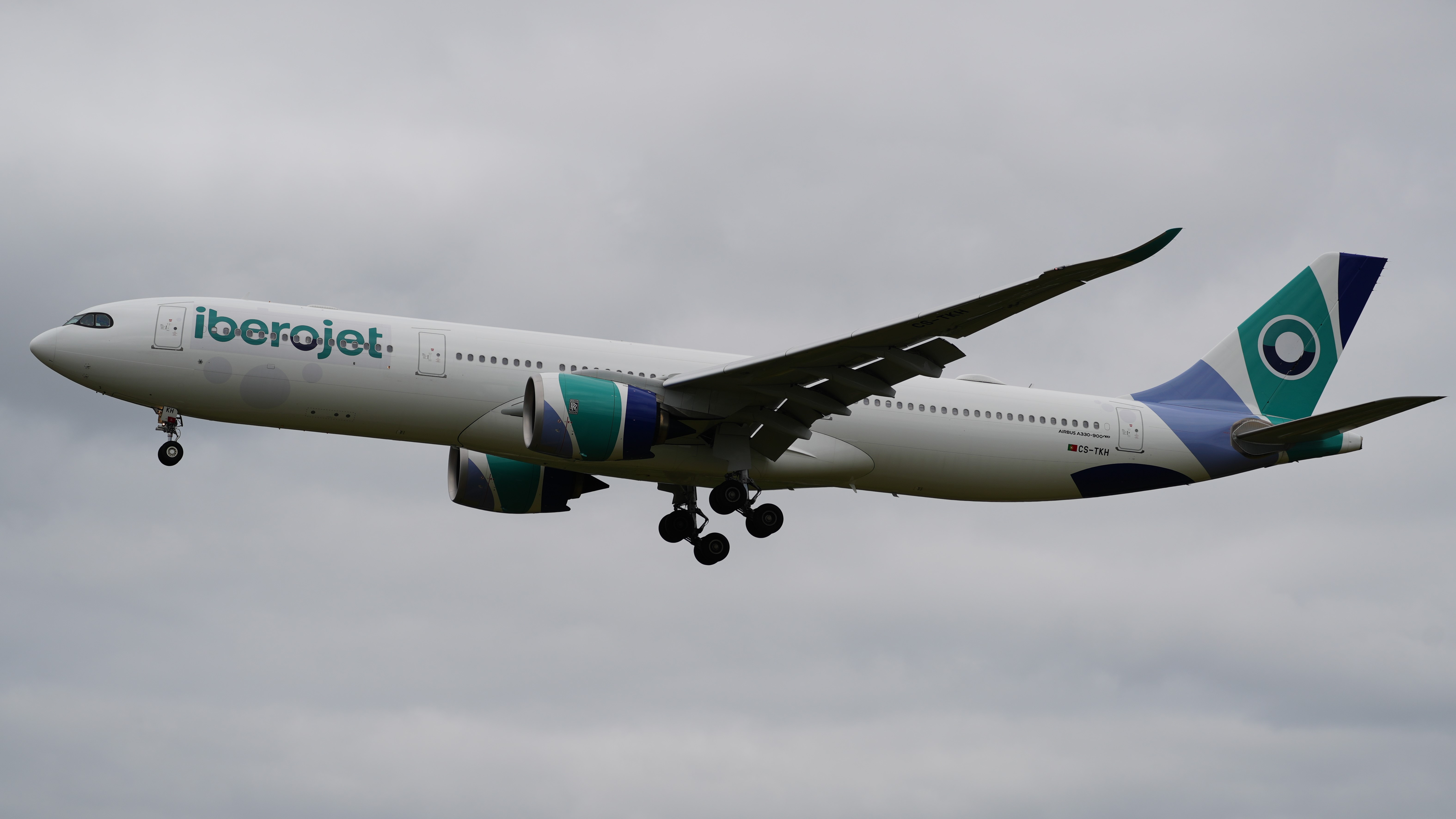
Iberojet Airbus A330-900

As of December 2025, Iberojet operates an all-Airbus fleet consisting of the following aircraft:

Iberojet fleet
Aircraft	In service	Orders	Passengers			Notes
Aircraft	In service	Orders	J	Y	Total	Notes
Airbus A320-200	1	—	—	180	180	
Airbus A330-300	2	—	—	388	388	
Airbus A330-900	2	—	32	356	388	
Airbus A350-900	2	—	32	400	432	
Total	7	—				
