= Jasmin Airways =

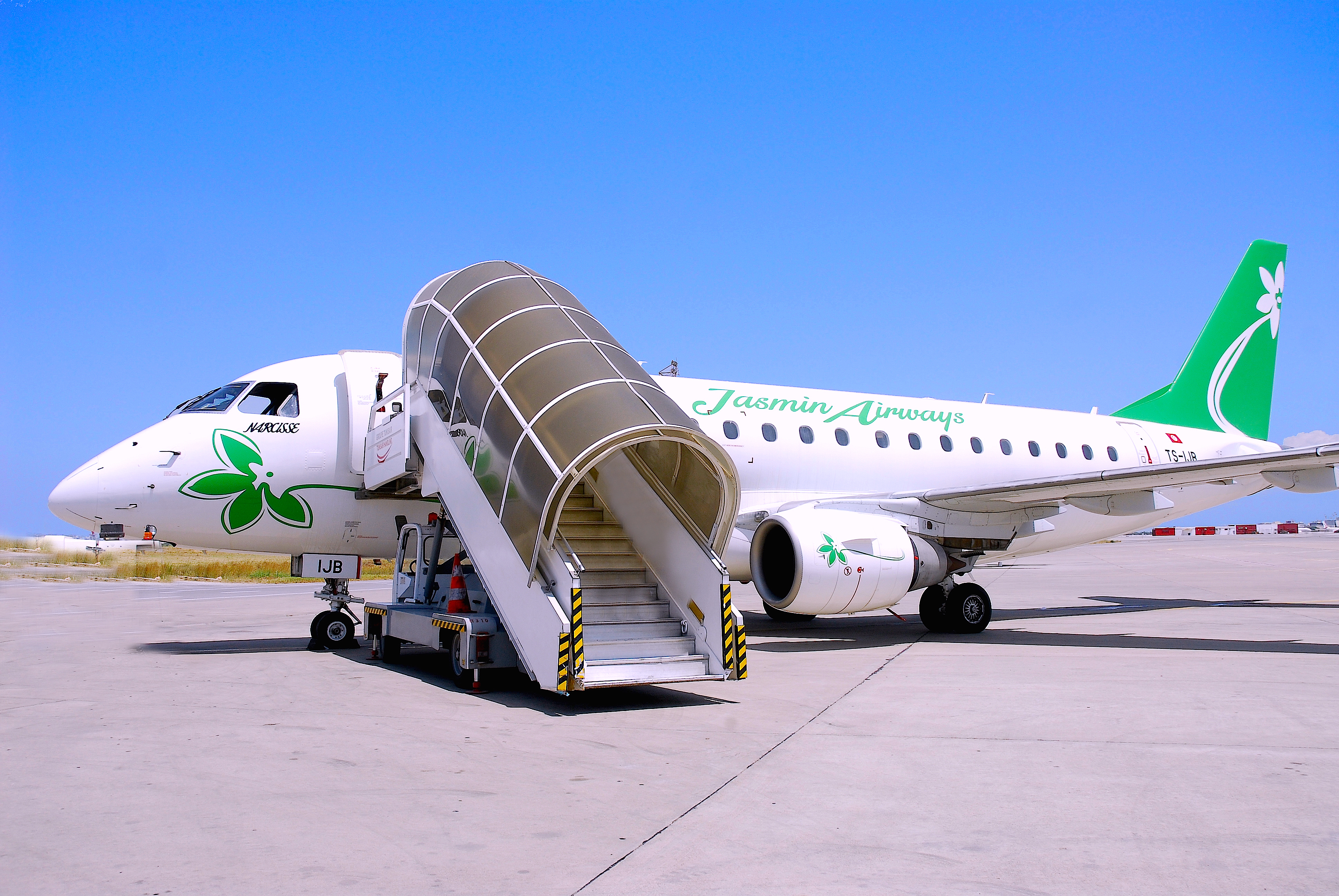
IATA	ICAO	Call sign
JO	JAW	JASMIN
- Commenced operations: December 20, 2019
- Ceased operations: November 22, 2020
- Hubs: Enfidha–Hammamet International Airport
- Fleet size: 20
- Destinations: 18
- Headquarters: Tunis
- Website: http://www.jasmin-airways.com/

Jasmin Airways (Arabic : ياسمين للطيران) was a Tunisian charter airline founded in December 2019.

== History ==
In 2011, Abderrazek Ben Amara decided to create a specialized charter airline. A 2015 planned launch for the airline was aborted.

On December 5, 2019, the company received its air operator's certificate, allowing it to operate as an airline. The first flights began on December 20, 2019.

The company was part of a Tunisian group including Airline Flight Academy, a local flight school and Universite ESAT. The company has also partnered with Hasdrubal Hotel Group and Thalassa Travel Tunisia.

As of December 2019, its director is Ali Ben Amara.

The airline operated its last flight on 22 November 2020. As of October 2023, the airlines has started the liquidation process.

== Destinations ==
The company plans to provide flights from the Maghreb and Europe to airports like Enfida and Djerba. They also plan to support Tunisair Express' operations in Djerba and Tozeur.

Their first flight was on December 20, 2019, carrying Italian football club Hellas Verona to its game against the Tunisian Club Africain.

- Tunisia
  - Enfida-Hammamet International Airport (hub)
  - Djerba-Zarziz International Airport
  - Tunis-Carthage International Airport
  - Tozeur-Nefta International Airport

- Germany
  - Cologne
- Italy
  - Verona Villafranca Airport
  - Bologna Airport

== Fleet ==
Aircraft	in service	passengers
Embraer 170	2	76
