= One Airlines =

Chilean airline

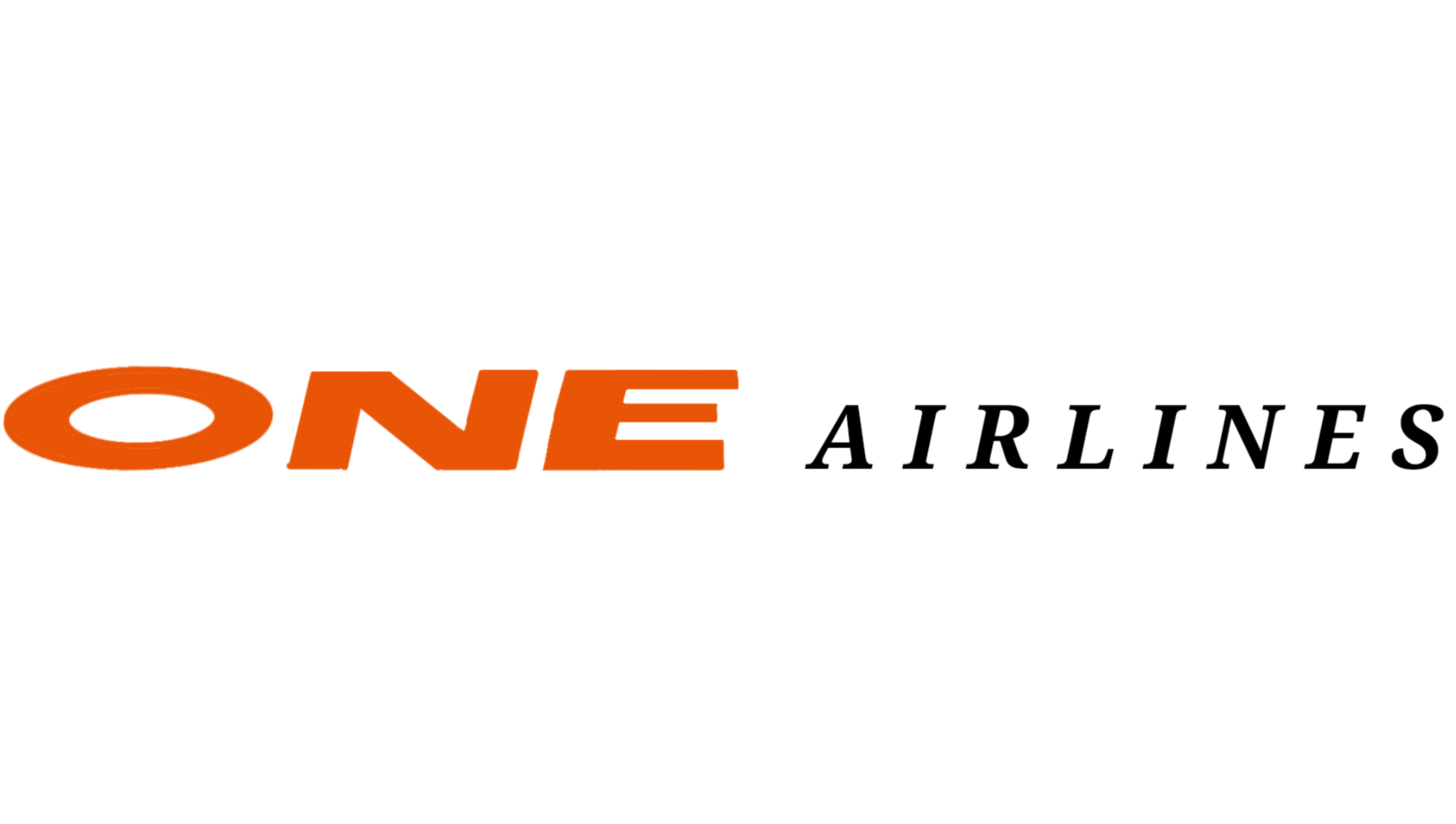
IATA	ICAO	Call sign
-	ONS	AIR DREAMS
- Founded: 2013
- Ceased operations: June 24, 2020
- Hubs: Arturo Merino Benítez International Airport
- Fleet size: 2
- Destinations: 4
- Headquarters: Santiago, Chile
- Website: oneaircharter.com

One Airlines was a Chilean airline that provided air transportation for passengers and regular charters for mining, since October 2013. Initially they used a fleet of two Boeing 737-400s, operated by Xtra Airlines. It was in a semi-operational state, flying for mining operations in northern Chile, operating with a single 737-300 leased from GECAS. It had its headquarters established in the Arturo Merino Benítez International Airport in Santiago de Chile. On June 24, 2020, the airline ceased all operations.

== History ==
Founded in July 2013 One Airlines is a Chilean airline providing air transportation services and charter passenger Sinami since 2013 . The operations center is located in the Arturo Merino Benítez International Airport in Santiago de Chile.

The airline announced on June 24, 2020, that it has ceased operations due to the hard financial situation caused by the COVID-19 crisis. The owner and Chairman, Claudio Fischer Llop, blamed the competition from SKY, JetSMART, and LATAM, which are offering charters at prices that ONE cannot compete with, and the lack of financial support from the Chilean government, making ONE’s operation non-viable during the present and near future.

== Destinations ==
City	Airport code		Airport	Notes
City	IATA	ICAO	Airport	Notes
Chile
Antofagasta	ANF	SCFA	Andrés Sabella Gálvez International Airport	
Calama	CJC	SCCF	El Loa Airport	
Concepción	CCP	SCIE	Carriel Sur International Airport	
Santiago de Chile	SCL	SCEL	Arturo Merino Benítez International Airport	HUB

== Fleet ==
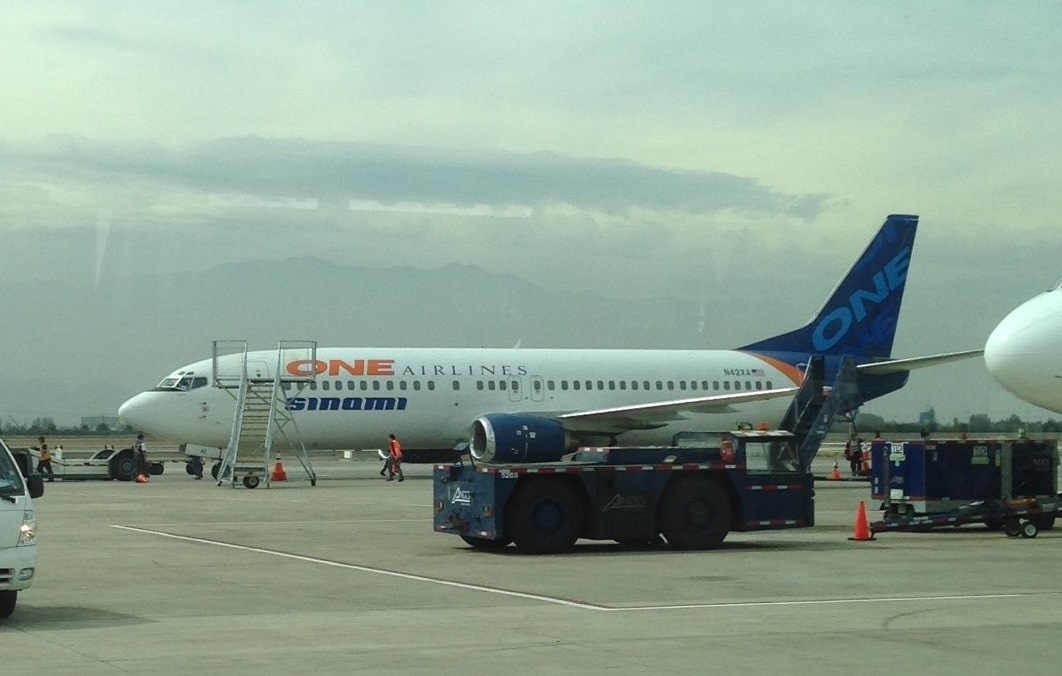
A One Airlines 737-300 aircraft parking in Santiago Airport

=== Current fleet ===
The One Airlines fleet consists of the following aircraft (as of August 2019):

One Airlines fleet
Aircraft	Total	Passengers	Notes
Boeing 737-300	2	140	

=== Former fleet ===
The airline previously operated the following aircraft:

- 2 Boeing 737-400
