= Orizonia Corporation =

Spanish tour operator

The Orizonia logo.

The Orizonia Group (Orizonia Corporaciόn in Spanish) was a Spanish tour operator which was founded in 2006. The company was based on the Spanish island of Mallorca, in the Mediterranean Sea. It was the third largest tour operator in Spain.

== Background ==
The Orizonia Group was born out of Grupo Iberostar, a Spanish tourism group split into three divisions: Iberostar Hotels and Resorts; Grupo Receptor; and Grupo Emisor. Iberostar Hotels and Resorts owned the accommodation service for the company while Grupo Receptor owned travel agencies and Grupo Emisor owned tour operators, a cruise line, retail travel agencies and airlines.

In 2006 the owner of Grupo Iberostar, Miguel Fluxà, decided to sell Grupo Receptor and Grupo Emisor, while keeping Iberostar Hotels. The sale price was in excess of Euro 800 million=. In March 2006, Fluxá had 12 offers for Grupo Receptor and Emisor and in July a deal was confirmed. The Carlyle Group from the United Kingdom took 55%, Vista Capital from Spain bought 36% while ICG Equity Fund purchased 5% and ten managers of the company acquired the remaining 4%.

In 2007, their first full year of trading, Orizonia reported a turnover of Euro 2.676 billion which was an increase of 11.4% over 2006 (Euro 2.402 billion).

In February 2013, Orizonia applied for "Pre-concurso de acreedores", a type of bankruptcy to protect itself from creditors, and communicated to its workers that it was ceasing operations. With this type of ¨bankruptcy¨ more than 5000 workers were fired without paying settlements and salaries and more than Euro 900 million in debts to the suppliers.

== Companies ==
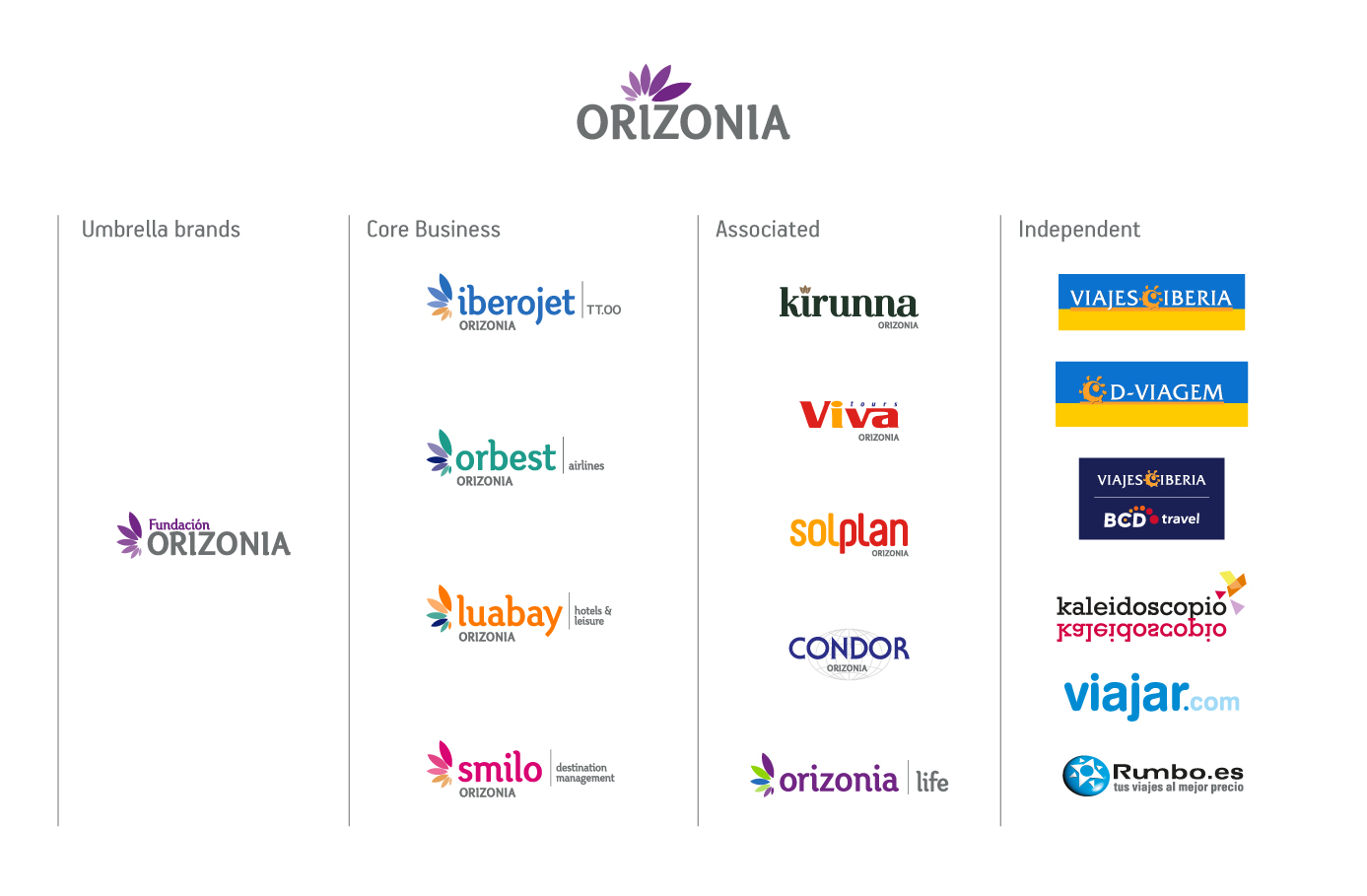
The Orizonia's architecture before its collapse

The Orizonia Group took ownership of several travel agencies; tour operator Iberojet; retail travel agencies Viajes Iberia and Quo Viajes; two airlines called Orbest and Orbest Orizonia Airlines, the first one based in Portugal; among others. The company was a major stakeholder in Ibero Cruises, which owned in conjunction with Carnival Corporation & plc, and which replaced its own cruise line Iberojet Cruceros in 2007.
