= Azur Air (Germany) =

German leisure airline

- Boeing 767-300ER
IATA	ICAO	Call sign
UR	ARZ	BLUE EAGLE
- Founded: May 1, 2016
- Commenced operations: 4 July 2017
- Ceased operations: 26 September 2018
- Focus cities: Düsseldorf Airport
- Fleet size: 3
- Destinations: 8
- Parent company: Anex Tourism Group
- Headquarters: Düsseldorf, Germany
- Key people: Alper Altun, General Director
- Website: azurair.de

Azurair GmbH, trading as Azur Air or Azur Air Germany, was a German leisure airline headquartered in Düsseldorf. It was founded in 2016 by Turkish-Dutch tour operator Anex Tourism Group as part of an expansion into the German leisure market and ceased operations in September 2018.

== History ==
=== Early developments ===
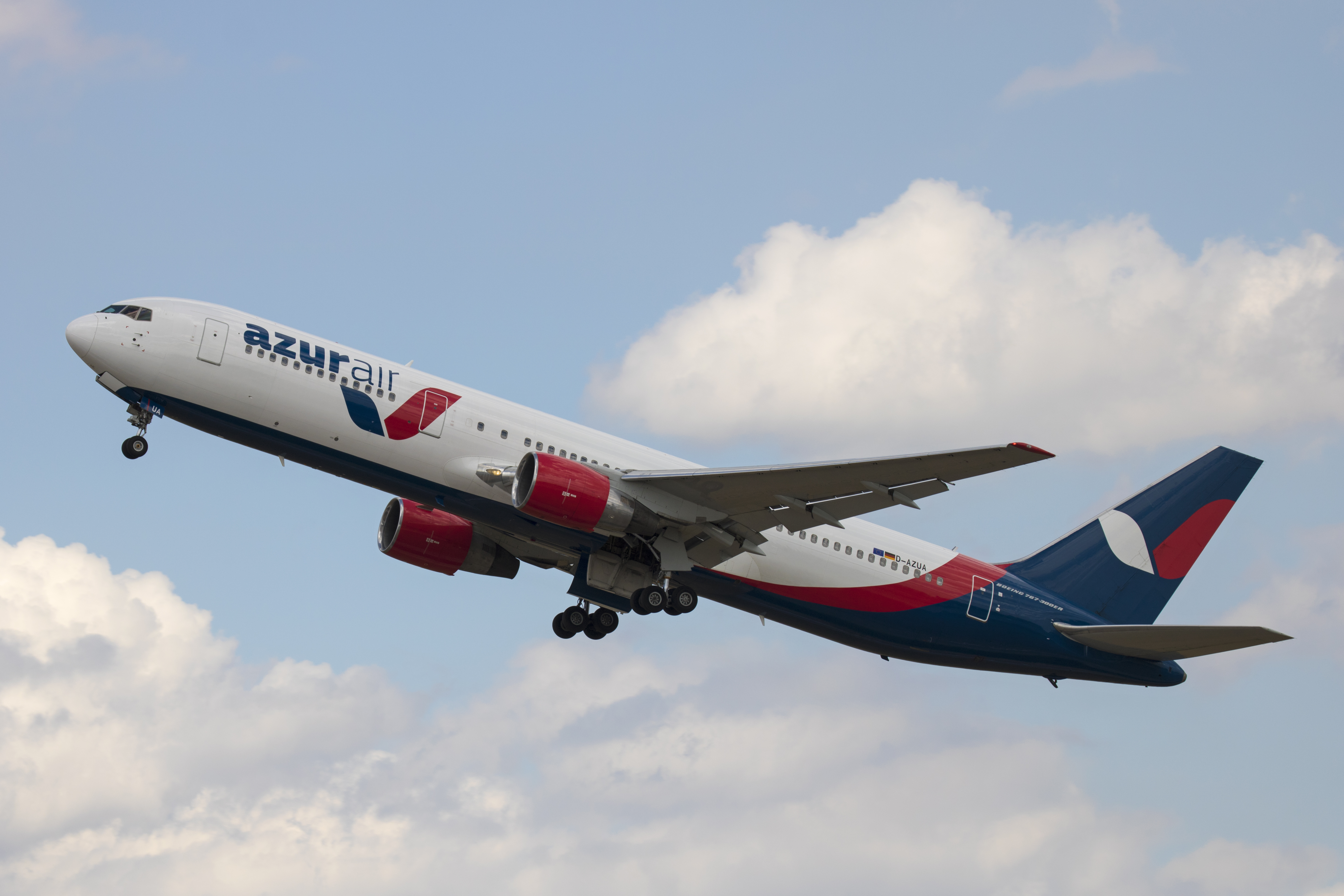
Former Azur Air Germany Boeing 767-300ER later operated for its sister company Azur Air Ukraine

In mid 2016, Anex Tourism Group, yet engaged especially in Russian leisure market and operating airlines both in Russia (Azur Air) und Ukraine (Azur Air Ukraine), founded a German subsidiary in Düsseldorf and started distribution for 2017 travel season in late 2016. The AOC for its German carrier was requested simultaneously. First flights are scheduled to start in April 2017. Beside its home base at Düsseldorf Airport, where the fleet will also be maintained, Azur Air planned to operate from Berlin-Schönefeld and Munich. At the beginning, Azur Air flew to Mediterranean destinations and the Caribbean for Anex Tour only.

At first, Azur Air was to receive three Boeing 767-300ER from sister company Azur Air from Russia. The fleet was planned to be enhanced by Boeing 737 and 757s later on while destination network would be expanded. Operations were firstly planned to start in spring 2017, but have been shifted towards summer 2017. Azur Air then received its AOC and commenced operations a few days later on 4 July.

During summer 2017, Azur Air announced it would increase its long-haul operations by offering more flights to Punta Cana from its existing departure airports Berlin-Schönefeld and Düsseldorf as well as starting the destination from several more German cities such as Hannover.

=== Demise ===
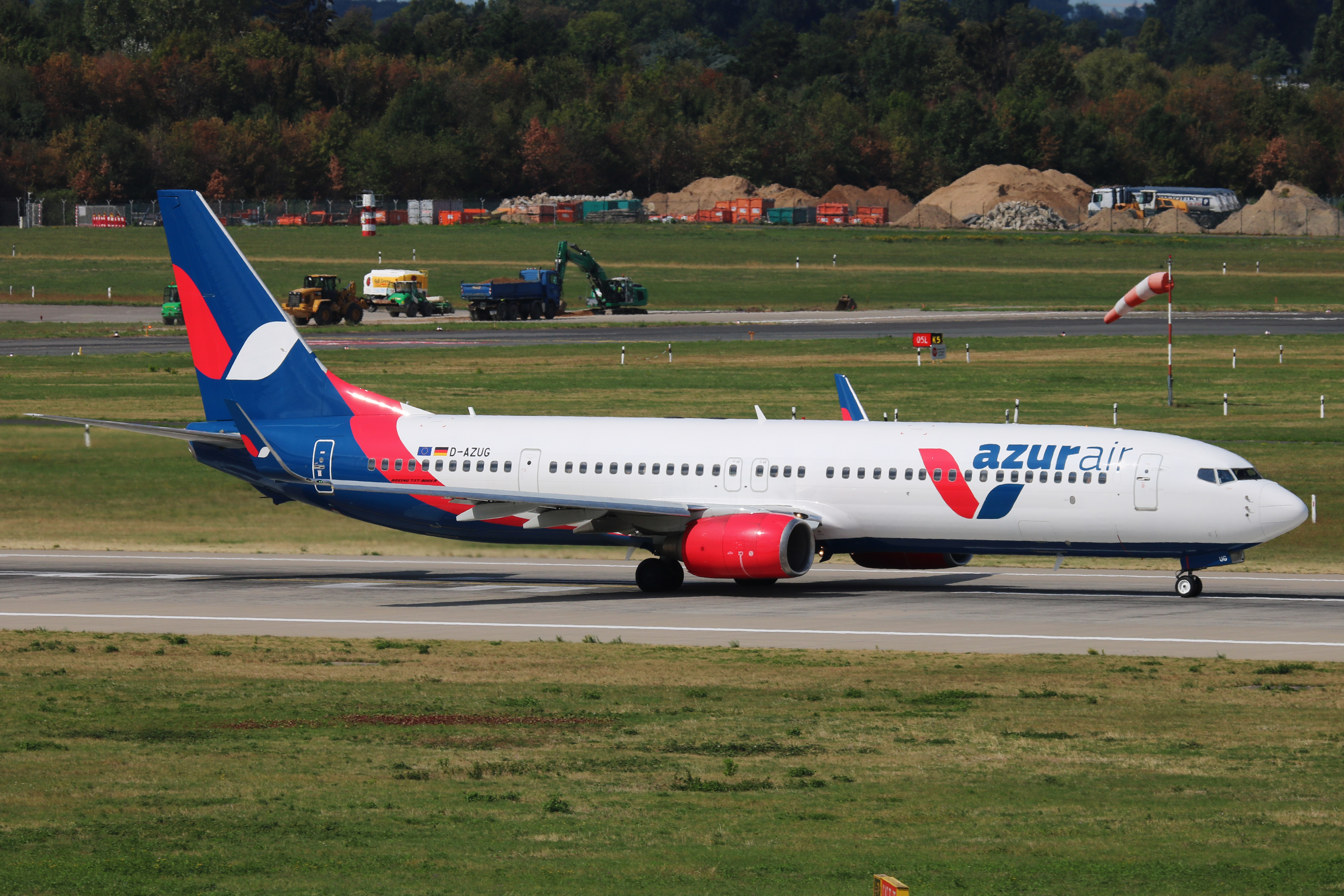
Boeing 737-900 at Düsseldorf on 1 September 2018

In March 2018, Azur Air announced it would replace two of its three Boeing 767-300ER, which were handed to sister company Azur Air Ukraine, by two smaller Boeing 737-900s.

In July 2018, Azur Air Germany announced major changes to its operations due to insufficient business figures. While the last remaining Boeing 767, which was then already leased out to Azur Air Ukraine, was to be transferred to Azur Air in Russia by October 2018, Azur Air Germany was to continue its operations with only one remaining aircraft without any long-haul services. In the same time, the entire station in Berlin was to be shut down, laying off 90 staff.

In September 2018, Azur Air Germany sparked controversy amongst its employees after the relocation of its sole remaining aircraft to other operations while the flights from Germany have been taken over by leasing contractors on short notice. On 26 September 2018, it has been announced that the airline ceased all operations with immediate effect and will be dissolved due to a negative business outlook. Prior to this, the owners tried to sell the airline's operational license without success.

== Destinations ==
As of August 2018, Azur Air (Germany) served the following destinations:

City	Country	Airport	Notes
Antalya	Turkey	Antalya Airport	Seasonal charter
Amsterdam	Netherlands	Schiphol	For Transavia
Bangkok	Thailand	Don Mueang International Airport	Seasonal charter
Berlin	Germany	Berlin Schönefeld Airport	Seasonal charter
Düsseldorf	Germany	Düsseldorf Airport	Base
Enfidha	Tunisia	Enfidha–Hammamet International Airport	Seasonal charter
Hannover	Germany	Hannover Airport	Seasonal charter
Hurghada	Egypt	Hurghada International Airport	Charter
Munich	Germany	Munich Airport	Seasonal charter
Palma de Mallorca	Spain	Palma de Mallorca Airport	Seasonal charter

== Fleet ==
The Azur Air (Germany) fleet consisted of the following aircraft as of September 2018:

Aircraft type	In service	Passengers	Remarks
Boeing 737-900ER	2	215	all leased
Boeing 767-300ER	1	334	all leased
Total	3		

== See also ==
- Azur Air
- Azur Air Ukraine
