= Orbest Orizonia Airlines =

Spanish airline, 1998–2013

Orbest Orizonia
IATA	ICAO	Call sign
TY	IWD	IBERWORLD
- Founded: 1998 (as Iberworld)
- Commenced operations: 11 April 1998
- Ceased operations: 5 May 2013
- Operating bases: Madrid; Palma de Mallorca
- Fleet size: 9
- Destinations: 89 (as of 4 November 2009)
- Parent company: Orizonia Group
- Headquarters: Palma de Mallorca, Spain
- Key people: Gabriel Subias Cano (CEO)
- Website: Official website

Orbest Orizonia Airlines, S.A., formerly Iberworld Airlines, S.A., was an airline with its head office in the Edificio Orizionia Corporación in Palma de Mallorca, Spain. It operated regular and charter flights to destinations in Europe and the Caribbean, scheduled domestic services, and scheduled international services to Havana. In its 14-year history, Orbest Orizonia flew to four continents and operated routes to over 30 countries. Its main base was Palma de Mallorca Airport. Orbest Orizonia was the air division of the Orizonia Group, Spain's third largest tour operator.

== History ==
Former Iberworld logo used between 2008 and 2011

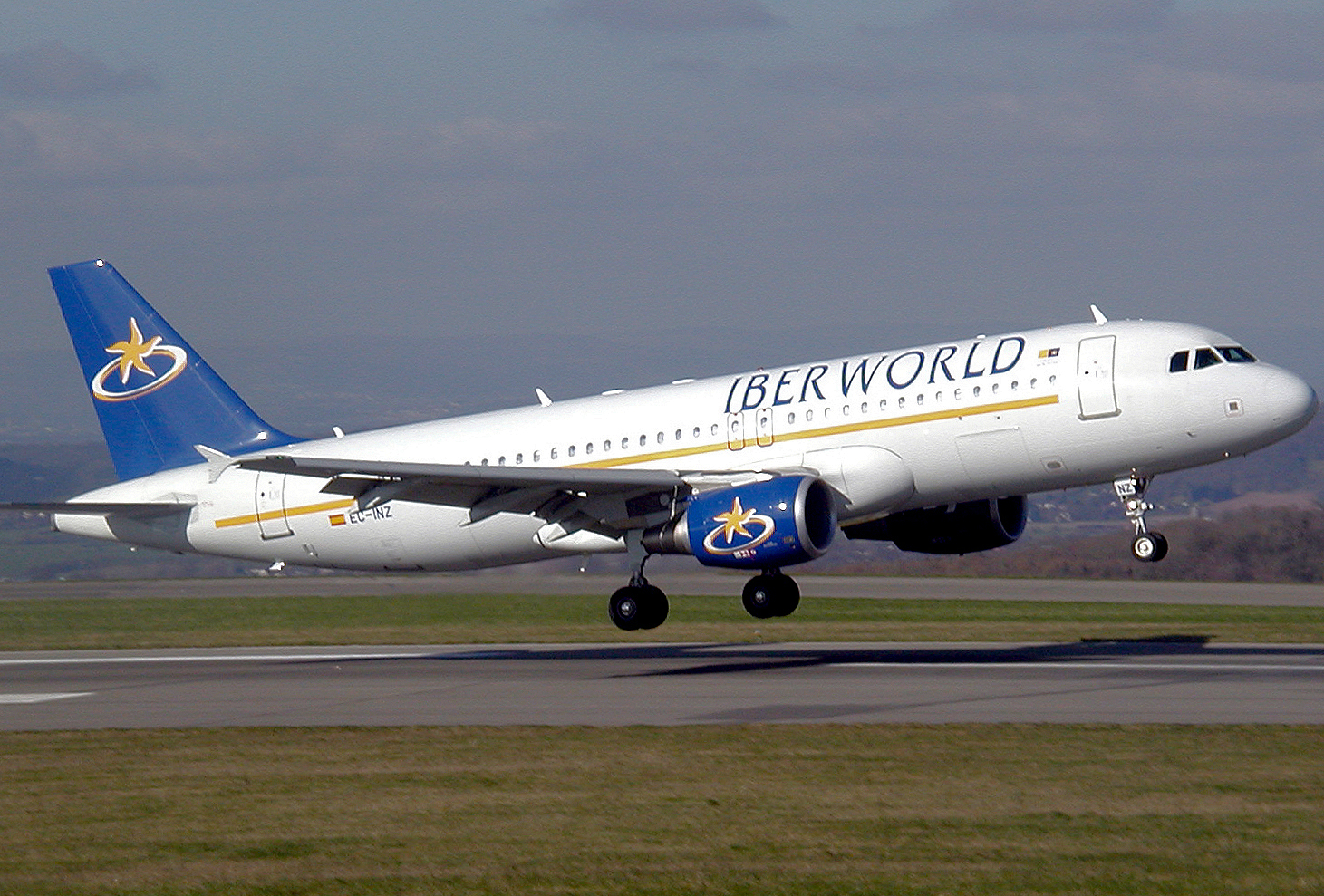
Iberworld Airbus A320-200 in the original livery, at Bristol International Airport, England

=== Iberworld ===
Following the failure of BCM Airlines, Iberworld was founded by Iberostar, a Spanish tourist company, who wholly owned the new airline. Grupo Iberostar already owned a tour operator, Holiday resorts and hotels, and saw that buying BCM would be a quick way to acquire an airline. The airline was established in 1998 and started operations on 11 April 1998 with a single Lockheed L-1011 Tristar leased from Classic Airways of the United Kingdom. The L-1011 was used on routes from Palma de Mallorca and Málaga to London. The next day, on 12 April 1998, the first Airbus A320-200 was delivered and it started services to complement the Tristar. By 5 May, a second A320-200 had been delivered and as the end of spring approached, they returned the L-1011 to Classic Airways. By the end of the year, however, Iberworld received two new A320 aircraft from Airbus, allowing them to make a 23.6 million Euro profit in eight months from carrying over 263,000 passengers.

In February 1999, the airline took delivery of their first wide-body aircraft – an Airbus A310 – 300 from Transavia. Later that year, it received its fifth A320 and placed an order for two more of the type. 1999 was Iberworld's first full year of flying and passenger figures rose to over one million, the growth being so considerable due to the gap in the market left by Viva Air (which stopped operations in March 1999). This airline closure allowed Iberworld to open new routes to the Caribbean. In 2000, Iberworld's growth was more modest, with passenger figures rising to 1.1 million with no new aircraft arriving. Iberworld then placed their first order for a new wide-body in July 2001, an Airbus A330-200 to serve its long-haul destinations. Later that same year, the two A320s on order arrived; however, due to the 11 September attacks on the World Trade Center in New York, passenger numbers remained around the same as the previous year.

In mid-April 2002, the Airbus A330-200 (registered EC-IDB) arrived with seating capacity for 51 Premium passengers and 287 Economy passengers. This acquisition allowed Iberworld to retire the ageing A310-300 in October 2002.

In 2006, Grupo Iberostar decided to sell the airline and other parts of Iberostar for 800 million Euros while keeping the hotels and resorts. Iberworld, together with former Iberostar's tour operators, and Viajes Iberia became the new Orizonia Group owned by the UK's Carlyle Group (55%), Spain's Vista Capital (36%), the ICG Equity Fund (5%) and ten of the company's managers (4%). Later that same year, Iberworld carried over two million passengers, a major milestone in the airline's history.

Iberworld took delivery of three A330-300 series aircraft, the larger A330 variant, another A320-200 (from Iberia) and leased the A330-200 to their Portuguese subsidiary Orbest. The modernized Airbus fleet of seven A320-200s, one A330-200 (leased to Orbest) and three A330-300s allowed Iberworld to report a profit every year since inception in 1998. In 2008, the Iberworld fleet paint scheme was changed to a new design deemed more appealing and eye-catching.

=== Orbest Orizonia ===
On 1 May 2011, the airline was rebranded and changed its name to Orbest Orizonia.

Orbest Orizonia acceded to judicial protection on 15 February 2013, due to problems in its fusion with the Globalia Group, parent for Air Europa. On 28 February 2013, it was announced publicly that the Spanish travel agency group Viajes Barceló would buy the airline Orbest along with another travel agent chain called Vibo. Orbest previously employed over 800 employees but with this new deal by the Barceló group, the intention was to employ even more people, just over 900 employees. The airline declared bankruptcy on 5 May 2013 and ceased all operations subsequently.

== Fleet ==
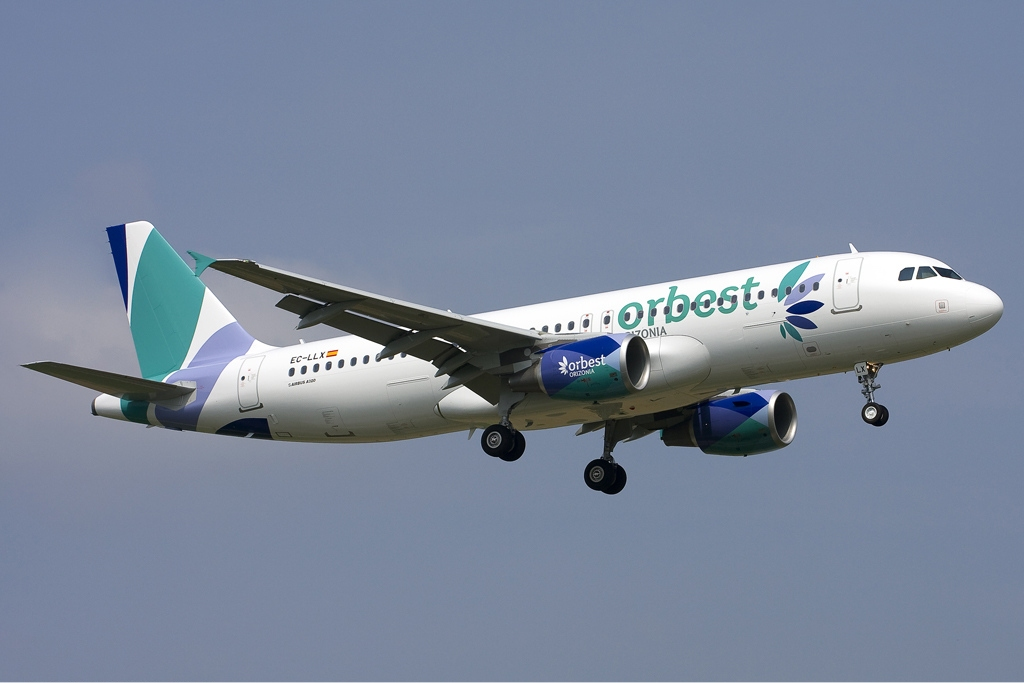
Orbest Orizonia Airlines Airbus A320 in latter livery

By the time of ceasing operations, the Orbest Orizonia fleet consisted of the following aircraft:

Orbest Orizonia Airlines fleet
Aircraft	In fleet	Orders	Passengers	Notes
Airbus A320-200	3	0	180	
Airbus A320neo	0	1	180	To be delivered in 2017; cancelled due to the Orizonia Group collapse
Airbus A330-200	1	0	314	
Airbus A330-300	2	0	358	
Airbus A350-900	0	2	368	To be delivered in 2015; cancelled due to Orizonia Group collapse
Total	6	3		

== See also ==
- World2Fly Spanish airline owned by Grupo Iberostar, of which Orbest Orizonia Airlines formed a part of
