= Bestair =

Airline based in Turkey

IATA	ICAO	Call sign
5F	BST	BARBIE
- Founded: 2006
- Ceased operations: October 2009
- Hubs: Atatürk International Airport; Antalya Airport
- Fleet size: 3
- Parent company: Best Havayollari
- Headquarters: Istanbul, Turkey
- Website: flybestair.com

Bestair (Bestair Havayollari) was a charter airline based in Yeşilköy, Istanbul, Turkey. It was a privately owned charter airline operating domestic and international services. Its main bases were Atatürk International Airport, Istanbul and Antalya Airport.

== History ==
The airline started operations on 17 June 2006. It was established by the Tunca Group (airline Chief Executive: Bahtisen Tunca).

Bestair ceased its operations in October 2009.

== Destinations ==
Bestair operated services linking Istanbul and Antalya with destinations in Germany, Belgium, Switzerland and the United Kingdom.

== Fleet ==
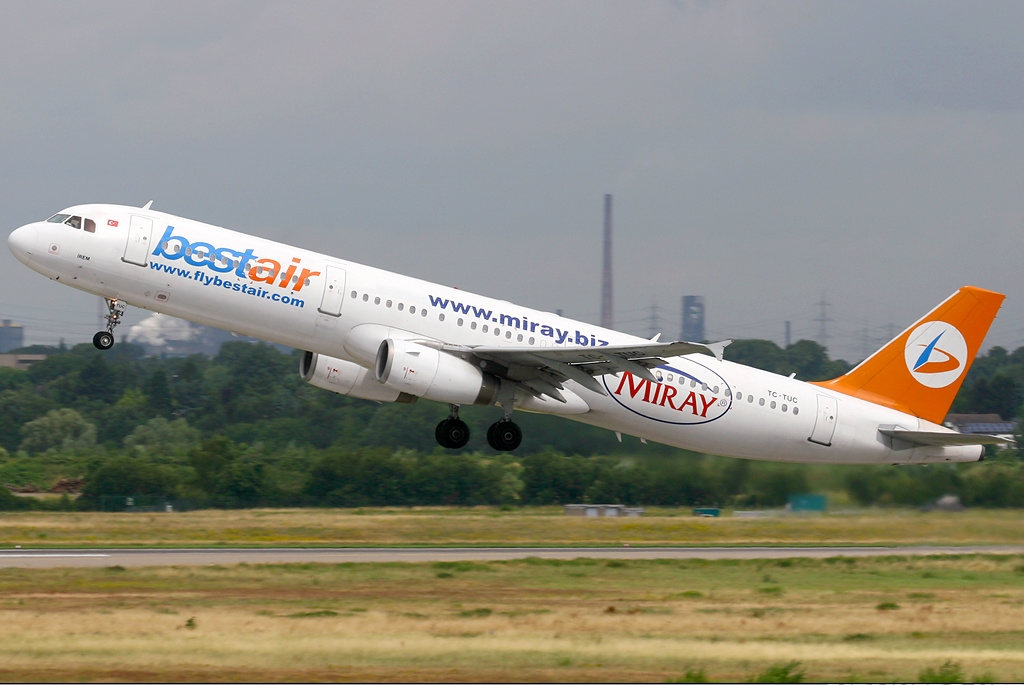
Best Air A321

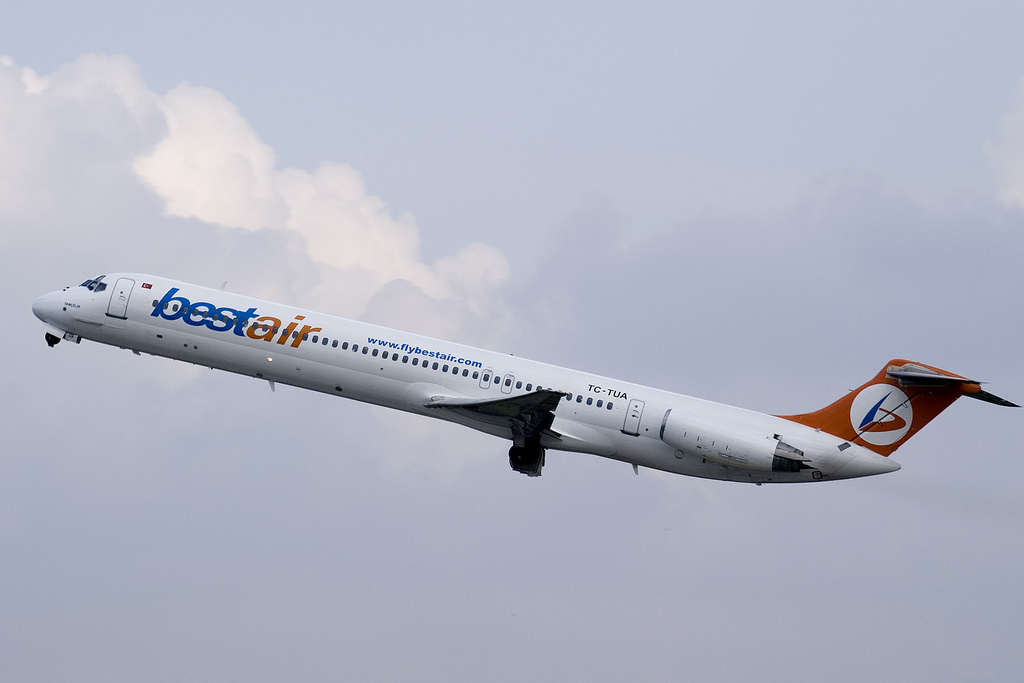
Best Air MD-82

The Bestair fleet included the following aircraft (as of 6 May 2009)

- 2 Airbus A321-131 (one aircraft was operated for Atlasjet)
- 1 McDonnell Douglas MD-82 (which was operated for Mahan Air)

== See also ==
- List of defunct airlines of Turkey
