= Orbest =

Portuguese charter airline

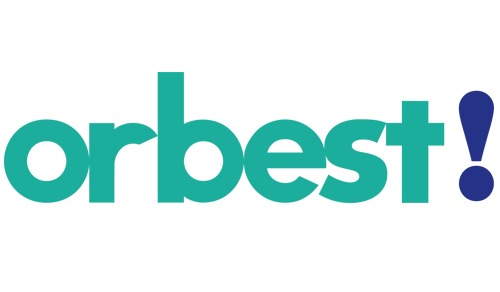
IATA	ICAO	Call sign
6O	OBS	ORBEST
- Founded: 2007; 19 years ago
- AOC #: PT-01/07
- Operating bases: Lisbon Airport
- Fleet size: 2
- Destinations: see Iberojet destinations
- Parent company: Barceló Group
- Headquarters: Lisbon, Portugal
- Website: orbest.com

Orbest, S.A. is a Portuguese charter airline headquartered in Lisbon and based at Lisbon Airport. It operates scheduled and charter flights in short- and long-haul operations out of Portugal and Spain both on behalf of tour operators, and jointly with its Spanish sister company Iberojet.

== History ==
The company was set up in 2007 by the Orizonia Group. Orbest started operations with a single Airbus A330-200, registration CS-TRA. This aircraft remained with the airline until 2010, when the Orizonia Group announced an upgrade to a new and larger Airbus A330-300.

Following the collapse of the Orizonia Corporation, Orbest was purchased by the Barceló Group. The group also created a new airline under the name Evelop Airlines for operations in Spain, which received airplanes from both Orbest and the former Orbest Orizonia Airlines; all aircraft owned by Orbest were thereafter jointly operated by Evelop.

On 8 December 2020, Orbest merged with Evelop and the two companies operated under the Iberojet name. As of October 2025, Orbest operates under the Iberojet brand.

== Destinations ==
Orbest operates under the Iberojet name, and operates to destinations on behalf of them.

== Fleet ==
=== Current fleet ===
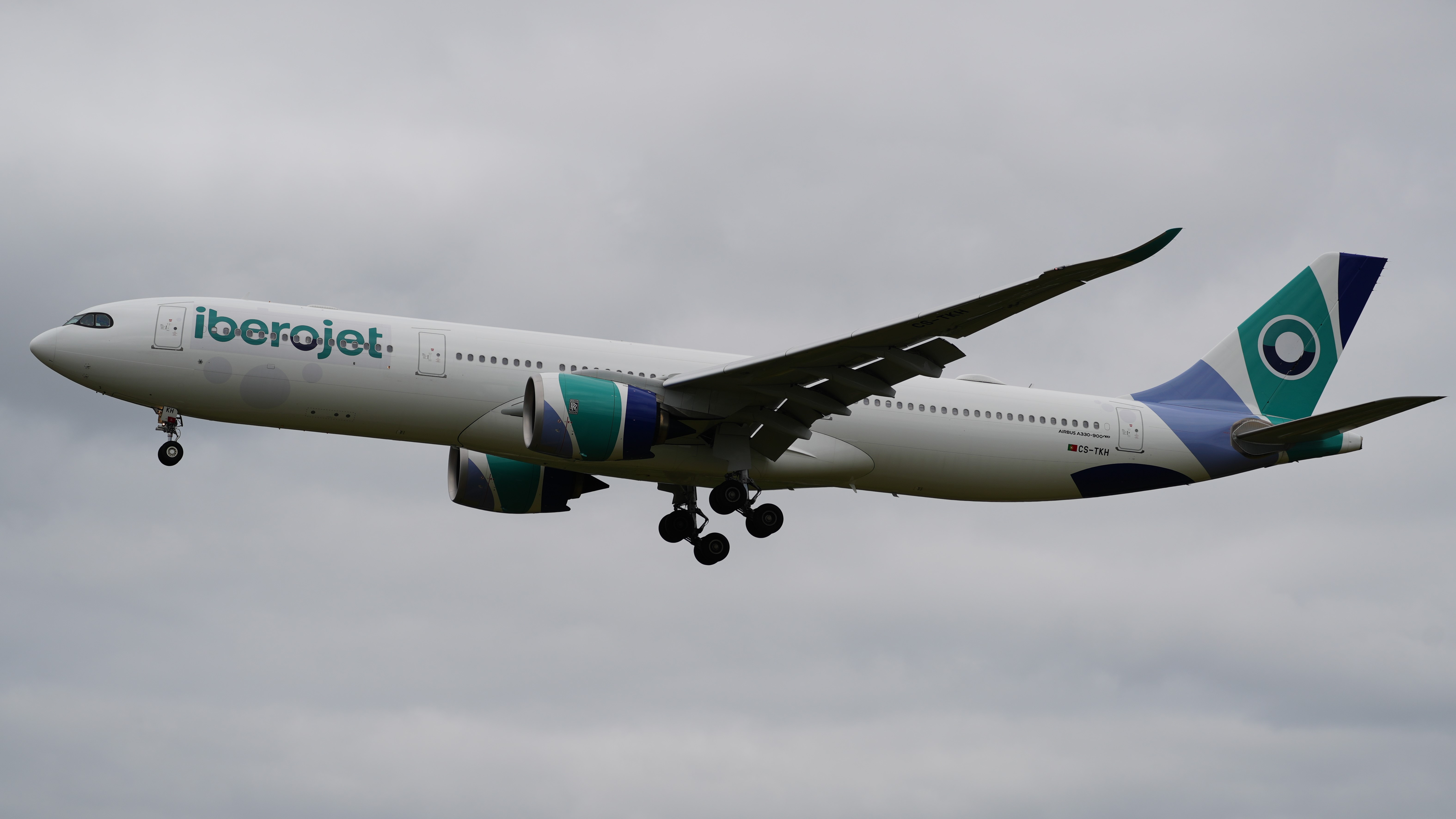
Orbest Airbus A330-900 in Iberojet livery

As of April 2024, Orbest operates the following aircraft under the Iberojet name:

Orbest Airlines fleet
Aircraft	In service	Orders	Passengers			Notes
Aircraft	In service	Orders	C	Y	Total	Notes
Airbus A330-900	2	—	32	356	388	Operated for Iberojet.
Total	2	—				

=== Historical fleet ===
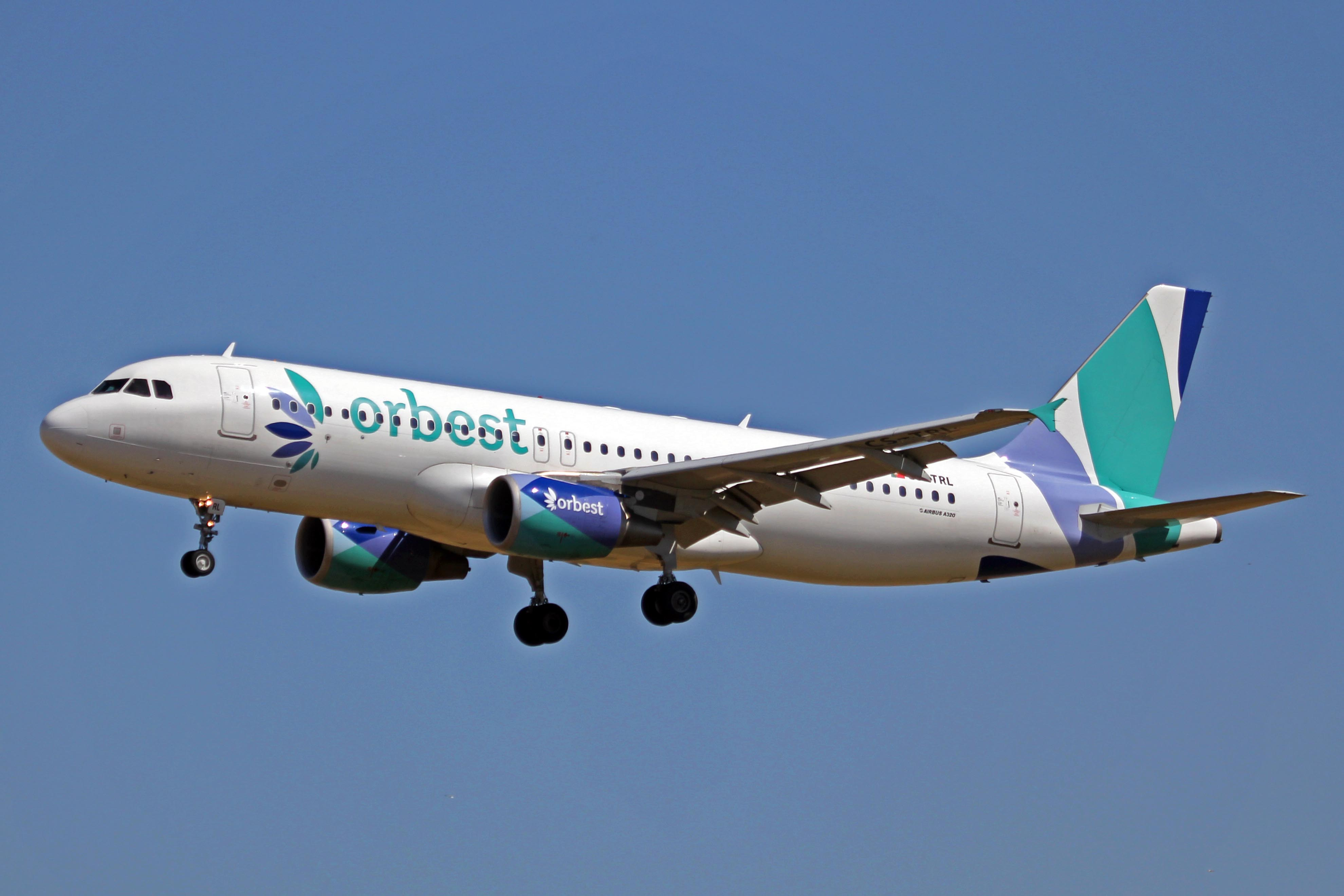
Orbest Airbus A320-200

Orbest previously operated the following aircraft:

Orbest former fleet
Aircraft	Total	Introduced	Retired	Notes
Airbus A320-200	3	2007	2021	1 transferred to Iberojet.
Airbus A330-200	2	2007	2010	Transferred to Orbest Orizonia Airlines.
Airbus A330-200	2	2015	2016	Transferred to Air Europa.
Airbus A330-300	1	2010	2023	Transferred to World2Fly.
