= Odessa Airlines =

Ukrainian charter airline

IATA	ICAO	Call sign
5K	ODS	ODESSA AIR
- Founded: 1996; 30 years ago
- Ceased operations: 2006; 20 years ago
- Fleet size: 3
- Headquarters: Odesa, Ukraine

Odessa Airlines was an airline based in Odesa, Ukraine. It operated charter passenger services from Ukraine to destinations in Russia, Syria, Turkey and Germany. It also carried out agricultural works. Its main base was Odesa International Airport.

== History ==
The airline was established and started operations in 1996. It was originally part of Aeroflot and separated into an independent organisation, State Aircompany Odessa Airlines, on 29 July 1996. On 20 August 2003, it changed the form of ownership and became Open Joint Stock Company Odessa Airlines. It ceased operations in 2006.

== Fleet ==
The Odessa Airlines fleet included the following aircraft (at March 2007):

- 3 Yakovlev Yak-40
