= Orca Air =

Airline based in Cairo, Egypt

- Orca Air Logo
IATA	ICAO	Call sign
4D	ORK	Orca Taxi
- Commenced operations: 1996
- Ceased operations: 2003
- Fleet size: See Fleet below
- Headquarters: Cairo, Egypt
- Key people: Diaa El-Gabbani and Osama Farid(Founders)
- Website: www.flyorcaair.com

Orca Air was a regional airline based in Cairo in Egypt which also provided air taxi and charter services. It was established in February 1996 and is a member of the European Regions Airline Association (ERA). It also provided air ambulance services. After suspending operations in 2003, the airline has yet to recommence operations.

== History ==
Orca Air was first founded in 1996 by Diaa El-Gabbani and Osama Farid and was the first air taxi service in the Middle East. But due to unexpected events such as the death of El-Gabbani in an air crash in 2000, then a slump in the tourism industry after September 11, 2001 and inadequate management, Orca Air's operations were suspended in 2003.

== Code data ==
- IATA Code: 4D
- ICAO Code: ORK
- Callsign: ORCA TAXI

== Fleet ==
Initially, the fleet was:

- 2 - DHC-8-300
- 2 - Metro 23s
- 1 - Beechcraft C-90B
