= Albatros Airways =

Albanian low-cost airline (2004–2006)

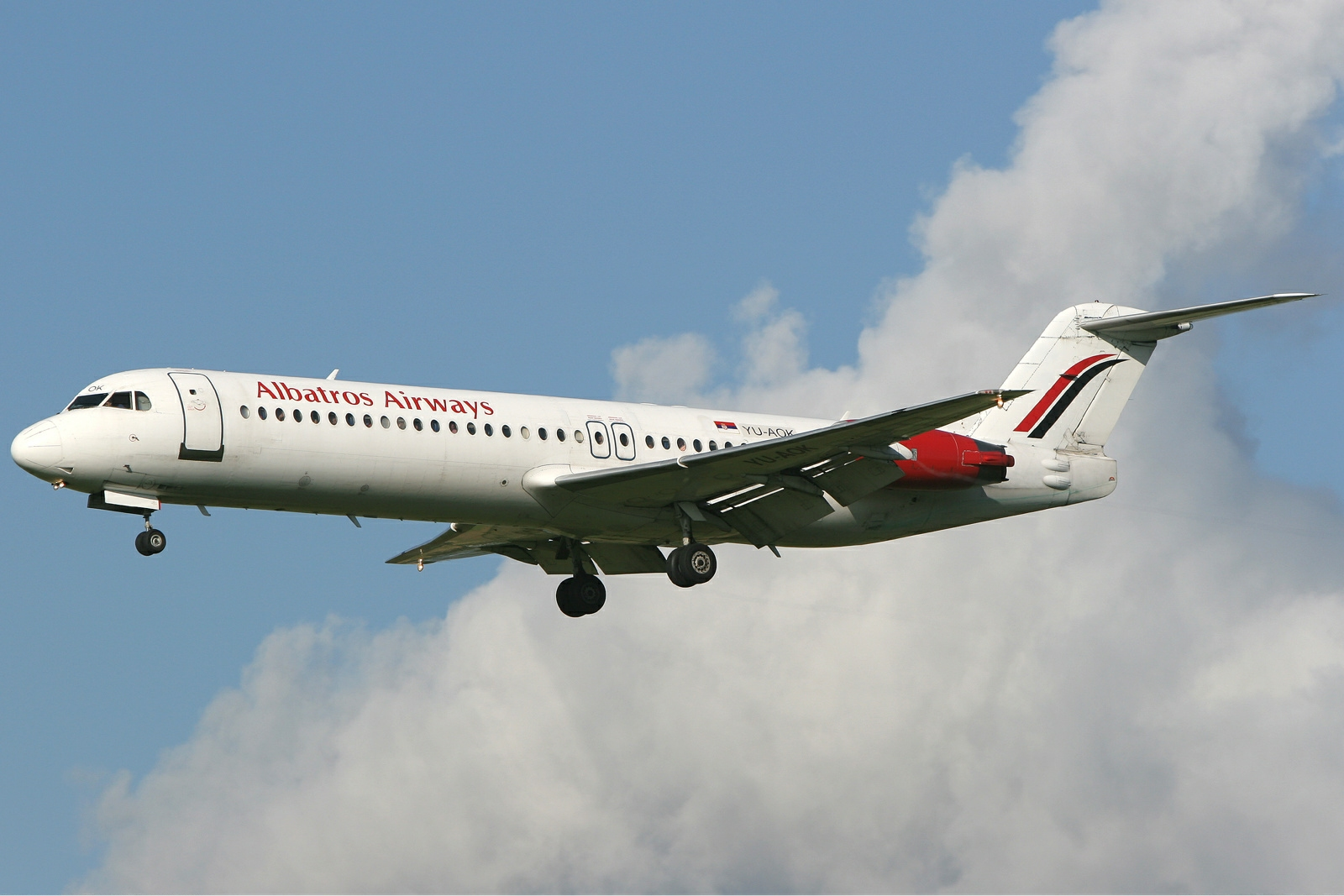
- Fokker 100
IATA	ICAO	Call sign
4H	LBW	ALBANWAYS
- Founded: 2004
- Ceased operations: 2006
- Hubs: Tirana International Airport Nënë Tereza
- Fleet size: 1
- Destinations: 8
- Headquarters: Tirana, Albania
- Key people: Albens Vokopola, Valer Hoxha, Aleksandër Hoxha, Tritan Anamali, Fatmir Prifti,

Albatros Airways Sh.p.k was a low-cost airline based in Tirana in Albania. It flew to destinations in Italy such as Genoa, Milan, Pescara, Pisa, Rimini, Venice, Verona, and in Turkey (Istanbul) using Fokker 100 aircraft. Its main base was Rinas Mother Teresa Airport (TIA), Tirana.

== History ==
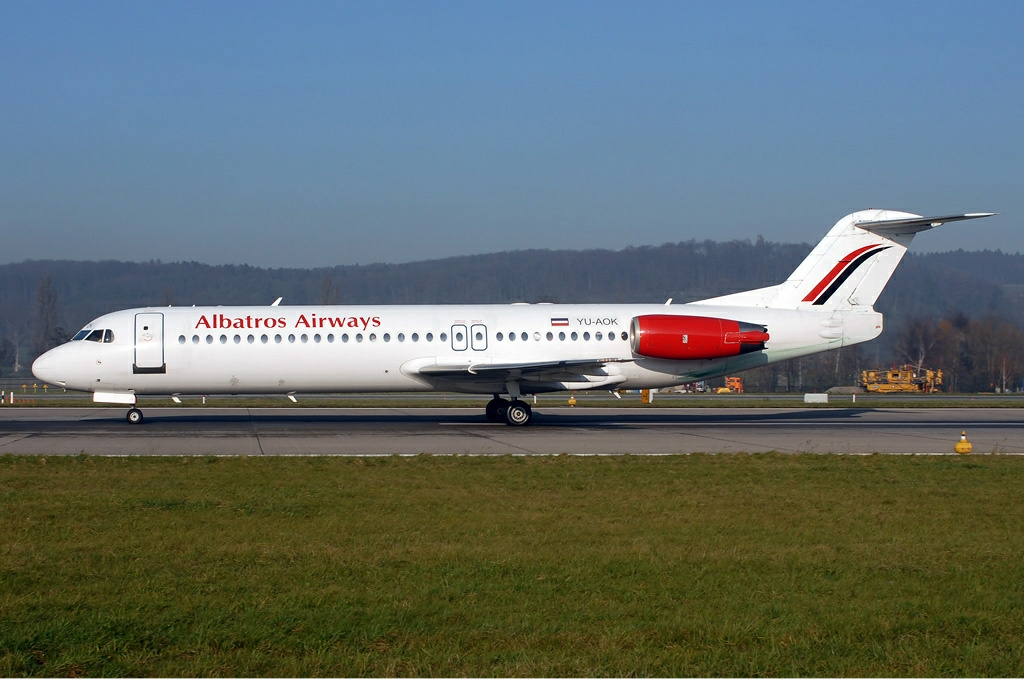
Fokker 100

The airline was established in 2004 and started operations on 3 November.

On 1 September 2006 the airline was grounded, only by a telephone call by the Albanian aviation authorities on 31 August 2006, because of unpaid airport and air traffic control fees, and, according to local media, it was advised to stop selling tickets. The grounding led to heated political debates. The opposition and the management accused the government of having acted against the airline violating the free market economy. On the other side the office of the President of Albania was accused of having favoured the air carrier.

== Destinations ==
These were the scheduled international destinations as of July 2006:

=== Domestic ===
Albania

- Tirana (Rinas Mother Teresa Airport) Hub

=== International ===
Italy

- Bari Airport
- Genoa Airport
- Bergamo Airport
- Pescara Airport
- Pisa Airport
- Rimini Airport
- Venice-Marco Polo Airport
- Verona Airport

== Fleet ==
As of August 2006 the Albatros Airways fleet includes:

- 1 Fokker 100 leased from Montenegro Airlines.

== See also ==
- List of defunct airlines of Albania
