= Estar Avia =

Russian charter airline

IATA	ICAO	Call sign
—	UMS	TOPAZ
- Founded: 2003
- Fleet size: 3
- Destinations: Charter
- Parent company: ESTAR Holding
- Headquarters: Moscow

Estar Avia, formerly Unitemp-M Industrial (which was also known as MPK Rossiya) is a passenger charter airline based in Russia under the ownership of ESTAR Holding.

The parent company approached bankruptcy in 2009 and has since restructured its debts and gained a new investor.

== Fleet ==
Aircraft type	Active	Notes
Yakovlev Yak-40	3	(RA-87807, RA87908, RA-87311)
