= Orbit Express Airlines =

Orbit Air Cargo
IATA	ICAO	Call sign
OA	ORX	FLYCARGO
- Founded: 2003
- Ceased operations: 2007
- Hubs: Istanbul, Turkey; Shanghai Pudong, china
- Focus cities: Almaty, Kazakhstan; Bishkek, Kyrgyzstan; Brussels, Belgium; Dhaka, Bangladesh; Hong Kong; Nanjing, China; Jiangsu, China; Shanghai Pudong
- Headquarters: Kır Sok. 10/2 D.4, 34153 Florya-Istanbul, Turkey

Orbit Express Airlines, shortly Orex Airlines, was a cargo airline based in Istanbul, Turkey. It was established in 2003, and operated scheduled and charter freight services. The airline ceased all operations in 2007.

== History ==
Orex was formerly the Turkish cargo agent of the Dutch airfreight company Schreiner Airways. It was established in the beginning of 2003 with headquarters in Florya, Istanbul, and started operations in April the same year. The cargo service, initially on charter basis, was carried out with a 45-ton payload capacity Airbus A300F-200 freighter aircraft between Istanbul and Gatwick, London, United Kingdom via Brussels, Belgium. At the end of 2003, a second A300F was put into operation. The company started cargo service between Brussels and Shanghai Pudong, China via Tashkent, Uzbekistan. Orex became so Turkey's first ever cargo carrier operating a national link to the Far East. The frequency of scheduled cargo operations increased from weekly three to five days a week between Istanbul and Gatwick via Brussels.

In March 2004, a 105-ton payload capacity Boeing 747F-200 freighter jumbo jet joined the fleet servicing between Shanghai and Brussels via Istanbul. It became the biggest aircraft in operation ever in the history of Turkish civil aviation. The aircraft was flown by foreign pilots with special permit of the Turkish government since no Turkish pilot certified to operate a B747 was available.

Cargo operations were extended to destinations including Almaty in Kazakhstan, Bishkek in Kyrgyzstan, Dhaka in Bangladesh, Hong Kong, Nanjing and Jiangsu in China.

In addition to its core business of carrying freight, Orex also went into the business of passenger flights on charter basis including touristic trips and occasionally in the Middle East for Hajj, Umrah.

The airline ceased all operations in 2007.

== Notable transports ==
In February 2004, Orex carried in-sheets-printed €-banknotes from Zürich, Switzerland to Athens, Greece, where they were cut by Laser and flown back to Zürich.

In March 2004, Orex became the first ever cargo airline carrying humanitarian aid during the intervention of an international peacekeeping force in Haiti after the 2004 coup d'état, which followed political unrest and rebellions. On behalf of the United Nations, 25-ton of food, medicine and two ambulances were flown from Geneva, Switzerland to Haiti via Shannon, Ireland and Gander, Canada. As the rebels did not permit the freighter aircraft A300F to land at the destination airport in Port-au-Prince, Haiti, it was diverted to an airport near Santo Domingo in the Dominican Republic.

== Fleet ==
The fleet of Orex consisted of the following aircraft:

- 4x Airbus A300F4
- 2x Airbus A310F
- 1x Fokker F-27
- 1x Fokker F-50
