= Sunways =

Swedish airline

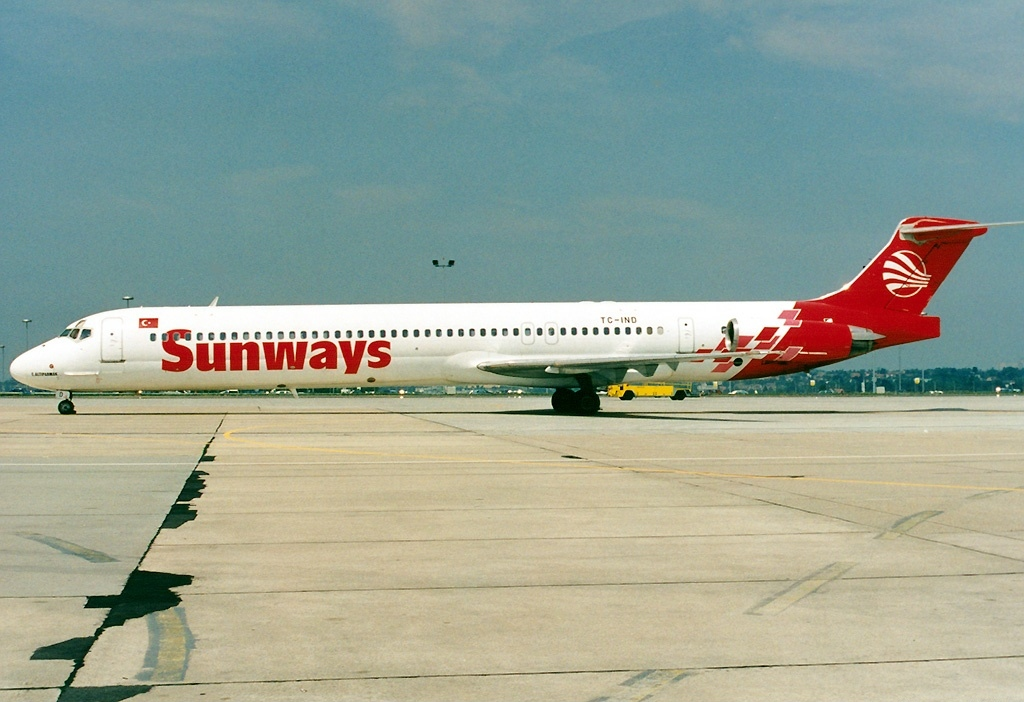
IATA	ICAO	Call sign
IS	SWY/SWW	Sunways/Intersun
- Founded: March 1995
- Ceased operations: October 1997
- Hubs: Antalya Airport; Atatürk Airport; Stockholm-Arlanda Airport
- Fleet size: 8
- Headquarters: Istanbul, Turkey

Sunways was a charter airline consisting of sister companies Sunways Airlines A.B. (SWY), based in Stockholm, Sweden, and SUNWAY Intersun Havacilik Anonim Sirketi (SWW), based at Atatürk Airport and Antalya, Turkey. The airline was in operation from March 1995 to October 1997.

== History ==
Sunways was owned by Tursem A.S., a former travel group based in Istanbul, Turkey, founded in 1985 by Haluk Semiz and Nedim Gürbüz, that went bankrupt on 4 October 1997, causing Sunways to cease operation.

== Fleet ==
The Sunway Intersun Havacilik Turkey-based fleet included 4 MD-83 aircraft.

The Sunways Sweden-based fleet included 4 Boeing 757-200 aircraft.

== Destinations ==
Sunways operated destinations including the following:

- Sweden
  - Stockholm
  - Gothenburg
  - Örebro
  - Umeå
  - Luleå
  - Sundsvall
  - Malmö
  - Jönköping
  - Visby
  - Västerås
  - Nyköping
- Thailand
  - Phuket
- Turkey
  - Istanbul
  - Antalya
  - İzmir
  - Dalaman
- U.A.E.
  - Dubai
- India
  - Goa
- Finland
  - Helsinki
  - Oulu
  - Kokkola
  - Turku
  - Tampere
  - Jyväskylä
- Norway
  - Oslo
  - Bergen
  - Tromsø
  - Trondheim
  - Stavanger
  - Kirkenes
- Denmark
  - Copenhagen
  - Aalborg
  - Billund
  - Esbjerg
  - Karup
- Greece
  - Corfu
  - Rhodes
  - Heraklion
  - Samos
- Spain
  - Las Palmas
  - Tenerife
  - Fuerteventura
  - Arrecife
  - Palma de Mallorca
- Kenya
  - Mombasa
- Tunisia
  - Monastir
- Egypt
  - Sharm el-Sheikh
