= Everjets =

Portuguese airline

IATA	ICAO	Call sign
R1	EVJ	EVERJETS
- Founded: 2011
- Operating bases: Lisbon Portela Airport; Aeroporto Francisco Sá Carneiro (Seasonal)
- Focus cities: Madeira Airport
- Fleet size: 0 (Operated 4 Aircraft)
- Destinations: 3 Regular destinations; Charter and ACMI
- Headquarters: Porto, Portugal
- Key people: Domingos Névoa (CEO) José Pereira (CFO)
- Website: http://www.flyeverjets.com/

Everjets was a Portuguese charter ACMI airline established in 2011. Its debut in commercial flights began in 2015, when it flew to the Madeira Island in an Airbus A320. Everjets after 2018 ran into financial, safety and security problems on the airplanes and suspended all flights operations, having lost its air transport license in December 2022, currently not operating any aircraft and all operations suspended.

== Fleet ==
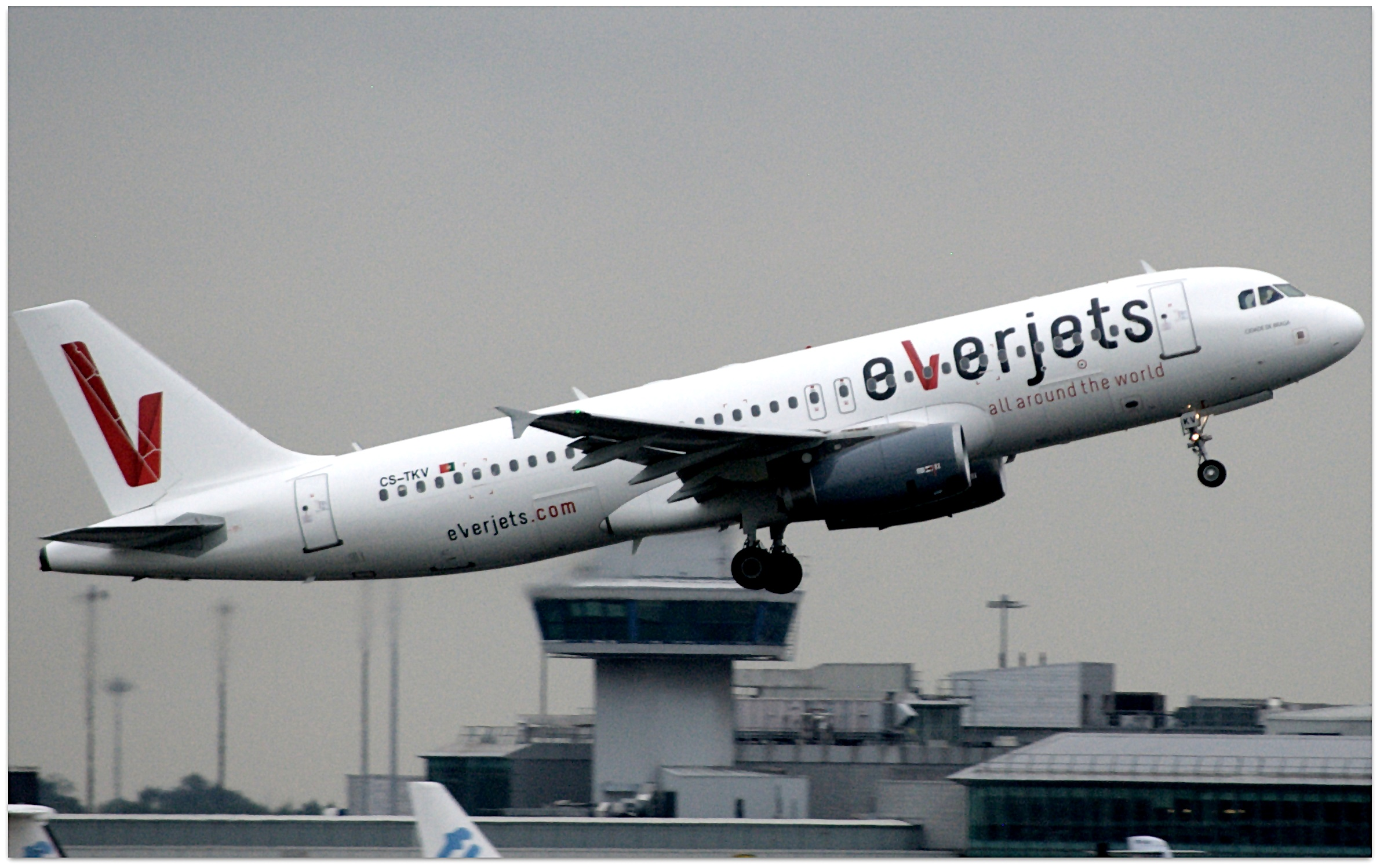
Everjets Airbus A320

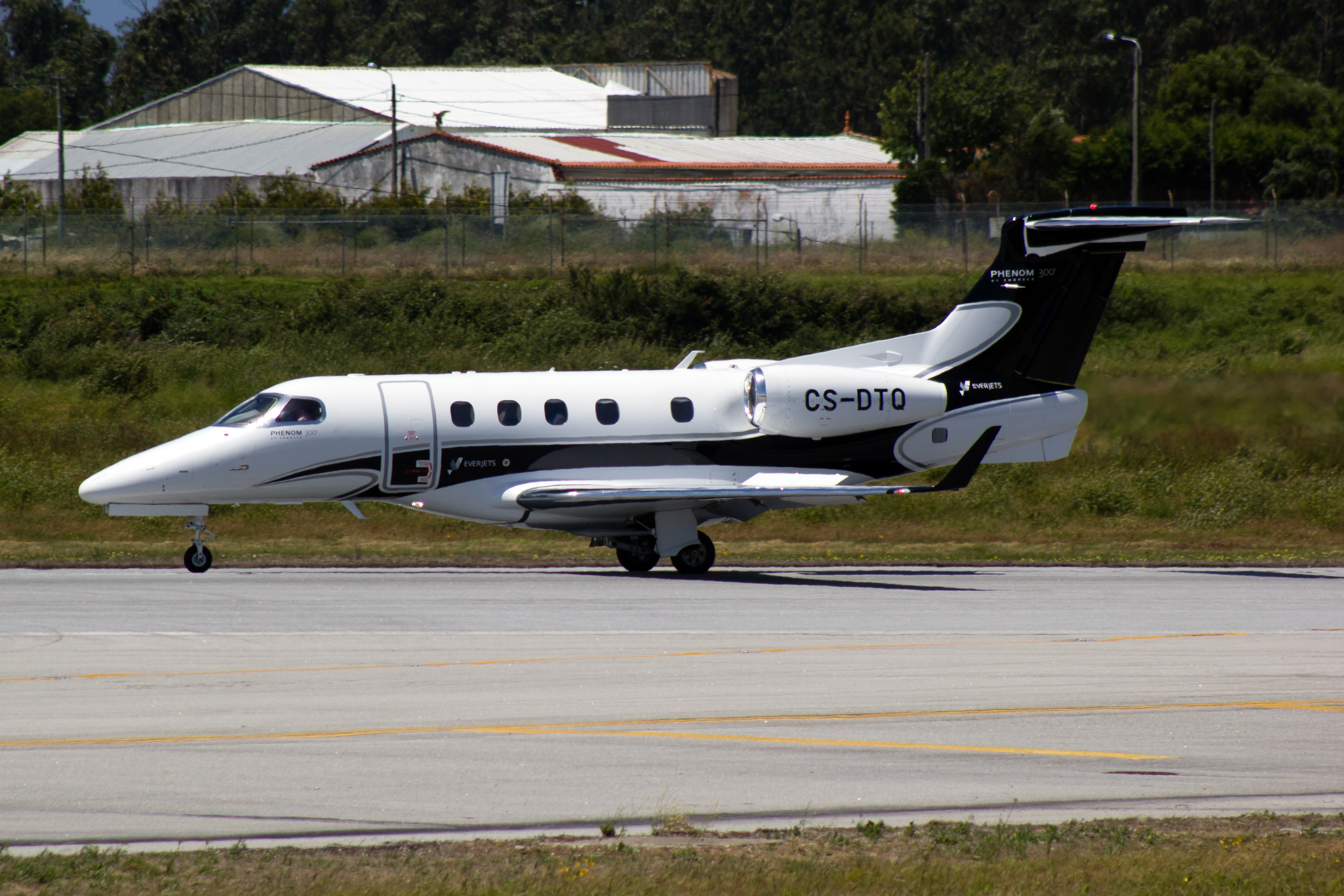
Everjets Embraer Phenom 300

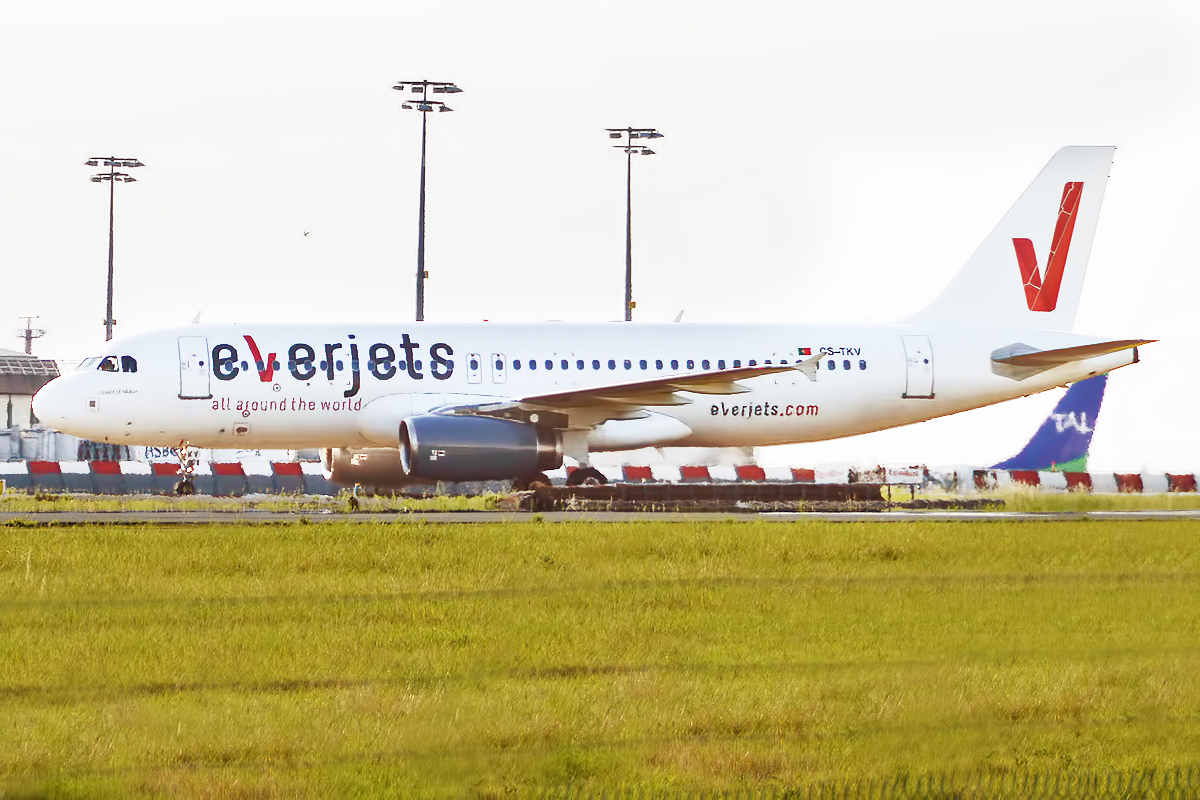
Everjets Airbus A320-200

The Everjets operated the following aircraft (currently does not operate any aircraft):

Everjets Fleet
Aircraft	Photo	In fleet	Passengers	Notes
Airbus A320-200		3	186	1 Leased from Danish Air Transport (OY-RUP).
Embraer Phenom 300		1	6	Aircraft was seized by Portuguese authorities
Total		4		
