= Golden International Airlines =

Turkish charter airline

IATA	ICAO	Call sign
–	GTC	GOLDEN WINGS
- Founded: 20 December 2005
- Ceased operations: Early 2007
- Fleet size: 2
- Parent company: Altin Havayolu Tasimaciligi Turizm ve Ticaret A.S
- Headquarters: Istanbul, Turkey
- Website: http://www.golden-airlines.com/ (defunct)

Golden International Airlines was a short-lived charter airline based in Istanbul, Turkey, operating flights on behalf of tour operators using Boeing 757 aircraft to destinations in Europe.

== History ==
The airline was established in August 2005 and was owned by Alfa Bim, Bilgen Construction, Elsan and Yildiz Security.

== Fleet ==
The Golden International Airlines fleet included the following aircraft:

- 2 Boeing 757-200
