= Rizon Jet =

Arab charter airline

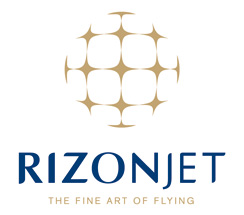
- Company type: Fixed Base Operations (FBO)
- Industry: Aviation
- Founded: 2006
- Defunct: 2016
- Fate: Unknown
- Website: -

Rizon Jet
IATA	ICAO	Call sign
—	RZJ	Rizon Jet

Rizon Jet was an Arab charter airline founded in 2006, and headquartered in Doha, Qatar. Its business mainly focused on the chartering of private jets and luxury travel. It also provided lease of office space and conferencing facilities.

In addition to its Qatari operations, it also had operations in Bahrain, the United Arab Emirates, and the United Kingdom.

== Fleet ==
The Rizon Jet fleet comprised the following aircraft as of August 2017:

Rizon Jet fleet
Aircraft	In service	Orders	Passengers	Notes
Airbus A319-100 (CJ)	1	—		(VQ-BVQ)
Total	1			
