= Sultan Air =

Turkish charter airline

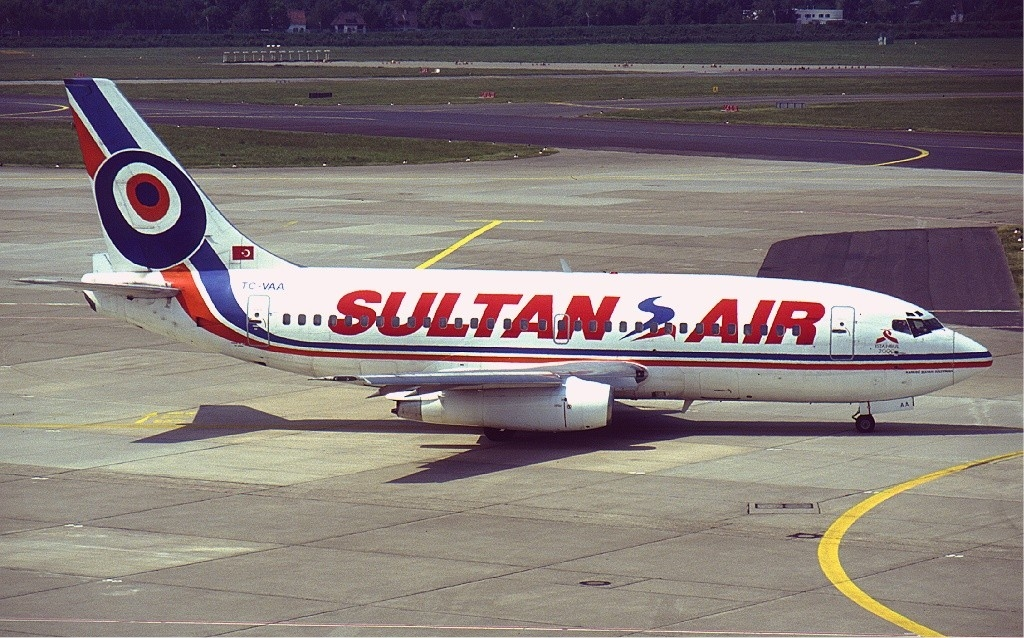
- Sultan Air Boeing 737-200 KvW
IATA	ICAO	Call sign
KJ	SUT	Sultan
- Founded: July 1989
- Ceased operations: November 1993

Sultan Air was a charter airline from Turkey that operated from July 1989 until November 1993.

== History ==
Sultan Air began operations using a SE 210 Caravelle 10B. One year later, two Boeing 737-200 were added. With the start of the Gulf War, the holiday travel market to Turkey declined and Sultan Air suffered. Flights continued, depending mainly on catering to the Turkish workers abroad. But operations could not be sustained depending solely on such a small market (and also the competition from other Turkish charter operators who catered to the same market) and as a consequence at the beginning of 1991 operations were suspended.

The two Boeing 737-200s were used for a subsidiary company called VIP Air which continued to operate domestic flights. Late in 1991 VIP Air was reintegrated into Sultan Air and charter operations were reinstated. 1992 saw an expansion of operations with two Boeing 737-300 and two Airbus A300B4 added to the fleet but by the Spring of 1993 the fleet was reduced to two Boeing 737-200s and two Boeing 727-200.

Sultan Air troubles got worse when an inspection by the Turkish government resulted in safety shortcoming and the operating license was withdrawn in November 1993 with all operations ceasing and the company was liquidated.

== Fleet ==
- 2 SE 210 Caravelle 10B
- 3 Airbus A300B4
- 2 Boeing 727-200
- 8 Boeing 737-200
- 2 Boeing 737-300
- 2 Tupolev Tu-154B2
- 1 Antonov AN-24

(not all aircraft were used at the same time)
