= Albatros Airlines (Turkey) =

Turkish charter airline (1992–1996)

Albatros Airlines Turkey
IATA	ICAO	Call sign
8Z	ABK	Air Albatros
- Founded: May 1992
- Ceased operations: March 1996
- Fleet size: 5

Albatros Airlines was a charter airline from Turkey that operated from 1992 to 1996 (do not confuse with Albatros Airways from Albania).

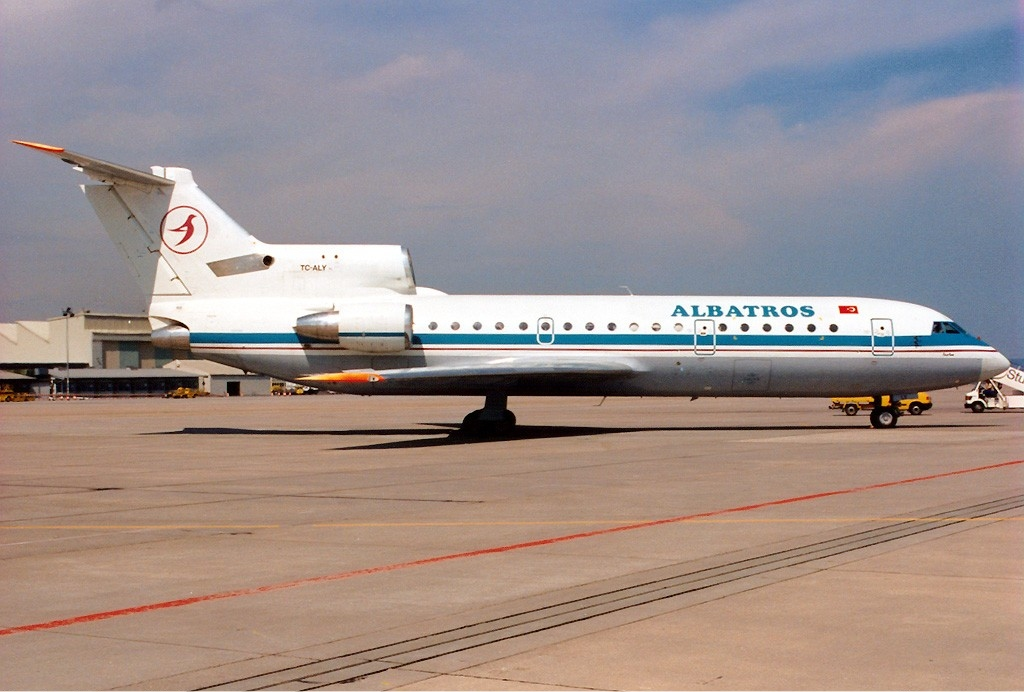
Albatros Airlines Yakovlev Yak-42 (1995)

== History ==
This airline began operations in May 1992 with B727-200 to transport German tourists to holiday resorts in Turkey. The airline suspended operations temporarily in 1993 and the B727-200s were leased to Macedonian Airlines. During the summer season of 1995, Albatros Airlines was back in the air using B737-200 and Yakovlev Yak-42 aircraft.

Following the Birgenair disaster, German operators stopped booking flights on Turkish charter airlines and Albatros Airlines ceased operations in March 1996. German tour operators were scared by the flight ALW301 and avoided after the crash.

== Fleet ==
- Boeing 737-200
- Boeing 727-200
- Yakovlev Yak-42
