= Turkuaz Airlines =

Turkish charter airline

IATA	ICAO	Call sign
–	TRK	TURKU
- Founded: 2006
- Ceased operations: 17 December 2010
- Operating bases: Esenboğa International Airport
- Frequent-flyer program: FLYMORE
- Fleet size: 8
- Destinations: 8
- Headquarters: Ankara, Turkey
- Key people: Hidayet Aydoğan (CEO); Önder Durmaz (Technical Chief); Ziya Akın (Flight Operations Chief); Bülent Demirel (Quality Control Chief)
- Website: www.turkuazairlines.com

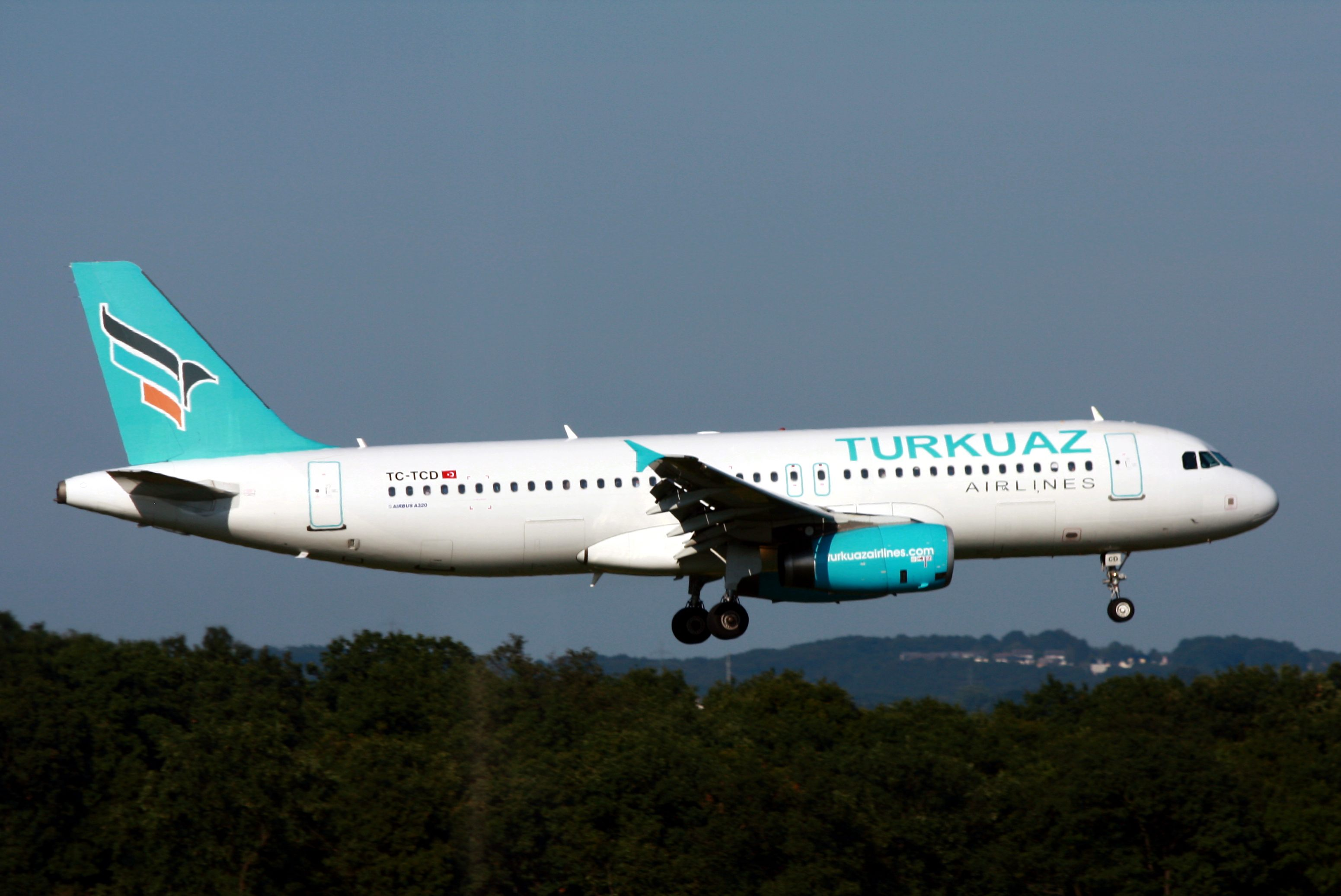
Turkuaz Airlines Airbus A320 (2009)

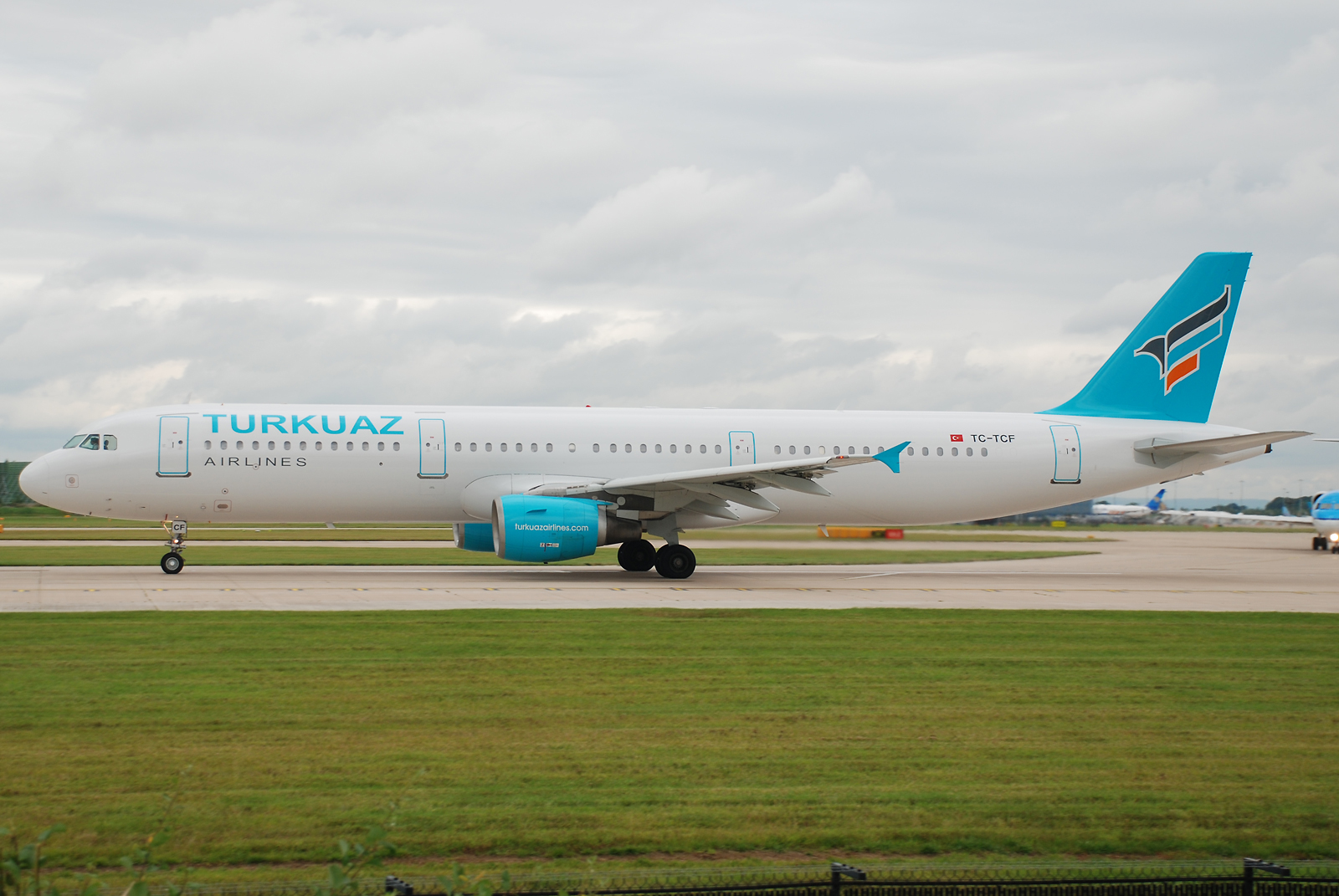
Turkuaz Airlines Airbus A321-200

Turkuaz Airlines was a charter airline based in Ankara, Turkey. It declared bankruptcy in 2010. The word turkuaz means “turquoise” in Turkish.

== Operations ==
Turkuaz Airlines operated an extensive programme of charter flights on behalf of various tour operators. They also supplied aircraft for lease to other airlines.

Their international destinations were to Belgium, Denmark, United Kingdom, Israel, Germany, and the Netherlands. Their domestic destinations from Ankara were to Istanbul, İzmir, and Kayseri.

Turkish Civil Aviation Authorities (SHGM) revoked the AOC (Airline Operating Certificate) for 90 days after an inspection of the company.

Owner and CEO Hidayet Aydogan bought a franchise licence to open Turkey's first Hooters Restaurant.

On 3 March 2011, Turkish businessman Fadil Akgündüz bought Turkuaz Airlines. The name of the company was soon to be changed.
