= List of Airbus A320 family operators =

== Current operators ==
- The following is a list of airlines operating Airbus A320 family aircraft.

Airline	Photo	A318	A319ceo	A319neo	A320ceo	A320neo	A321ceo	A321neo	Total
(Greece) Aegean Airlines					26	21	3	19	69
(Republic of Ireland) Aer Lingus					27	8		14	49
(Timor-Leste) Aero Dili			1		1				2
(Russia) Aeroflot					52	6	32	3	93
(South Korea) Aero K					9				9
Aero Mongolia			2						2
(Kyrgyzstan) Aero Nomad					3				3
(Libya) Afriqiyah Airways			1		5				6
(United Arab Emirates) Air Arabia					35		3	6	44
(Malaysia) AirAsia					69	29	3	8	109
(Kazakhstan) Air Astana						6	2	16	24
(Pakistan) Airblue					5		5	2	12
(Pakistan) AirSial					9				9
(South Korea) Air Busan					6		9	8	23
(Egypt) Air Cairo					9|11	14			34
(New Caledonia) Aircalin						2			2
Air Cambodia					2		1		3
Air Canada			18		27		34	1	80
Air China			24	3	38	53	61	33	212
(France) Air Corsica					2	4			6
(Ivory Coast) Air Côte d'Ivoire			4		2	1			7
Air France		6	11		37		15		69
(China) Air Guilin			2		8				10
(Malta) Airhub Airlines					1				1
Air India			6		4	94	13	10	127
Air India Express					24	12		4	40
Air Macau					6	4	8	4	22
Air New Zealand					17	6		14	37
(Uzbekistan) Air Samarkand							2	2	4
Air Senegal			2				2		4
(South Korea) Air Seoul							6		6
Air Seychelles						2			2
(Canada) Air Transat							8	16	24
(China) Air Travel			2		4	7	2		15
(United States) Allegiant Air			35		94				129
(Japan) All Nippon Airways						11	4	22	37
(Egypt) AlMasria Universal Airlines					2		2		4
(Egypt) AMC Airlines					1				1
(United States) American Airlines			132		48		218	91	489
(Romania) Animawings					2				2
(Israel) Arkia Israeli Airlines					1			2	3
Aruba Airlines					1				3
(South Korea) Asiana Airlines							14	7	21
(Iran) ATA Airlines					3				3
(Faroe Islands) Atlantic Airways					2	2			4
(Russia) Aurora			8						8
(Austria) Austrian Airlines					29	4	6		39
(Colombia) Avianca			7		73	40			120
(Kyrgyzstan) Avia Traffic Company					2				2
(Lithuania) Avion Express					15		3		18
Azerbaijan Airlines			4		6	3			13
(Portugal) Azores Airlines					3			5	8
(Brazil) Azul Brazilian Airlines						51	2	6	59
(Vietnam) Bamboo Airways					6	6	3	5	20
(Thailand) Bangkok Airways			13		9				22
(Indonesia) Batik Air					31	1			32
(China) Beijing Capital Airlines			10		34	7	15	3	69
(Libya) Berniq Airways					2				2
(Bulgaria) BH Air					3				3
Bhutan Airlines			2						2
(United Kingdom) British Airways			29		53	25		15	122
(Belgium) Brussels Airlines			15		16				31
(Bulgaria) Bul Air					1				1
Bulgaria Air			1		5				6
Cambodia Airways			3		3				6
(Romania) Carpatair			1						1
(Hong Kong) Cathay Pacific								16	16
(Philippines) Cebu Pacific					19	6	7	10	42
(Uzbekistan) Centrum Air					4	1		2	7
(Switzerland) Chair Airlines			1		1				3
(China) Chengdu Airlines			4		31	12		5	52
(Taiwan) China Airlines								10	10
China Eastern Airlines			31		138	121	74	27	391
China Express Airlines					11	8			19
China Southern Airlines				9	93	74	83	94	353
(China) Chongqing Airlines			6		13	9		3	31
(Indonesia) Citilink					39	10			49
(China) Colorful Guizhou Airlines						11			11
(Germany) Condor					13	3	10	6	32
(Democratic Republic of the Congo) Congo Airways					2				2
Croatia Airlines			4		2				6
Cyprus Airways					2				2
Dan Air (Romania)			1		3				4
(Lithuania) DAT LT					2		1		3
(United States) Delta Air Lines			57		59		127	94	347
(Bhutan) Druk Air			3			1			4
(United Kingdom) EasyJet			79		180	75		22	356
(Switzerland) Edelweiss Air					10				10
(Egypt) EgyptAir					4	8			12
(Bulgaria) Electra Airways					1				1
(United Arab Emirates) Etihad Airways					19		10		29
(Bulgaria) European Air Charter					7				7
(Germany) Eurowings			26		44	6	5		81
(Germany) Eurowings Discover					16				16
(Austria) Eurowings Europe			6		13				19
(Taiwan) EVA Air							17		17
(Spain) Evelop Airlines					1				1
Express Freighters Australia							6		6
(Finland) Finnair			5		10		15		30
(Sri Lanka) FitsAir					3				3
(Bulgaria) Fly2Sky Airlines					8		2		10
(Saudi Arabia) Flyadeal					11	27			38
(Croatia) Fly Air41 Airways			4		2				6
(Democratic Republic of the Congo) Compagnie Africaine d'Aviation					3				3
(Syria) Fly Cham					4				4
(Iraq) (Kurdistan Region) FlyErbil					2				
(Pakistan) Fly Jinnah					6				6
(Romania) Fly Lili					1				1
(Saudi Arabia) Flynas					4	51			55
(Moldova) FlyOne			1		4				5
FlyOne Armenia			1		2				3
(Turkey) Free Bird Airlines					7				7
(Malta) Freebird Airlines Europe					3				3
(Kenya) Freedom Airline Express					1				1
(United States) Frontier Airlines					8	82	21	44	155
(Lithuania) GetJet Airlines			2		3				5
(South Africa) Global Aviation					8				8
(United States) Global Crossing Airlines			1		6		3		10
(Spain) Gowair Vacation Airlines					4				4
Governments; Executive And Private Jets		17	77	5	28	7	1	2	135
(Bahrain) Gulf Air					11	6	6	4	27
(China) GX Airlines					6	4			10
(United States) Hawaiian Airlines								18	18
(Lithuania) Heston Airlines					4				4
Hi Fly Malta			1				1		2
(Nepal) Himalaya Airlines			1		3				4
(Moldova) HiSky			1						1
(Romania) HiSky Europe					4			2	6
(Hong Kong) HK Express					6	10	13	12	41
Hong Kong Airlines					17		3		20
(Spain) Iberia			3		9	22	13	8	55
(Spain) Iberia Express					13		4	4	21
(India) IndiGo					26	168		170	364
(Russia) IrAero			1						1
Iran Air					6		1		7
Iran Airtour					3				3
Iran Aseman Airlines					6				6
(Iraq) Iraqi Airways					3		2		5
(Israel) Israir					7				7
(Iceland) Icelandair								2	2
(Italy) ITA Airways			11		24	14		3	52
(Kuwait) Jazeera Airways					8	9			17
(Cambodia) JC International Airlines					5				5
(United Kingdom) Jet2.com							3	5	8
(United States) JetBlue					130		63	28	221
(Chile) JetSmart					3	19		8	30
JetSmart Argentina					8				8
(Australia) Jetstar					55	5	6	21	88
(Singapore) Jetstar Asia					13				13
Jetstar Japan					19			3	22
(Ukraine) Jonika Airlines			1						1
Jordan Aviation					3				3
(China) Juneyao Airlines					30	22	27	14	93
(Iran) Kish Air							2		2
(Netherlands) KLM								17	17
Kuwait Airways					10	6			16
(South Korea) Korean Air								8	8
(France) La Compagnie								2	2
(Laos) Lao Airlines					4				4
(Chile) LATAM Airlines Group			40		135	24	49	1	260
(Malta) Lauda Europe					29				29
(Brazil) Levu Air Cargo							1		1
(Libya) Libyan Airlines					6				6
(Libya) Libyan Wings			4						4
(China) Longjiang Airlines					7		2		9
(China) Loong Air			1		27	34		12	74
(China) Lucky Air					7	6			13
(Germany) Lufthansa			23		56	31	54	17	181
(Iran) Mahan Air							1		1
(Maldives) Maldivian					1				1
Malta MedAir					2				2
(Libya) Medsky Airways					1				1
(Iran) Meraj Airlines					4		1		5
(Russia) Meridian Air Company					1				1
(Lebanon) Middle East Airlines					9			9	18
Myanmar Airways International			4		4				8
Nepal Airlines					2				2
(Egypt) Nesma Airlines					2				2
(Australia) Network Aviation (for QantasLink)					11				11
(Egypt) Nile Air					4		2		6
(Russia) Nordwind Airlines							7	2	9
(Tunisia) Nouvelair					11				11
(Sweden) Novair								2	2
(Greece) Olympus Airways					1				1
(Spain) One Airways			1						1
(Vietnam) Pacific Airlines					17				17
(Uzbekistan) Panorama Airways					1				1
Pakistan International Airlines					17				17
(Philippines) PAL Express					12		4		16
(Japan) Peach Aviation					30	8		1	39
(Turkey) Pegasus Airlines					6	46		34	86
(Indonesia) Pelita Air Service					10				10
(Philippines) Philippine Airlines					3		18	8	29
(Spain) Privilege Style							1		1
(Uzbekistan) Qanot Sharq					2			3	5
(Australia) Qantas								7	7
Qatar Airways					29		2		31
(Iran) Qeshm Airlines					3				3
(China) Qingdao Airlines					14	22		2	38
(Libya) Rahila Airlines					1				1
(Russia) Red Wings Airlines					2		7		9
(Russia) Rossiya Airlines			12		5				17
Royal Air Philippines			2		2				4
Royal Brunei Airlines			2		6	7			15
(Jordan) Royal Jordanian Airlines			1		5		2		10
(Russia) S7 Airlines			3		12	19	4	8	46
(Oman) SalamAir						10		2	12
(Saudi Arabia) Saudia					37		15	7	59
(Sweden) (Norway) (Denmark) Scandinavian Airlines			4		6	73		3	86
(Singapore) Scoot					11	7		9	27
(China) Shenzhen Airlines			1		76	30		6	113
(China) Sichuan Airlines			19		55	37	47	27	185
(Chile) Sky Airline						25		3	28
(Cambodia) Sky Angkor Airlines							2		2
(Egypt) SkyBird Airlines					1				1
(Greece) Sky Express					1	7			8
(Slovakia) Sky One					3		1		4
(Russia) Smartavia						1			1
(Solomon Islands) Solomon Airlines					1				1
(South Africa) South African Airways					7				7
(China) Spring Airlines					75	47		12	134
(Portugal) Springjet							1		1
(Sri Lanka) SriLankan Airlines					7	2		4	13
(Romania) Star East Airline					2				2
(Japan) StarFlyer					11				11
(Taiwan) Starlux Airlines								13	13
(The Gambia) Su Airlines					1				1
Sudan Airways					1				1
(Denmark) Sunclass Airlines							8		8
(Germany) Sundair			2		3				5
(Indonesia) Super Air Jet					26				26
(Switzerland) Swiss International Air Lines					15	6	8	2	31
(Syria) Syrian Air					8				8
TAP Air Portugal			5		16	11	3	19	54
(Thailand) Thai Airways International					20				20
(China) Tianjin Airlines					27	16	2		45
(China) Tibet Airlines			27	9	6				42
Tigerair Taiwan					11	4			15
(United Kingdom) Titan Airways					2		6	2	10
(Croatia) Trade Air			1		4				5
(Netherlands) Transavia Holland								18	18
(Indonesia) TransNusa					4		1		5
(Tunisia) Tunisair			4		16	2			22
(Turkey) Turkish Airlines			6		12	4	65	54	141
(Cyprus) Tus Airways					4				4
Undisclosed customers		18	222	3	244	102	94	12	695
(United States) United Airlines			78		71			51	200
(Russia) Ural Airlines			4		16	3	7	6	36
(Bangladesh) US-Bangla Airlines								8	8
Uzbekistan Airways					10	3		3	16
(Vietnam) VietJet Air					30		42	21	93
Vietnam Airlines							48	20	68
(Vietnam) Vietravel Airlines							3		3
Virgin Australia Regional Airlines					7				7
(Mexico) VivaAerobús					20	20	9	9	58
VivaColombia					11	11			22
(Mexico) Volaris			1		40	51	10	21	122
(Spain) Volotea			20		19				39
(Bulgaria) Voyage Air			2						2
(Spain) Vueling			6		71	25	18	4	124
(China) West Air			4		25	6	3		38
(Portugal) White Airways					1				1
(Ukraine) Windrose Airlines					1		4		5
(Jersey) Wizz Air Holdings (Note: incl. Wizz Air Hungary, Wizz Air Malta and Wizz Air UK)					23	6	40	190	259
(Russia) Yamal Airlines					8		3		11
(Yemen) Yemenia					4				4
(Iran) Zagros Airlines			1		7		2		10

Last complete update on 22 April 2022.

== See also ==
- List of Airbus A320 orders
- List of Airbus A320neo family orders
- List of Boeing 737 operators
- List of Airbus A220 operators
