= List of Airbus A320 family orders and deliveries =

These are the orders and deliveries the Airbus A320 family, which includes the A320ceo family and the A320neo family.

== Orders and deliveries ==
List of orders, deliveries and operators of the Airbus A320 family, as of 30 September 2026:

- Ord — number of aircraft ordered from Airbus
- Del — number of aircraft delivered by Airbus
- Bl — number of aircraft still to be delivered to the specified customer
- Leasing Company.
- Defunct carriers.

Customer	A318			A319ceo			A319neo			A320ceo			A320neo			A321ceo			A321neo			A320 family		
Customer	Ord	Del	Bl	Ord	Del	Bl	Ord	Del	Bl	Ord	Del	Bl	Ord	Del	Bl	Ord	Del	Bl	Ord	Del	Bl	Ord	Del	Bl
Airbus Executive and Private Aviation	20	20		77	77		11	9	2	20	20		24	15	9	1	1		2	2		155	144	11
Abra Group													50		50							50		50
Accipiter													13	12	1				7	3	4	20	15	5
ACES Colombia										8	8											8	8	
Adria Airways										5	5											5	5	
Aegean Airlines										19	19		9	9					32	17	15	60	45	15
AerCap				7	7					20	20		152	151	1	8	8		159	134	25	346	320	26
Aerdragon Aviation Partners										13	13											13	13	
Aer Lingus										17	17		8	6	2	3	3		6	6		34	32	2
Aeroflot				4	4					1	1					26	26					31	31	
Aero K										3	3											3	3	
Aero Lloyd										4	4					5	5					9	9	
Aerospace Trading Holding Limited										16	16					11	11					27	27	
Aerostar Leasing										12	12											12	12	
AerVenture				12	12					44	44					3	3					59	59	
Afriqiyah Airways				3	3					8	8											11	11	
Aigle Azur				1	1																	1	1	
Air Arabia										49	49		70	13	57				50		50	169	62	107
Air Asia										188	188		38	38					346	16	330	572	242	330
Air Asia X																			20		20	20		20
Air Astana										4	4		5		5	2	2		20		20	31	6	25
Air Berlin				13	13					54	54					18	18					85	85	
Air Blue										1	1											1	1	
Air Cairo										4	4		15		15							19	4	15
Air Calin										1	1		2	2								3	3	
Air Canada				37	37					28	28					10	10		15		15	90	75	15
Air China				33	33		10	9	1	40	40		22	22		53	53		125	33	92	283	190	93
Air China Zhejiang Company										3	3											3	3	
Air Côte d'Ivoire										2	2		1	1								3	3	
Aircraft Purchase Fleet				10	10					16	16											26	26	
Air Deccan										12	12											12	12	
Air France	18	18		19	19					45	45					7	7					89	89	
Air India													90		90				210		210	300		300
Air Inter				9	9					22	22					7	7					38	38	
Air Jamaica										4	4											4	4	
Air Lease Corporation										30	30		30	30		29	29		136	136		225	225	
Air Macau																1	1					1	1	
Air Malta										2	2											2	2	
Air Mauritius				2	2																	2	2	
Air Namibia				2	2																	2	2	
Air New Zealand										18	18		4	4					11	9	2	33	31	2
Air One										26	26											26	26	
Air Travel				3	3																	3	3	
ALAFCO										25	25		39	39								64	64	
ITA Airlines				12	12					11	11					23	23					46	46	
Allegiant Air										13	13											13	13	
All Nippon Airways										33	33					7	7		27		27	67	40	27
Alphastream AG										3	3					2	2					5	5	
Al Sahaab Aircraft Leasing										5	5											5	5	
American Airlines				7	7											71	71		246	86	160	324	164	160
America West				35	35					23	23											58	58	
Ana Holding													26	22	4	4	4		25	22	3	55	48	7
Ansett Australia										19	19											19	19	
Arctic Aviation Assets Dac													7	7								7	7	
Arkia Israel Airlines																			3	2	1	3	2	1
Asiana Airlines										4	4					8	8		25	13	12	37	25	12
Asiawide										2	2											2	2	
Atlantic Airways				1	1					1	1		2		2							4	2	2
Austrian Airlines				7	7					8	8					6	6					21	21	
Avianca				8	8					39	39		74	17	57				2	2		123	66	57
Avianca El Salvador				21	21					45	45					12	12					78	78	
Avianca Holdings				5	5					6	6					2	2					13	13	
Aviation Capital Group				4	4					41	41		40	38	2	22	22		75	42	33	182	147	35
AviLease													10		10				20		20	30		30
Avolon				4	4					4	4		131	99	32	4	4		262	9	253	405	120	285
AWAS										100	100					3	3					103	103	
Azerbaijan Airlines				3	3								6		6				6		6	15	3	12
Azul Finance LLC													9	9					19	3	16	28	12	16
BBAM Aircraft Management										4	4											4	4	
Beijing Capital Airlines										4	4											4	4	
Berniq Airways													6		6							6		6
BMED – British Mediterranean Airways																2	2					2	2	
BMI – British Midland International										6	6					8	8					14	14	
BOC Aviation				17	17					177	177		137	74	63	51	51		143	12	131	525	331	194
Bank of Communications Financial Leasing Co., Ltd.										2	2		50	50		10	10		8	8		70	70	
Boullioun Aviation Services				2	2					24	24					4	4					30	30	
British Airways	2	2		33	33					51	51		40	36	4	16	16		24	20	4	166	158	8
CALC-China Aircraft Leasing Company				1	1					72	72		128	78	50	6	6		75	33	42	282	190	92
Canadian Airlines										2	2											2	2	
CASGC				3	3																	3	3	
Cathay Dragon										5	5					2	2					7	7	
Cathay Pacific													8	1	7				56	34	22	64	35	29
Cebu Pacific				10	10					29	29		14	13	1	7	7		103	20	83	163	79	84
Chengdu Airlines				4	4					26	26		14	14					5	5		49	49	
China Airlines																			11	6	5	11	6	5
China Development Bank										18	18		63	45	18	7	7		109	30	79	197	100	97
China Eastern Airlines				33	33					124	124		120	93	27	72	72		151	36	115	500	358	142
China Eastern Xibei Airlines										13	13											13	13	
China Express Airlines										11	11		20	20								31	31	
China Northern Airlines																10	10					10	10	
China Southern Airlines				14	14		9	9		100	100		61	34	27	77	77		178	67	111	441	303	138
CIT Group				36	36					80	80		20	20		34	34		1	1		171	171	
Citilink													25		25							25		25
CMB Financial Leasing													20	20		8	8		11	11		39	39	
Colorful Guizhou Airlines													1	1								1	1	
Condor													2		2				2		2	4		4
Condor Berlin										12	12											12	12	
Croatia Airlines				4	4					2	2											6	6	
Cyprus Airways Old				2	2					8	8											10	10	
Czech Airlines				7	7					6	6											13	13	
DAE Aviation Group													9		9							9		9
DAE Capital													2	2								2	2	
DAE Cidron																			7		7	7		7
Delta Air Lines																127	127		189	106	83	316	233	83
Druk Air				3	3								4	1	3				2		2	9	4	5
EasyJet				172	172					149	149		200	79	121				184	33	151	705	433	272
Edelweiss Air										3	3											3	3	
EgyptAir										12	12					4	4					16	16	
Etihad Airways										11	11					7	7		20		20	38	18	20
EVA Air																			18		18	18		18
Finnair				5	5					9	9					9	9					23	23	
First Choice Airways										4	4											4	4	
Flightlease										9	9					1	1					10	10	
Flynas													160	64	96				56		56	216	64	152
FlyOne Armenia																			2		2	2		2
Frontier Airlines	9	9		19	19					4	4		107	95	12	19	19		198	59	139	356	205	151
Garuda Indonesia										7	7		8	8								15	15	
GATX Flightlease										2	2											2	2	
GB Airways										7	7					6	6					13	13	
GECAS	12	12		69	69					236	236		153	100	53	38	38		248	85	163	756	540	216
Germania				3	3											2	2					5	5	
Germanwings				31	31																	31	31	
Global aircraft Trading PTE LTD										8	8					3	3					11	11	
GoAir										15	15		56	56								71	71	
Grupo Taca										1	1											1	1	
Guinness Peat Aviation										51	51											51	51	
Gulf Air										30	30		9	9		6	6		16	16		61	61	
Hainan Airlines				28	28					28	28		27		27				13		13	96	56	40
Hamburg International				12	10	2																12	10	2
Hawaiian Airlines																			16	16		16	16	
HK Express													5	5								5	5	
Hong Kong Airlines										30	30											30	30	
Iberia				21	21					85	85		21	15	6	19	19		27	20	7	173	160	13
Icelandair																			13		13	13		13
ICBC				2	2					48	48		45	45		16	16		33	33		144	144	
International Airlines Group													31		31				21		21	52		52
ILFC				153	153					213	213					91	91					457	457	
IndiGo										100	100		449	230	219				791	204	587	1,340	534	806
Interjet										20	20		2	2								22	22	
International Airfinance Corporation										30	30											30	30	
International Aviation Investments and Trading Lim										6	6					5	5					11	11	
Iran Air																1	1					1	1	
Israir Airlines										3	3											3	3	
ITA Airways													11		11							11		11
Jackson Square Aviation										4	4		17		17				33		33	54	4	50
Japan Airlines																			11		11	11		11
Jazeera Airways										10	10		20	2	18				8		8	38	12	26
Jet2 plc																			146	24	122	146	24	122
JetBlue Airways										132	132					61	61		85	41	44	278	234	44
JetSmart										6	6		40	21	19				58	10	48	94	37	67
JSC Novatek																				16			16	
Juneyao Airlines										19	19		28	15	13	15	15		25	13	12	87	62	25
Kawasaki Leasing										8	8											8	8	
Kingfisher Airlines										2	2					6	6					8	8	
KLM																			10	10		10	10	
Korean Air																			56	20	36	56	20	36
Kuwait Airways										3	3		9	9					9	3	6	21	15	6
Lao Airlines										2	2											2	2	
LATAM Brasil				25	25					78	78					12	12					115	115	
LATAM Airlines Group	15	15		26	26					68	68		48	38	10	38	38		65	5	60	260	190	70
Leisure International Airways																2	2					2	2	
Lerner Enterprises				1	1																	1	1	
Libyan Airlines										7	7											7	7	
Lion Air										44	44		113	1	112				65		65	222	45	177
Loong Air										11	11		9	9								20	20	
Lotus Air										1	1											1	1	
LTU International										4	4					2	2					6	6	
Lufthansa				30	30					123	123		85	66	19	64	64		39	25	14	341	308	33
Macquerie Aircraft Leasing				1	1					36	36					7	7					44	44	
Macquarie Financial Holdings Ltd													11	11								11	11	
Malta MedAir													3	3								3	3	
Mexicana de Aviación										16	12	4										16	12	4
Middle East Airlines										7	7					6	6		15	10	5	28	23	5
Monarch Airlines										2	2					7	7					9	9	
MyTravel Airways (UK)																4	4					4	4	
Nacil Indian Airlines				19	19					35	35					20	20					74	74	
Nepal Airlines										2	2											2	2	
Niki				2	2					14	14					4	4					20	20	
Northwest Airlines				77	77					78	78											155	155	
Nouvelair										3	3											3	3	
OHA Center Street Aircraft Holding				2	2																	2	2	
Onur Air																2	2					2	2	
Orbest Orizonia Airlines										2	2											2	2	
Orix										24	24											24	24	
Pacific Airlines										10	10											10	10	
Peach Aviation										10	10		9	9					1	1		20	20	
Pegasus Airlines													42	42					108	71	37	150	113	37
Philippine Airlines										15	15					24	24		21	8	13	60	47	13
Qantas										75	75		46	6	40	1	1		103	32	71	225	114	111
Qatar Airways										39	39					6	6		50		50	95	45	50
Qingdao Airlines										5	5		15	15					3	3		23	23	
Riyadh Air																			60		60	60		60
Royal Air Maroc																4	4					4	4	
Royal Brunei Airlines													7	7								7	7	
Royal Jordanian										3	3											3	3	
Sabena				15	15					3	3					3	3					21	21	
SalamAir													1	1								1	1	
Saudia										7	7		42	30	12	15	15		128	17	111	192	69	123
Saudi Gulf Airline Company										4	4											4	4	
Scandinavian Airlines				4	4								65	65		8	8					77	77	
Scoot										49	49		24	13	11				11	5	6	84	67	17
Shanghai Airlines																5	5					5	5	
Shenzhen Airlines				8	8					64	64		35	35					64	3	61	171	110	61
Shohin Airlines													2		2				2		2	4		4
Shorouk Air										2	2											2	2	
Sichuan Airlines				16	16					35	35		11	8	3	41	41		8	5	3	111	105	6
SilkAir				8	8					19	19											27	27	
Skyserv													4	4								4	4	
Sky Airline																			10		10	10		10
Sky Express													1	1								1	1	
SMBC Aviation Capital				1	1					89	89		191	78	113	6	6		294	68	226	581	242	339
South African Airways				11	11					17	17											28	28	
Spanair										11	11					3	3					14	14	
Spirit Airlines				7	7					55	55		56	56		30	30		4	4		152	152	
Spring Airlines										46	46		69	40	29				21	11	10	136	97	39
SriLankan Airlines										2	2											2	2	
StarFlyer										3	3											3	3	
Sudan Airways										1	1											1	1	
Sunclass Airlines										6	6					4	4					10	10	
Swiss International Air Lines										4	4		16	13	3	3	3		9	7	2	32	27	5
Swissair				6	6					17	17					6	6					29	29	
Synergy Aerospace										20	20											20	20	
Syrian Air										6	6											6	6	
TAP Portugal				13	13					5	5		16	10	6	3	3		24	17	7	61	48	13
TAROM	4	4																				4	4	
Texas Aviation Group				3	3																	3	3	
Thai Airways International										5	5											5	5	
Thomas Cook AG										2	2											2	2	
Three Twenty Holdings										2	2											2	2	
Tibet Airlines				29	29		13	13		6	6											48	48	
Tigerair Australia										6	6											6	6	
Tigerair Taiwan													7	2	5				4		4	11	2	9
Timaero Ireland Limited													20		20							20		20
TransAsia Airways										5	5					12	12					17	17	
Transavia																			8	8		8	8	
Transavia France													8	8								8	8	
Tunisair				4	4					18	18		5	5								27	27	
Turkish Airlines				6	6					19	19					65	65		238	53	185	328	143	185
United Airlines				55	55					98	98								220	64	156	373	217	156
US Airways				66	66					28	28					121	121					215	215	
UTair Aviation																12	12					12	12	
Uzbekistan Airways										10	10								14		14	24	10	14
VietJet Air										12	12					36	36		238	53	185	286	101	185
Vietnam Aircraft Leasing Company																10	10					10	10	
Vietnam Airlines																41	41					41	41	
Virgin America				8	8					19	19											27	27	
Vistara													13	13								13	13	
VivaAerobús										15	15		20	20					45	36	9	80	71	9
Viva Air Perú													8	8								4	4	
Viva Air Colombia										5	5											5	5	
Volaris				11	11					33	33		56	43	13				122	26	96	222	113	109
Vueling Airlines										18	18		25	25		15	15		4	4		62	62	
West Air							2	2					2	2								4	4	
Wizz Air										72	72		6	6		40	40		447	212	235	565	230	235
WOW Air																4	4					4	4	
XiamenAir													20	8	12				55	2	53	75	10	65
Xizang Airlines							16	16														16	16	
Yemenia										2	2		4		4				4		4	10	2	8
Z/C Aviation Partners One LLC				9	9																	9	9	
Undisclosed							10		10				218		218				394		394	622		622
Totals	80	80		1,486	1,484	2	58	45	13	4,756	4,752	4	4,352	2,492	1,860	1,784	1,784		7,919	2,263	5,656	20,435	12,900	7,535

Data through end of September 2026.

== See also ==
- List of Airbus A320neo family orders and deliveries
- List of Airbus A320 family operators
- List of Boeing 737 MAX orders and deliveries
- List of Airbus A220 orders and deliveries
