= 5Q =

5Q or 5-Q may refer to:

- 5Q, IATA code for Holiday Europe
- 5Q, former IATA code for Best Air
- 5Q, former IATA code for Euroceltic Airways
- 5q, an arm of Chromosome 5 (human)
  - Chromosome 5q deletion syndrome
  - 5q- syndrome; see Myelodysplastic syndrome
- AD-5Q, a model of Douglas A-1 Skyraider
- 5Q, designation for one of the Qumran Caves
- MD 5Q, a section of Maryland Route 5
- 5Q, the production code for the 1980 Doctor Who serial Meglos

== See also ==
- Q5 (disambiguation)
