= Wataniya Airways =

Kuwaiti airline

IATA	ICAO	Call sign
Q9	WAN	WATANIYA
- Founded: 2005
- Commenced operations: January 2009
- Ceased operations: March 2011; September 2018
- Hubs: Kuwait International Airport
- Fleet size: 7
- Destinations: 17
- Headquarters: Kuwait International Airport; Al Farwaniyah Governorate, Kuwait
- Key people: Ali Al Fouzan (Chairman); Rakan Al Tuwaijri (CEO)
- Website: wataniyaairways.com

Kuwait Wataniya Airways (K.S.C.) (Arabic: (شركة الخطوط الوطنية الكويتية (ش.م.ك), doing business as Wataniya Airways (Arabic: الخطوط الوطنية), was a publicly traded company on the Kuwait Stock Exchange. Wataniya Airways' hub was the Sheikh Saad Terminal in Kuwait while its corporate headquarters were on the property of Kuwait International Airport, Al Farwaniyah Governorate, Kuwait.

The airline was founded in 2006 and received an Air Operators Certificate in July 2008. It started services with an Airbus A320 in January 2009 from the Sheikh Saad General Aviation Terminal and provided flights from Kuwait to destinations across the Persian Gulf, wider Middle East and Europe. Wataniya Airways was the first and only commercial airline to operate its flights out of a private terminal in Kuwait. Wataniya suspended operations in 2011 due to the non-profitable model of its product offering Business and Premium Economy classes only.

In July 2017 the airline resumed operations with an all Economy class product this time but was forced to suspend service again by Kuwait authorities in September 2018 for three months due to several delayed or cancelled flights leaving passengers stranded at airports, eventually, it closed down after its air operators licence was cancelled for not taking serious measures to resolve issues during the suspension period.

== History ==
=== Early years ===
Wataniya Airways was formed as part of the Kuwait Government's liberalization of aviation services in 2005 and was founded by Kuwaiti corporations that include corporate giant Kipco which owns majority shares in the company. The airline launched a public offering of 350 million shares in January 2006, the equivalent of 70% of its capital of KWD50 million (US$188 million), and listed its shares on the Kuwait Stock Exchange by the end of 2008. Wataniya Airways' visual identity was unveiled to the public in May 2008. The tail fin of Wataniya Airways' aircraft was purple, and featured the internationally known symbol of Kuwait—the Kuwait Towers. Wataniya Airways' A320 aircraft has a dual-cabin configuration composed of Business and Economy sections.

Due to overcapacity on some flights, the airline decided in December 2010 to reduce operation, park three aircraft and lay off some employees. On 16 March 2011, Wataniya Airways ceased all its operations because of financial difficulties and began discussions with its shareholders to determine the future of the company.

=== Restart of operations ===
In August 2016, it was announced that the airline is considering resuming services. The decision to restart flights follows the company's settlement of debt talks with Kuwait Airways’ Kuwait Aviation Services Company. The carrier's legal claims with Kuwait's Aviation Lease and Finance Company (ALAFCO) are still under review in Kuwaiti court. Initial 17 destinations were mentioned as Saudi Arabia, Bahrain, United Arab Emirates, Egypt, India, Pakistan, Iran and Iraq. In the second year, destinations in Lebanon, Jordan, Maldives, Sri Lanka, United Kingdom, Germany, Switzerland and Spain were to be started.

Wataniya re-received its air operator certificate (AOC) on 19 June 2017. In July 2017, it was announced that the airline would restart operations from Kuwait International Airport to 3 destinations, Baku, Tbilisi and Sarajevo. The airline also announced 10 other new destinations will be added after the airline has completely begun operations.

In November 2017, it was announced the airline had placed an order with Airbus for 25 A320neo aircraft. In July 2018, Golden Falcon Aviation, the exclusive aircraft provider of Wataniya Airways, confirmed the order for 25 Airbus A320neo family aircraft. In July 2018, at the Farnborough Air Show the airline announced it had placed an order with Embraer for 10 Embraer E195-E2 with options for 10 additional aircraft. The aircraft were due to begin being delivered in 2020, these aircraft would have a business and economy class and be the launch customer of the staggered seat business class offered by Embraer.

=== Second grounding ===
In August 2018, the airline was warned to be shut down by Kuwaiti authorities over insufficient reliability of operations stating frequent delays and cancellations.

In September 2018, Wataniya Airways announced it would terminate the ACMI contract with Olympus Airways which operated two Airbus A320 series aircraft for them. This left the airline with only one aircraft available, which additionally is grounded since several weeks due to engine issues. On 3 September 2018, the airline suspended all operations until further notice. On 7 September 2018, the Kuwaiti authorities suspended the airline's operational license for three months.

Wataniya's AOC was revoked in December 2018 putting the carrier out of business again.

== Destinations ==
As of September 2018, Wataniya Airways operated scheduled services to 16 destinations in the Middle East and Eastern Europe from its base in Kuwait.

== Fleet ==
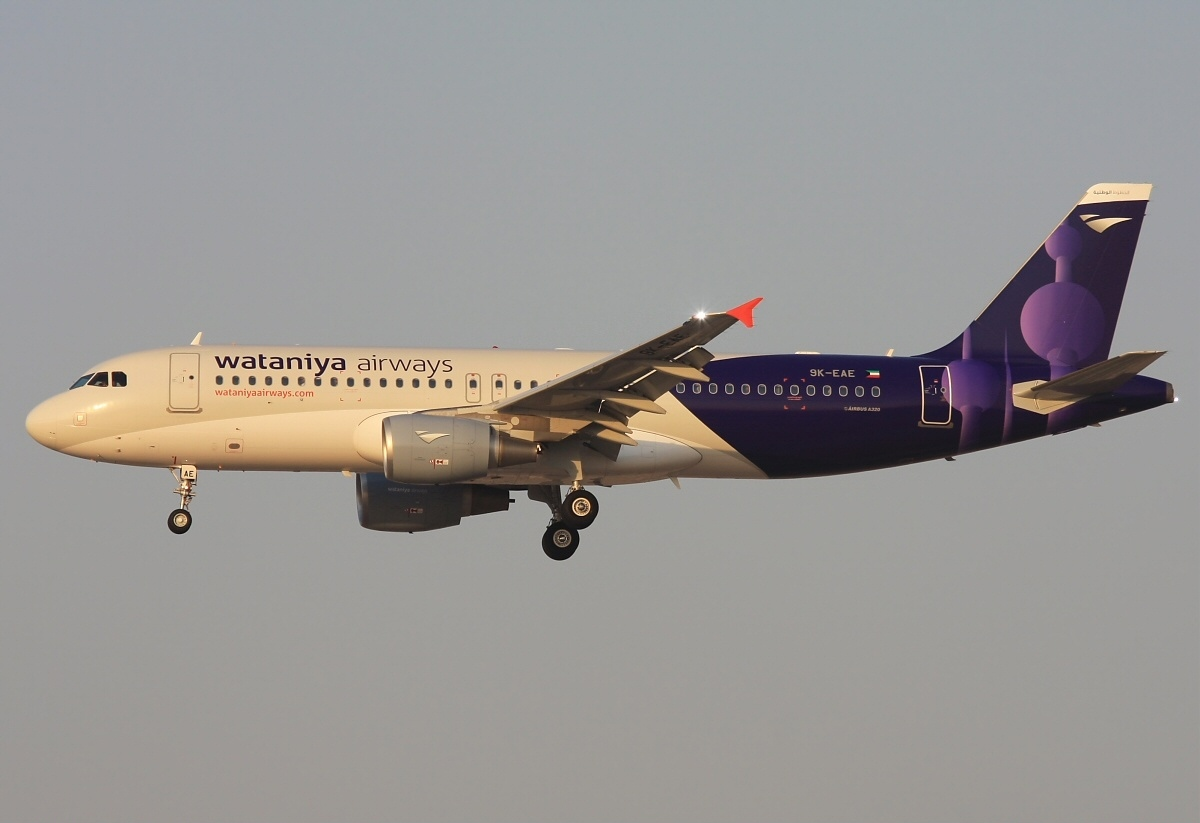
Wataniya Airways Airbus A320-200 in former livery

As of September 2018 the Wataniya Airways fleet consisted of the following aircraft:

Wataniya Airways fleet
Aircraft	In service	Orders	Passengers			Notes
Aircraft	In service	Orders	C	Y	Total	Notes
Airbus A320-200	1	—	12	120	132	grounded due to engine issue

Wataniya had orders for twenty five Airbus A320neo and ten Embraer E195-E2 with deliveries planned from 2020.
