= Onur Air =

Low-cost airline of Turkey (1992–2021)

IATA	ICAO	Call sign
8Q	OHY	ONUR AIR
- Founded: 14 April 1992
- Commenced operations: 14 May 1992
- Ceased operations: December 2021
- Operating bases: Antalya; Istanbul (2019–2021); Istanbul–Atatürk (1992–2019)
- Frequent-flyer program: OnurExtra
- Subsidiaries: Holiday Europe
- Fleet size: 33
- Destinations: 6 (scheduled)
- Headquarters: Istanbul, Turkey
- Key people: Cankut Bagana (owner); Teoman Tosun (CEO)
- Employees: 1,000 - 5,000
- Website: www.onurair.com/en

Onur Air (Turkish: Onur Air Taşımacılık AŞ, often styled OnurAir or Onurair) was a low-cost airline with its headquarters in the Technical Hangar B at Istanbul Atatürk Airport in Yeşilköy, Istanbul, Turkey. "Onur" means honour in Turkish. It operated mostly domestic scheduled services, as well as charter flights out of its base at Istanbul Airport. In December 2021, it was forced to suspend all operations until further notice and was declared bankrupt in April 2022.

== History ==
=== Early years ===
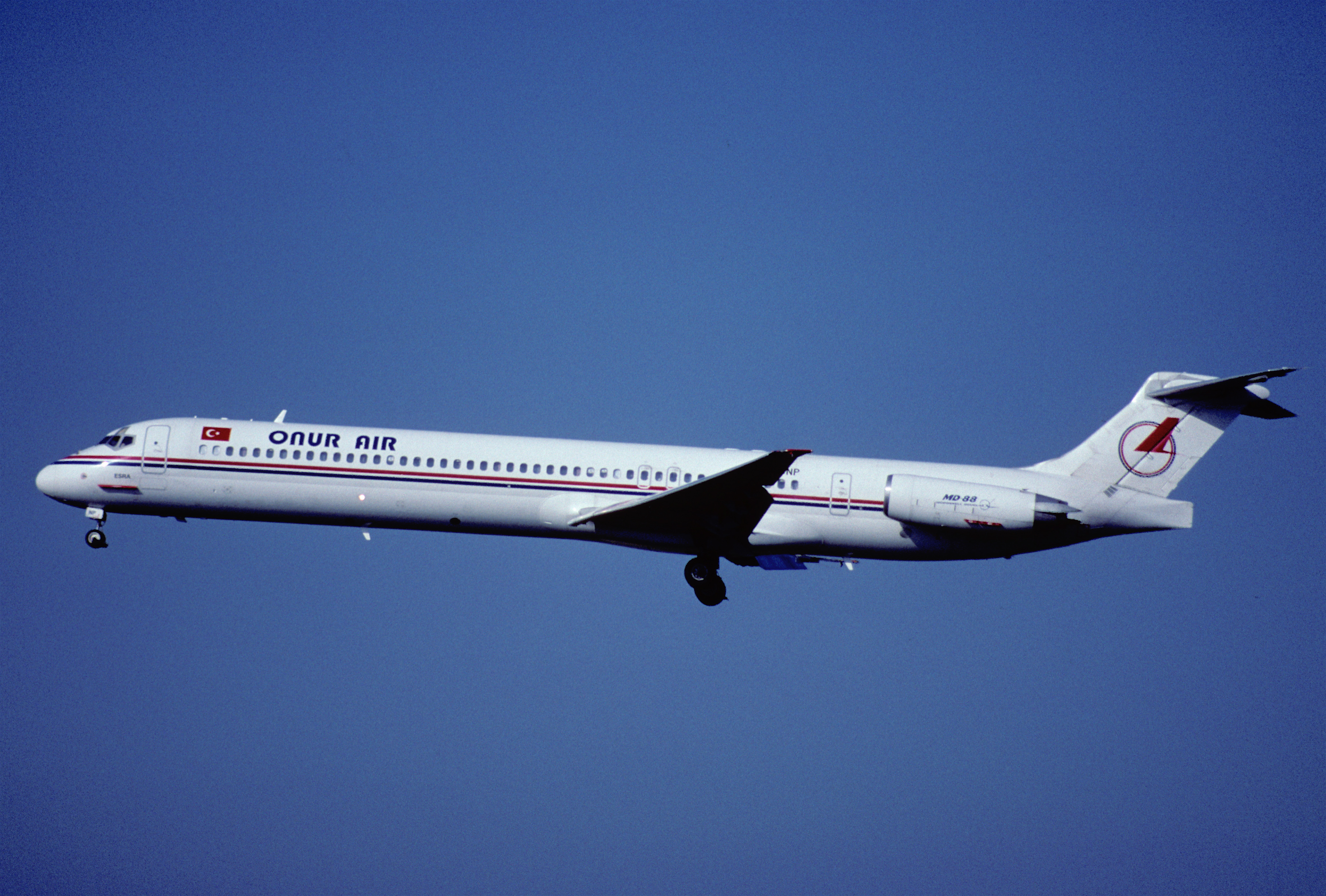
A former Onur Air McDonnell Douglas MD-88 in 2001

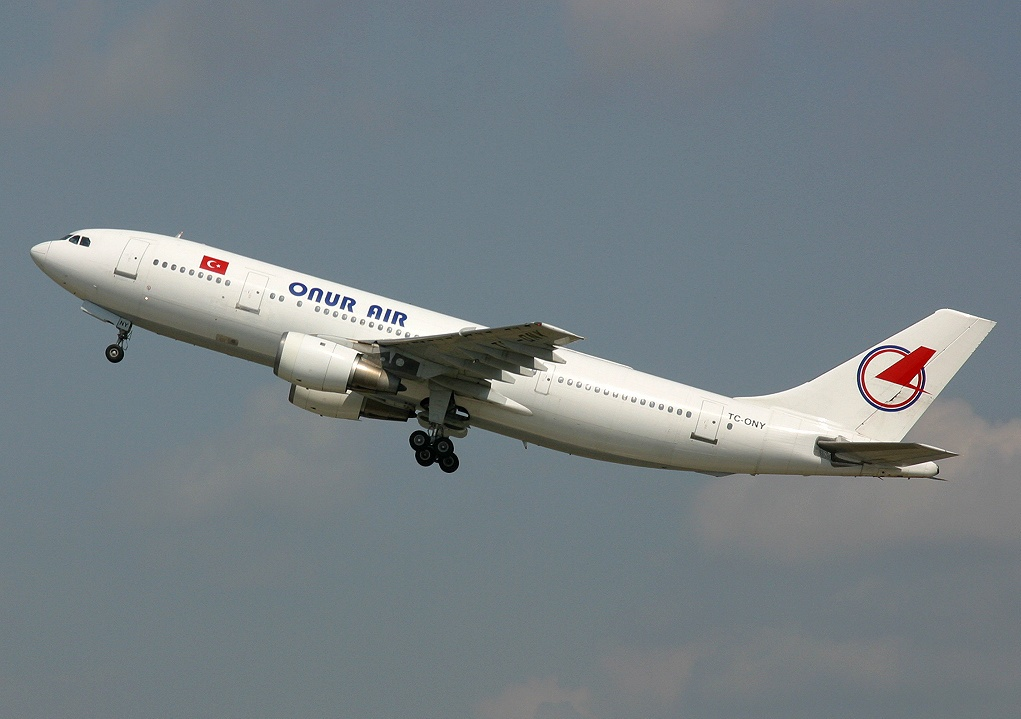
A former Onur Air Airbus A300B2 in 2002

Onur Air was established on 14 April 1992 and started revenue operations using a wet-leased Airbus A320 with a flight to Ercan in North Cyprus on 14 May of that year. Over the next years, the Onurair fleet grew, so that by the end of 1995, it included nine aircraft. Previously its head office was in Florya, Bakırköy, Istanbul.

In 1996, Ten Tour acquired ownership of the airline. By 1997, McDonnell Douglas MD-80 twin-jet airliners had been added to the fleet. Due to a recession, Onur Air had to reduce the size of its fleet to 13 in 1998, and then to nine in 1999. Since then, the airline had expanded again. It has also carried out special full charter flights.

=== Development since the 2000s ===
In May 2005, the airline was withdrawn from the Luftfahrt-Bundesamt, as serious defects on the airline's aircraft had been discovered. As a counter-reaction, Turkey then withdrew the German airlines' landing permits. After protests by the Foreign Office, the entry ban for German aircraft was lifted again. On 14 May, the airline's entry permit was withdrawn by the Swiss and French aviation safety authorities. Until then, Onur Air had been awarded a total of nine certificates by Airbus and Boeing for their maintenance procedures. In the period from July 4 to 6, 2005, the review of the airline was provisionally concluded with a so-called "final meeting" at the home airport of Onur Air in Antalya, in accordance with the requirements from the re-issue of the entry permit.

By 6 April 2019, all of Onur Air's flights from their former base at Atatürk Airport were relocated to the new Istanbul Airport.

In August 2019, Onur Air established a new, partly owned subsidiary named Holiday Europe for leisure flights between Europe and destinations around the Mediterranean. Onur Air provided aircraft and crews for the new brand. In October 2021, the operational license of Holiday Europe has been revoked.

In December 2021, the Turkish aviation authorities did not renew the airline's operational license, suspending all of their operations. Beforehand, negotiations to regain financial stability in the wake of the COVID-19 pandemic failed.

In February 2022, Onur Air's last remaining airworthy aircraft was taken back by its lessor, leaving the airline without a usable fleet. In April 2022, a Turkish court declared the airline bankrupt after legal proceedings of a former employee.

== Destinations ==
By September 2021, prior to the suspension of its licence, Onur Air offered scheduled flights (excluding charter services) to the following destinations:

Country	City	Airport	Notes	Refs
Germany	Cologne/Bonn	Cologne Bonn Airport		
Germany	Düsseldorf	Düsseldorf Airport		
Kuwait	Kuwait City	Kuwait International Airport		
Turkey	Antalya	Antalya Airport		
Turkey	Istanbul	Istanbul Airport	Hub	
	Izmir	Adnan Menderes Airport		
Ukraine	Odesa	Odesa International Airport		
Ireland	Dublin	Dublin International Airport		

== Fleet ==
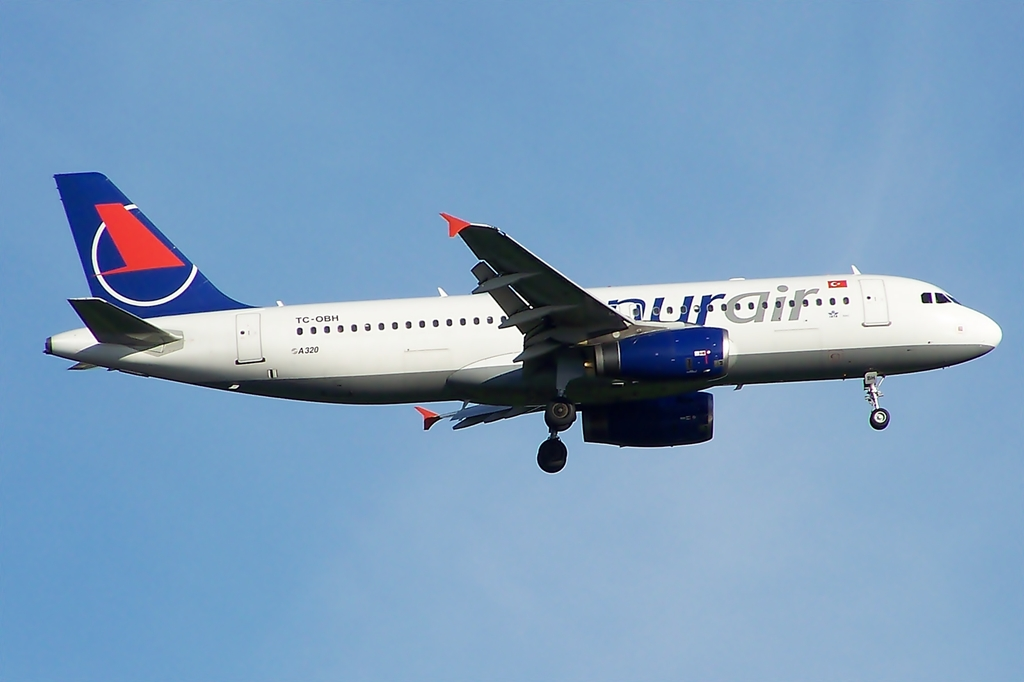
Onur Air Airbus A320-200

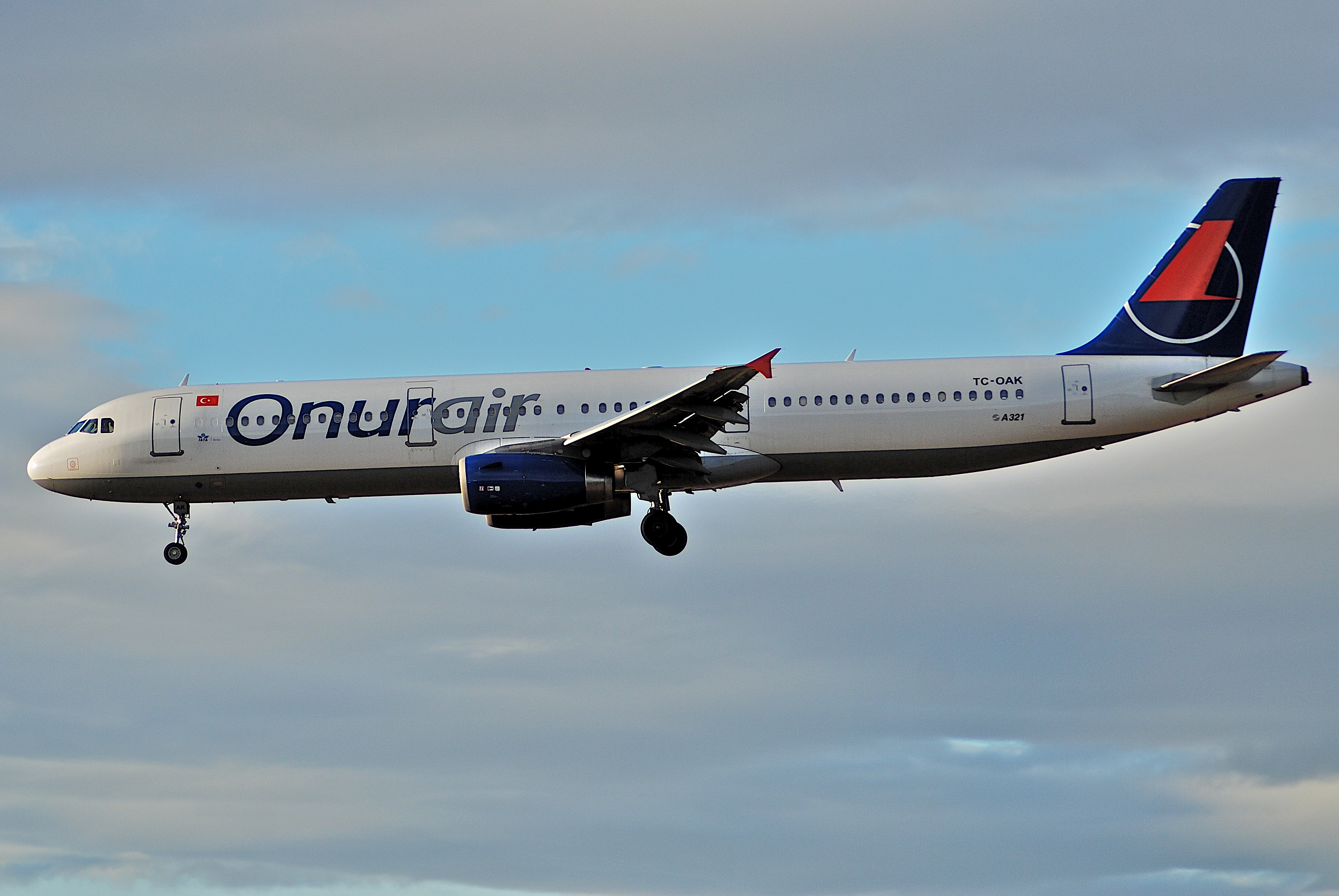
Onur Air Airbus A321-200

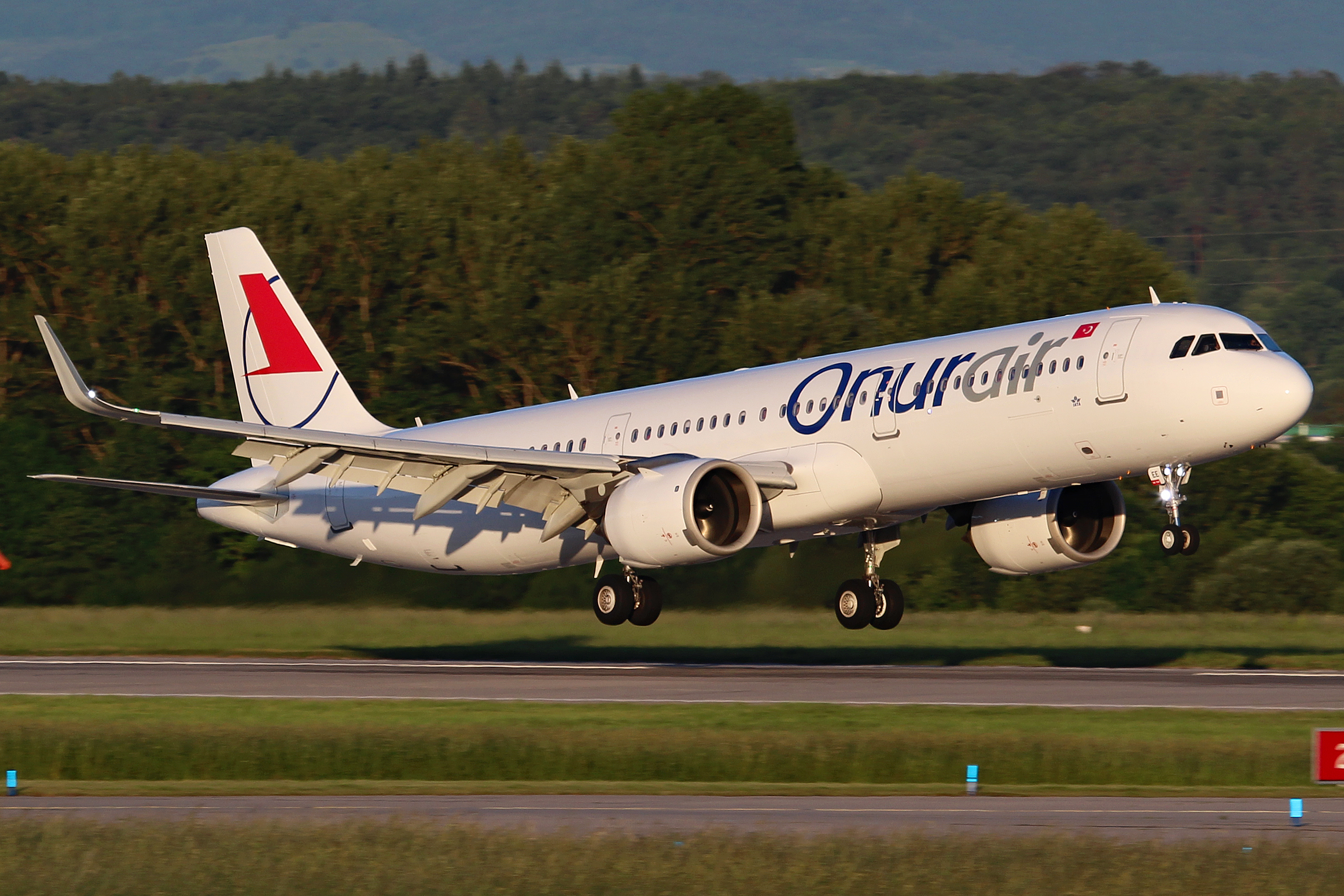
A former Onur Air Airbus A321neo, which was operated for a brief period

Onur Air had operated the following aircraft types:

Aircraft	Total	Introduced	Retired	Notes
Airbus A300B2	2	2001	2006	
Airbus A300B4	5	1997	2006	
Airbus A300-600R	1	2001	2001	Leased from Air Alfa
Airbus A300-600R	7	2006	2013	
Airbus A320-200	35	1992	2021	
Airbus A321-100	2	1996	1999	
Airbus A321-100	4	2005	2020	
Airbus A321-200	18	2003	2020	
Airbus A321neo	2	2019	2020	Taken from Wow Air
Airbus A330-200	12	2016	2021	
Airbus A330-300	5	2015	2021	
McDonnell Douglas MD-82	1	2007	2009	Leased from Bestair
McDonnell Douglas MD-83	4	2005	2010	Sold to Khors Air
McDonnell Douglas MD-88	5	1997	2011	

== Incidents and accidents ==
- On 17 June 2003, Onur Air Flight 2263, a McDonnell Douglas MD-88 (registration TC-ONP) overshot the runway at Groningen Airport Eelde following an aborted take-off. There were no injuries, but the airline was accused of security breaches.
- On 12 May 2005, Onur Air was denied access to Dutch airspace for a month. Several incidents were the cause of the suspension of the airline. Negotiations took place between the Dutch authorities and Onur Air and on 24 May 2005 Onur Air had permission to fly from and to the Netherlands again.
- On 1 January 2007, the cargo hold of a McDonnell Douglas MD-88 aircraft burst open upon landing at Atatürk International Airport, spilling luggage onto the runway.
- On 7 September 2007, an Airbus A321 aircraft lost cabin pressure on a charter flight from Dalaman Airport to Birmingham Airport, resulting in an emergency landing at Atatürk International Airport. Passenger reports included a smoking engine and broken down oxygen masks.
- On 20 August 2011, an Onur Air pilot forgot to contact Munich Air Traffic Control and caused the quick reaction air defence of both Germany and Austria to send four Eurofighter Typhoons to intercept the company's A321.

== See also ==
- List of defunct airlines of Turkey
