= Q5 =

Q5 may refer to:

- Q (TV series), a Spike Milligan BBC series that was known during its first series as "Q5"
- Q5 (band), an American heavy metal group
- BlackBerry Q5
- Quran 5, the 5th chapter of the Islamic Holy book

== Transport ==
- Audi Q5, a compact luxury crossover SUV
- Q5 (New York City bus)
- LNER Class Q5, a class of British 0-8-0 steam locomotives (previously known as NER Classes T & T1)

== Military ==
- Nanchang Q-5 ground attack aircraft
- HMS Farnborough, also known as Q5, was a Q-ship of the First World War
- Q-5 is an alternate designation for the AQM-60 Kingfisher

== See also ==
- 5Q (disambiguation)
