= Holiday Europe =

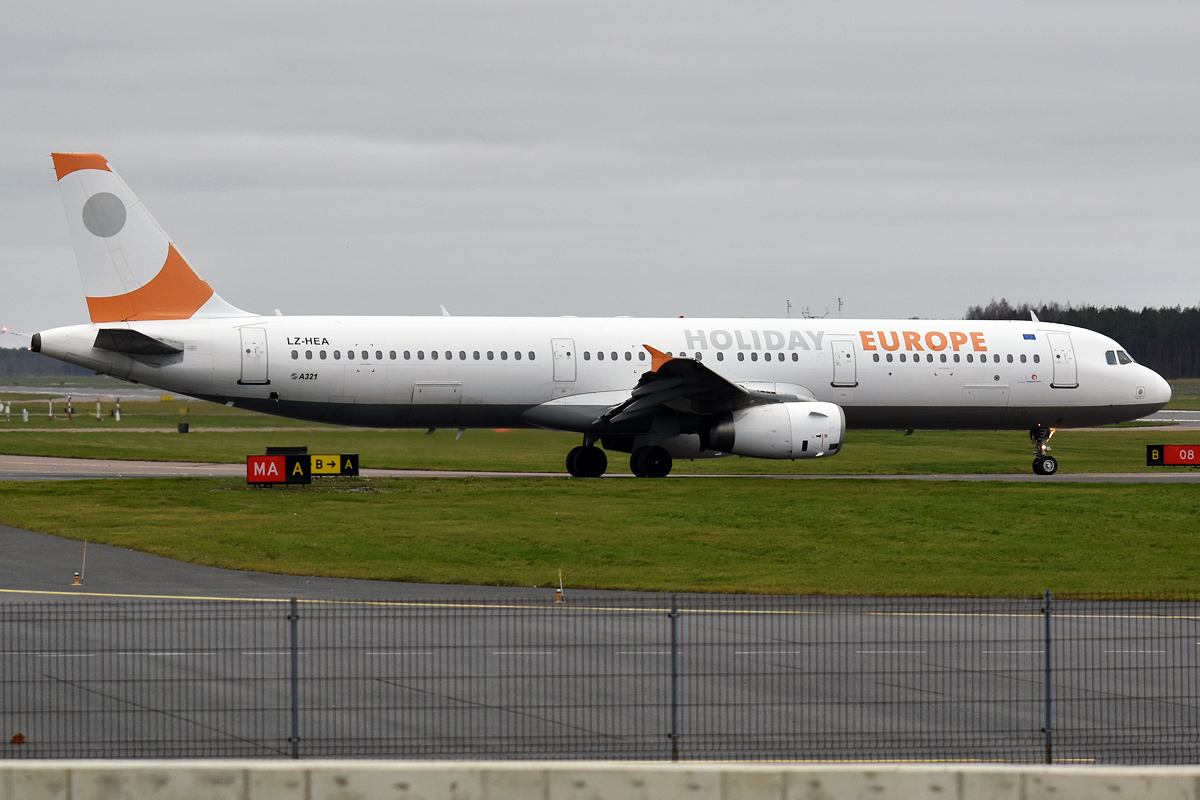
- Airbus A321-200
IATA	ICAO	Call sign
HL	HES	HOLIDAY EUROPE
- Founded: 2019
- Ceased operations: 2022
- Fleet size: 3
- Parent company: Aybars Balabaner (5%); Petko Christoff (5%); Jet Sky Ltd. (90%)
- Headquarters: Sofia, Bulgaria
- Website: holiday-europe.bg

Holiday Europe Limited was a Bulgarian charter airline founded in 2019 and based in Sofia.

== History ==
In the beginning of August 2019, it was announced that Mr. Aybars Balabaner, a German citizen, would invest in the new airline. Onur Air (via Mr. Balabaner) provided the new airline with its first aircraft – an Airbus A321 – and it would continue to support the airline technically and logistically until further notice. Aybars Balabaner owned 95% of Holiday Europe Ltd., the other 5% was owned by Managing Director Petko Christoff. In the end of December 2021, Holiday Europe had a new Ownership, Jet Sky Ltd. that owned 90% of shares of Mr. Aybars Balabaner. On 24 August 2019, the airline received its Air Operating Certificate (AOC).

After flight operations had been suspended since December 2020, the company's AOC was temporarily suspended in October 2021, after ending the cooperation with now defunct Onur Air. As of June 2022, the airline's AOC is no longer suspended but the airline seems no longer operational.

== Destinations ==
The airline operated charter flights out of several European airports to leisure destinations in the Mediterranean, the Canary Islands, Egypt, and UAE.

== Fleet ==
As of March 2021, Holiday Europe operated the following aircraft:

Holiday Europe fleet
Aircraft	In service	Orders	Passengers	Notes
Airbus A321-200	1	—	219	
Total	1	—		
