= Olympus Airways =

Greek airline

IATA	ICAO	Call sign
–	OLY	OLYAIR
- Founded: 7 April 2015
- Commenced operations: 2015
- Ceased operations: 2024
- Fleet size: 2
- Destinations: Worldwide ACMI operator
- Headquarters: Agia Paraskevi, Greece
- Website: olympusairways.gr

Olympus Airways was a Greek charter airline offering ACMI-leasing, charter and ad-hoc flights headquartered in Agia Paraskevi.

== History ==
Olympus Airways secured its Air Operators Certificate (AOC) from the Hellenic Civil Aviation Authority (HCAA) in 2015. The company commenced operations with a single Boeing 737-500 in October 2015 offering charter flights between Greece and Germany. Olympus Airways had since grown its fleet to consist of two Airbus A321-200 passenger aircraft and two Boeing 757-200PCF freight aircraft. Olympus Airways leased their aircraft to other airlines on an ACMI basis. They have operated for the TUI Group and Congo Airways amongst others. The airline was declared bankrupt in 2024.

== Fleet ==
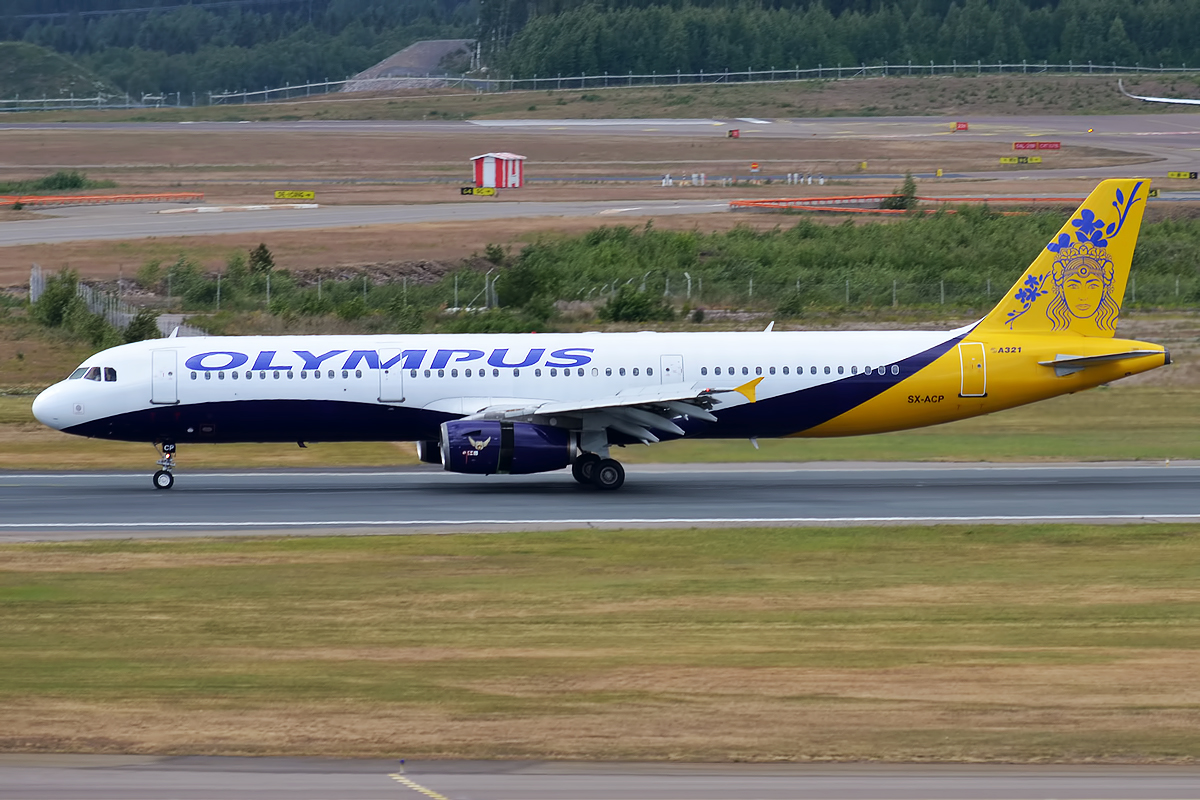
Olympus Airways Airbus A321-200 wearing a hybrid livery inherited from the previous operator Monarch Airlines

As of August 2024, the Olympus Airways fleet consists of the following aircraft:

Olympus Airways fleet
Aircraft	In service	Orders	Passengers
Airbus A330-200	0	1	220
Airbus A320-200	0	–	180
Total	0	1	
