= Panorama Airways =

Airline of Uzbekistan

IATA	ICAO	Call sign
5P	UZP	—
- Founded: 2021
- Ceased operations: 2024
- Hubs: Tashkent
- Fleet size: 2
- Destinations: 8
- Headquarters: Tashkent, Uzbekistan
- Website: panoramaairways.uz/

Panorama Airways was an airline based in Tashkent, Uzbekistan.

== Destinations ==
As of August 2023, Panorama Airways serves the following destinations:

Country	City	Airport	Notes	Refs
Russia	Moscow	Zhukovsky International Airport		
Saudi Arabia	Medina	Prince Mohammad bin Abdulaziz International Airport		
Uzbekistan	Bukhara	Bukhara International Airport		
Uzbekistan	Fergana	Fergana International Airport		
Uzbekistan	Namangan	Namangan Airport		
Uzbekistan	Samarkand	Samarkand International Airport		
Uzbekistan	Tashkent	Islam Karimov Tashkent International Airport	Hub	
United Arab Emirates	Dubai	Dubai International Airport		

== Fleet ==
As of August 2023 Panorama Airways fleet consists of the following aircraft:

Panorama Airways fleet
Aircraft	In service	Orders	Seats	Notes
Airbus A320-200	2	1	174	
Total	2	1		
