= Jonika Airlines =

Ukrainian scheduled airline

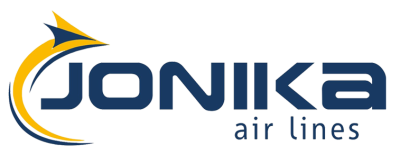
| IATA | ICAO | Call sign |
|---|---|---|
| JO | JNK | JONIKA |
- Founded: 2018
- Commenced operations: June 2018
- Ceased operations: 2022
- Hubs: Kyiv International Airport (Zhuliany)
- Fleet size: 4
- Destinations: 2
- Headquarters: Kyiv, Ukraine

Jonika Airlines was a Ukrainian scheduled and charter airline based at Kyiv International Airport (Zhuliany). As of January 2026, the airline's current status is listed as "Out of Business".

== History ==
Founded in 2018, the airline started operations after receiving the first Boeing 737-400 in July 2018; a second model was added to the fleet in April 2019. In 2020 the company acquired Airbus A319-100 and Boeing 737-300.

== Destinations ==
Jonika Airlines serves the following destinations as of December 2021:

- Kyiv – Kyiv International Airport (Zhuliany) base
- Athens – Athens International Airport

== Fleet ==
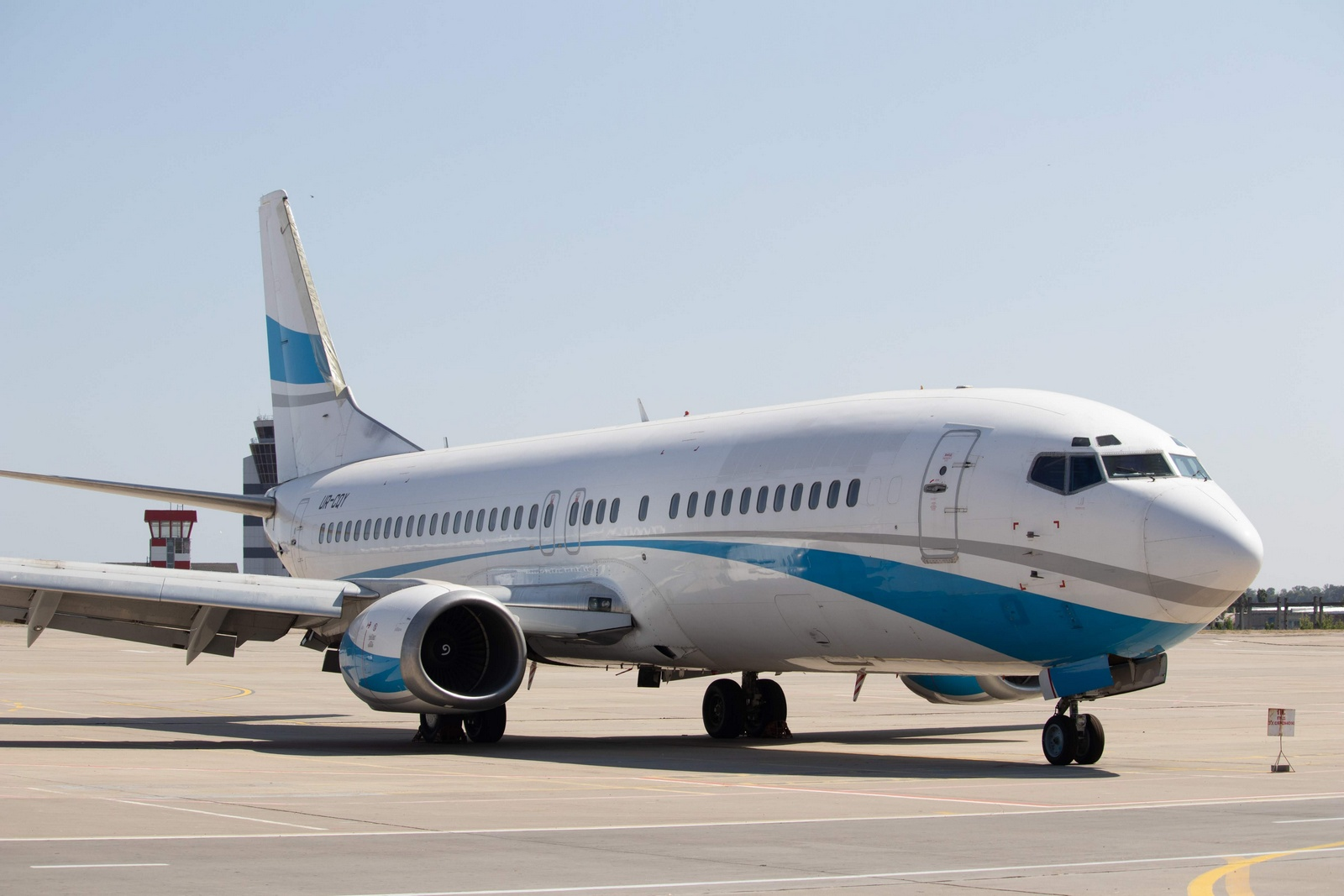
A Jonika Airways Boeing 737-400

As of August 2025, Jonika Airlines operates the following aircraft:

Jonika Airlines fleet
| Aircraft | In service | Orders | Notes |
|---|---|---|---|
| Airbus A319-100 | 1 | — | |
| Boeing 737-300 | 1 | — | |
| Boeing 737-400 | 2 | — | |
| Total | 4 | — | |

== See also ==
- List of airlines of Ukraine
