= Malta MedAir =

Maltese airline

IATA	ICAO	Call sign
MT	MMO	MALIT
- Commenced operations: 27 March 2018
- AOC #: MT-55
- Operating bases: Malta International Airport
- Fleet size: 3
- Parent company: Malta Air Travel Co Ltd
- Headquarters: Luqa, Malta
- Key people: Mark Sammut (Executive Chairman); Paul Bugeja (Chief Executive Officer)
- Website: www.maltamedair.com

Malta MedAir is a European-based airline registered in Malta, which flies under a Maltese air operator's certificate (AOC). Malta Medair is a full member of the European Regions Airline Association (ERA).

== Fleet ==
=== Current fleet ===
As of July 2026, Malta MedAir operates the following aircraft:

Malta Medair fleet
Aircraft	In service	Orders	Passengers			Notes
Aircraft	In service	Orders	J	Y	Total	Notes
Airbus A320	3	—	12	150	162	
Airbus A320neo	—	3	12	162	174	
Total	3	3				

=== Fleet development ===
The fleet of Malta Medair consists of two Airbus A320-200 aircraft operated for Medsky Airways, 9H-MSA and 9H-MSB and one aircraft operating flights for the company, 9H-MMO, which at the moment is stored in Malta. The airline has ordered three A320neo aircraft.

=== Former fleet ===
As of August 2025, Malta MedAir operated 3 Airbus A320.
