= Airbus A321 =

Airliner, stretched model of the A320 family

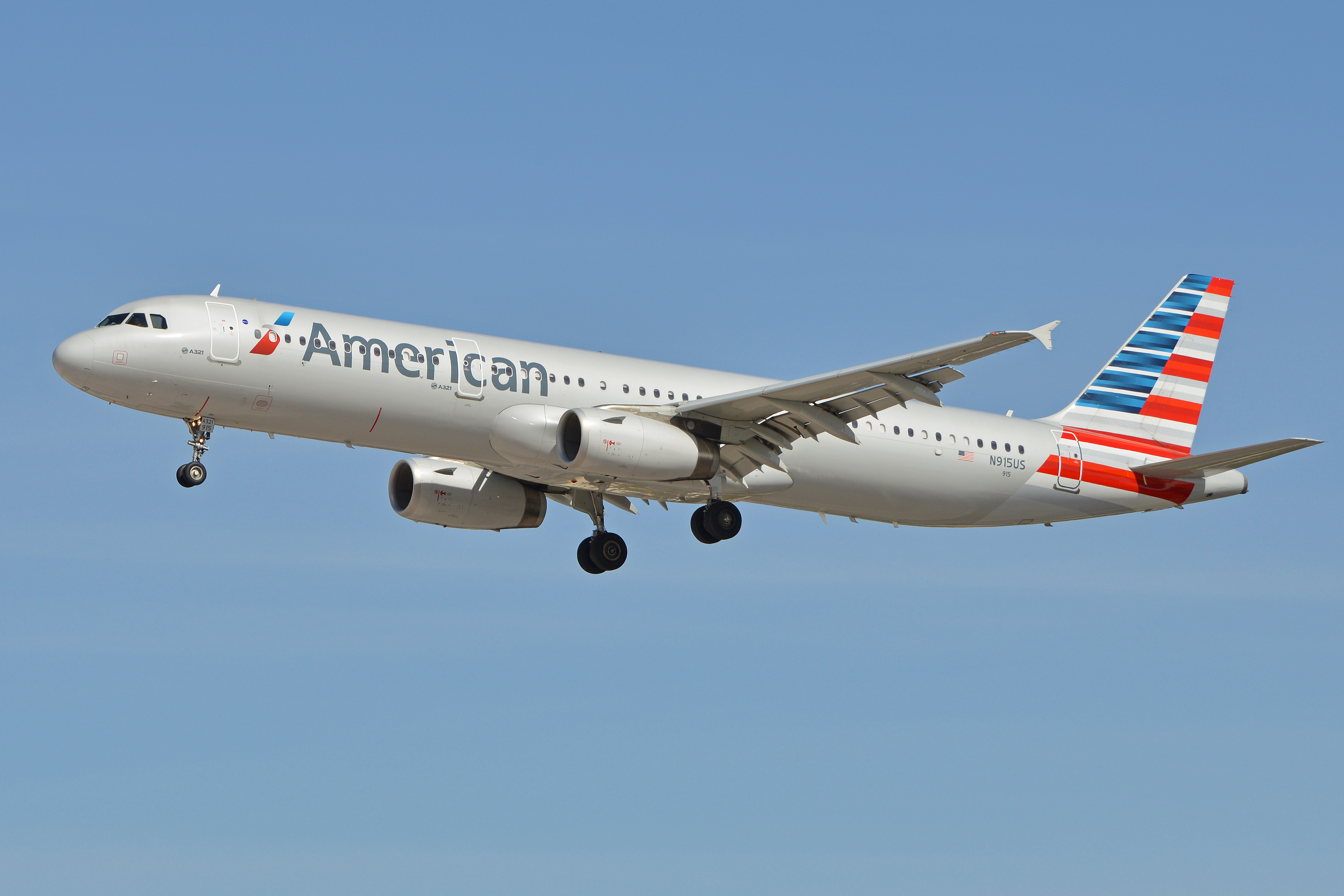
- An A321-200 of American Airlines, the largest operator

General information
- Type: Narrow-body jet airliner
- National origin: Multi-national (Note: Final assembly in China, France, Germany and the United States.)
- Manufacturer: Airbus
- Status: In service
- Primary users: American Airlines Delta Air Lines; IndiGo; China Southern Airlines
- Number built: 3,536 as of 30 June 2025

History
- Manufactured: 1992–2021 (A321ceo); 2014–present (A321neo)
- Introduction date: 27 January 1994 with Lufthansa
- First flight: 11 March 1993
- Developed from: Airbus A320
- Developed into: Airbus A321neo

The Airbus A321 is a member of the Airbus A320 family of short to medium range, narrow-body, commercial passenger twin engine jet airliners; (Note: Airbus was originally a consortium of European aerospace companies named, Airbus Industrie, and is now fully owned by Airbus, originally named EADS. Airbus' name has been Airbus SAS since 2001.) it carries 185 to 239 passengers. It has a stretched fuselage which was the first derivative of the baseline A320 and entered service in 1994, about six years after the original A320. The aircraft shares a common type rating with all other Airbus A320-family variants, allowing A320-family pilots to fly the aircraft without the need for further training.

In December 2010, Airbus announced a new generation of the A320 family, the A320neo (new engine option). The similarly lengthened fuselage A321neo variant offers new, more efficient engines, combined with airframe improvements and the addition of winglets (called Sharklets by Airbus). The aircraft delivers fuel savings of up to 15%. The A321neo carries up to 244 passengers, with a maximum range of 4,000 nmi (7,400 km; 4,600 mi) for the long-range version when carrying no more than 206 passengers.

Final assembly of the aircraft takes place in Hamburg, Germany, Mobile, Alabama, United States, Tianjin, China, and Toulouse, France. As of June 2025, a total of 3,536 A321 airliners have been delivered, of which 3,453 are in service. In addition, another 5,312 A321neo aircraft are on firm order. American Airlines is the largest operator of the Airbus A321 with 302 examples in its fleet.

== Development ==
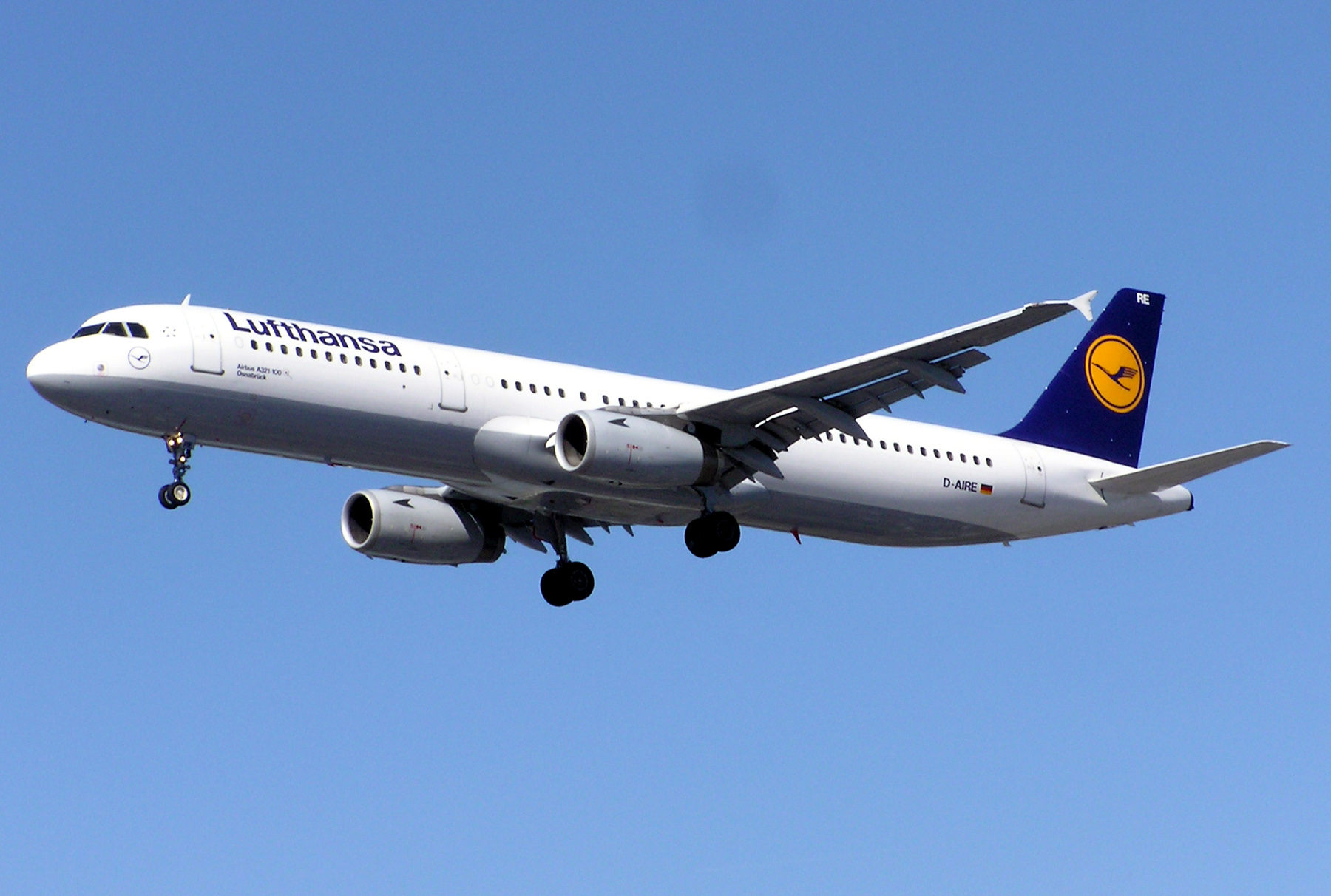
The A321 entered service in January 1994 with Lufthansa; seen here is an A321-100

The Airbus A321 was the first derivative of the A320, also known as the Stretched A320, A320-500 and A325. Its launch came on 24 November 1988, around the same time as the A320 entered service, after commitments for 183 aircraft from 10 customers were secured.

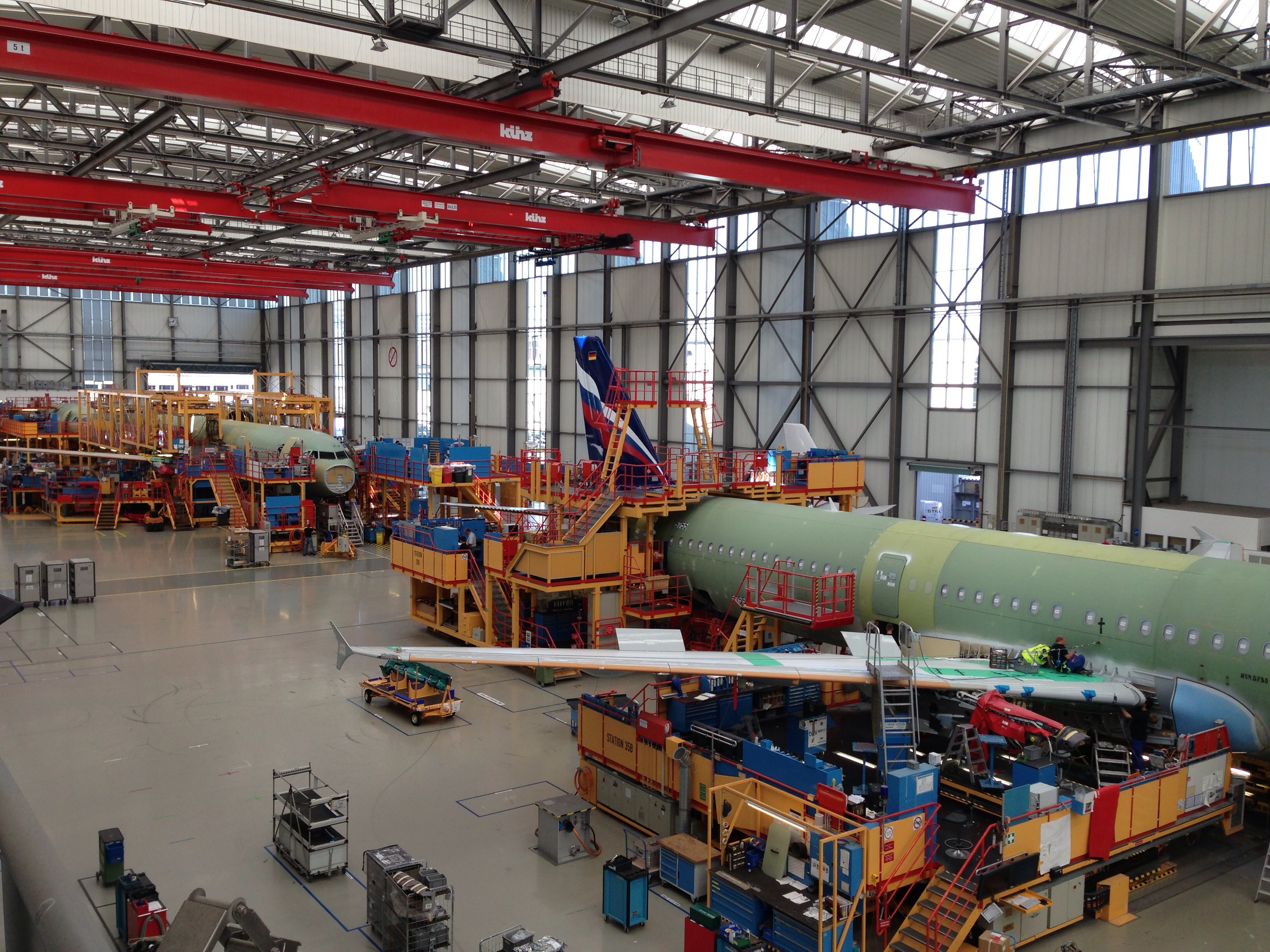
An Airbus A321 on final assembly line 3 in the Airbus Hamburg-Finkenwerder plant

The maiden flight of the Airbus A321 came on 11 March 1993, when the prototype, registration F-WWIA, flew with IAE V2500 engines; the second prototype, equipped with CFM56-5B turbofans, flew in May 1993. Lufthansa and Alitalia were the first to order the stretched Airbuses, with 20 and 40 aircraft requested, respectively. The first of Lufthansa's V2500-A5-powered A321s arrived on 27 January 1994, while Alitalia received its first CFM56-5B-powered aircraft on 22 March 1994. The A321-100 entered service in January 1994 with Lufthansa.

Final assembly for the A321 was carried out in Germany (then West Germany), a first for any Airbus. This came after a dispute between the French, who claimed that the move would incur $150 million (€135 million) in unnecessary expenditure associated with the new plant, and the Germans, who claimed that it would be more productive for Airbus in the long run. The second production line was located in Hamburg, which later produced the smaller Airbus A318 and A319. For the first time, Airbus entered the bond market, through which it raised $480 million (€475 million) to finance development costs. An additional $180 million (€175 million) was borrowed from European Investment Bank and private investors.

The A321 is the largest variant of the A320 family. The A321-200's length exceeds 44.5 m (146 ft), increasing maximum takeoff weight (MTOW) to 93,000 kg (205,000 lb). Its wingspan of 31.0 m (101 feet 8 inches) remained unchanged, supplementing various wingtip devices. Two suppliers provided turbofan engines for the A321: CFM International with its CFM56 and International Aero Engines with the V2500 engine, both in the thrust range of 133–147 kN (30,000–33,000 lb_{f}).

Over 30 years since launch, the A321 MTOW grew by 20% from the 83 t (183,000 lb) -100 to the 101 t (223,000 lb) A321XLR, seating became 10% more dense with 244 seats, up by 24, and range doubled from 2,300 to 4,700 nmi (4,300 to 8,700 km; 2,600 to 5,400 mi). By 2019, 4,200 had been ordered—one-quarter of all Airbus single-aisles—including 2,400 neos, one-third of all A320neo orders.

== Design ==
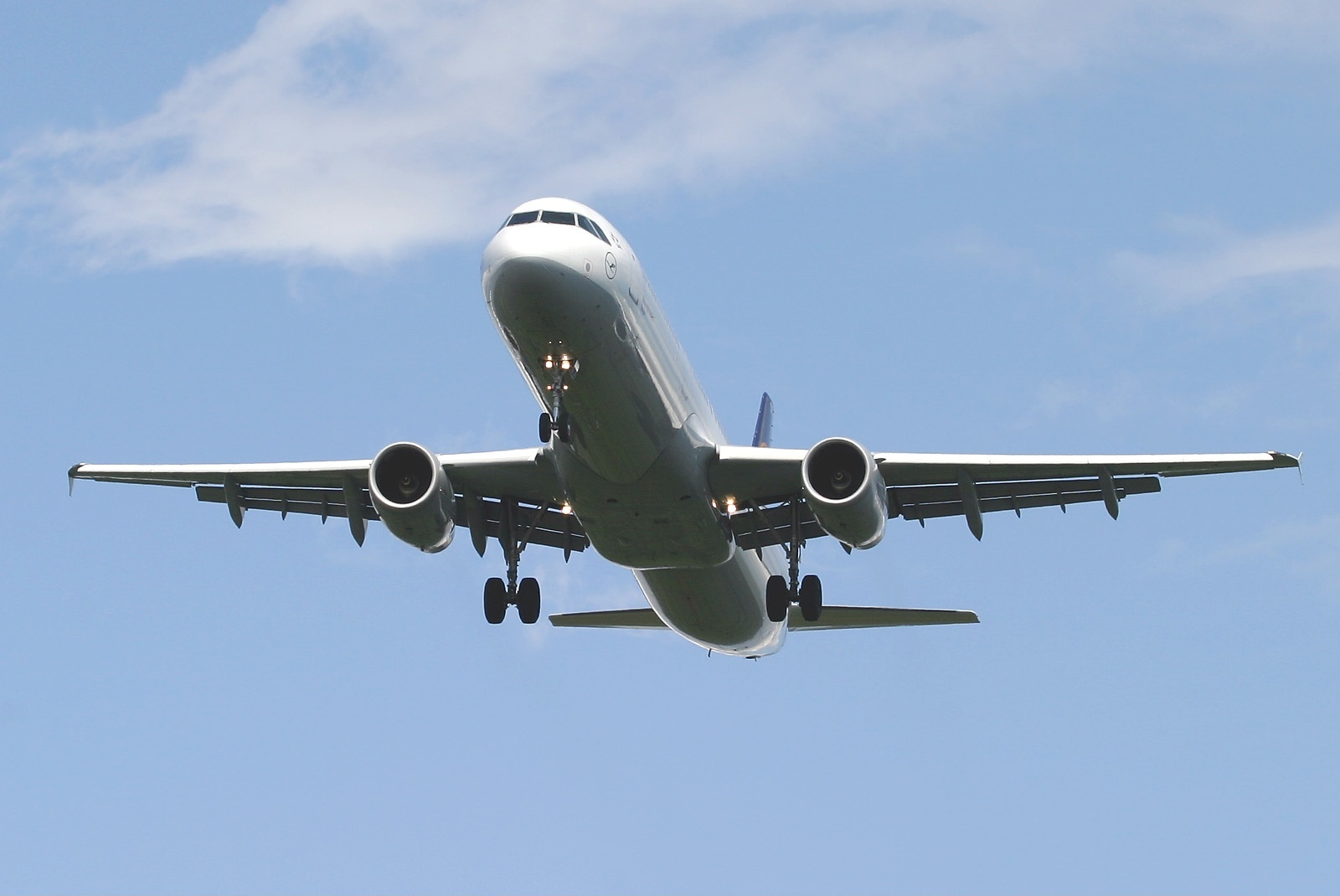
The A321 has double-slotted flaps.

The Airbus A321 is a narrow-body (single-aisle) aircraft with a retractable tricycle landing gear, powered by two wing pylon-mounted turbofan engines. It is a low-wing cantilever monoplane with a conventional tail unit having a single vertical stabilizer and rudder. Changes from the A320 include a fuselage stretch and some modifications to the wing. The fuselage was lengthened by a 4.27 m (14 ft 0 in) plug ahead of the wing and a 2.67 m (8 ft 9 in) plug behind it, making the A321 6.94 m (22 ft 9 in) longer than the A320. The length increase required the overwing window exits of the A320 to be converted into door exits and repositioned in front of and behind the wings. To maintain performance, double-slotted flaps and minor trailing edge modifications were included, increasing the wing area from 124 m^{2} (1,330 sq ft) to 128 m^{2} (1,380 sq ft). The centre fuselage and undercarriage were reinforced to accommodate a 9,600 kg (21,200 lb) increase in maximum takeoff weight, taking it to 83,000 kg (183,000 lb).

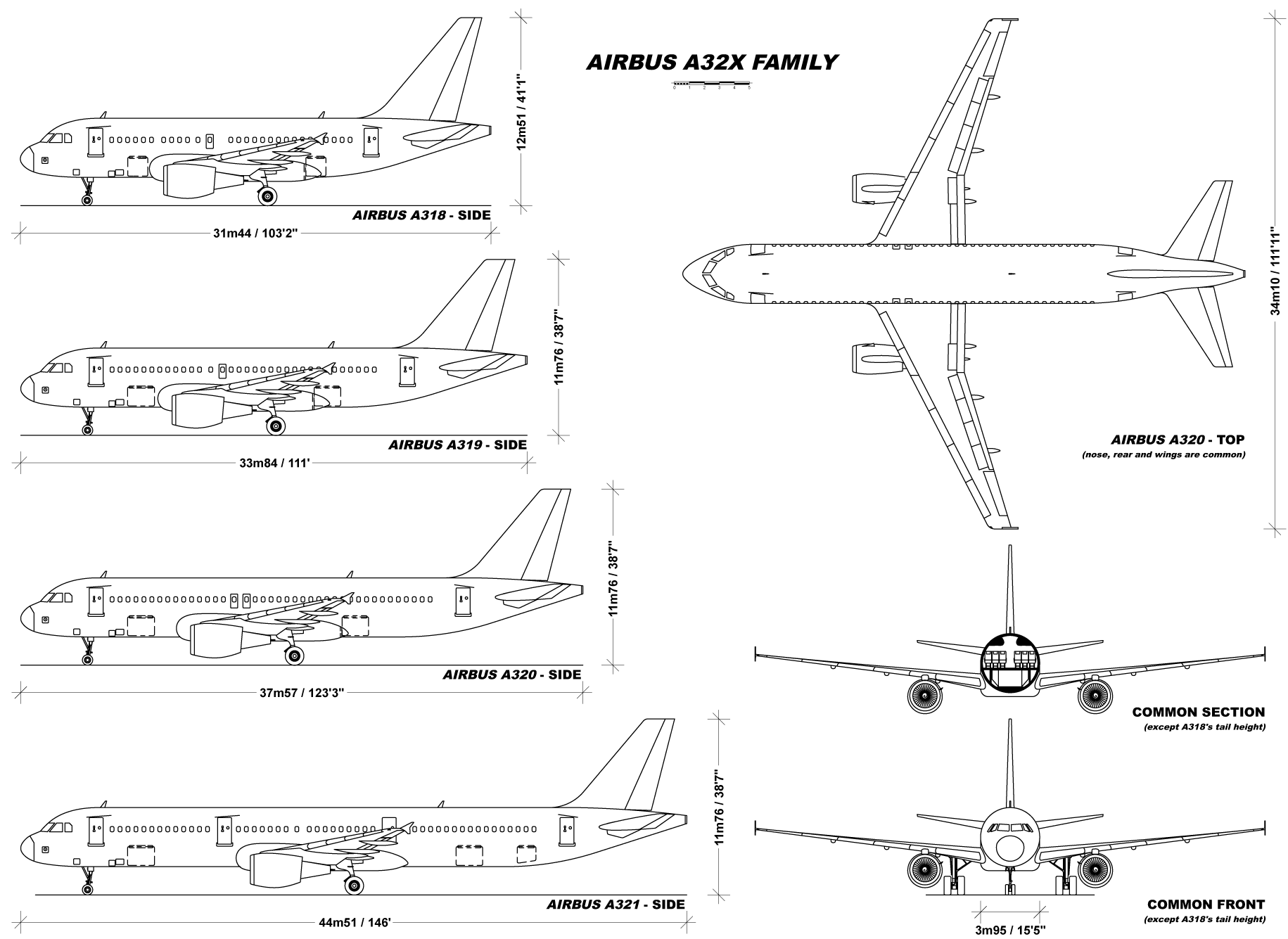
Airbus A32X family

== Variants ==
The A320's overwing exits (foreground) were replaced by type 'C' doors in front of and behind the wings for the A321 (background), although the latest A321neos with the Cabin Flex (ACF) arrangement kept the overwing exits.

The variants of A321ceo and A321neo family aircraft are mainly defined by its cabin layout and fuel configuration.

Airbus offers customers only one fuel configuration for the A321-100.

Airbus offers customers 3 different fuel configuration options for the A321-200: customers can select up to 2 auxiliary fuel tanks (ACT) in the after cargo hold.

Airbus offers customers 4 different fuel configuration options for the standard A321neo: customers can select up to 1 auxiliary fuel tank (ACT) in the front cargo hold and up to 2 ACTs in the after cargo hold. The A321neo-ACF with 97 tonnes of MTOW and up to 3 optional ACTs is exclusively branded as A321LR (Long Range).

Airbus offers customers 2 different fuel configuration options for the A321XLR: customers can select up to 1 ACT in the front cargo hold.

A321ceo & A321neo family variants
| Marketing name | Cabin | Fuel config | | Fuel capacity | Cargo |
| Marketing name | Cabin | Front | Rear | Fuel capacity | Cargo |
|---|---|---|---|---|---|
| A321-100 CFMI | STD | — | — | 18,880 kg (41,620 lb) | 10*LD3-45 |
| A321-100 IAE | STD | — | — | 18,605 kg (41,017 lb) | 10*LD3-45 |
| A321-200 CFMI | STD | — | — | 18,880 kg (41,620 lb) | 10*LD3-45 |
| A321-200 CFMI | STD | — | 1ACT | 21,330 kg (47,020 lb) | 9*LD3-45 |
| A321-200 CFMI | STD | — | 2ACT | 23,780 kg (52,430 lb) | 8*LD3-45 |
| A321-200 IAE | STD | — | — | 18,605 kg (41,017 lb) | 10*LD3-45 |
| A321-200 IAE | STD | — | 1ACT | 21,055 kg (46,418 lb) | 9*LD3-45 |
| A321-200 IAE | STD | — | 2ACT | 23,505 kg (51,820 lb) | 8*LD3-45 |
| A321neo | STD | — | — | 18,440 kg (40,650 lb) | 10*LD3-45 |
| A321neo | STD | — | 1ACT | 20,890 kg (46,050 lb) | 9*LD3-45 |
| A321neo | STD | — | 2ACT | 23,340 kg (51,460 lb) | 8*LD3-45 |
| A321neo ACF/LR | ACF | — | — | 18,510 kg (40,810 lb) | 10*LD3-45 |
| A321neo ACF/LR | ACF | — | 1ACT | 20,960 kg (46,210 lb) | 9*LD3-45 |
| A321neo ACF/LR | ACF | — | 2ACT | 23,410 kg (51,610 lb) | 8*LD3-45 |
| A321LR | ACF | 1ACT | 2ACT | 25,860 kg (57,010 lb) | 7*LD3-45 |
| A321XLR | ACF | — | 1RCT | 28,753 kg (63,390 lb) | 8*LD3-45 |
| A321XLR | ACF | 1ACT | 1RCT | 31,202 kg (68,789 lb) | 7*LD3-45 |

=== A321-100 ===
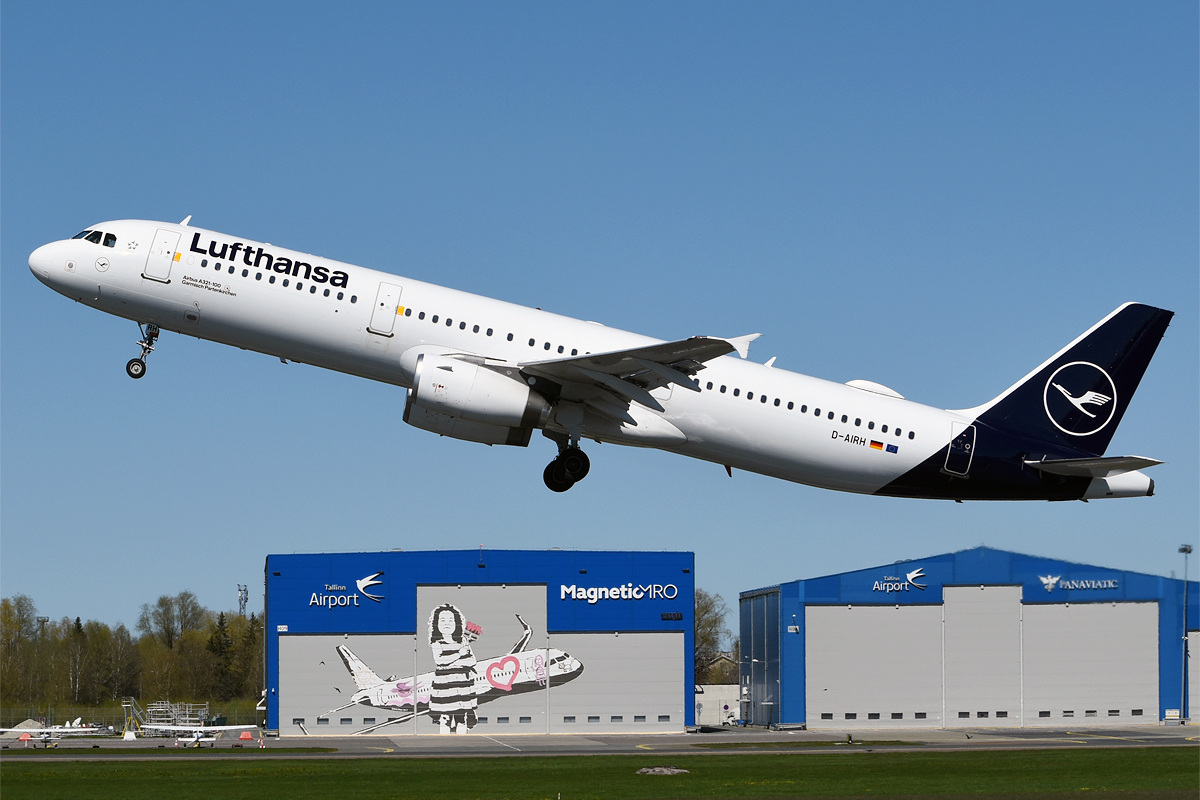
Lufthansa's first A321-100, as seen in 2024

The original derivative of the A321, the A321-100, had shorter range than the A320 because no extra fuel tank was added to compensate for the increased weight. The MTOW of the A321-100 is 83,000 kg (183,000 lb). The A321-100 entered service with Lufthansa in 1994. Only about 90 were produced; some aircraft were later modified through the installation of Additional Centre Tanks (ACTs), increasing fuel capacity and range to levels similar to the later A321-200 variant.

=== A321-200 ===
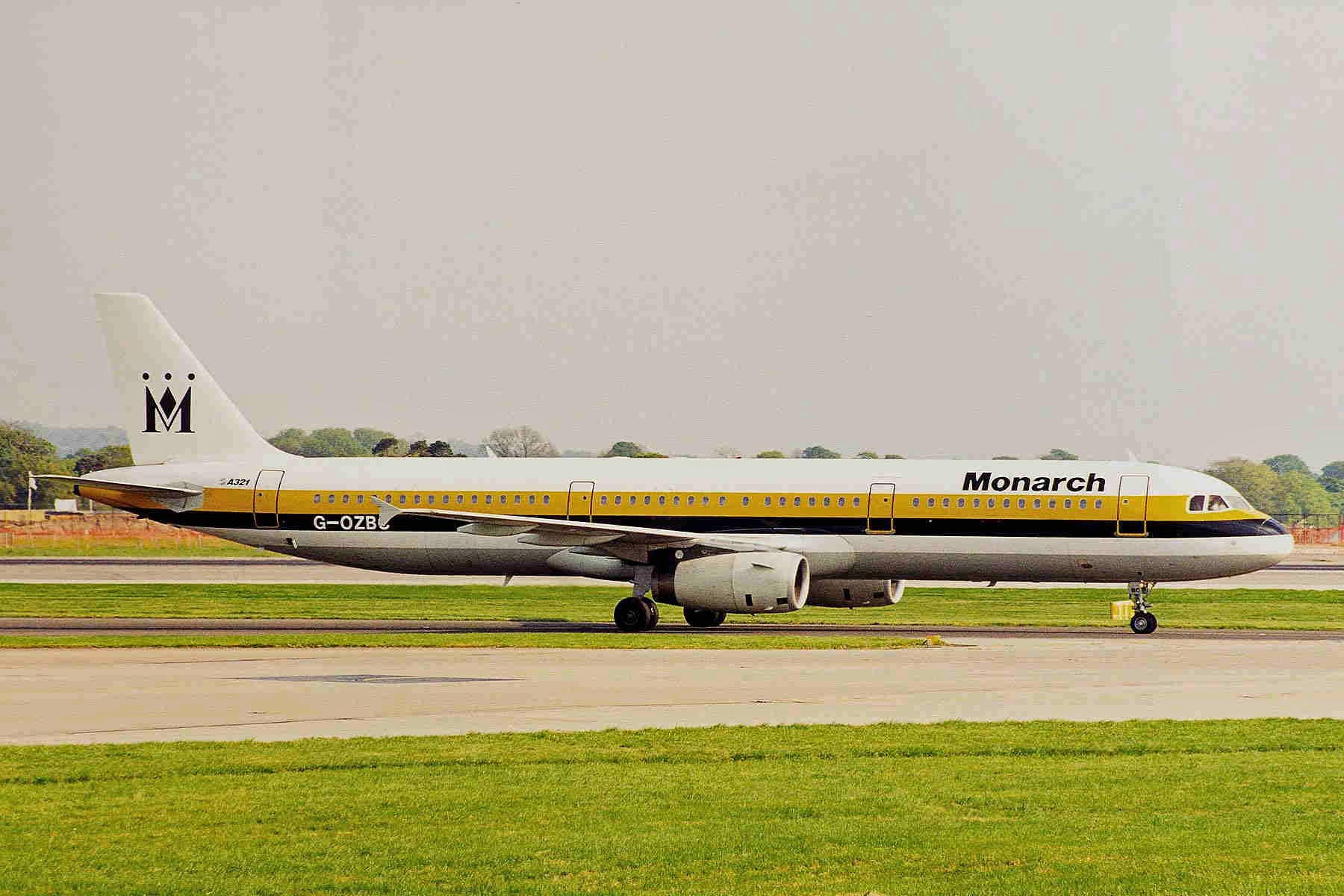
First A321-200 of Monarch Airlines in 1999

Airbus began development of the heavier and longer-range A321-200 in 1995 to give the A321 full-passenger transcontinental US range. This was achieved through higher thrust engines (V2533-A5 or CFM56-5B3), minor structural strengthening, and an increase in fuel capacity with the installation of one or two optional 2,990 L (790 US gal) tanks in the rear underfloor hold. The additional fuel tanks increased the total capacity to 30,030 L (7,930 US gal). These modifications also increased the maximum takeoff weight of the A321-200 to 93,000 kg (205,000 lb). This variant first flew in December 1996, and entered service with Monarch Airlines in April 1997. The following month, Middle East Airlines received its first A321-200 in May 1997. Its direct competitors include the 757-200 and the 737-900/900ER.

=== A321neo ===
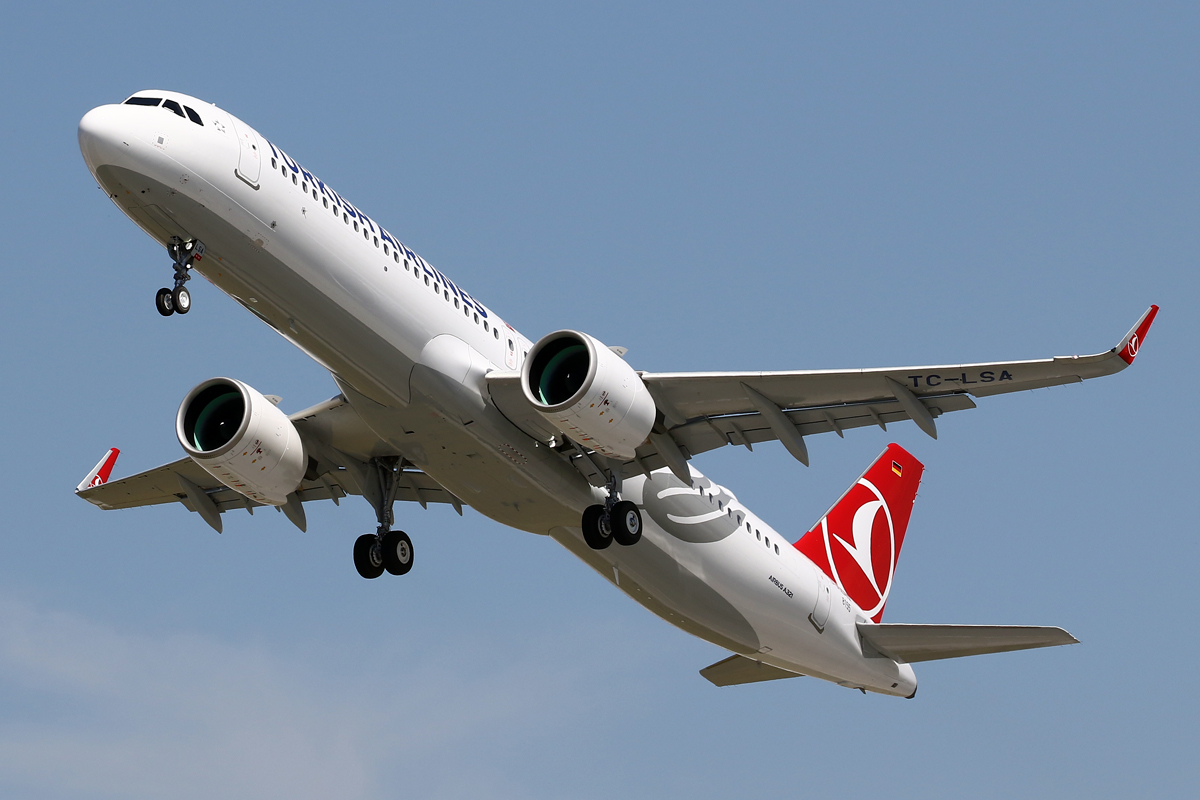
The A321neo has larger CFM LEAP or PW1000G turbofans. This Turkish Airlines A321neo has PW1000G engines.

On 1 December 2010, Airbus launched the A320neo family (neo for New Engine Option) with 500 nmi (930 km; 580 mi) more range and 15% better fuel efficiency, thanks to new CFM International LEAP-1A or Pratt & Whitney PW1000G engines and large sharklets. The lengthened A321neo prototype made its first flight on 9 February 2016. It received its type certification on 15 December 2016. The first entered service in May 2017 with Virgin America.

==== A321LR ====
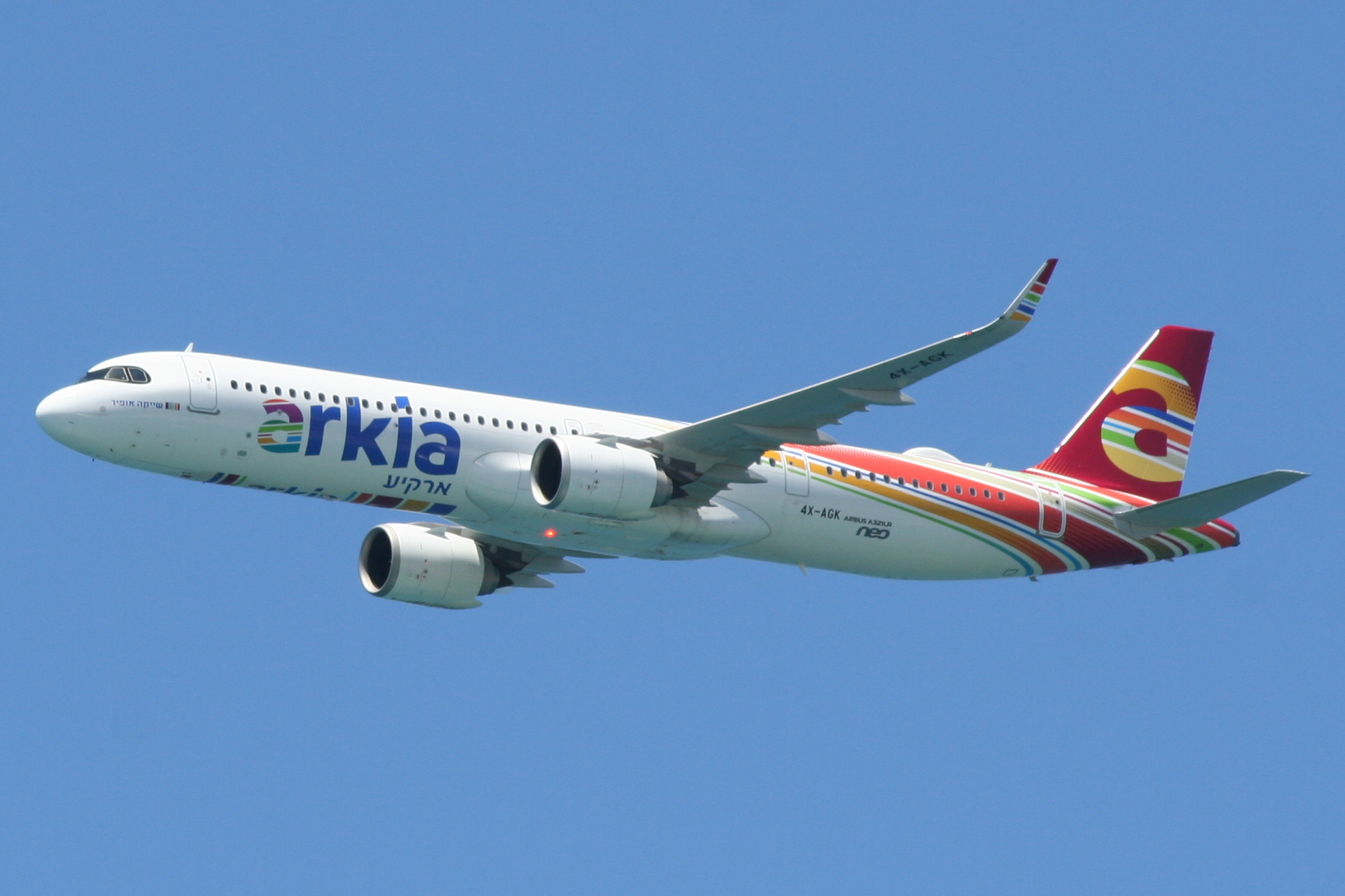
An Arkia A321LR in 2019

From October 2014, Airbus started marketing a longer range, 97 t (214,000 lb) maximum takeoff weight (MTOW) variant with options for up to three removable auxiliary fuel tanks (ACT), and launched it as the A321LR (Long Range) on 13 January 2015, with a range of 4,000 nmi (7,400 km; 4,600 mi) in a two-class, 206 seat configuration, giving it 100 nmi (190 km; 120 mi) more operational range than a Boeing 757-200.

On 31 January 2018, the variant completed its first flight, and on 2 October 2018, Airbus announced its certification. On 13 November 2018, the first A321LR went to operator Arkia.

==== A321XLR ====
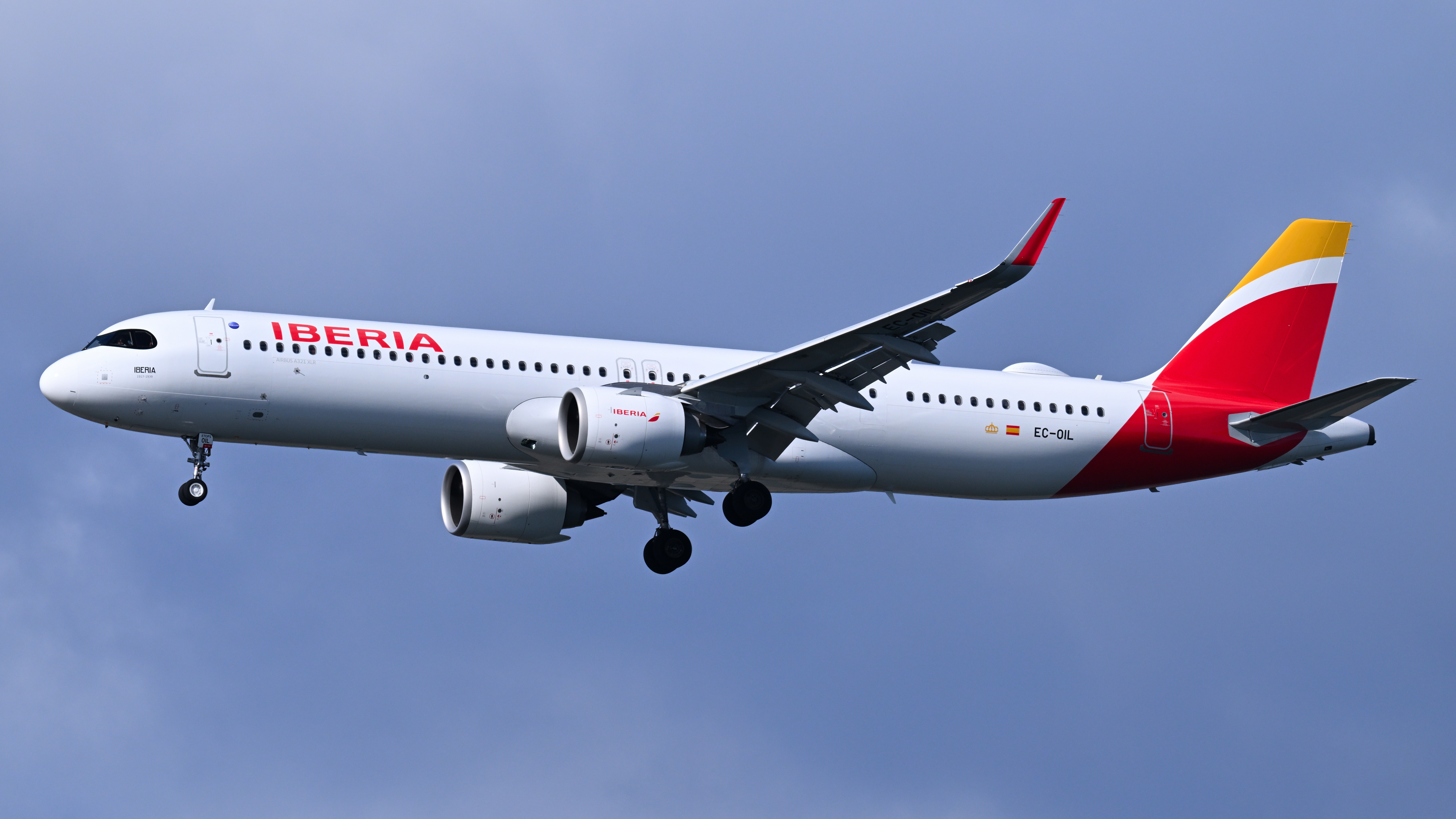
An A321XLR of launch customer Iberia

The A321XLR is initially an A321LR variant with a further increased MTOW intended to compete with the Boeing NMA, which has since been put on hold.

The variant was launched at the June 2019 Paris Air Show, with a range of 4,700 nmi (8,700 km; 5,400 mi). It included a new permanent Rear Centre Tank (RCT) for more fuel, a strengthened landing gear for a 101 t (223,000 lb) MTOW and an optimised wing trailing-edge flap configuration to preserve take-off performance.

In June 2022, the A321XLR completed its first flight. Aer Lingus was originally to be the launch customer of the A321XLR. However, due to internal pilot contract disputes, the first A321XLR was instead delivered to Iberia on October 30, 2024. The first flight with passengers was on November 6, 2024. The first long-haul flight with passengers was on 14 November 2024, from Madrid to Boston.

==== Freighter conversion ====
While no freighter version of the A321 has been built new by Airbus, a first attempt of converting used A320/321 into freighter aircraft was undertaken by Airbus Freighter Conversion GmbH. The program, however, was canceled in 2011 before any aircraft were converted.

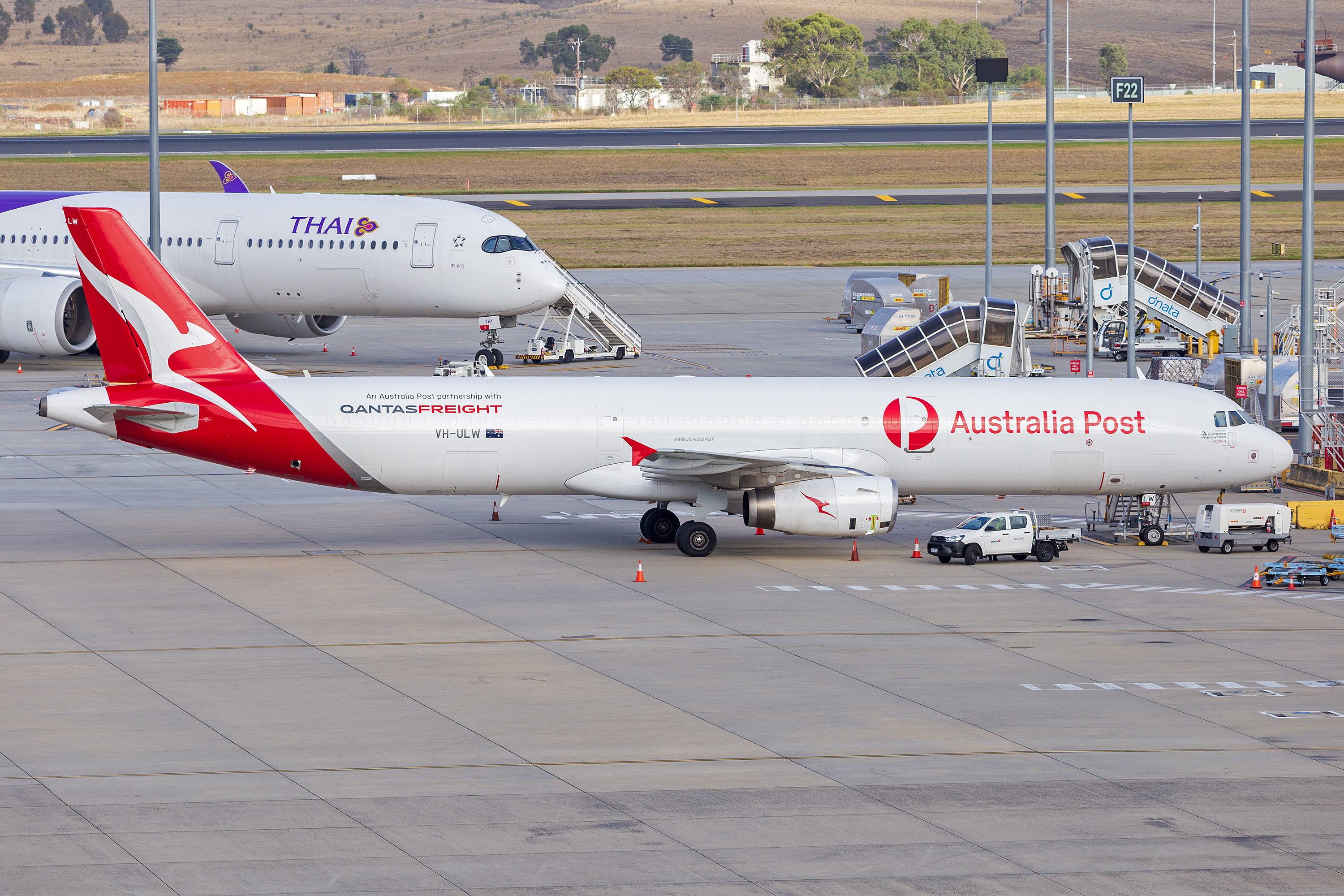
An Australia Post-branded A321P2F of Qantas Freight

On 17 June 2015, ST Aerospace signed agreements with Airbus and EFW for a collaboration to launch the A320/A321 passenger-to-freighter (P2F) conversion programme. The initial converted aircraft first flew on 22 January 2020. On 27 October 2020, the first A321-200P2F was delivered to launch operator Qantas Freight.

The A321-200PCF is a passenger to freighter conversion, developed by Precision Conversions and certificated in 2021.

Sine Draco Aviation also offers an A321 passenger-to-freighter conversion programme; its first conversion is expected for the first quarter of 2022.

On 15 March 2022, Lufthansa Cargo started to operate its A321F, a cargo variant of the A321.

==== A321 MPA ====
The A321 MPA (Maritime Patrol Aircraft) is a military maritime patrol and anti-submarine warfare derivative under development, based on the long-range commercial A321XLR variant. Unveiled at the Euronaval defense exhibition in November 2024, the concept was designed to meet a French military requirement. In February 2025, the French Defence Procurement Agency (DGA) awarded a 24-month definition and risk-assessment contract to Airbus Defence and Space as the prime contractor, in partnership with Thales Group, to prepare for the type's full-scale development and production launch at the end of 2026.

The aircraft is planned to enter service with the French Navy between 2030 and 2040 to replace its aging fleet of Dassault Atlantique 2 patrol aircraft, operating out of Lann-Bihoué naval air base, and compete globally in the long-range category against the Boeing P-8 Poseidon. International interest in the platform grew following its presentation at the Singapore Airshow in February 2026.

Billed by Airbus as a "flying frigate," the A321 MPA utilizes the extended fuselage and increased payload capacity of the A321XLR to house a dedicated internal weapons bay in an underfloor ventral gondola located behind the wing. This configuration minimizes aerodynamic drag while allowing the internal carriage of anti-submarine torpedoes and the FMAN/FMC future anti-ship and cruise missiles. The aircraft is designed for high-maneuverability at low altitudes and will be equipped with a comprehensive Thales sensor suite. This suite features a latest-generation active electronically scanned array (AESA) search radar, acoustic systems utilizing passive and active sonobuoys, a tail-mounted magnetic anomaly detector (MAD), electronic support measures (ESM), and integrated self-protection systems.

== Operators ==
A Vietnam Airlines Airbus A321ceo retrofitted with the "Sharklets" wingtip devices.

As of June 2025, 3,453 Airbus A321 aircraft (1701 ceo+1752 neo) were in service with more than 100 operators. American Airlines and Delta Air Lines operate the largest A321 fleets of 302 and 203 aircraft, respectively.

=== Orders and deliveries ===
| Type | Orders | | Deliveries | | | | | | | | | | | |
| Type | Total | Backlog | Total | 2025 | 2024 | 2023 | 2022 | 2021 | 2020 | 2019 | 2018 | 2017 | 2016 | 2015 |
|---|---|---|---|---|---|---|---|---|---|---|---|---|---|---|
| A321ceo | 1,784 | — | 1,784 | — | — | — | — | 22 | 9 | 38 | 99 | 183 | 222 | 184 |
| A321neo | 7,064 | 5,312 | 1,752 | 143 | 361 | 317 | 264 | 199 | 178 | 168 | 102 | 20 | — | — |
| (A321) | (8,848) | (5,312) | (3,536) | (143) | (361) | (317) | (264) | (221) | (187) | (206) | (201) | (203) | (222) | (184) |

| Type | Deliveries | | | | | | | | | | | | | | | | | | | | |
| Type | 2014 | 2013 | 2012 | 2011 | 2010 | 2009 | 2008 | 2007 | 2006 | 2005 | 2004 | 2003 | 2002 | 2001 | 2000 | 1999 | 1998 | 1997 | 1996 | 1995 | 1994 |
|---|---|---|---|---|---|---|---|---|---|---|---|---|---|---|---|---|---|---|---|---|---|
| A321ceo | 150 | 102 | 83 | 66 | 51 | 87 | 66 | 51 | 30 | 17 | 35 | 33 | 35 | 49 | 28 | 33 | 35 | 22 | 16 | 22 | 16 |
| A321neo | — | — | — | — | — | — | — | — | — | — | — | — | — | — | — | — | — | — | — | — | — |
| (A321) | (150) | (102) | (83) | (66) | (51) | (87) | (66) | (51) | (30) | (17) | (35) | (33) | (35) | (49) | (28) | (33) | (35) | (22) | (16) | (22) | (16) |

Data as of June 2025

== Accidents and incidents ==
For the Airbus A321, 32 aviation accidents and incidents have occurred, including six hull-loss accidents or criminal occurrences with a total of 377 fatalities as of August 2019.

== Specifications ==
| Variant | A321 | A321neo | A321LR | A321XLR |
|---|---|---|---|---|
| Cockpit crew | Two | | | |
| 2-class seats | 185 (16F @ 36 in, 169Y @ 32 in) | 206 (16J @ 36 in + 190Y @ 30 in) | | |
| 1-class max. | 220 @ 28 in | 220 @ 28 in (Original); 244 @ 28 in (Cabin-Flex) | 244 @ 28 in | |
| Cargo capacity | 51.70 m^{3} (1,826 cu ft) / 10×LD3-45s (Note: no additional centre tank) | | | |
| Length | 44.51 m (146 ft) | | | |
| Wingspan | 35.80 m (117 ft 5 in) (Note: with sharklets) | | | |
| Wing | 128 m^{2} (1,380 ft^{2}) area, 25° sweep | | | |
| Height | 11.76 m (38.6 ft) | | | |
| Fuselage | 3.95 by 4.14 m (13.0 by 13.6 ft) width × height, 3.70 m (12.1 ft) wide cabin | | | |
| Max. takeoff weight | 93.5 t (206,000 lb) | | 97 t (213,800 lb) | 101 t (223,000 lb) |
| Max. payload | 25.3 t (56,000 lb) | 25.5 t (56,200 lb) | | |
| Op. empty weight | 48.5 t (107,000 lb) | 50.1 t (110,500 lb) | | |
| Fuel capacity | 24,050–30,030 L (6,350–7,930 US gal; 5,290–6,610 imp gal) | 23,490–29,474 L (6,205–7,786 US gal; 5,167–6,483 imp gal) (Note: 0–2 additional centre tank) | 23,490–32,853 L (6,205–8,679 US gal; 5,167–7,227 imp gal) (Note: 0–3 additional centre tank) | 36,628–39,748 L (9,676–10,500 US gal; 8,057–8,743 imp gal) |
| Engines (×2) | CFM56-5B, 68.3 in (1.73 m) fan IAE V2500-A5, 63.5 in (1.61 m) fan | CFM LEAP-1A, 78 in (1.98 m) fan PW1100G-JM, 81 in (2.06 m) fan | | |
| Max. thrust (×2) | 133–142.34 kN (29,900–32,000 lb_{f}) | 143.05–147.28 kN (32,160–33,110 lb_{f}) | | |
| Speed | Cruise: Mach 0.78 (450 kn; 833 km/h; 518 mph); Max.: Mach 0.82 (473 kn; 876 km/h; 544 mph) | | | |
| Ceiling | 39,100–39,800 ft (11,900–12,100 m) | | | |
| Typical range | 3,200 nmi (5,930 km; 3,680 mi) (Note: sharklets, typical passengers and bags) | 3,500 nmi (6,480 km; 4,030 mi) | 4,000 nmi (7,410 km; 4,600 mi) (Note: with 206 passengers) | 4,700 nmi (8,700 km; 5,410 mi) |

=== Engines ===
| Aircraft model | Certification date | Engines | Take-off thrust | Max. continuous |
|---|---|---|---|---|
| A321-111 | 27 May 1994 | CFM56-5B1 | 133.44 kN (30,000 lb_{f}) | 129.40 kN (29,090 lb_{f}) |
| A321-112 | 15 February 1994 | CFM56-5B2 or 5B2/P | 137.89 kN (31,000 lb_{f}) | 129.40 kN (29,090 lb_{f}) |
| A321-131 | 17 December 1993 | IAE V2530-A5 | 133.00 kN (29,900 lb_{f}) | 119.88 kN (26,950 lb_{f}) |
| A321-211 | 20 March 1997 | CFM56-5B3 or 5B3/P or 5B3/2P | 142.34 kN (32,000 lb_{f}) | 129.40 kN (29,090 lb_{f}) |
| A321-212 | 31 August 2001 | CFM56-5B1 or 5B1/P or 5B1/2P | 133.44 kN (30,000 lb_{f}) | 129.40 kN (29,090 lb_{f}) |
| A321-213 | 31 August 2001 | CFM56-5B2 or 5B2/P | 137.89 kN (31,000 lb_{f}) | 129.40 kN (29,090 lb_{f}) |
| A321-231 | 20 March 1997 | IAE V2533-A5 | 140.55 kN (31,600 lb_{f}) | 119.88 kN (26,950 lb_{f}) |
| A321-232 | 31 August 2001 | IAE V2530-A5 | 133.00 kN (29,900 lb_{f}) | 119.88 kN (26,950 lb_{f}) |
| A321-251N | 15 December 2016 | CFM LEAP-1A32 | 143.05 kN (32,160 lb_{f}) | 119.88 kN (26,950 lb_{f}) |
| A321-252N | 18 December 2017 | CFM LEAP-1A30 | 143.05 kN (32,160 lb_{f}) | 119.88 kN (26,950 lb_{f}) |
| A321-253N | 3 March 2017 | CFM LEAP-1A33 | 143.05 kN (32,160 lb_{f}) | 119.88 kN (26,950 lb_{f}) |
| A321-271N | 15 December 2016 | PW1133G-JM | 147.28 kN (33,110 lb_{f}) | 145.81 kN (32,780 lb_{f}) |
| A321-272N | 23 May 2017 | PW1130G-JM | 147.28 kN (33,110 lb_{f}) | 145.81 kN (32,780 lb_{f}) |
| A321-251NX | 22 March 2018 | CFM LEAP-1A32 | 143.05 kN (32,160 lb_{f}) | 119.88 kN (26,950 lb_{f}) |
| A321-252NX | 22 March 2018 | CFM LEAP-1A30 | 143.05 kN (32,160 lb_{f}) | 119.88 kN (26,950 lb_{f}) |
| A321-253NX | 22 March 2018 | CFM LEAP-1A33 | 143.05 kN (32,160 lb_{f}) | 119.88 kN (26,950 lb_{f}) |
| A321-271NX | 22 March 2018 | PW1133G-JM | 147.28 kN (33,110 lb_{f}) | 145.81 kN (32,780 lb_{f}) |
| A321-272NX | 22 March 2018 | PW1130G-JM | 147.28 kN (33,110 lb_{f}) | 145.81 kN (32,780 lb_{f}) |

== See also ==
Related development

- Airbus A321neo
- Airbus A318
- Airbus A319
- Airbus A320 family
- Airbus A320neo family

Aircraft of comparable role, configuration, and era

- Boeing 737-900
- Boeing 737 MAX 10
- Boeing 757
- Irkut MC-21
- Tupolev Tu-204

Related lists

- List of Airbus A320 operators
- List of jet airliners
