= Ethiopian Airlines fleet =

List of aircraft operated by Ethiopian Airlines

Ethiopian Airlines operates a fleet of Airbus A350, Boeing 737, Boeing 767, Boeing 777, Boeing 787 and Bombardier Dash Q-400 aircraft.

== Current fleet ==
Ethiopian Airlines current fleet

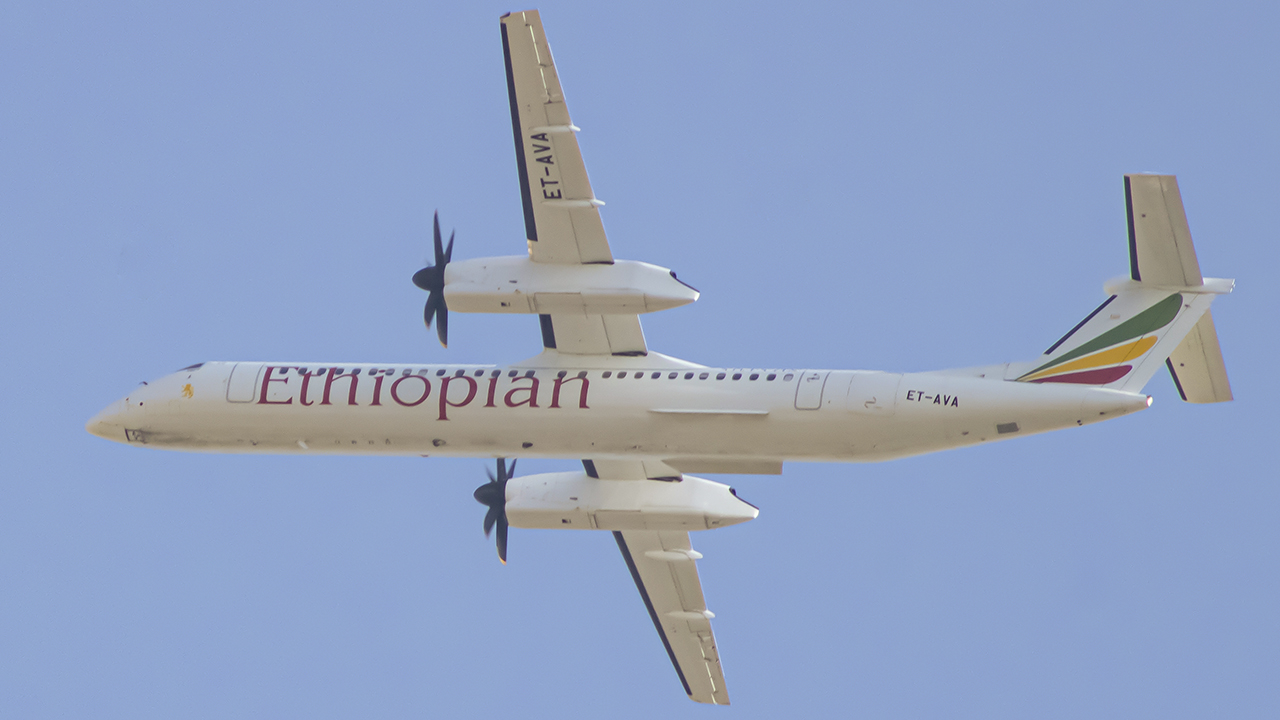
De Havilland Canada Dash 8

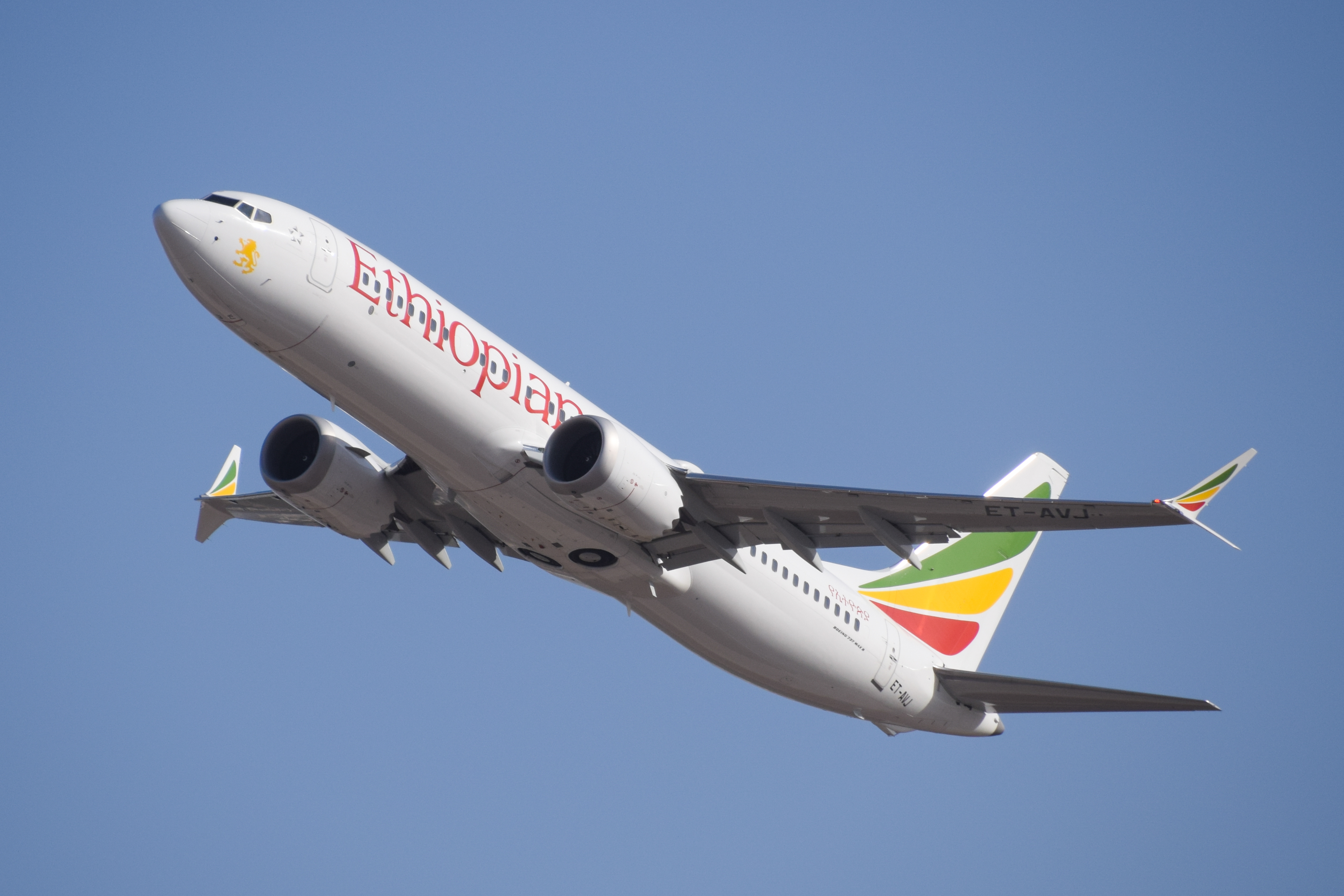
Boeing 737 MAX 8

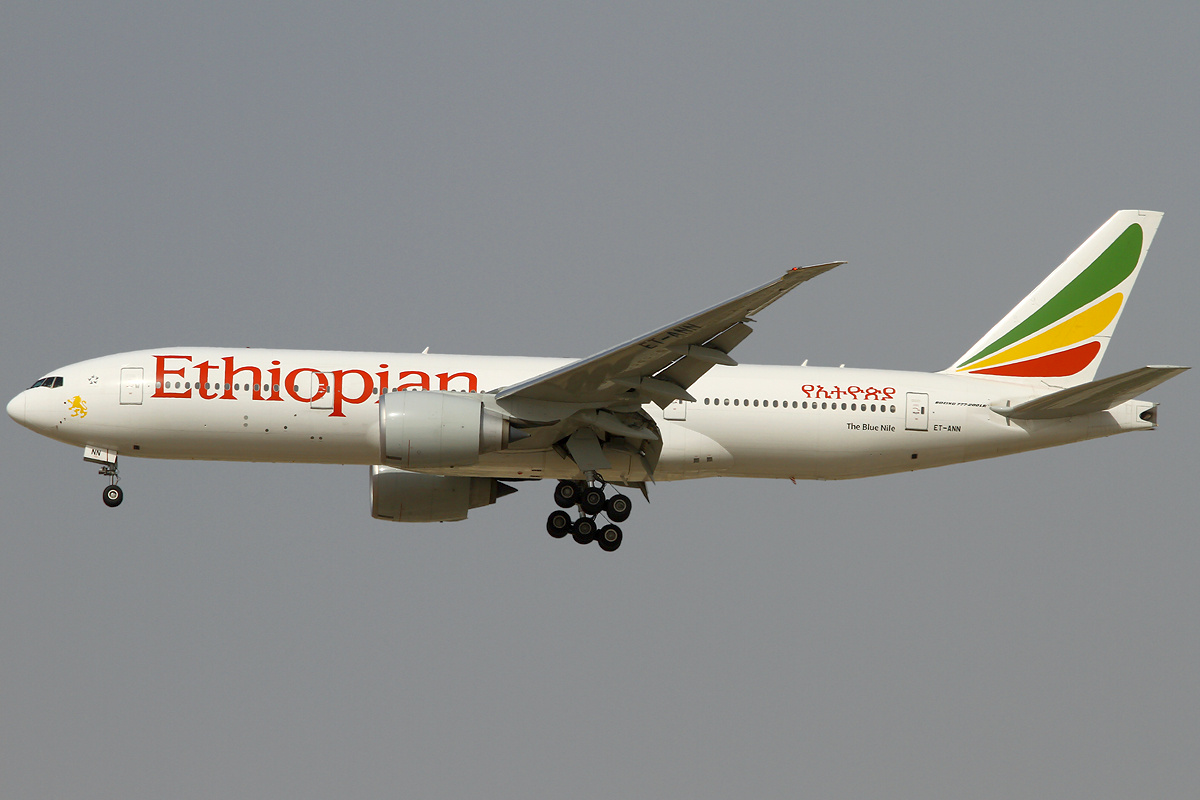
Boeing 777-200LR

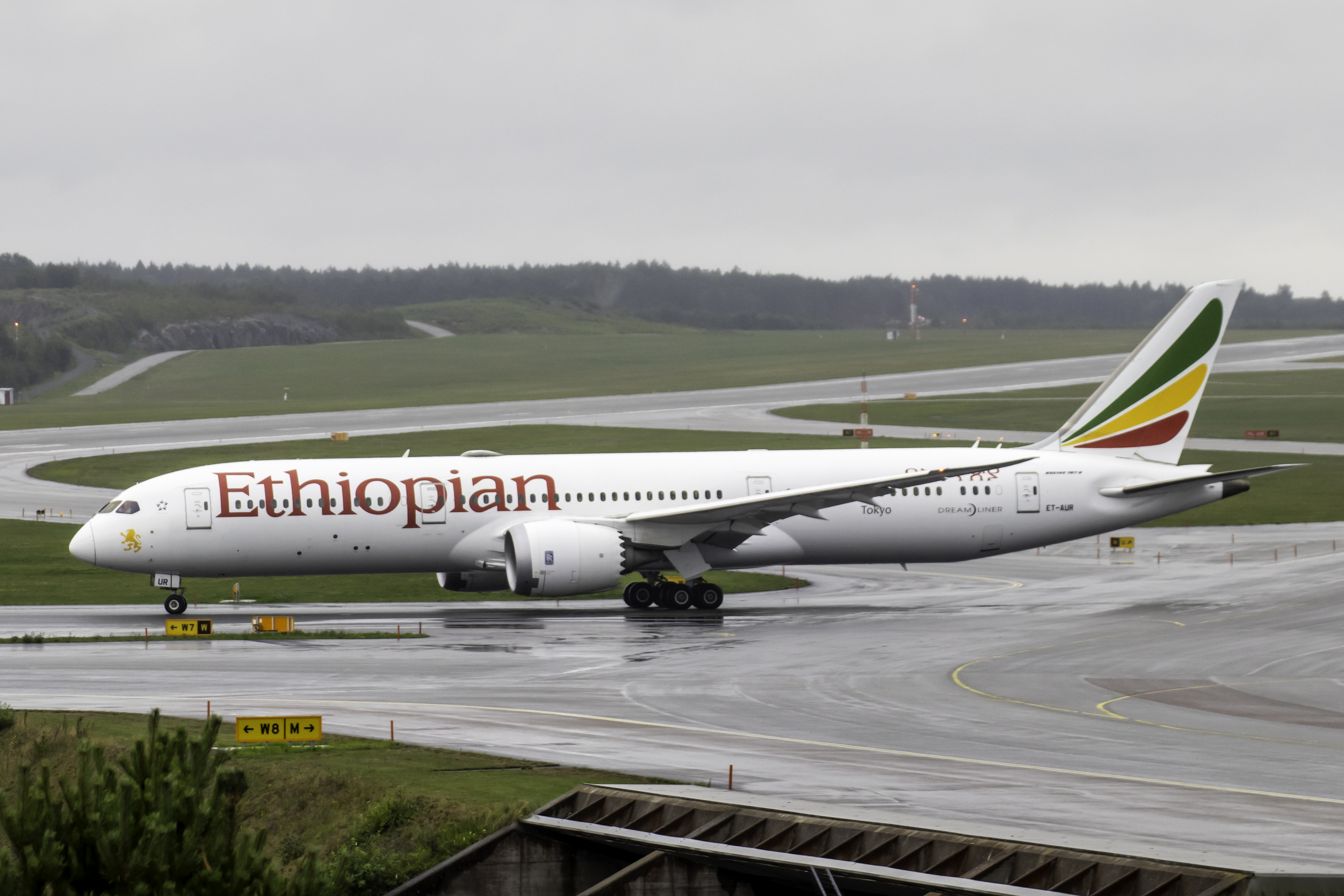
Boeing 787-9

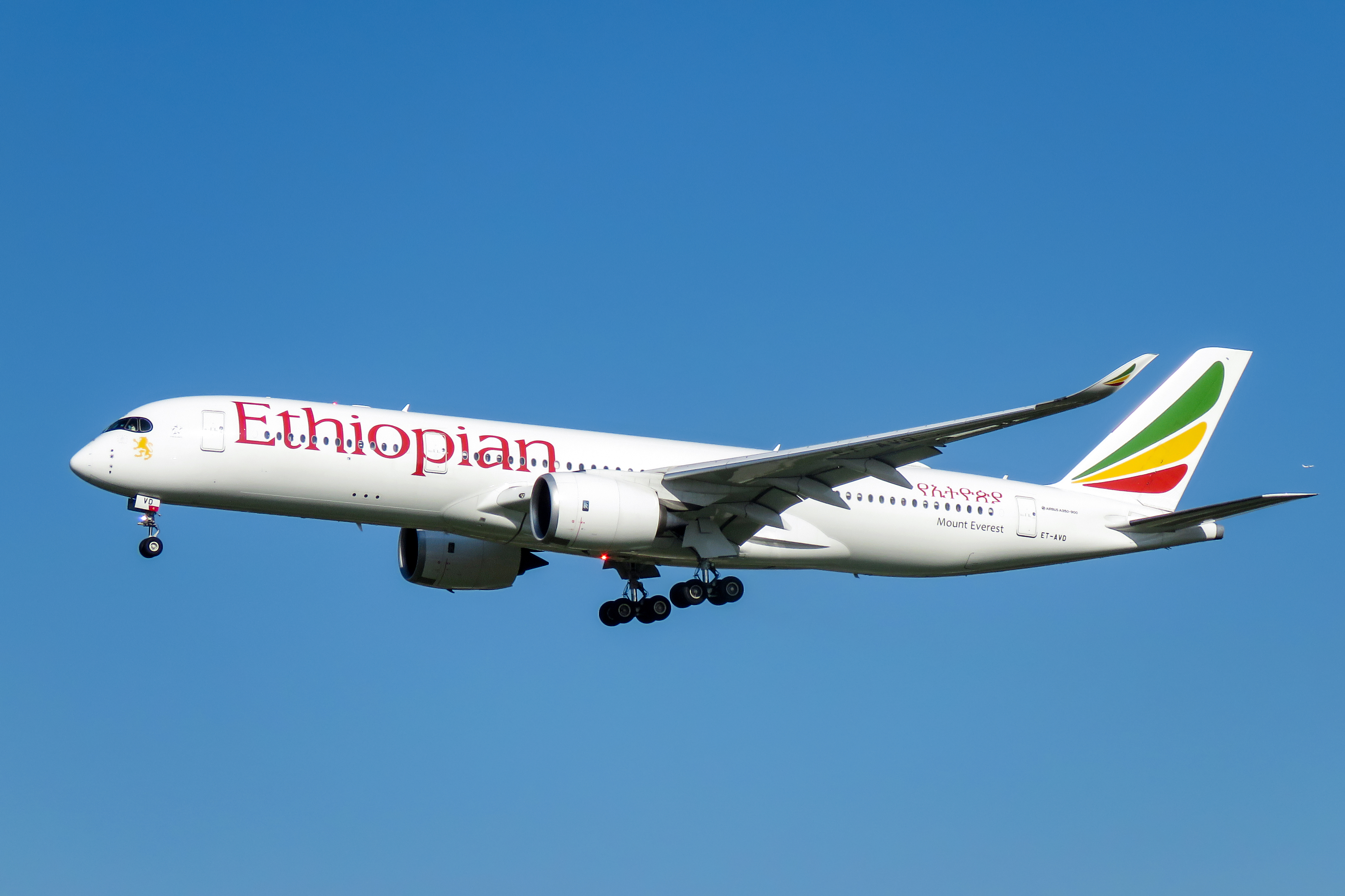
Airbus A350-900

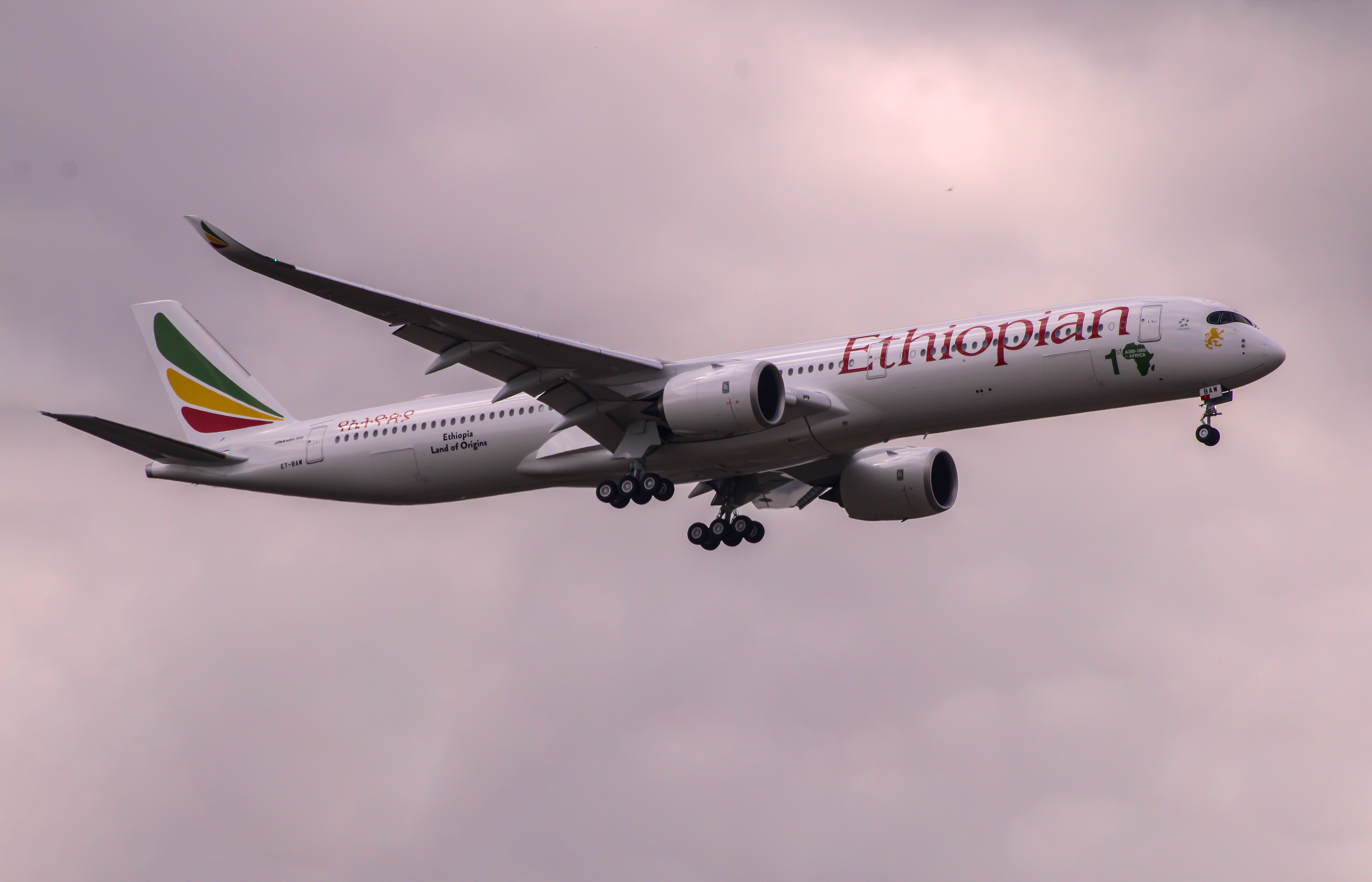
Airbus A350-1000

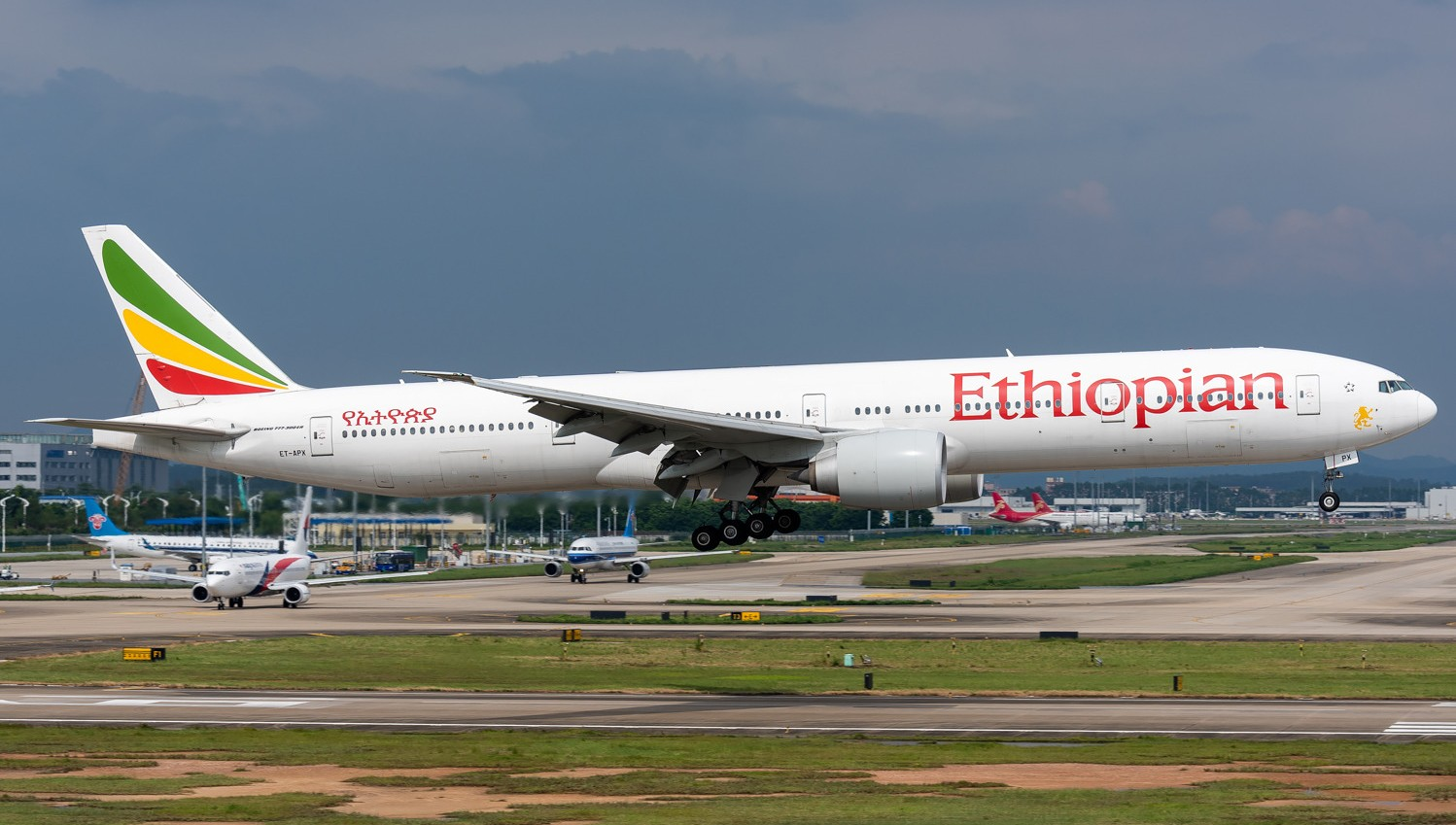
Boeing 777-300ER

As of November 2025, the Ethiopian Airlines fleet consists of the following aircraft:

Ethiopian Airlines fleet
Passenger fleet
Aircraft	In service	Orders	Passengers			Notes
Aircraft	In service	Orders	B	E	Total	Notes
Airbus A350-900	22	17	30	318	348	Two aircraft were taken from a Sichuan Airlines order. Additional order 6 in November 2025.
Airbus A350-1000	4	—	46	349	395	First operator in Africa.
Boeing 737-700	4	—	16	102	118	
Boeing 737-800	19	—	16	138	154	
Boeing 737-800	19	—	12	156	168	
Boeing 737 MAX 8	28	45	16	144	160	Additional order of 11 in November 2025.
Boeing 777-200LR	6	—	34	287	321	
Boeing 777-300ER	5	—	28	365	393	
Boeing 777-9	—	8	TBA	383	TBA	With an option for 12 more frames.
Boeing 787-8 Dreamliner	20	—	24	246	270	
Boeing 787-9 Dreamliner	10	26	30	285	315	Additional order of 6 converted from options in April 2026.
De Havilland Canada Dash 8-400	30	—	7	64	71	
De Havilland Canada Dash 8-400	30	—	—	78	78	
Cargo fleet
Boeing 737-800SF	4	—	Cargo			
Boeing 767-300BDSF	4	—	Cargo			Converted from passenger aircraft.
Boeing 777F	12	2	Cargo			Deliveries from 2027.
Boeing 777-300ERSF	—	2	Cargo			Deliveries from 2028.
Boeing 777-8F	—	8	Cargo			Order with 8 options. Deliveries from 2027.
Total	168	108				

Aside from the equipment shown above, the airline uses a number of DA40NGs for training purposes. Ethiopian Airlines had the largest dedicated cargo fleet in Africa, as of December 2013.

== Recent developments ==
In February 2005, Ethiopian Airlines signed a preliminary agreement to buy up to ten Boeing 787 Dreamliners (five firm orders plus five options), becoming the first African carrier to order 787s. On 31 May 2005, Boeing announced that Ethiopian had exercised its purchase rights and confirmed a firm order for ten aircraft. The carrier was the first African airline to order and to operate the Boeing 777-200LR and took possession of its first aircraft of the type, which was the 900th delivered 777 model, in November 2010.

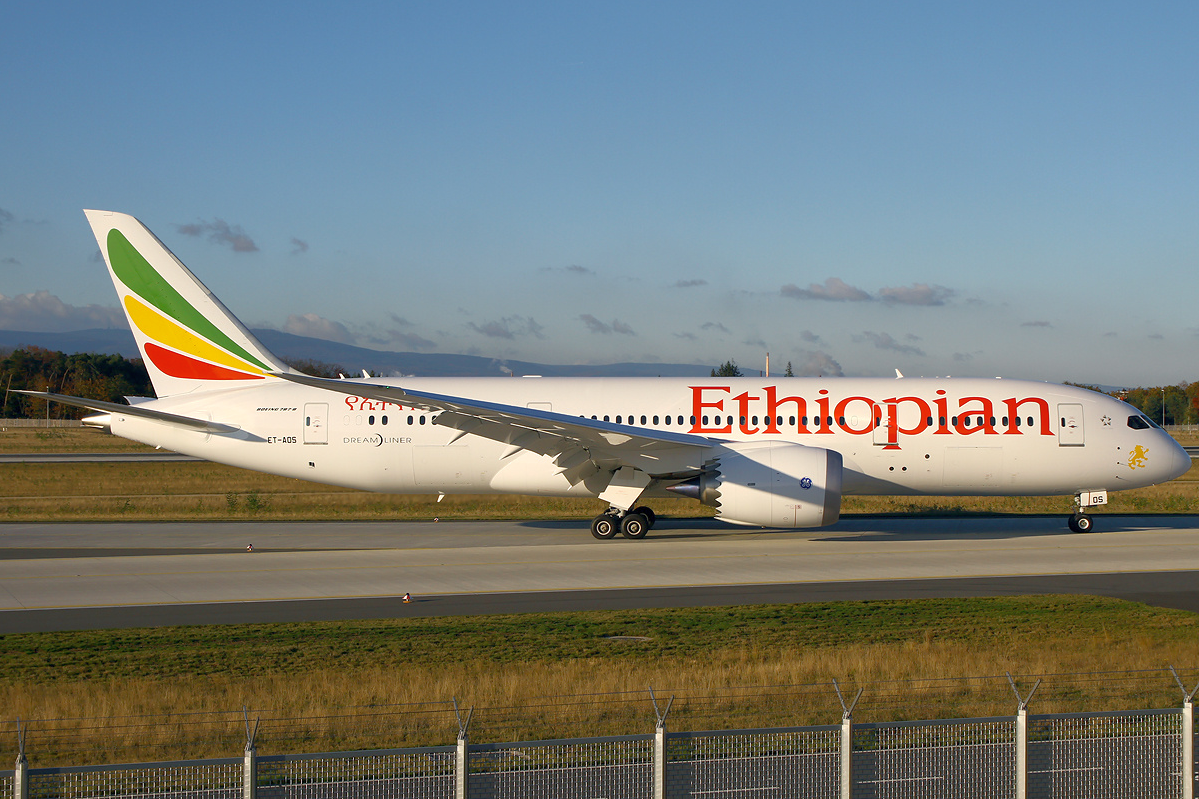
An Ethiopian Airlines Boeing 787 Dreamliner at Frankfurt Airport. The airline took delivery of the first aircraft of the type in August 2012.

The company ordered eight Bombardier Q400s for US$242 million in November 2008 and took options on four more. During the 2009 Dubai Air Show, Ethiopian placed an order for 12 Airbus A350-900s, initially scheduled for delivery between 2016 and 2019. At November 2011, this order was the largest placed by the airline, and it evidenced the company's dissatisfaction with Boeing for the delays in the delivery of the Dreamliners, initially scheduled to enter the fleet in June 2010. In January 2010, Ethiopian Airlines announced a firm order for ten Boeing 737-800 Next Generation aircraft in a deal worth US$767 million. The first 78-seater Q400 was acquired in March; in August, Ethiopian and the Ex-Im Bank signed an agreement worth US$1.6 billion for a loan to finance the acquisition of the ten Dreamliners (the first scheduled for delivery in mid-August 2012) and the five Boeing 777s already in the fleet.

In October 2011, the company announced an order for four Boeing 777Fs in a deal worth US$1.1 billion; Ethiopian Airlines is the first African carrier to order the aircraft. These four will join two others the airline will lease from GECAS. The first was received in mid September 2012.

Five Q400 NextGens were ordered in February 2012 for US$160 million at list prices. In July 2012, an additional Boeing 777-200LR was ordered in a deal worth US$276 million; the airline took possession of this aircraft in early July 2013. In August 2012, the first Dreamliner was delivered to the airline, which became the third airline to operate the type on scheduled flights, preceded only by All Nippon Airways and Japan Airlines. Also in October 2012, the first Q400 NexGen was delivered, and in November the same year, the airline confirmed that three additional Dreamliners would be leased from ILFC, the first of them entering service in 2015. In April 2013, Air Lease Corporation and Ethiopian Airlines announced the lease of two Boeing 777-300ERs, with deliveries in May and June 2015. In early July the same year, Ex-Im Bank approved around US$130 million for Boeing to support the development of GE90-equipped long-haul aircraft for Ethiopian Airlines. The airline took delivery of its first Boeing 777-300ER in November 2013. That month, during the Dubai Air Show, Palma Holding signed a letter of intent with Bombardier for eight Q400s to be leased to Ethiopian; the order was firmed up in February 2014. In September 2014 the carrier announced a firm order for 20 Boeing 737 MAX 8s and commitments for 15 more. In January 2015, Ethiopian Airlines had the most numerous fleet in Africa. In 2015 the airline planned to buy 15 to 20 of Boeing's new 777X planes worth about $7.4 billion at list prices. Although the airline had initially planned to buy Airbus' A350-1000 jets, it switched to the 777X as it is more suitable for operations at their high-altitude hub in Addis Ababa. It was the first airline in Africa to acquire a Boeing 787 full-flight simulator.

The airline received its first Airbus A350 XWB in June 2016. At the 2017 Paris Airshow, Ethiopian announced an additional firm order for 10 Airbus A350-900s, and committed to purchasing two Boeing 777 Freighter aircraft. The airline also exercised its options for 10 Boeing 737 MAX 8s they had from their original order in 2014, extending the largest 737 MAX order by an African carrier. In October 2017, the airline took delivery of its first Boeing 787-9 Dreamliner, making it the first airline in Africa to take delivery and operate the type. During the 2017 Dubai Airshow, Ethiopian Airlines placed a firm order for four Boeing 777 Freighters, valued at more than $1.3 billion at list prices; these aircraft will be powered with GE90-115B engines.

In January 2018, Ethiopian Airlines' Cargo and Logistics Services signed an agreement with aircraft lessor GECAS to lease two Boeing 737-800SF freighters. With deliveries set for June 2018 and January 2019 respectively, these passenger aircraft will be converted into freighter aircraft by Miami, Florida-based Aeronautical Engineers Inc. (AEI). Later that year, Ethiopian Airlines placed a repeat order for the Bombardier Q400 turboprop aircraft. This additional purchase includes a firm order for 10 Q400s in a deal worth US$332 million plus purchase rights for five additional aircraft of the type. In June, Ethiopian Airlines took delivery of its 100th aircraft, a Boeing 787-9; making history as the first airline in Africa to operate a total of 100 aeroplanes in its fleet as part of its fleet expansion and modernisation. The airline took delivery of its first Boeing 737 MAX 8 in July 2018.

In May 2019, Ethiopian Airlines reached an agreement with the government of Ghana, foreshadowing the setup of a new national airline in Accra to rejuvenate its aviation sector. According to The Reporter, the coming airline is supposed to be home-based, and Ghana, as well as its private sector, will have a minimum of 51 percent stake in the development.

In March 2022, Ethiopian Airlines signed an MoU for five Boeing 777-8 freighters to complement its existing Boeing 777F fleet, becoming the second airline to order the next generation freighter jet. In July 2022, Ethiopian Airlines upsized four of its original Airbus A350-900 orders to the larger A350-1000.

== Historical fleet ==
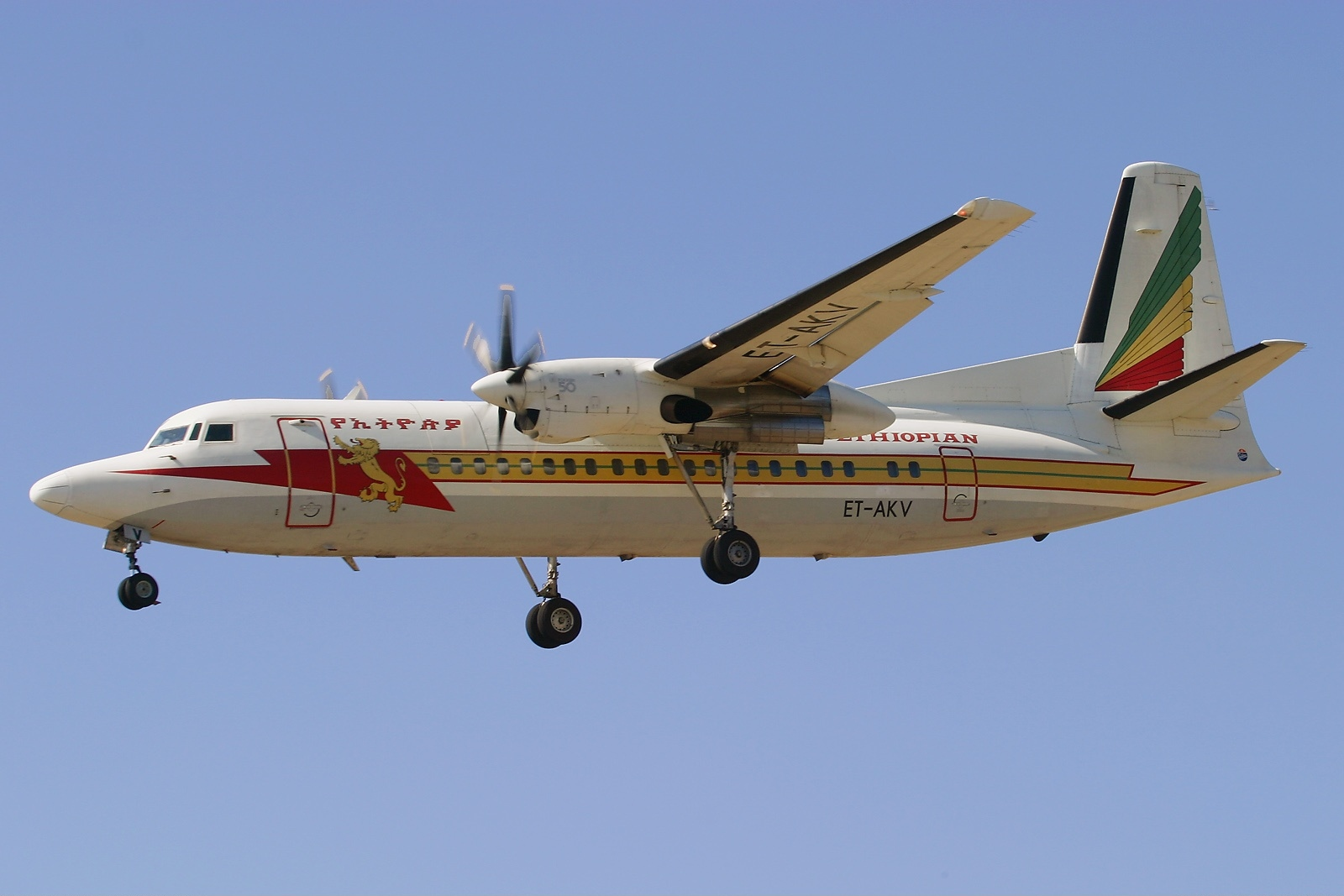
Ethiopian Airlines Fokker 50 in 2005

Following is a list of equipment previously operated by Ethiopian. Helicopters and light aircraft were available for leasing to Government agencies as well as to be used on natural resources projects.

- Airbus A330-200
- Airbus A340-300
- Antonov An-12BP
- ATR 42-300
- Beechcraft Model 18
- Bell 47
- Boeing 707-320C
- Boeing 720B
- Boeing 727-200
- Boeing 737-200
- Boeing 737-400F
- Boeing 747-200F
- Boeing 747-300
- Boeing 757-200
- Boeing 767-200ER
- Cessna 180
- Convair CV-240
- Douglas C-47
- Douglas C-47A
- Douglas C-47B
- Douglas C-53
- Douglas DC-3D
- Douglas DC-6A
- Douglas DC-6B
- De Havilland Canada DHC-5A Buffalo
- De Havilland Canada DHC-6
- De Havilland Canada DHC-7-100
- Fokker 50
- Lockheed L-100-30
- Lockheed L-749 Constellation
- McDonnell Douglas MD-11
- Piper PA-18 Super Cub
