= Scott Adelson =

American businessman (born 1961)

- Born: 1960 (age 65–66); Los Angeles, California
- Education: University of Southern California; University of Chicago Booth School of Business
- Occupation: Business executive
- Years active: 1987–present
- Spouse: Ashley Adelson
- Website: scottadelson.com

Scott Adelson (born 1960) is an American business executive who has served as the chief executive officer (CEO) of Houlihan Lokey since June 2024. Prior to this role, he served as co-president and global co-head of corporate finance.

== Early life and education ==
Scott Adelson was born in 1960 in Los Angeles, California. He earned a Bachelor of Science in business and entrepreneurship from the University of Southern California in 1984 and an MBA in finance from the University of Chicago Booth School of Business in 1987.

== Career ==
Adelson joined Houlihan Lokey in 1987. He became a senior associate within three years and a year later appointed as a vice president in the corporate finance division. In 1993, he was given the role of senior vice president and in 1995 managing director. In 2000, he became the global co-head of corporate finance.

In 2006, Adelson was named senior managing director and joined the board of directors. He became co-president and global co-head of corporate finance in 2013. During his tenure as co-president and global co-head of corporate finance, Adelson contributed to Houlihan Lokey's growth, including its expansion into international markets. Under his co-leadership, the firm pursued acquisitions, notably the 2021 acquisition of GCA Corp., which expanded Houlihan Lokey’s presence in Asia and Europe.

In June 2024, Adelson was appointed as the CEO of Houlihan Lokey, succeeding Scott Beiser.

In June 2025, Adelson was included in the LA500 2025 list.

== Personal life ==
Scott Adelson is married to Ashley Adelson; the couple met in 2012 and married in 2019. In 2020, they moved from Los Angeles to Montecito, California, where they reside on a historic property and share interests in wine and gardening. Adelson co-owns Antica Terra, a winery located in Oregon's Willamette Valley known primarily for Pinot Noir, which he and two colleagues acquired in the mid-2000s.

Adelson's charitable activities are influenced in part by his family background. His mother, Renee Adelson Kass, previously worked as an early childhood educator, and together they have supported causes related to education and poverty alleviation.

In 2016, Adelson founded the Adelson Foundation in collaboration with an initiative known as 7Sherpas. One notable project was a collaboration with the University of Chicago's Poverty Lab, where Adelson’s philanthropy funded research on homelessness and early childhood interventions in Chicago public schools.
