= Air Lease =

Air Lease may refer to:

- Air Lease Corporation, a major international aircraft leasing company headquartered in Los Angeles
- Aircraft lease, leases used by airlines and other aircraft operators
- Commercial Aircraft Sales and Leasing
