= Malaysia Airlines fleet =

List of Malaysia Airlines aircraft

Malaysia Airlines is the national carrier of Malaysia, and its fleet consists of 88 aircraft, which consists of 32 wide-bodies and 56 narrow bodies. The fleet consists of Airbus A330, Airbus A330neo, and A350 wide-bodies, as well as Boeing 737NG and newer-generation 737 MAX narrow-bodies.

== Current fleet ==
As of June 2025, Malaysia Airlines operates the following aircraft:

Malaysia Airlines fleet
| Aircraft | In service | Orders | Passengers | | | | | | Notes |
| Aircraft | In service | Orders | S | B | E+ | E | Total | Refs | Notes |
|---|---|---|---|---|---|---|---|---|---|
| Airbus A330-200 | 3 | — | — | 19 | 42 | 226 | 287 | | To be retired and replaced by Airbus A330-900 in 2030. |
| Airbus A330-300 | 13 | — | — | 27 | 16 | 247 | 290 | | To be retired and replaced by Airbus A330-900 in 2030. |
| Airbus A330-900 | 11 | 29 | — | 28 | 24 | 245 | 297 | | Leased from Avolon with deliveries from November 2024 until 2028. Replacing Airbus A330ceo. Optional order of 20 firmed with Airbus with deliveries to commence from 2029 to 2031. |
| Airbus A350-900 | 7 | — | 4 | 35 | 27 | 220 | 286 | | To have Business Suites removed and replaced with new Business Class cabins. One aircraft acquired from Scandinavian Airlines to be retrofitted with the new Business Class cabin and unified after 2025. |
| Airbus A350-900 | 7 | — | — | 40 | 32 | 228 | 300 | | To have Business Suites removed and replaced with new Business Class cabins. One aircraft acquired from Scandinavian Airlines to be retrofitted with the new Business Class cabin and unified after 2025. |
| Boeing 737-800 | 38 | — | — | 16 | — | 144 | 160 | | To be refurbished with new Business Class and Economy Class cabins. |
| Boeing 737-800 | 38 | — | — | 12 | — | 162 | 174 | | To be retired and replaced by Boeing 737 MAX in 2028. |
| Boeing 737 MAX 8 | 19 | 24 | — | 12 | — | 162 | 174 | | First 25 MAX 8 aircraft leased from ALC with deliveries from November 2023 until 2026. Next 18 MAX 8 and new 12 MAX 10 aircraft ordered directly from Boeing with 30 options across both variants. Replacing Boeing 737-800 by 2030. |
| Boeing 737 MAX 10 | — | 12 | TBA | | | | | | First 25 MAX 8 aircraft leased from ALC with deliveries from November 2023 until 2026. Next 18 MAX 8 and new 12 MAX 10 aircraft ordered directly from Boeing with 30 options across both variants. Replacing Boeing 737-800 by 2030. |
| Total | 91 | 65 | | | | | | | |

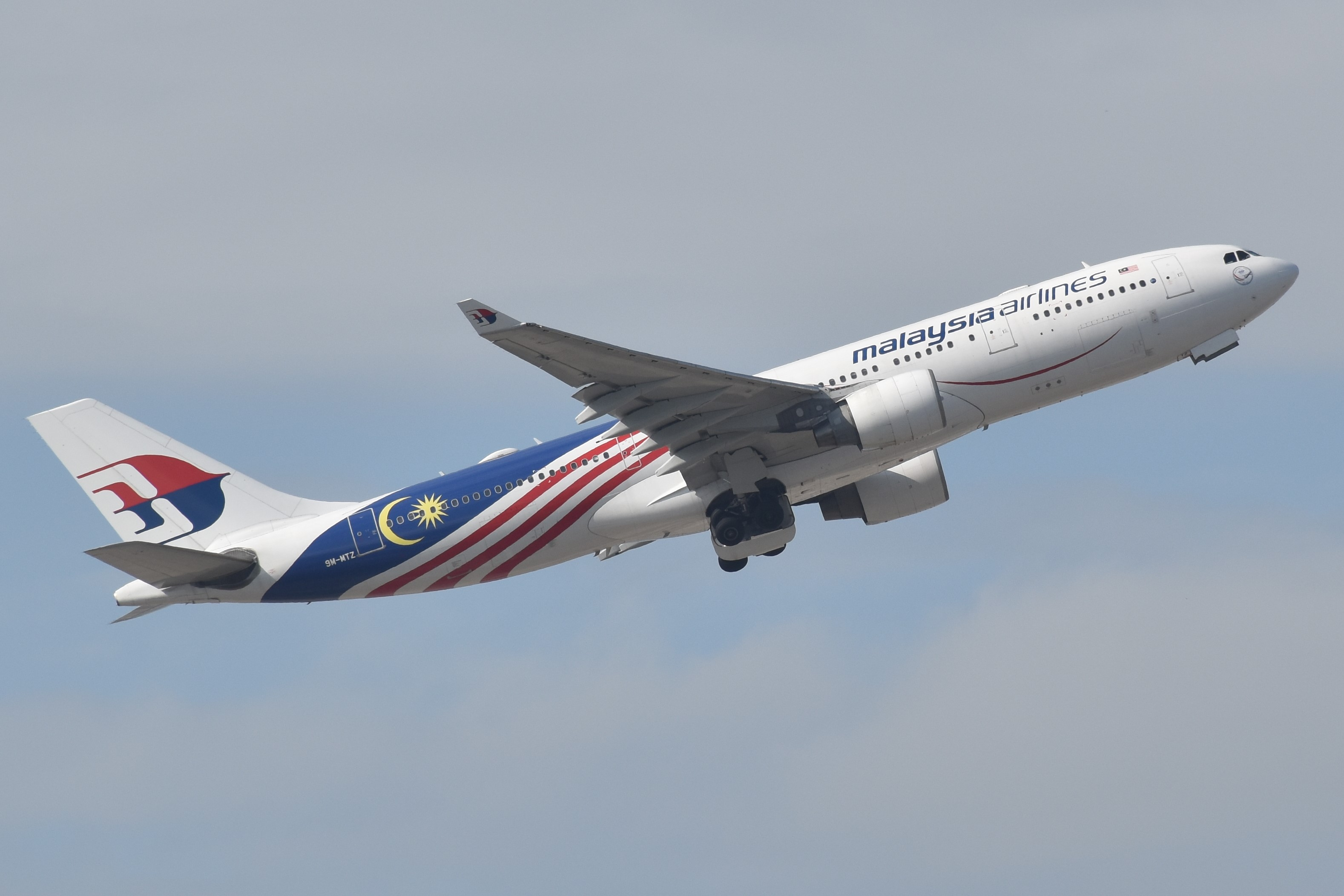
Airbus A330-200

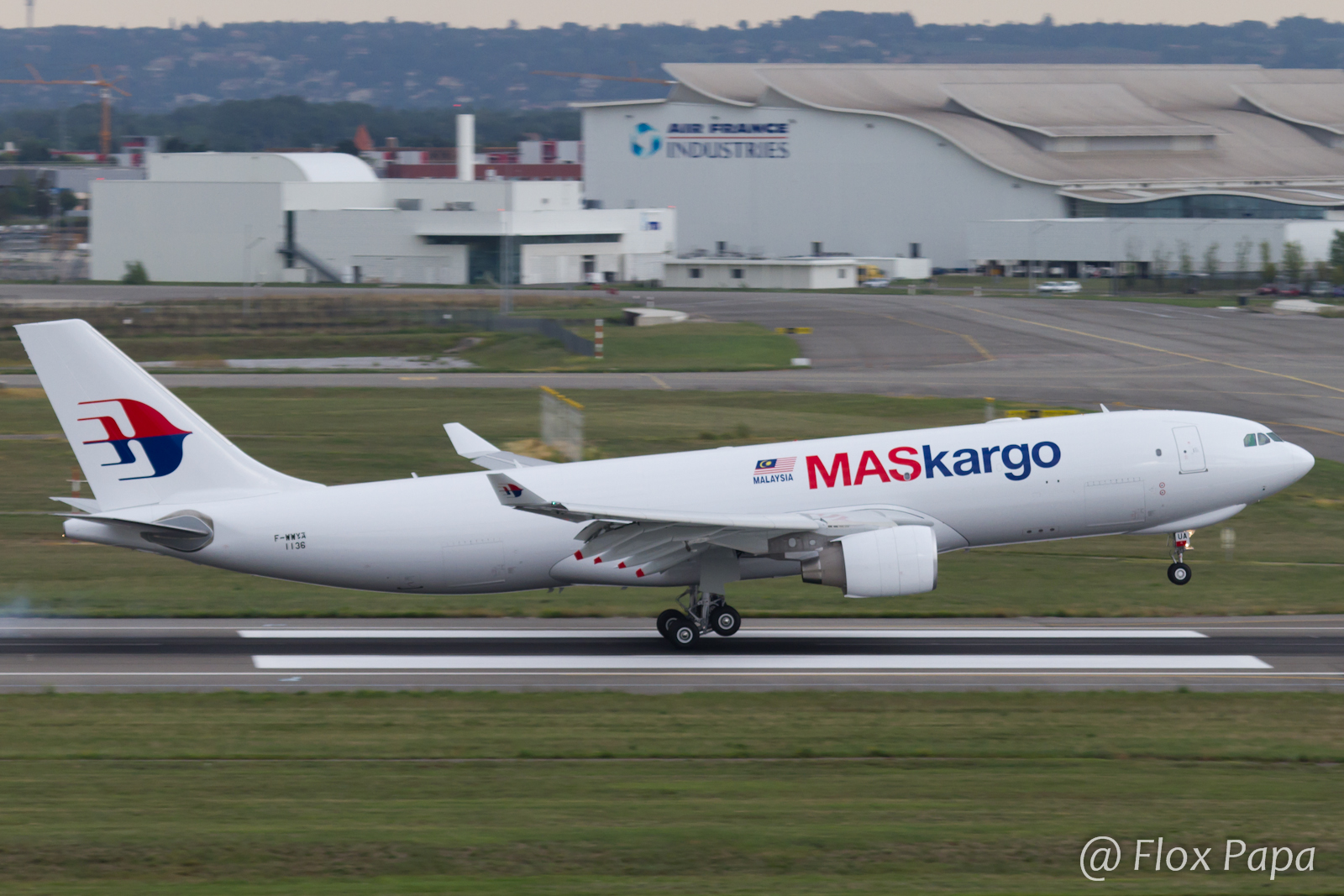
Airbus A330-200F

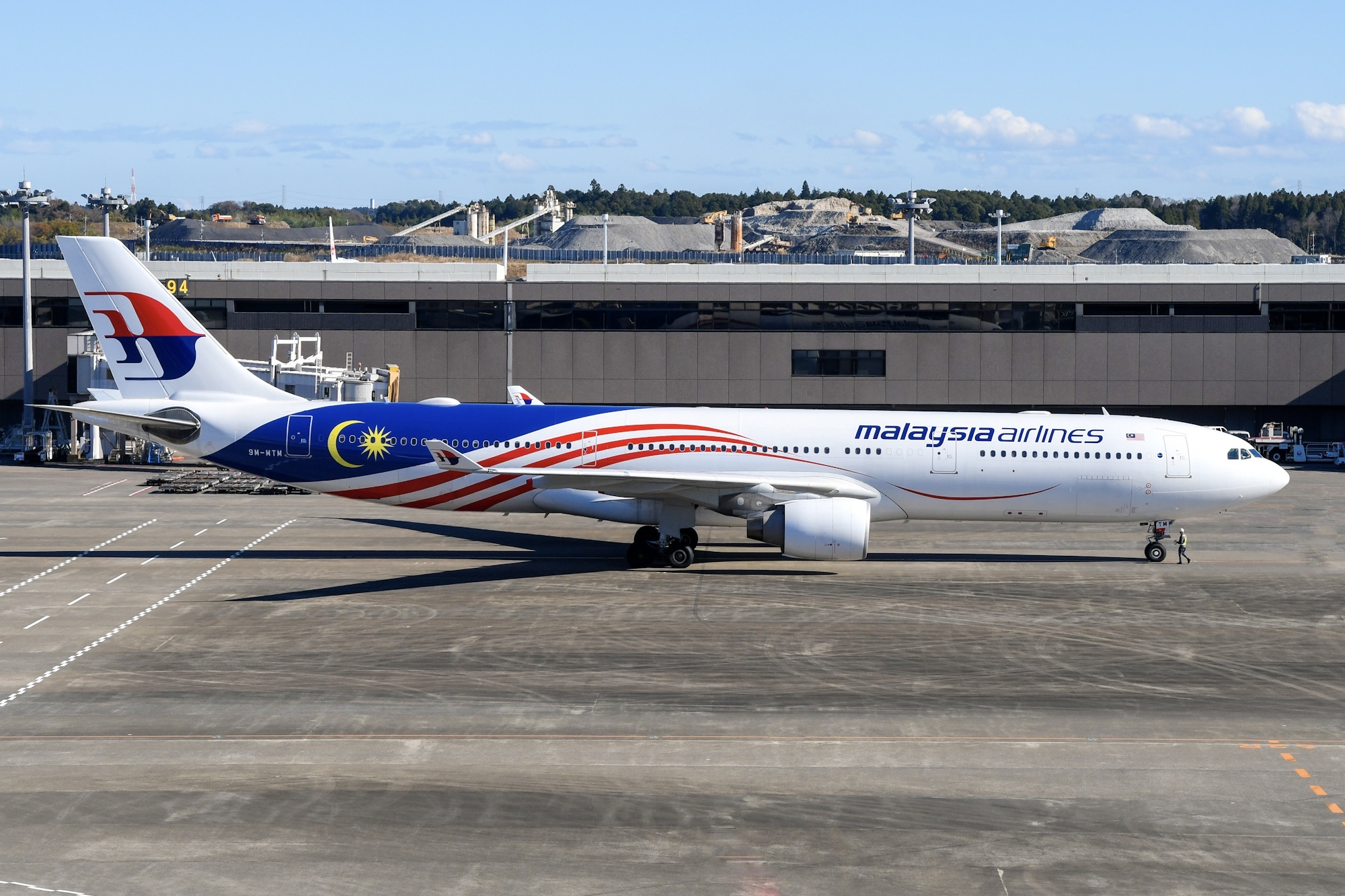
Airbus A330-300

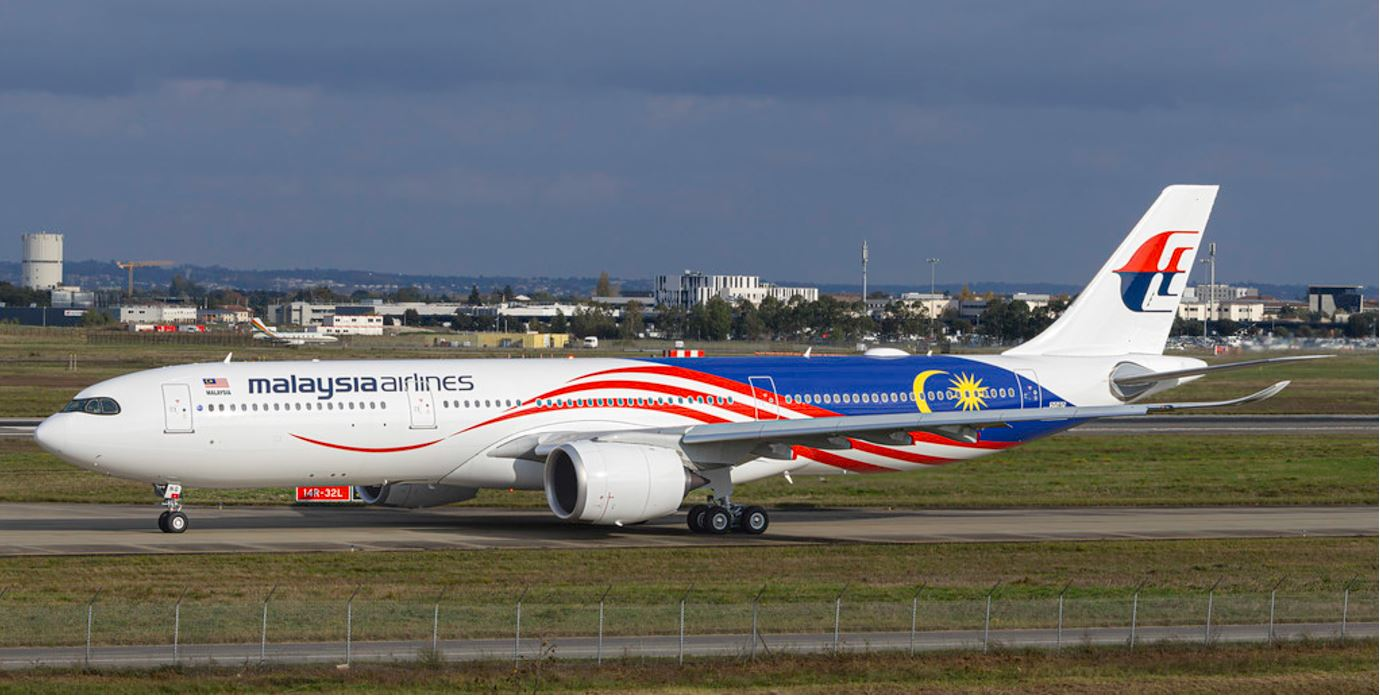
Airbus A330-900

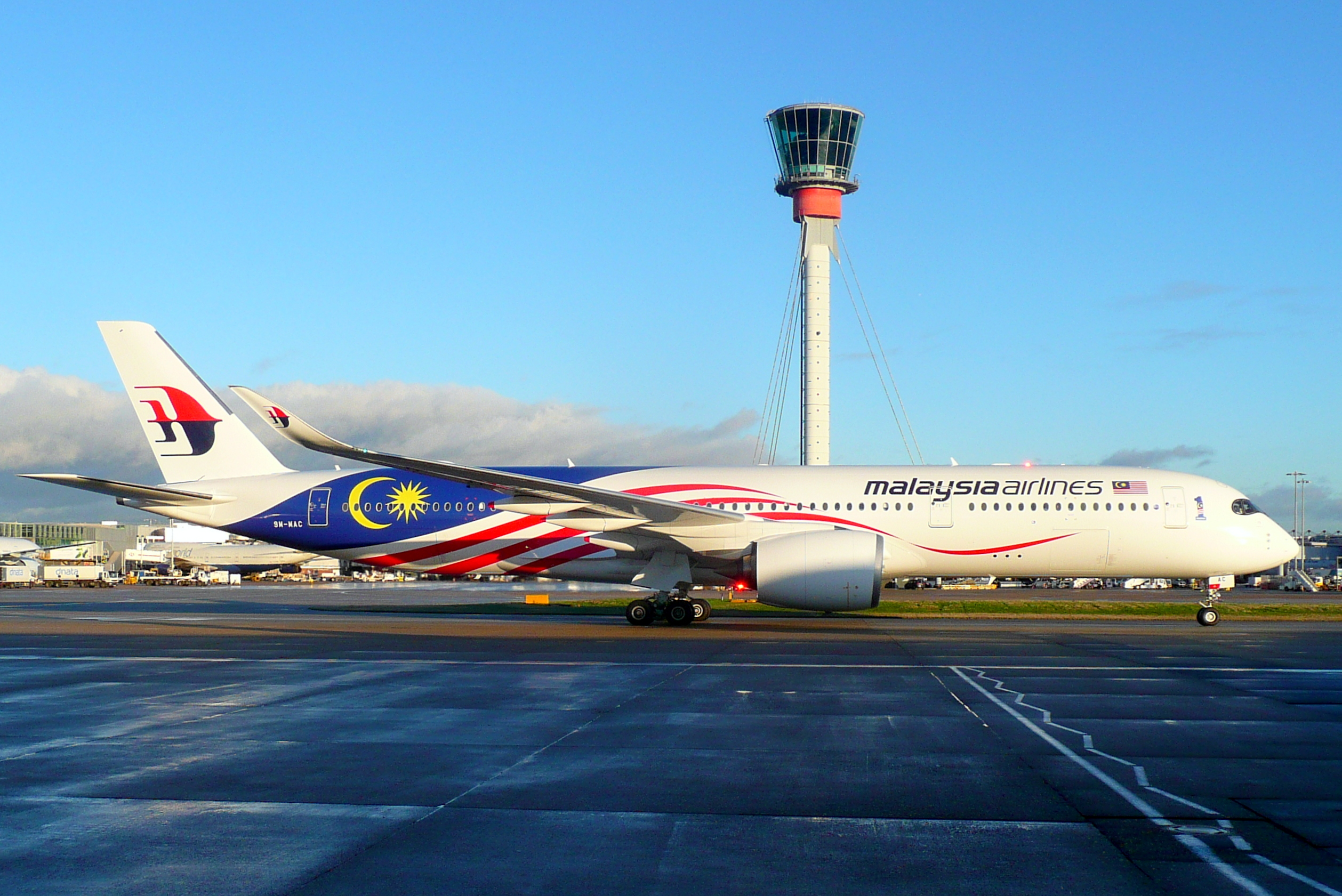
Airbus A350-900

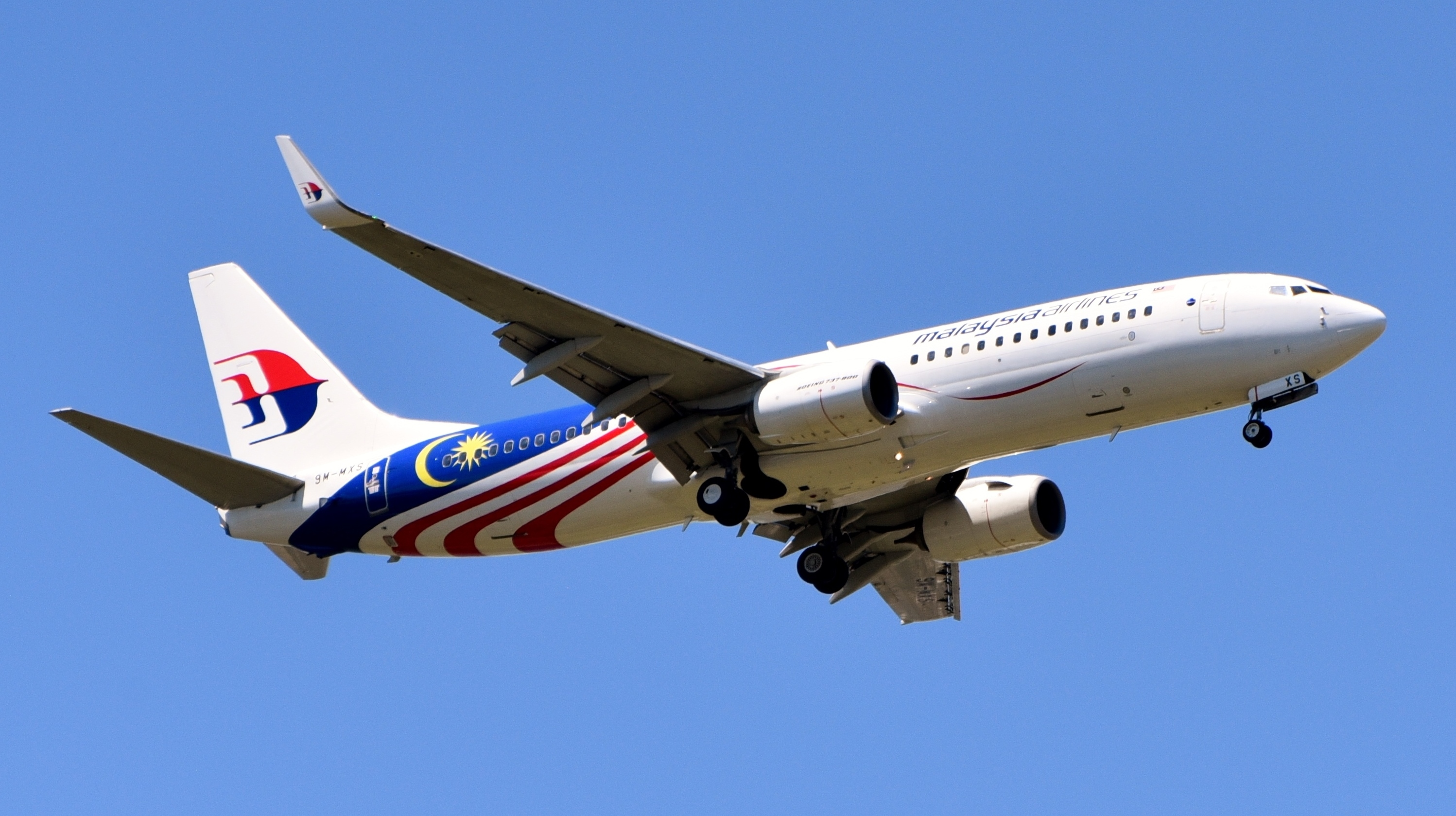
Boeing 737-800

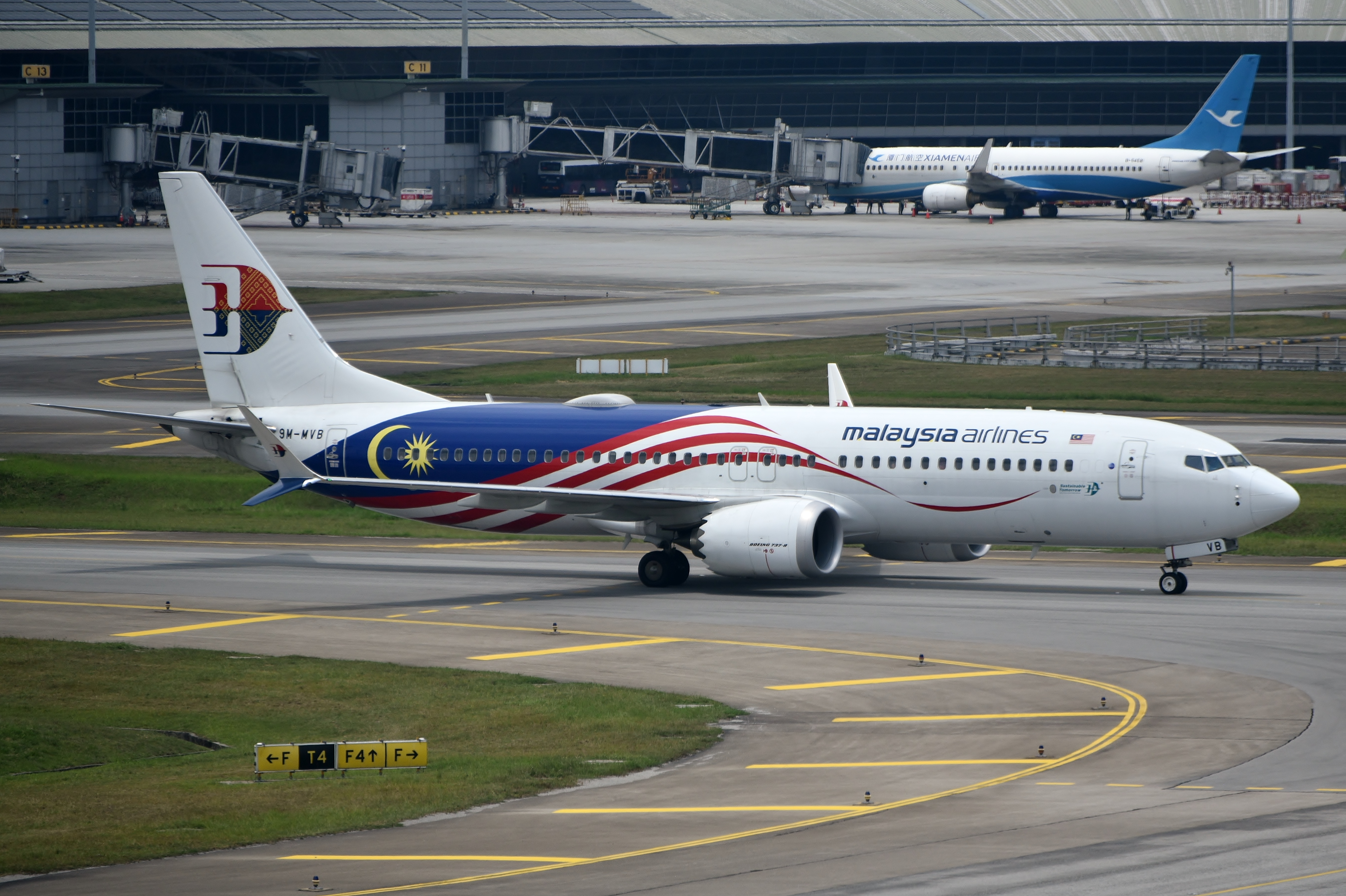
Boeing 737 MAX 8

== Current aircraft types ==
=== Airbus A330-200 ===
Malaysia Airlines leased six Airbus A330-200s in 2017. Due to insufficient wide-body aircraft and increasing demand, these aircraft are used for several high-demand medium-haul routes. The aircraft are secondhand and have kept the configuration of their previous operator (Air Berlin), this being 19 Business Class seats and 268 Economy Class seats. The airline previously operated five 'older generation' A330-200s between 2003 and 2013. The aircraft are set to be retired and replaced by the Airbus A330-900.

=== Airbus A330-300 ===
Malaysia Airlines' Airbus A330-300 fleet is used to fly medium-to-long-haul routes. They are painted in the new livery and equipped with enhanced in-flight features as part of the airline's fleet renewal programme. In 2009, the airline ordered 15 Airbus A330-300 with 10 additional purchase options. The aircraft has an improved max take-off weight, range and fuel efficiency over the previous older generation aircraft that the airline operated since 1995. The first of these new A330s arrived in 2011 with a total of 15 delivered by the end of 2013. In 2016, the airline refurbished the Business Class cabin of the aircraft with lie-flat seats. The aircraft previously only featured recliner seats. The fleet is set to be retired and replaced by the Airbus A330-900.

=== Airbus A330-900 ===
In July 2022, Malaysia Airlines was reportedly in talks for a $10 billion order of 30 either Airbus A330neo or Boeing 787 Dreamliner planes. As of August 2022, it was reported that Malaysia Airlines is poised to announce a deal to acquire 20 Airbus A330neo wide-body jets. In August 2022, Malaysia Airlines confirmed it would take delivery of an initial order of 20 Airbus A330neo aircraft with purchase options for an additional 20 to gradually replace its aging A330-200 and A330-300 aircraft between Q3 2024 and 2028 for flights across Asia, the Pacific and the Middle East. The deliveries are set to be split between 10 direct purchases and 10 leases from Ireland's Avolon. On 21 March 2024, Malaysia Airlines revealed the cabin of the A330neo. The first A330neo was delivered on 29 November 2024.Recently, the airline has filed all of its purchasing rights for the aircraft model for a total of 40 frames. This puts the airline as being one of the largest A330neo operators.

=== Airbus A350-900 ===
Malaysia Airlines began taking delivery of six Airbus A350-900 aircraft leased from Air Lease Corporation in 2017 to replace the ageing Boeing 777-200ER fleet, and was the first A350-900 operator to offer First Class. They are configured to accommodate 4 seats in First Class, 35 seats in Business Class and 247 seats in Economy Class (286 seats in total) after MAB CEO, Peter Bellew, said premium economy seats "would erode our business product and revenues". On 12 December 2018, First Class was rebranded as Business Suite Class. In 2023, Malaysia Airlines is seeking an aircraft lessor to add 4 extra A350s into the fleet due to high demand and increasing capacity. The airline plans to reconfigure all of its A350s' Business Classes and remove Business Suites in late 2025, with the seating type to match with the upcoming A330neo.

=== Boeing 737-800 ===
The first order for the Boeing 737-800 was first announced at the Farnborough Air Show on 16 July 2008. On 29 October 2010, Malaysia Airlines launched the first 737-800s that was fitted with the new, passenger-inspired Boeing Sky Interior. Boeing 737-800s currently account for the majority of aircraft under Malaysia Airlines and are primarily assigned to flights to regional Southeast Asian and domestic destinations. As of 2022, the airline has begun transferring some of its Boeing 737-800 aircraft to its subsidiary Firefly.

=== Boeing 737 MAX ===
Malaysia Airlines originally ordered the Boeing 737 MAX 8 to replace its Boeing 737-800 fleet. An order of 50 frames was made in July 2016. In September 2016, the airline modified part of the order which consists of 25 Boeing 737 MAX aircraft in 2017 which now includes a memorandum of understanding signing of 8 Boeing 787-9 aircraft in 2017 with both aircraft families expected to enter service in 2021. The deal lapsed a year later as nothing firm was signed past the MOU deadline. The airline then opted switch back to its original deal which now includes the ability to convert some of its orders to the Boeing 737 MAX 10. In 2019, as a result of the ongoing Boeing 737 MAX groundings, the airline has opted to suspend its orders for the aircraft temporarily.

In 2022, Malaysia Airlines has reiterated that it has resumed its order for 25 Boeing 737 MAXs with 25 options with Boeing at a cost of slightly over US$2 billion. The deal retains the airlines' ability to convert some frames to Boeing 737 MAX 10. In November 2023, the airline has taken delivery of the first aircraft. The Boeing 737 MAX 8 would be the main workhorse for the airlines domestic and regional network for flights less than 5 hours.

Recently, the airline has confirmed its purchasing orders by firming its 25 optional slots and further firming an additional 5, bringing the total narrow-body fleet order to 55 aircraft. The orders consist of 18 more Boeing 737 MAX 8 and 12 more Boeing 737 MAX 10 aircraft.

== Fleet development plan ==
The airline has hinted that it plans to order an additional 45 new aircraft that would be delivered in 2028 onward based on its long term planning. The order consists of 35 narrow-body and 10 wide-body aircraft.

The first set of these orders have been confirmed to involve more Boeing 737 MAX narrow-body aircraft. 30 aircraft have been firmed with an option for 30 more.

As of July 2025, the airline has firmed 20 more A330neo from its purchasing options from Airbus. Next phase of orders are to replace its freighter aircraft for cargo division MASkargo and current A350 fleet.

== Former fleet ==
Malaysia Airlines and its predecessor companies have flown the following aircraft types in the past:

Malaysia Airlines historical fleet
| Aircraft | Total | Introduced | Retired | Replacement | Notes |
|---|---|---|---|---|---|
| Airbus A300-600F | 1 | 2008 | 2010 | Airbus A330-200F | Wet-leased from Air Atlanta Icelandic, and operated by MASkargo. |
| Airbus A330-200 | 2 | 2018 | Ongoing | Airbus A330neo | Returned to lessor. |
| Airbus A330-300 | 1 | 1995 | 2000 | None | Written-off due to chemical cargo incident. |
| Airbus A380-800 | 6 | 2012 | 2022 | Airbus A350-900 | All returned to Airbus in exchange for Airbus A330neo. |
| Boeing 777-200ER | 17 | 1997 | 2016 | Airbus A350-900 | |
