= Steven F. Udvar-Házy =

Hungarian-American aviation businessman (born 1946)

- Born: Ferenc István Udvarházy; 1946 (age 79–80); Budapest, Hungary
- Education: University High School; University of California, Los Angeles (BA)
- Occupations: Executive chairman, Air Lease Corporation
- Known for: Aircraft leasing
- Spouse: Christine Hazy
- Children: 4

Steven Ferencz Udvar-Házy ([ˈudvɒrhaːzi]; born 1946), also known as István or Steve Hazy, is a Hungarian-American billionaire businessman and the executive chairman of Air Lease Corporation. He is the former chairman and CEO of International Lease Finance Corporation (ILFC), one of the two largest aircraft lessors in the world (the other being AerCap). Forbes magazine's 2021 list of The World's Billionaires estimated his net worth at US$4 billion.

== Early life ==
Udvar-Házy was born in Budapest in 1946. His family moved to the US in 1958, when he was about 12 years old, fleeing the Soviet occupation of Hungary. Hazy attended University High School in Los Angeles, and the University of California, Los Angeles.

== Career ==
Udvar-Házy was in his 20s during the later part of the transition from propeller aircraft to jets during the mid to late 1960s, and realized that the higher capital investment required to purchase jet aircraft created an opportunity for a leasing business. He founded ILFC with fellow Hungarian Leslie Gonda and his son Louis Gonda in 1973, leasing a single used Douglas DC-8 to Aeroméxico. He left ILFC in February 2010 and founded Air Lease Corporation.

In 2016, Prime Minister of Hungary Viktor Orbán presented Udvar-Házy the Grand Cross of the Order of Merit of Hungary for his achievements in the airline industry.

== Philanthropy ==
Udvar-Házy gave a US$66 million grant to the Smithsonian Institution that allowed the U.S. National Air and Space Museum to build the Steven F. Udvar-Hazy Center annex at Washington Dulles International Airport. The annex houses more than 120 aircraft and 140 space-exploration exhibits as of 2006, and also includes the Space Shuttle Discovery. Plans call for eventually installing over 300 aircraft.

In 2000, the Udvar-Házy family contributed funds to build the Christine and Steven F. Udvar-Hazy Library and Learning Center at Embry–Riddle Aeronautical University's Prescott Campus. The business building at Utah Tech University in St. George, Utah is named after his parents, Erno and Etel Udvar-Házy.

== Personal life ==
He is married with four children and lives in Westlake, Texas.

Steven F. Udvar-Házy's son, Steven C. Udvar-Házy, has become notable in his own right within aircraft leasing and fleet operations. By 2018, Steven C. was Senior Vice President, OEM Relations & Market Development at the leasing firm Aviation Capital Group. Airline Economics magazine ranked him in its "top 40 individuals under 40 years of age in the commercial aviation industry" for three years running (2016–2018). By 2026, he was Head of Fleet Strategy and Planning with Alaska Airlines.
