= Leslie Gonda =

Hungarian-American businessman (1919–2018)

- Born: László Goldschmied; August 20, 1919; Mezőtúr, Hungary
- Died: March 16, 2018 (aged 98); Beverly Hills, California, United States
- Occupation: businessman
- Known for: Co-founder of International Lease Finance Corporation
- Spouse: Susan Gonda
- Children: Louis Gonda

Leslie Gonda (August 20, 1919 – March 16, 2018) was a Hungarian-born American businessman, philanthropist, and Holocaust survivor. He was the co-founder (with his son Louis Gonda) of International Lease Finance Corporation.

== Early life ==
Gonda was born László Goldschmied to a Jewish family in the town of Mezőtúr, Hungary, on August 20, 1919. He changed his name to escape the Nazis during World War II. He earned a degree from the University of Magyarovar.

== Career ==
In 1945, Gonda moved to Venezuela, beginning a local wares business which expanded into real estate and construction. Over time, he expanded his interests, beginning local businesses and branching into hotels and the aircraft industry. In 1963, he moved to Los Angeles, United States and started International Lease Finance Corporation (ILFC) with his son Louis as well as his friend Steven Udvar-Hazy. ILFC later became the second largest airliner leasing company in the world and a pioneer of aircraft leasing. In 1983, they took ILFC public and in 1990, they sold it to American International Group for AIG stock. Gonda was given a seat on AIG's Board of Directors. In 1995, Gonda retired from AIG, and continued his activities in commercial real estate and venture capital investments via his Lexington Commercial Holdings. Gonda's wealth plummeted after the collapse of AIG during the 2009 economic crisis.

== Philanthropy ==
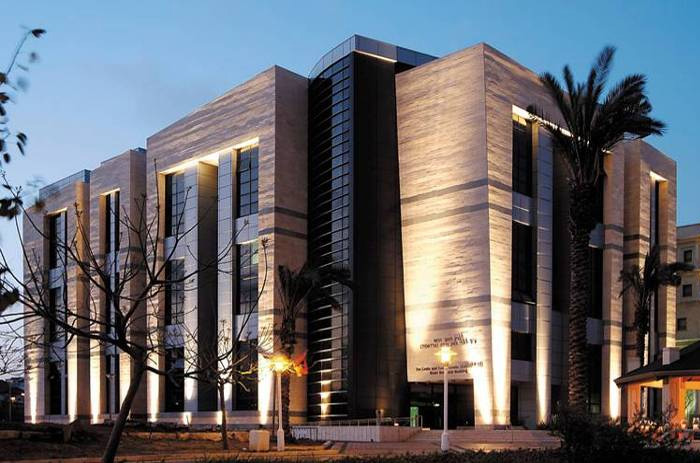
The Leslie and Susan Gonda (Goldschmied) Multidisciplinary Brain Research Center at Bar-Ilan University building (2011)

Gonda was a benefactor of many medical institutions, museums, and charities. He donated the learning center at the Holocaust Museum in Washington, D.C. He made large donations to the Mayo Clinic in Rochester, Minnesota, where the Gonda building is named after him. He made large donations to the UCLA Medical Center where the Gonda (Goldschmied) Neuroscience and Genetics Research Center and the Gonda Diabetes Center are also named after him. He donated to the City of Hope Cancer Center and is known for his generosity in giving gold coins to his employees' children. In 1999, he gave $60 million to the Smithsonian Institution. He made large donations to Bar-Ilan University in Israel, for building "The Leslie and Susan Gonda (Goldschmied) Multidisciplinary Brain Research Center" and the "Leslie and Susan Gonda (Goldschmied) Nanotechnology Triplex".

== Personal life ==
He was married to Susan Gonda, also a Holocaust survivor, until her death in 2009. They had three children, and he lived in Beverly Hills, California.

Their son Louis Gonda is married to Broadway producer Kelly Gonda, daughter of actress Honey Sanders.

He died on March 16, 2018, aged 98.
