= Houlihan Lokey =

American investment bank and financial services company

Houlihan Lokey, Inc.

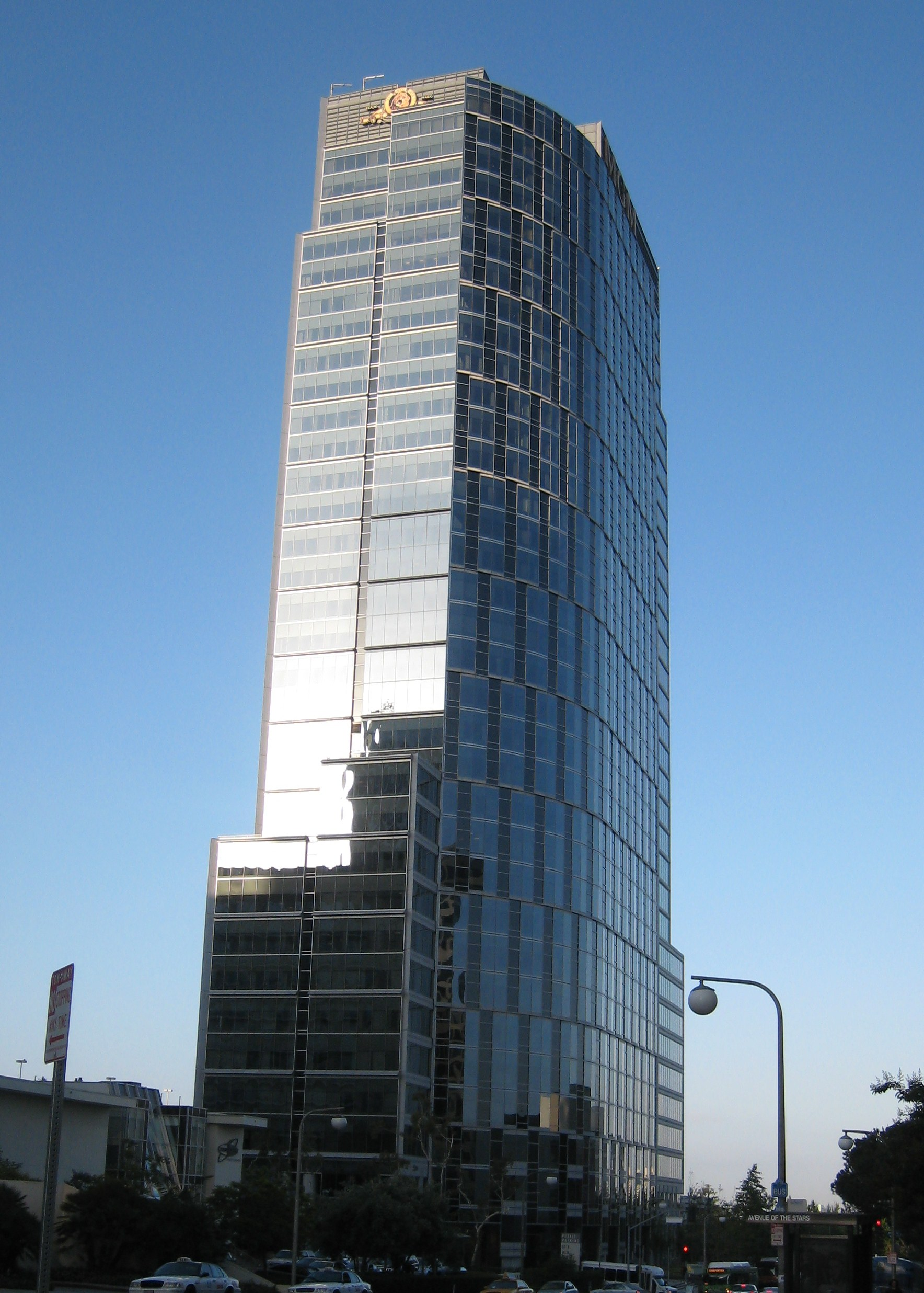
- Headquarters at Constellation Place
- Type: Public
- Traded as: NYSE: HLI (Class A); S&P 400 component
- Industry: Investment banking
- Founded: 1972; 54 years ago
- Headquarters: Constellation Place; Los Angeles, California, United States
- Key people: Irwin Gold (co-chairman); Scott Beiser (co-chairman); Scott Adelson (CEO); David Preiser (vice chairman)
- Products: Financial services; Investment banking
- Revenue: ▲US$2.39 billion (2025)
- Operating income: ▲US$502 million (2025)
- Net income: ▲US$400 million (2025)
- Total assets: ▲US$3.82 billion (2025)
- Total equity: ▲US$2.17 billion (2025)
- Number of employees: 2,702 (2025)
- Website: hl.com
- Footnotes; Financials as of March 31, 2025.

Houlihan Lokey, Inc. (NYSE: HLI) is an American multinational independent investment bank and financial services company, and the No. 1 ranked global M&A advisor by transaction count. Houlihan Lokey was founded in 1972 and is headquartered at Constellation Place in Century City, Los Angeles, California.

The firm advises large public and closely held companies as well as institutions and governments. Its main service lines include mergers and acquisitions, capital solutions, restructuring and distressed M&A, fairness opinions, and financial and valuation advisory. As of February 2026, Houlihan Lokey employs more than 2,700 employees worldwide.

== History ==
=== 1970s ===
Houlihan Lokey, previously known as Houlihan Lokey Howard & Zukin, was co-founded in Los Angeles in 1972 by Richard Houlihan and O. Kit Lokey, both of whom left PricewaterhouseCoopers to start the company. Co-founders Robert "Bob" F. Howard joined the company in 1974, followed by James H. Zukin in 1976. The company started as a provider of general business advisory services to privately held companies.

The 1974 passage of the Employee Retirement Income Security Act launched the firm’s valuation business by creating demand for independent valuations of private businesses, particularly those that had formed employee stock ownership programs.

=== 1980s ===
In 1986, Kenneth Friedman founded and became President of Houlihan Lokey’s investment banking broker dealer to provide M&A advisory services and to raise debt and equity financing. Friedman formed the investment bank to provide Wall Street level expertise to the expanding investment banking demands of Houlihan Lokey’s clients and other middle market companies.

By 1987, many of the highly leveraged transactions completed earlier in the decade were starting to exhibit signs of financial distress. Accordingly, a market was developing for financial restructuring advisory services. To position itself to serve this market, the investment banking broker-dealer purchased Cheviot Capital Corporation in 1987 and, led by Jeff Werbalowsky and Irwin Gold, began assembling what would become an active, dominant, worldwide financial restructuring group.

With the surge of mergers, acquisitions, and leveraged buyouts, Wall Street’s large investment banking firms began calling on Houlihan Lokey for independent valuation expertise in fairness, solvency, and employee stock ownership plan (ESOP) opinions. The firm advised on transactions valued at more than $100 billion during this period. The firm also started to offer estate planning valuation services. In addition, the firm opened several offices in the 1980s in New York City, San Francisco, and Chicago.

=== 1990s ===
Houlihan Lokey opened eight offices across the U.S. in the 1980s and 1990s as it expanded. In 1995, to grow its information services division, Houlihan Lokey acquired Mergerstat, a publishing company with a 30-year history in analytical M&A research, from Merrill Lynch.

=== 2000s ===
In 2001, Houlihan Lokey launched its first non-U.S. office by expanding into London. It also expanded its industry group platform and private equity coverage program in keeping with investment banking trends. In 2002, Houlihan Lokey advised the official creditors committees in three large bankruptcies: WorldCom, Enron, and Conseco. In 2005, the firm opened a Paris office. In 2006, the firm opened a Frankfurt office. Also in 2006, Houlihan Lokey agreed to merge with Orix USA, the U.S. corporate lending operations of ORIX Corp. of Japan, to address the growing international demand for middle-market investment banking services.

In 2007, Houlihan Lokey expanded into Asia, opening offices in Hong Kong and Tokyo. Within the next three years, the firm also opened an office in Beijing. In 2008, Houlihan Lokey advised the creditors of Lehman Brothers.

=== 2010s ===
In 2010, Houlihan Lokey bought a sizable minority stake in Avista Advisory Group, giving the firm offices in both Mumbai and Singapore. In 2013, Houlihan Lokey expanded its Financial Institutions Group through the acquisition of Milestone Advisors. The firm also launched the Illiquid Financial Assets practice to advise on the sales of assets such as stakes in loan pools, life settlements, minority positions, pharmaceutical royalties, and operating leases. In 2014, Houlihan Lokey acquired ArchPoint Partners.

In 2015, Houlihan Lokey acquired management consulting firm Bridge Strategy Group, digital media and entertainment focused investment bank MESA Securities, London-based consumer-focused firm McQueen Ltd., and operations of the Continental European investment bank Leonardo & Co. Also in 2015, Houlihan Lokey acquired the investment banking operations of Leonardo & Co. NV in Germany, the Netherlands, and Spain, and became a minority partner in a joint venture with the management team of Leonardo in respect to Leonardo’s investment banking operations in Italy. This gave the firm offices in both Rome and Milan. On August 13, 2015, Houlihan Lokey completed its initial public offering, beginning trading as HLI on the NYSE.

In January 2017, Houlihan Lokey acquired Black Stone IP, a leader in Tech+IP advisory work. In January 2018, Houlihan Lokey acquired Quayle Munro Limited, an independent advisory firm focused on providing corporate finance advisory services to companies in the data & analytics sector. In May 2018, the firm acquired BearTooth Advisors, an independent advisory firm that provided strategic advisory and placement agency services to alternative investment managers.

In November 2019, Houlihan Lokey acquired Fidentiis Capital, growing Houlihan Lokey's Corporate Finance business in Europe. This was followed shortly after by the acquisition of Freeman & Co. in December 2019, an independent advisory firm providing a range of advisory services to financial institution clients.

=== 2020s ===
In August 2020, Houlihan Lokey acquired MVP Capital. In July 2021, Houlihan Lokey expanded its coverage of the consumer sector with the acquisition of boutique advisory firm Baylor Klein. Later, in October 2021, Houlihan Lokey acquired GCA Corporation, a top technology advisory firm, expanding the firm's presence in Asia and Europe. In February 2023, Houlihan Lokey acquired Oakley Advisory. In December 2023, Houlihan Lokey acquired 7 Mile Advisors, increasing the firm's IT services capabilities and expanding its Business Services Group.

In May 2024, Houlihan Lokey acquired Triago, expanding the firm's Capital Solutions Group and its private capital advisory and private placement capabilities. In October 2024, Houlihan Lokey acquired Prytania Solutions Ltd. (PSL). This acquisition strengthened Houlihan Lokey's Financial and Valuation Advisory business and expanded its presence in Europe. In December 2024, Houlihan Lokey acquired Waller Helms Advisors and Park Sutton Advisors.

In January 2026, Houlihan Lokey acquired Mellum Capital, a real estate advisory business with operations in Munich and London. In addition, Houlihan Lokey secured a controlling interest in Audere Partners, a French boutique firm operating under the Natixis Partners brand.

== Recognition ==
As of 2024, Houlihan Lokey is the top investment bank for global M&A transactions, the top M&A advisor for the past 10 years in the U.S., the top global restructuring advisor for the past 11 years, the top global M&A fairness opinion advisor over the past 25 years, and a Top 10 Most Active Global M&A Advisor as measured by LSEG and PitchBook.

== Office locations ==
- (Netherlands) Amsterdam
- (United States) Atlanta
- (United States) Baltimore
- (China) Beijing
- (United States) Boston
- (United States) Charlotte
- (United States) Chicago
- (United States) Dallas
- (United Arab Emirates) Dubai
- (Germany) Frankfurt
- (India) Gurugram
- Hong Kong
- (United States) Houston
- (United Kingdom) London
- (United States) Los Angeles
- (Spain) Madrid
- (United Kingdom) Manchester
- (United States) Miami
- (Italy) Milan
- (United States) Minneapolis
- (India) Mumbai
- (Germany) Munich
- (United States) New York City
- (France) Paris
- (United States) San Francisco
- (Brazil) São Paulo
- (China) Shanghai
- Singapore
- (Sweden) Stockholm
- (Australia) Sydney
- (Japan) Tokyo
- (United States) Washington, D.C.
- (Switzerland) Zurich

== See also ==
- List of investment banks
- Boutique investment bank
