= Constellation Place =

Skyscraper in Century City, Los Angeles, California

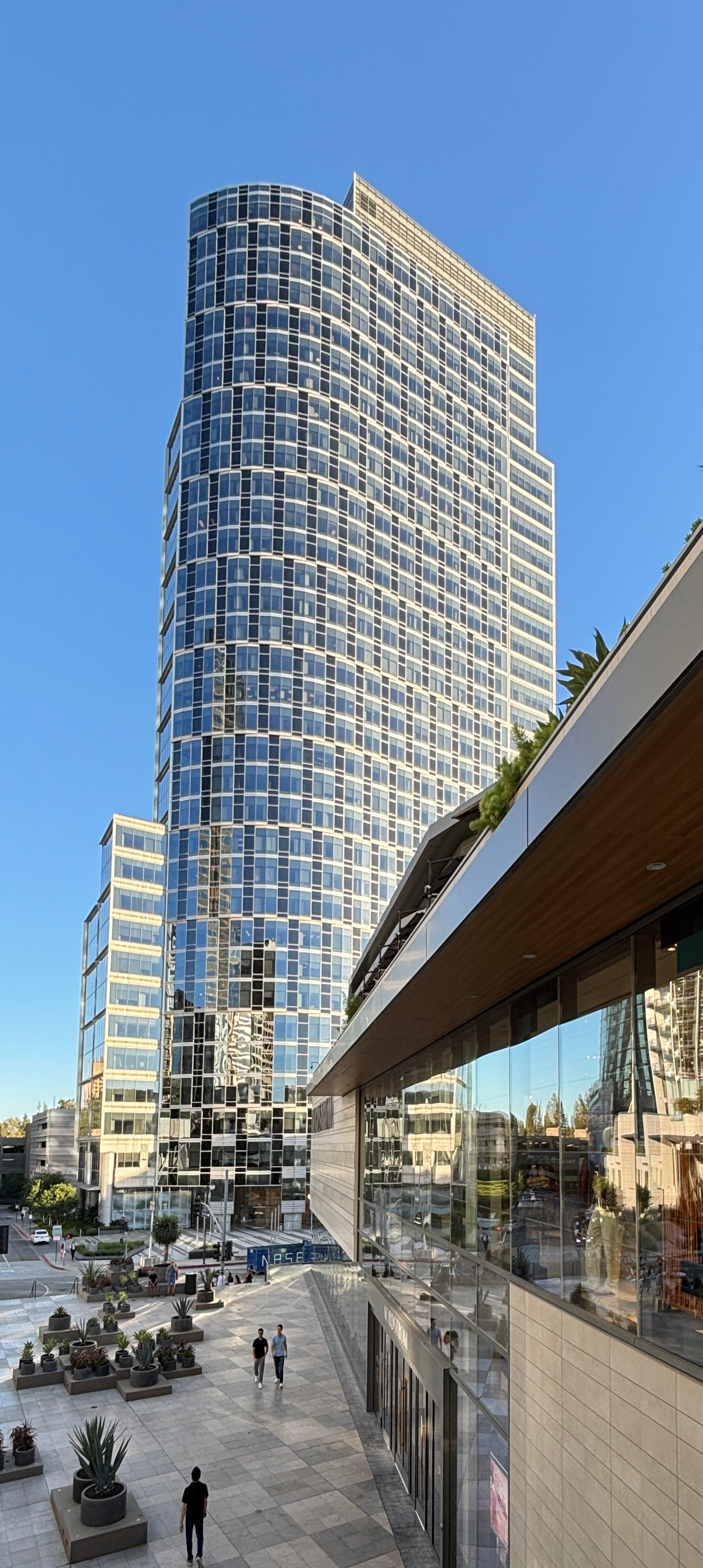
- Constellation Place seen from Westfield Century City in August 2024
- Interactive map of the Constellation Place area

General information
- Status: Completed
- Type: Commercial Offices
- Architectural style: Modernism
- Location: 10250 Constellation Boulevard; Century City, Los Angeles, California, U.S.
- Coordinates: 34.0571°N 118.4174°W
- Construction started: 2001
- Completed: 2003
- Cost: US$150 million
- Owner: JMB Realty

Height
- Roof: 149.5 m (490 ft)

Technical details
- Floor count: 35
- Floor area: 63,032 m^{2} (678,470 sq ft)
- Lifts/elevators: 23

Design and construction
- Architect: Johnson Fain Partners
- Structural engineer: Wong Hobach Lau
- Main contractor: Hathaway Dinwiddie

Constellation Place is a 35-story, 492-foot (150 m) skyscraper in Los Angeles, California, located in the community of Century City. It houses the headquarters of Houlihan Lokey, ICM Partners, Knight Law Group, and International Lease Finance Corporation (ILFC). The tower was originally built to house the corporate headquarters of Metro-Goldwyn-Mayer, but after its bankruptcy in 2010, MGM vacated the tower for a new headquarters in Beverly Hills the following year.

== History ==
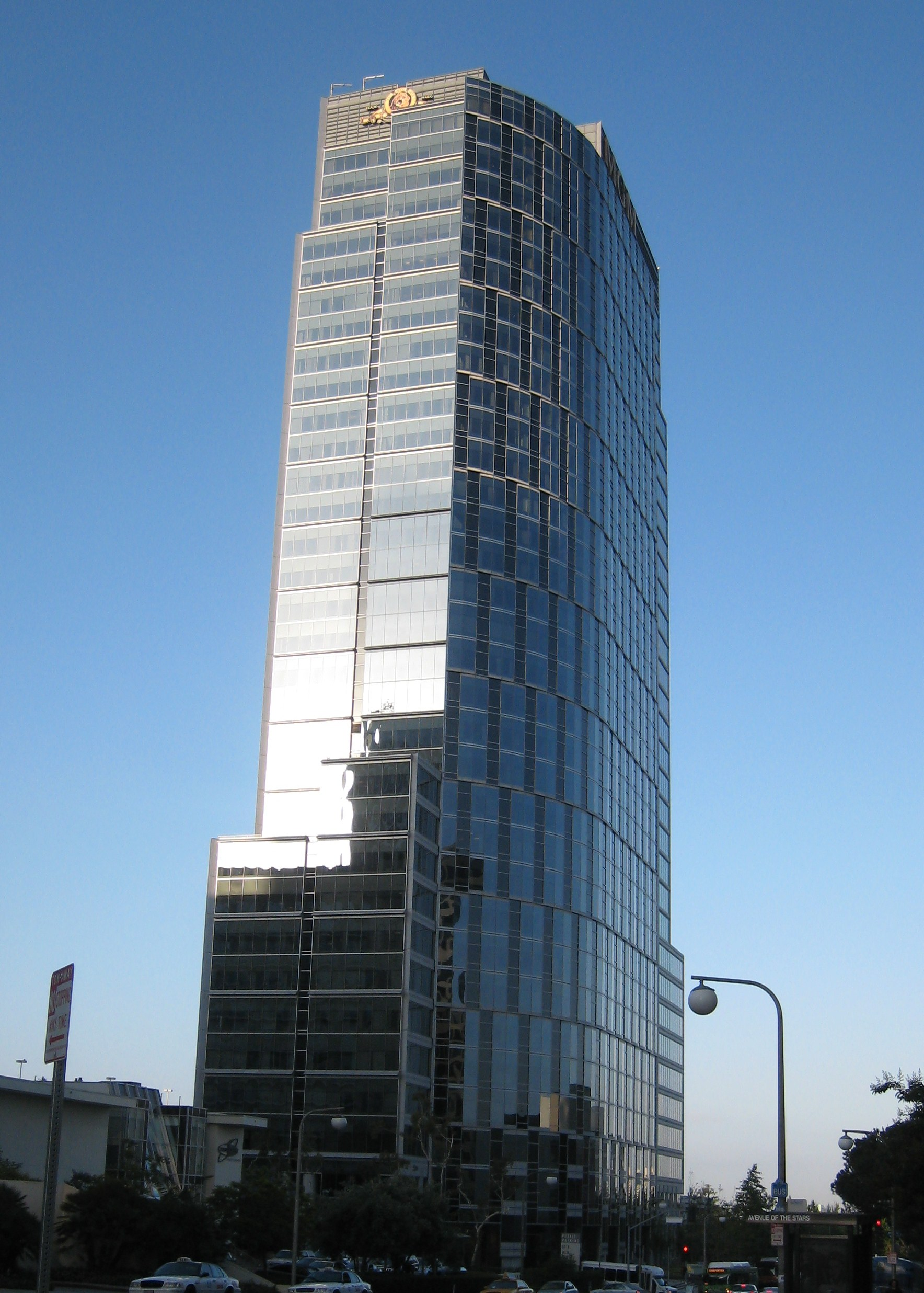
Tower with MGM logo on top

Constellation Place was constructed from 2001 to 2003. It is the 26th-tallest building in Los Angeles, and the fifth-tallest in Century City. It was the first high-rise to be completed in the 21st century in Los Angeles. The building was designed by Johnson Fain Partners, and has 700,000 sq ft (65,000 m^{2}) of Class A office space.

In 2000, Metro-Goldwyn-Mayer (MGM) announced that it was moving its headquarters to a newly constructed building in Century City. Halfway through the design building process, MGM agreed to be the lead tenant. The building opened in 2003 as the MGM Tower.

Alex Yemenidjian, a former chairperson and chief executive of MGM, devised the headquarters space. Roger Vincent and Claudia Eller of the Los Angeles Times said that "Yemenidjian spared no expense in building out the studio's space with such Las Vegas-style flourishes as towering marble pillars and a grand spiral staircase lined with a wall of awards."

Scott Johnson, the architect, designed the bottom third of the tower to have extra-large floors so MGM executives could have outdoor decks. The marble used in the MGM spaces was imported from Italy. MGM received a dedicated private garage, a dedicated security checkpoint, and a dedicated elevator bank. That way, celebrities who visited the complex could enter and exit the building without entering public spaces. Three screening rooms were placed in the tower. One of them was a 100-seat theater on the ground floor (removed in 2025). As of December 2010 ICM Partners controls the theater. The 14th floor lobby housed the executive suites and a wall of Oscar statuettes for Academy Award-winning films. The street that leads to the building's garage was renamed MGM Drive. A large MGM logo was placed at the top of the building. In December 2010 MGM rented 200,000 sq ft (19,000 m^{2}) of space in the MGM Tower, and it paid nearly $5 per square foot per month in rent.

In 2010, as MGM emerged from bankruptcy protection, it announced that it would move its headquarters to neighboring Beverly Hills to save money. The lease in Century City was scheduled to expire in 2018. Vincent and Eller said that MGM's per square foot monthly rent would be far lower in the Beverly Hills building than in the MGM Tower. Larry Kozmont, a real estate consultant not involved in the move, said "It's a prudent move for them. Downsizing and relocating to a space that is still prominent but not overly ostentatious and burdened by expenses is fundamental for their survival." MGM vacated the tower on August 19, 2011.

== Facilities ==
ICM Partners had its headquarters on the five top floors of the building.

As of 2012 it was noted as the first high-rise in Los Angeles to use electricity-generating fuel cells, called Bloom Energy Servers, as a source of power. The cells, which rely on hydrocarbons such as natural gas to generate power, may produce up to 400 kilowatts of power, which would supply one third of the electricity used to power the building.

== Tenants ==
- Houlihan Lokey headquarters – 4th, 5th, 6th Floors
- ICM Partners corporate headquarters
- International Lease Finance Corporation (ILFC) corporate headquarters - Suite 3400
- Fortress Investment Group – 16th floor
- Latham & Watkins
- Knight Law Group, LLP - Suites 2400 & 2500
- Macquarie Group – Suite 2250
- Ropes & Gray LLP
- Wilmington Trust - Suite 2800
- WeWork

== See also ==
- List of tallest buildings in Los Angeles
