= Louis Gonda =

American businessman

- Born: Louis L. Gonda; 1949 or 1950 (age 76–77)
- Education: University of California, Los Angeles
- Occupation: Businessman
- Known for: Co-founded International Lease Finance Corporation
- Spouse: Kelly Gonda
- Children: 5
- Parent: Leslie Gonda
- Relatives: Logan Green (son-in-law)

Louis L. Gonda (born 1949/1950) is an American businessman, active in commercial real estate and venture capital.

== Early life ==
He is the son of Leslie Gonda, a Hungarian-born American businessman and Holocaust survivor, and his wife Susan.

He has a bachelor's degree from the University of California, Los Angeles.

== Career ==
He and his father started a company, International Lease Finance Corporation, which was sold to American International Group (AIG) in 1990, after which he was an AIG executive vice president until his retirement in 1995.

Since 1995, he has run Lexington Commercial Holdings, which looks after his interests in commercial real estate and venture capital.

In 2000, his net worth was estimated at $2 billion, and in 2006, at $1.9 billion. In 2009, it was reported that after the 2008 financial crisis and the fall in the AIG share price from $70 to $2, Gonda was looking to sell assets, including "an eight-bedroom, $35-million Beverly Hills mansion, a $43-million Gulfstream V corporate jet and a $3-million beachfront home". In 2009, Gonda was no longer on the Forbes list of billionaires.

Gonda is president of Lexington Commercial Holdings, chairman of Lexington Ventures, and a director of Trethera Corporation.

== Personal life ==
He is married to Broadway producer Kelly Gonda, daughter of actress Honey Sanders. They have five children.

His daughter, Eva Gonda Green, is married to Logan Green, co-founder of Lyft.
