= GCA Corporation =

Multinational investment bank

- Formerly: GCA Savvian Corporation
- Industry: Investment banking
- Founded: 2003; 23 years ago
- Defunct: October 4, 2021
- Fate: Acquired by Houlihan Lokey
- Headquarters: One Maritime Plaza, San Francisco, US
- Number of locations: 23 offices (2020)
- Key people: Geoffrey Baldwin, (Co-CEO, Managing Director & Head of Mergers and Acquisitions) Todd Carter, (Co-CEO, Managing Director & Member of Executive Management) Blake Christensen, (Director)
- Number of employees: 450+ (2020)
- Subsidiaries: GCA Altium
- Website: gcaglobal.com

GCA Corporation (formerly GCA Savvian Corporation) was a multinational investment bank headquartered in San Francisco, United States. It was sold to Houlihan Lokey in October 2021.

== Services ==
The company offers financial services including mergers and acquisitions advisory services for both public and private companies in buyside, sellside and going-private transactions. The company provides services for hostile defenses, reorganization proceedings, recapitalizations and restructuring services. The company also provides restructuring advisory services and capital markets services, such as placement of common and preferred stock, mezzanine debt, convertible debt, equity lines and roll-up financings, as well as initial public offering advisory services. In addition, it offers secondary direct placement and due diligence and invests in private equity, mezzanine financing, and public equity and debt markets. The company provides its services primarily to technology, media, communications, healthcare, consumer and retail and industrial sectors. The company owned 13 subsidiaries as of December 31, 2012.

In April 2014, GCA Savvian established a Tokyo-based wholly owned subsidiary.

== Merger with Altium Capital ==
On 9 May 2016, GCA Savvian Corporation signed an agreement to merge with Altium Capital (also known as Altium Corporate Finance Group). The merger was completed on 31 July 2016. The combination creates a leading independent international investment bank that operates under the names GCA Altium in Europe and GCA in the United States and Asia. Under the terms of the agreement, a share-for-share exchange took place whereby GCA acquired the entire issued share capital of Altium in exchange for shares in GCA.

== Acquisition by Houlihan Lokey ==
On October 4, 2021 GCA Corporation was acquired by Houlihan Lokey.

== Recent activities ==
- October 2020: Advised EnPro Industries on its acquisition of Alluxa, Inc.
- August 2020: Advised Luminar on its announced $3.4B merger with Gores Metropoulos
- June 2014: Advised Aptina Imaging on its acquisition of On Semiconductor for $400 million
- February 2014: Advised Japanese firm Toray Industries on its purchase of Zoltek for $584 million
- November 2012: Advised, along with Bank of America Merrill Lynch, Daikin Industries on its purchase of Goodman Global for $3.7 billion
- September 2012: Advised Quest Software on its sale to Dell for $2.4 billion
- March 2011: Advised Advantest on its acquisition of Verigy for $1.1 billion

== Management ==
- Geoffrey Baldwin: Co-CEO, Managing Director & Head of Mergers and Acquisitions
- Todd Carter: Co-CEO, Managing Director & Member of Executive Management
- Blake Christensen: Director
- Aaron Cohen: CFO – North America
