= International Lease Finance Corporation =

Former US aircraft lessor

International Lease Finance Corporation (ILFC)
- Type: Division
- Industry: Aircraft leasing and sales
- Founded: July 1973; 53 years ago
- Headquarters: Constellation Place; Los Angeles, California, U.S.
- Key people: Henri Courpron, CEO; Fred Cromer, President
- Revenue: ▲US$4.73 billion (2007)
- Net income: ▲US$604 million (2007)
- Number of employees: 290 (March 2013)
- Parent: AerCap

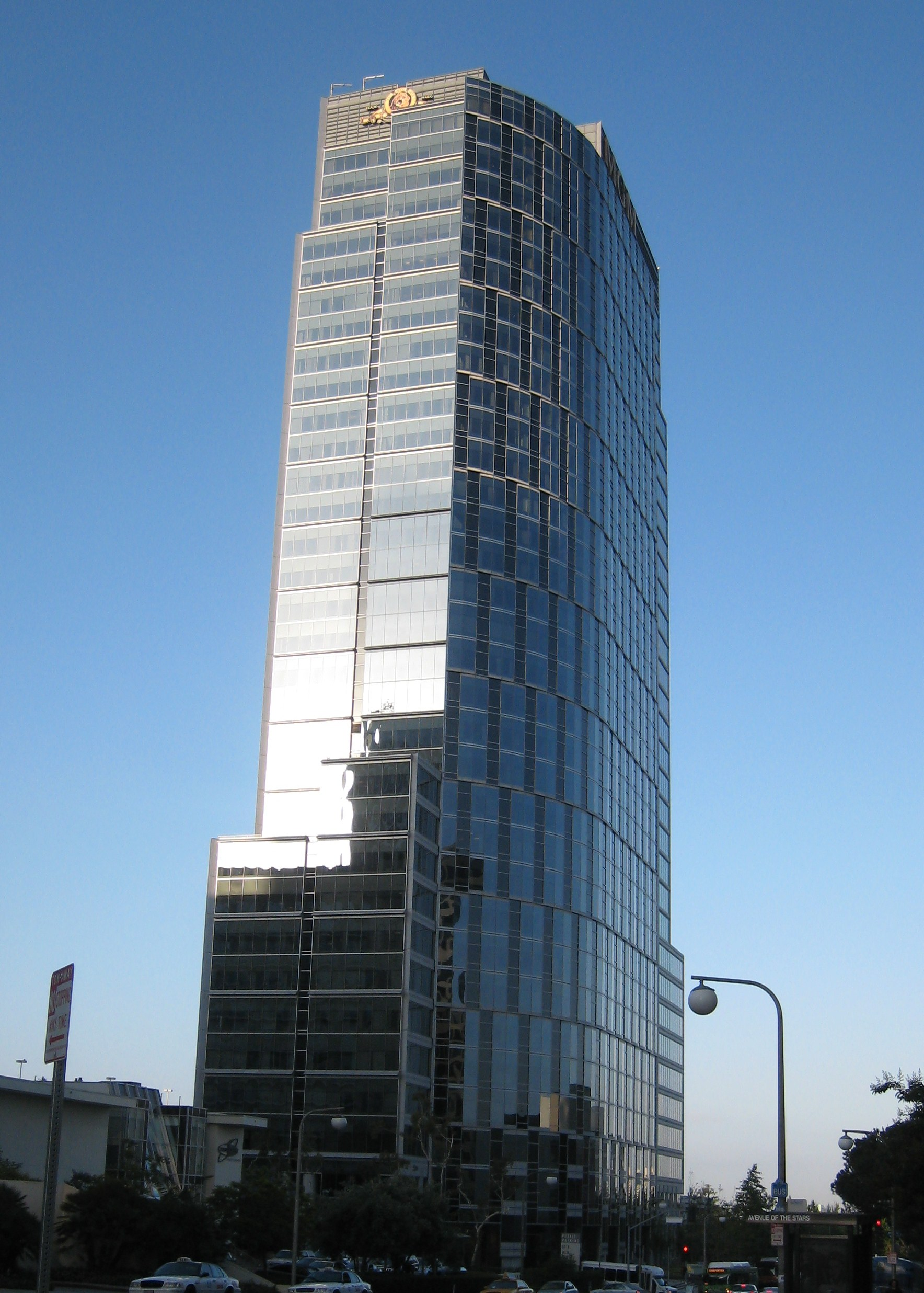
Corporate headquarters, Constellation Place

The International Lease Finance Corporation (ILFC) was an aircraft lessor headquartered in Century City.

It was the world's largest aircraft lessor by value, though ILFC's rival, General Electric's GECAS unit, had more aircraft. It leased Boeing and Airbus aircraft to major airlines worldwide.

== History ==
Father and son team Leslie Gonda and Louis L. Gonda founded ILFC in 1973 along with Steven F. Udvar-Házy. The company was acquired by international insurance giant American International Group (AIG) in 1990, although the unit was still run by Udvar-Hazy until he retired in February 2010, when he was succeeded by vice-chairman Alan Lund. Henri Courpron, a former Airbus executive, was appointed president and CEO of ILFC in May 2010.

On September 2, 2011, AIG filed with the SEC to spin off ILFC in an initial public offering.

In December 2012, AIG announced that it was selling a 90% stake in the company to a consortium of Chinese companies consisting of New China Trust, New China Life Insurance, P3 Investments and the China Aviation Industrial Fund to raise funds to repay its US$182B government bailout.

In August 2013, two of the Chinese companies withdrew their involvement in the deal. AIG had given a deadline for the completion of the deal as August 31, 2013, and alternatives were considered, such as an initial public offering.

On December 16, 2013, AIG announced they were selling its entire stake in ILFC to AerCap Holdings N.V.

== Headquarters ==
The ILFC was headquartered in Suite 3400 of the Constellation Place (formerly MGM Tower) in Century City, Los Angeles, California. ILFC has its headquarters on the top six floors of the building, with 290 employees as of March 2013. The CEO's penthouse office had a working fireplace.
