= Air Lease Corporation =

American aircraft leasing company

- Company type: Private
- Traded as: NYSE: AL
- Industry: Aircraft leasing
- Founded: February 2010; 16 years ago
- Founders: Steven F. Udvar-Házy; John Plueger
- Headquarters: Los Angeles, California, U.S.
- Revenue: US$1.5 billion (2017)
- Net income: US$756 million (2017)
- Number of employees: 129 (2021)
- Parent: Sumitomo Corporation
- Website: sumisho.aero

Air Lease Corporation (ALC) was an American aircraft leasing company founded in 2010 and headed by Steven F. Udvar-Házy. Air Lease purchased new commercial aircraft through direct orders from Boeing, Airbus, Embraer and ATR, and leased them to its airline customers worldwide through specialized aircraft leasing and financing.

Air Lease provided airlines with net operating leases, which require the lessee to pay for maintenance, insurance, taxes and all other aircraft operating expenses during the lease term.

As of March 2024, Air Lease owned 472 aircraft: 354 narrowbody aircraft, and 118 widebody aircraft, in addition to 320 aircraft on order.

In September 2025, Air Lease announced that it had entered into a definitive agreement to be acquired by a consortium of Sumitomo Corporation, SMBC Aviation Capital, Apollo, and Brookfield, with the transaction expected to be closed by the first quarter of FY2026, at which point Air Lease Corporation will be renamed Sumisho Air Lease Corporation. This acquisition was closed in April 2026.

== History ==
Steven Udvar-Házy, chairman and chief executive of Air Lease, was a founder of Century City, CA-based aircraft leasing giant International Lease Finance Corp. (ILFC) and stayed on as chief executive after it was sold to American International Group (AIG) in 1990. Udvar-Házy left ILFC to start Air Lease in 2010 following a dispute with AIG.

Udvar-Házy started Air Lease in February 2010 with former ILFC chief operating officer John Plueger, who has the same role at the new company. On April 19, 2011, AL had an initial public offering of Class A stock on the New York Stock Exchange, and raised an estimated total of US$965.6 million.Udvar-Hazy, estimated by Forbes in 2015 to have a net worth of $3.7 billion, has a 7 percent stake.

=== Aircraft leasing ===
At the 2019 Paris Air Show Virgin Atlantic signed a deal for up to 20 Airbus A330-900 aircraft making it the first UK customer for the aircraft. Eight aircraft will come directly from Airbus, six from Air Lease Corporation and it has options on a further six aircraft. They will replace older Airbus A330-200s and -300s and deliveries are expected from September 2021 to 2024.

At the same venue Air Lease Corporation signed a deal for 29 Airbus A321XLR aircraft, as well as a letter of intent for 50 Airbus A220-300 aircraft.

=== Acquisition ===
On September 2, 2025, Air Lease announced that it is expected to be acquired by a consortium of Sumitomo Corporation, SMBC Aviation Capital, Apollo, and Brookfield, for approximately US$ 7.4 billion with stockholders receiving $65 per share. The acquisition was closed in April 2026 at which point Air Lease Corporation was renamed Sumisho Air Lease Corporation.
