= Bruggisser =

Bruggisser is a surname. Notable people with the surname include:

- Phillip Bruggisser (born 1991), Danish ice hockey player
- Philippe Bruggisser (born 1948), Swiss chief executive

== See also ==
- Brisa Bruggesser
