= British Asia Airways =

Airline of the United Kingdom

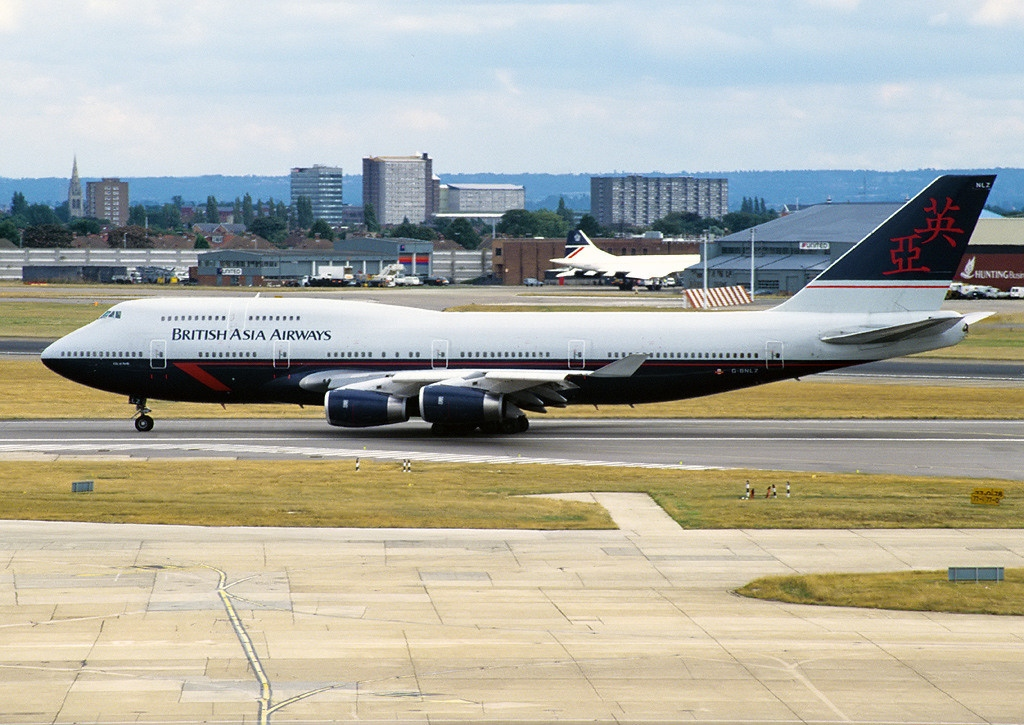
- British Asia Airways Boeing 747-400, 1994
IATA	ICAO	Call sign
BR	BAW	SPEEDBIRD
- Founded: 20 January 1993
- Commenced operations: 29 March 1993
- Ceased operations: December 2001
- Hubs: Heathrow; Taoyuan
- Focus cities: London; Taipei
- Frequent-flyer program: Executive Club
- Alliance: Oneworld
- Fleet size: 3
- Parent company: British Airways
- Headquarters: Taipei, Taiwan

British Asia Airways
- Traditional Chinese: 英亞航空
- Simplified Chinese: 英亚航空
- Literal meaning: England Asia Aviation
Transcriptions
Standard Mandarin
- Hanyu Pinyin: Yīng Yà Hángkōng
- Wade–Giles: Ying Ya Hang-k'ung
Yue: Cantonese
- Yale Romanization: Yīng A Hòhnghūng
- Jyutping: Jing1 Aa3 Hong4hung1
Southern Min
- Hokkien POJ: Eng A Hâng-khong

British Asia Airways (Chinese: 英亞航空) was a subsidiary of British Airways founded due to the legal status of Taiwan and territory disputes with China in order to allow British Airways to continue flying to Taiwan from the United Kingdom.

== History ==
Due to political sensitivities, national airlines operating flights to China were not permitted to fly to Taiwan. Similar arrangements were made by other airlines, such as Japan Airlines, KLM, Qantas, Swissair and Air France. Lufthansa provided service to Taipei under the name of its then subsidiary, Condor.

British Asia Airways commenced operations in March 1993 with Boeing 747-400s repainted with the Union Flag tail fin replaced by the Chinese characters 英亞 (Hanyu Pinyin: Yīng Yà; that translates as "British Asia"). The airline flew between Taipei and Hong Kong using the code BR, which BA had inherited from British Caledonian, while the flight from London used BA.

The airline ceased operations after British Airways ceased flights to Taipei in December 2001.

== See also ==
Airlines created for political reasons:

- Air France Asie
- Air Sinai
- Australia Asia Airlines
- Japan Asia Airways
- KLM Asia
- Swissair Asia
