= Philippe Bruggisser =

Swiss manager in the airline industry

Philippe Bruggisser (born 11 September 1948 in Wohlen, Aargau) is a Swiss manager in the airline industry. In 1996 and 2000/01 he was Chief Operating Officer (COO) of Swissair and President of the SAir Group Executive Committee in the period from 1997 to 2001. The growth strategy pursued by him, which had aimed at establishing an own aviation alliance, was largely responsible for the bankruptcy of Swissair in October 2001.

== Biography ==
=== Training and career ===
After attending primary school and the district school in Wohlen, he attended a seminary in Wettingen from 1964 to 1969, interrupted by a one-year stay as a visiting student in the United States. He then studied economics at the University of Basel as well as business and law at the University of Geneva. His professional career began in 1976 as Assistant Director-General of the Swiss Bank Corporation.

In 1979, Bruggisser joined Swissair and worked as a controller. In 1984, he was appointed chief financial officer of the Swissair North America sector, and from 1987 to 1990 he was head of the controlling department. After a short stint as project manager of a profit improvement program, he took over the directorate chairman's post of Swissair Holdings AG in 1991, a position he held until 1995. In addition, from 1992 to 1994, he was a member of Swissair's management. Under Bruggisser's leadership Swissair acquired the catering section of SAS Scandinavian Airlines. In 1995 he was a member of the Swissair Group Executive Committee.

=== Swissair chief ===
In 1996, Bruggisser took over as chief operating officer for the operational management of the Group and also served as Deputy Chief Executive Officer. The following year, he undertook a comprehensive restructuring of the Group, the SAirGroup was created with Swissair now being one of several subsidiaries. In 1997, Bruggisser assumed the post of Executive President, the operational management of Swissair. After the project "Alcazar" - a group of Swissair, KLM, SAS and Austrian Airlines - had failed in 1993, he followed the advice of the management consultant McKinsey to up SAir's own alliance. This risky "Hunter Strategy" provided for the purchase of airline companies and investments.

The first step in 1996 was a stake in Belgium's Sabena. Under the leadership of Swissair, the airline alliance Qualiflyer Group was founded in 1998. Other interests in the Italian Volare, Air Littoral of France and the German LTU were added. Initially positive annual results in 1997 and 1998 spurred the board to continue the strategy. The crash of Swissair Flight 111 overshadowed the fiscal year 1998. Delta Air Lines announced in 1999 the interruption of the cooperation with Swissair and Austrian Airlines and left the Qualiflyer Group.

Despite these setbacks, Bruggisser held steadfastly to the Hunter strategy. It was followed by investments in the South African Airways, the French companies AOM, Air Littoral and Air Liberté, the Italian Air Europe and the LOT Polish Airlines. He also initiated the purchase of interests in the Portuguese companies TAP and Portugália. Most of these companies were in need of recapitalisation, so in addition to the purchase price, capital for restructuring had to be invested.

In July 2000, Bruggisser temporarily took over the operational management of Swissair. He then came under public pressure, when the ailing financial situation of the SAir Group became known. On average, the daily loss of Swissair and Sabena was recorded at about one million CHF each, with another million going every day into LTU and the French interests. The administrative board began to order exit scenarios from the received shares in other airlines and dismissed Bruggisser in January 2001 with immediate effect. His successors, Moritz Suter and Mario Corti could not prevent the collapse of the Group in October 2001 and its liquidation in March 2002.

=== Aftermath ===
As a result, the press published that Bruggisser was primarily responsible for the expansion and the demise of Swissair. Bruggisser initially largely withdrew from public life. In November 2006, he failed in his attempt to be elected to the Board of the South African Airways.

The prosecutor of the Canton of Zurich brought charges against Bruggisser and another 18 people in March 2006 in connection with the Swissair bankruptcy case. They were accused of forging documents, mismanagement and damage to creditors among other things. Bruggisser was charged with false certification.

From 2009 to 2010 Brugisser was again active in the aviation industry as CEO and chairman of VistaJet.
