= Swissair Flight 316 =

1979 aviation accident

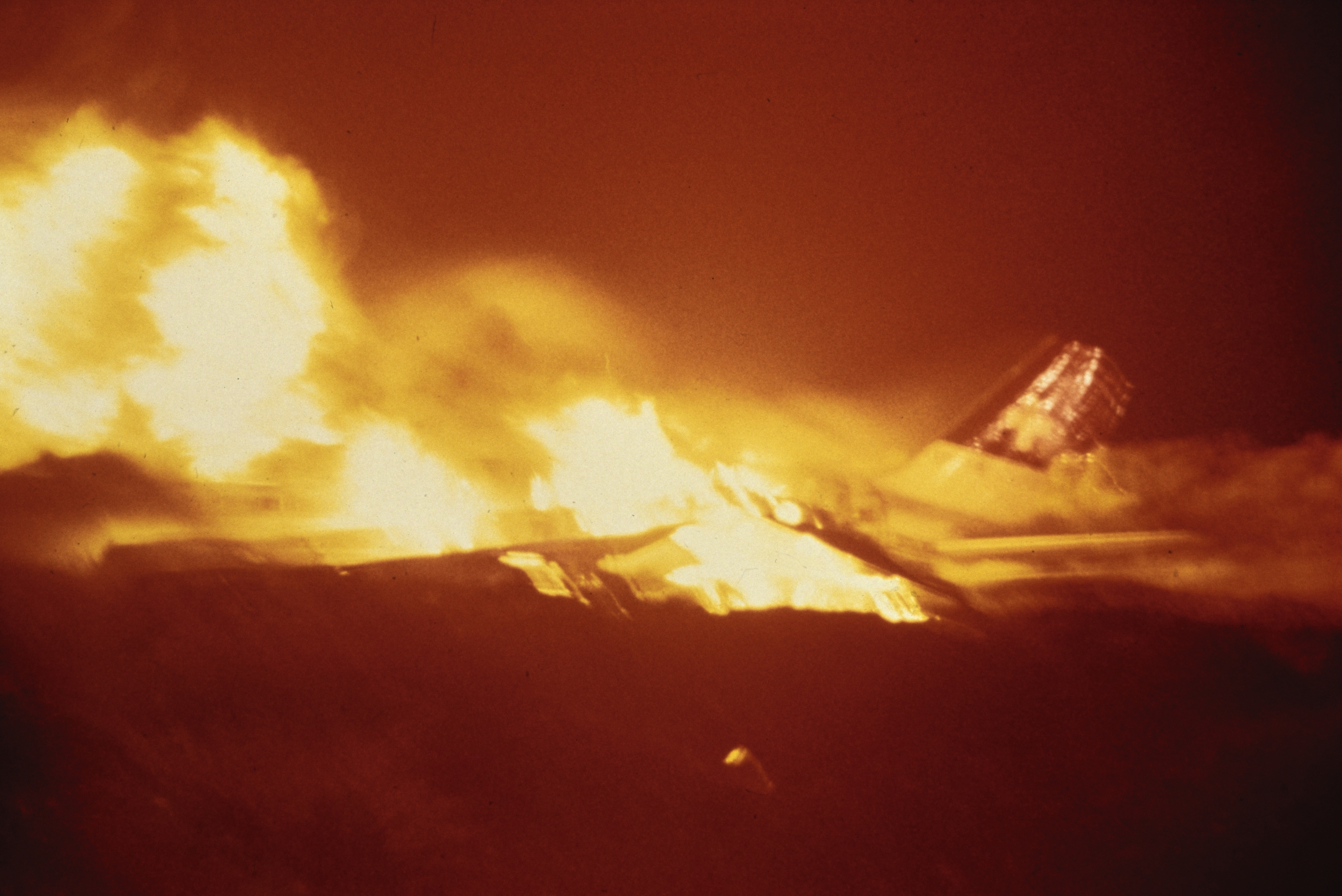
- Flight 316 on fire after landing

Accident
- Date: 7 October 1979
- Summary: Runway overrun
- Site: Ellinikon International Airport, Athens, Greece; 37°52′26″N 23°44′27″E

Aircraft
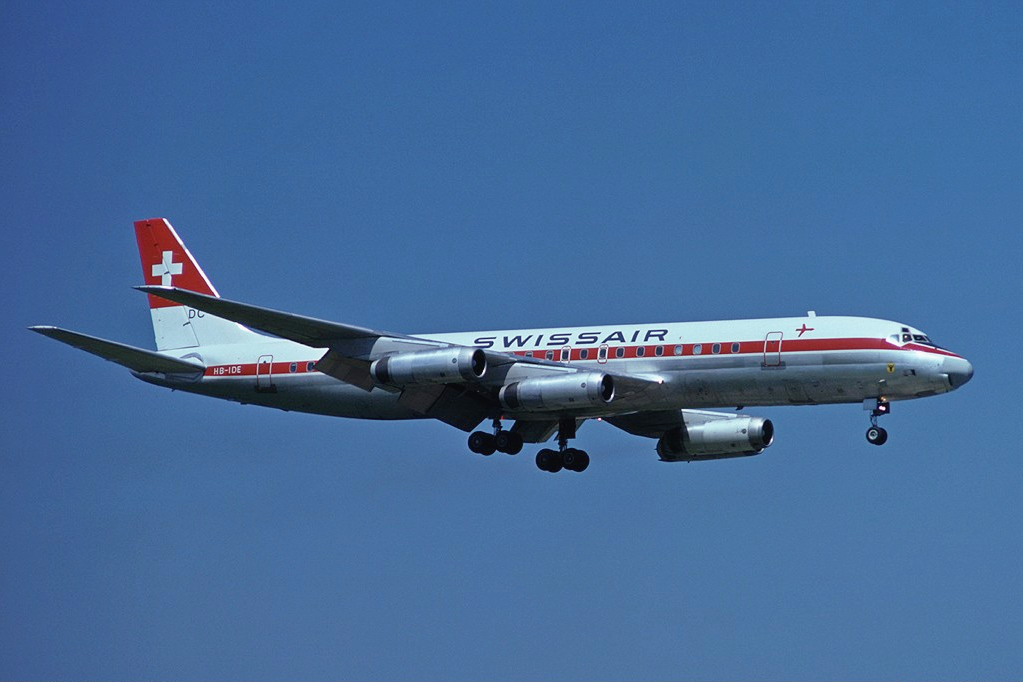
- HB-IDE, the aircraft involved, seen in 1977
- Aircraft type: McDonnell Douglas DC-8-62
- Aircraft name: Uri
- Operator: Swissair
- Registration: HB-IDE
- Flight origin: Zurich Airport, Zurich, Switzerland
- 1st stopover: Geneva Airport, Geneva, Switzerland
- 2nd stopover: Ellinikon International Airport, Athens, Greece
- Last stopover: Chhatrapati Shivaji Maharaj International Airport, Bombay, India
- Destination: Beijing Capital International Airport, Beijing, China
- Occupants: 154
- Passengers: 142
- Crew: 12
- Fatalities: 14
- Injuries: 10
- Survivors: 140

On 7 October 1979, a Swissair DC-8 crashed while landing at Athens-Ellinikon International Airport in Athens, Greece. Of the 154 passengers and crew on board, 14 were killed in the accident.

== Accident ==
Swissair Flight 316 was an international scheduled passenger service from Zurich, Switzerland to Peking, China (now Beijing) via Geneva, Athens, and Bombay (now Mumbai). The aircraft, named Uri, was piloted by Captain Fritz Schmutz and First Officer Martin Deuringer.

Flight 316 touched down on runway 15L at a speed of 146 knots (270 km/h; 168 mph), decelerated, but overran the runway and came to rest on a public road. The left wing and tail separated, and fire broke out. Fourteen of the 142 passengers on board died. Among the dead were British, German, and French citizens. Of the passengers on board, 100 were doctors on their way to a medical convention in China.

One of Flight 316's survivors was Hans Morgenthau, a professor emeritus from the University of Chicago and expert in International Relations.

== Aftermath ==
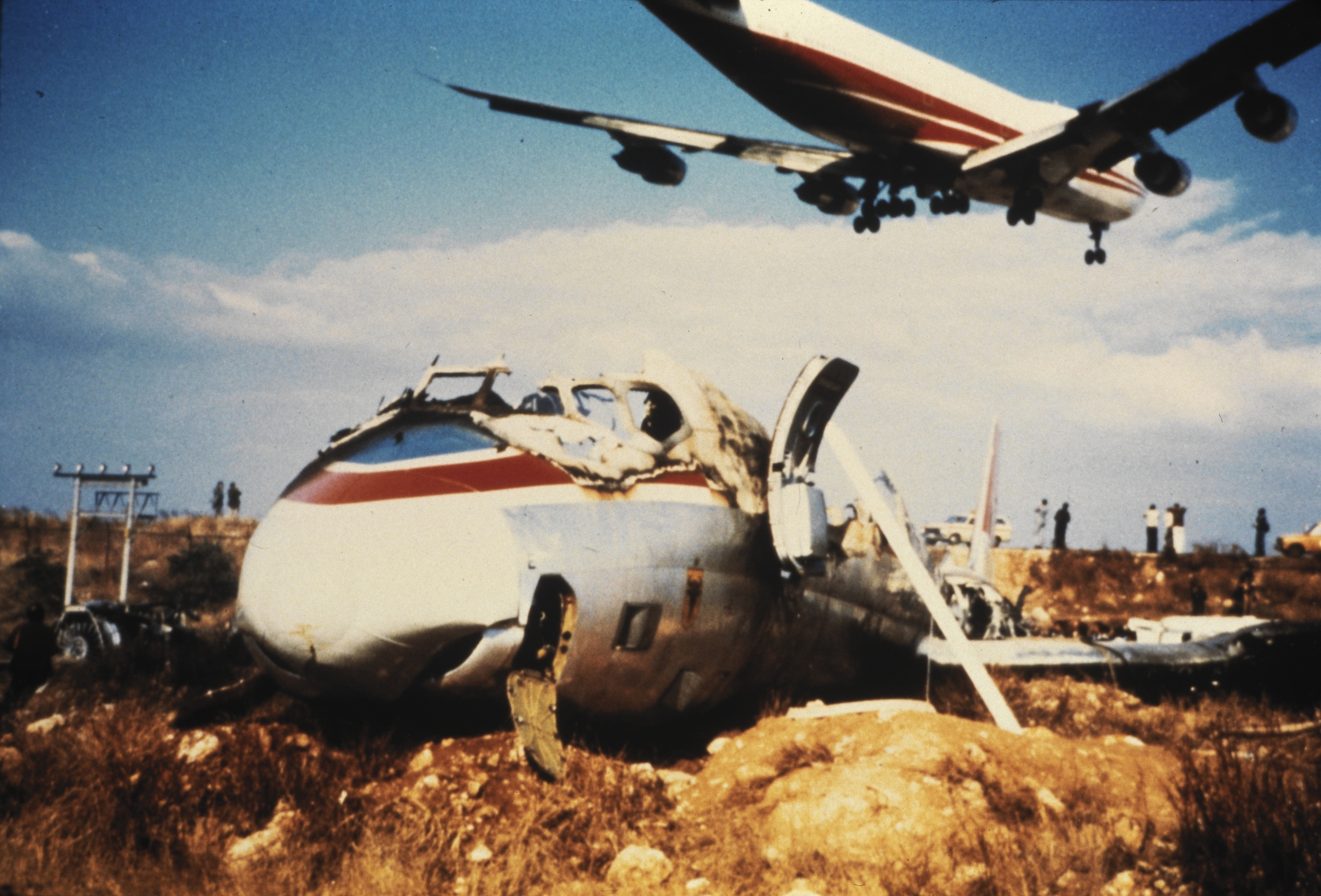
Burned aircraft after the crash

After the crash it was learned that the aircraft was transporting over 1,000 pounds (450 kg) of radioactive isotopes and a small amount of plutonium. The plutonium was in the luggage of one of the doctors on board, and was briefly missing in the aftermath of the crash, although it was quickly found. Authorities had firemen and other rescue workers checked for radiation exposure.

The crash destroyed over $2 million worth of industrial diamonds bound for Bombay. Most of the uncut diamonds were found by police, but they were destroyed by the crash's intense heat.

Two days after the crash of Flight 316, Greek authorities charged pilot Fritz Schmutz with manslaughter plus other charges. At a trial in 1983, Schmutz, along with co-pilot Deuringer, were found guilty of multiple charges including manslaughter with negligence, causing multiple bodily injury, and obstructing air traffic, and were sentenced to five and two and a half years in prison respectively. Schmutz and Deuringer were set free on bail while they appealed their sentences. A year after their sentencing, the court ruled Schmutz and Deuringer could substitute fines in place of jail time. Neither pilot had flown since the accident, but they were employed by Swissair.

== Cause ==
The accident investigation determined that the crew touched down too far down the runway, at too high a speed, following a non-stabilised approach, and that they failed to properly utilise the aircraft's brake and reverse thrust systems, resulting in the aircraft being unable to stop within the available runway and overrun distance.

One member of the operations team of the Accident Investigation Committee had a different opinion from the rest of the committee regarding the cause of the accident, stating that he believed the crew failed to realise the touchdown speed and distance, failed to follow the company's poor-braking-action landing technique, and failed to properly utilise the aircraft's brake and reverse thrust systems.
