= Australia Asia Airlines =

Airline of Australia and Taiwan (1990–1996)

IATA	ICAO	Call sign
IM	AAU	AUSTASIA
- Founded: 1990
- Commenced operations: 1990
- Ceased operations: 1996
- Frequent-flyer program: Qantas Frequent Flyer
- Fleet size: 3
- Destinations: Sydney; Taipei–Taoyuan
- Parent company: Qantas
- Headquarters: Botany Bay, Sydney, New South Wales, Australia
- Key people: James Strong (CEO)

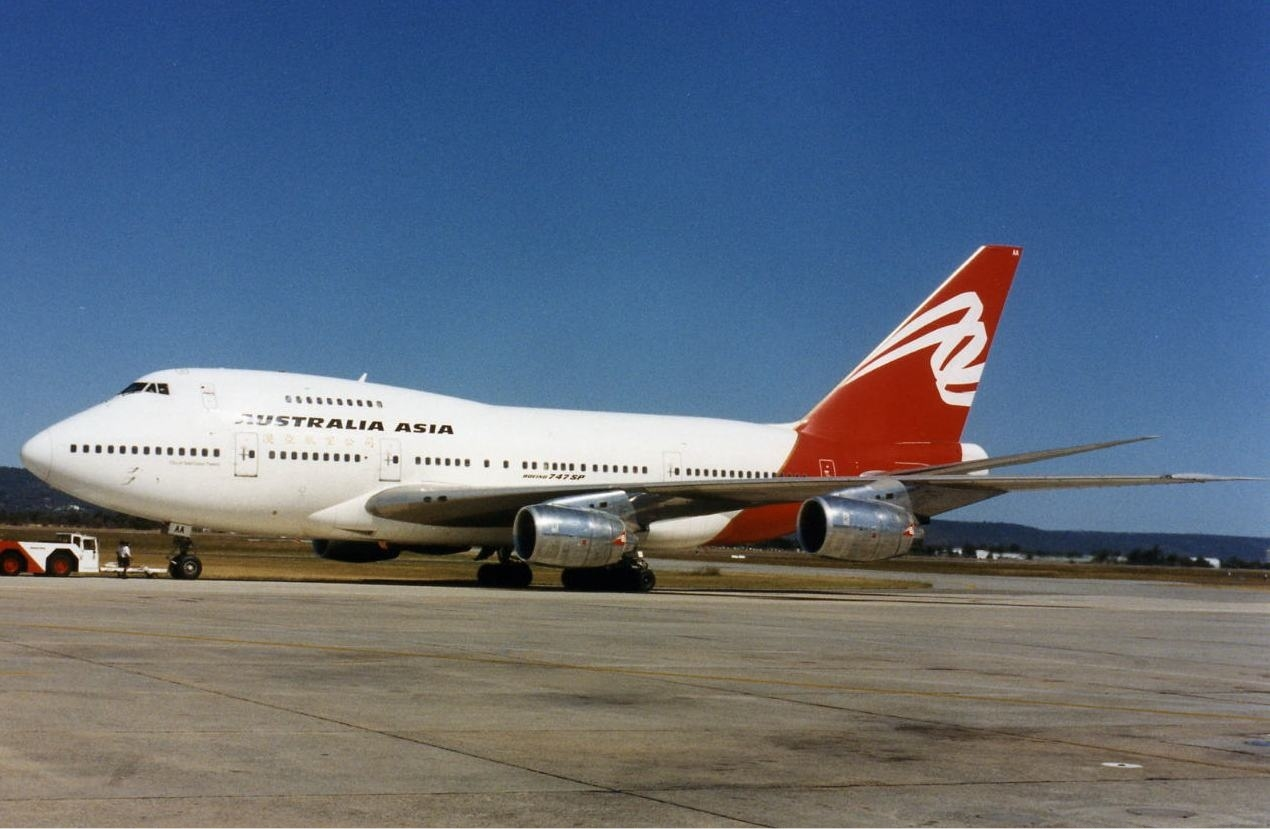
Australia Asia Airlines Boeing 747SP at Perth Airport in the mid-1990s.

Australia Asia Airlines (澳亞航空公司 Àoyà Hángkōng Gōngsī) was a subsidiary of Qantas founded due to the legal status of the Republic of China (Taiwan) and territory disputes with the People's Republic of China in order to allow Qantas to continue flying to Taiwan from Australia.

== History ==
The subsidiary was established due to the People's Republic of China's objection to national carriers of countries with which it had diplomatic relations flying to Taiwan (Republic of China), which the former regarded as a breakaway province.

The airline operated two Boeing 747SPs and a Boeing 767 seconded from the Qantas fleet, repainted in a modified livery, which did not display the Flag of Australia, or the kangaroo logo, which was replaced by a dynamic ribbon. It initially flew its flights using the IATA code IM but switched to Qantas's QF in 1994, according to History of Qantas.

Australia Asia Airlines ceased operations in 1996 as Qantas could by then serve Taiwan in its own right due to it being completely privatized. Australia Asia Airlines' aircraft were then returned to Qantas service.

== Destinations ==
=== Asia ===
- Philippines
  - Manila – Ninoy Aquino International Airport (Stop-over)
- Republic of China (Taiwan)
  - Taipei – Chiang Kai-shek International Airport

=== Oceania ===
- Australia
  - Sydney – Kingsford Smith Airport (Base)

== Fleet ==
- 2 Boeing 747SP
- 1 Boeing 767-300ER

== See also ==
- British Asia Airways
- Japan Asia Airways
- KLM Asia
- Swissair Asia
- Air France Asie
- Foreign relations of Taiwan § Air links
