= Swissair Asia =

Airline of Switzerland and Taiwan (1995–2001)

Swissair Asia AG 瑞士亞洲航空
IATA	ICAO	Call sign
SR	SWR	SWISSAIR
- Founded: 18 January 1995
- Commenced operations: 7 April 1995
- Ceased operations: 31 March 2002
- Focus cities: Taipei–Taoyuan; Zurich
- Frequent-flyer program: Qualiflyer
- Fleet size: 6
- Destinations: 3
- Parent company: Swissair

Swissair Asia
- Traditional Chinese: 瑞士亞洲航空
- Simplified Chinese: 瑞士亚洲航空
Transcriptions
Standard Mandarin
- Hanyu Pinyin: Ruìshì Yàzhōu Hángkōng
- Wade–Giles: Jui-shih Ya-chou Hang-k'ung
Southern Min
- Hokkien POJ: Sūi-sū A-chiu Hâng-khong

Swissair Asia was a subsidiary of Swissair founded due to the legal status of the Republic of China (Taiwan) and territory disputes with the People's Republic of China in order to allow Swissair to continue flying to Taiwan from Switzerland.

== History ==
Swissair Asia was formed to serve Taipei, Taiwan, within the Republic of China, while Swissair maintained service to the People's Republic of China. It began operating a twice-weekly service between Zürich and Taipei via Bangkok on 7 April 1995. The airline ceased operations when the parent company Swissair went bankrupt in 2001; no successor airline was organized by Swissair's own successor, Swiss International Air Lines, which does not operate flights to Taipei (either directly or under a subsidiary).

== Livery ==
The aircraft used by Swissair Asia had the Chinese character "瑞" (ruì), the Chinese character for "propitious" or "lucky" and first character in the phonetic (in southern Chinese languages) translation of Switzerland, "瑞士" (Jyutping: seoi6 si6; Pha̍k-fa-sṳ: Sui-sṳ; Pe̍h-ōe-jī: Sūi-sū; Pinyin: Ruìshì), on the tail fin instead of the Swiss cross. The kanji character was designed by the Basel-based Japanese calligrapher Sanae Sakamoto (坂本 早苗, Sakamoto Sanae).

== Destinations ==
=== Asia ===
- Thailand
  - Bangkok – Don Mueang International Airport (Stop-over)
- Republic of China (Taiwan)
  - Taipei – Chiang Kai-shek International Airport (Focus city)

=== Europe ===
- Switzerland
  - Zurich – Zurich Airport (Focus city)

== Fleet ==
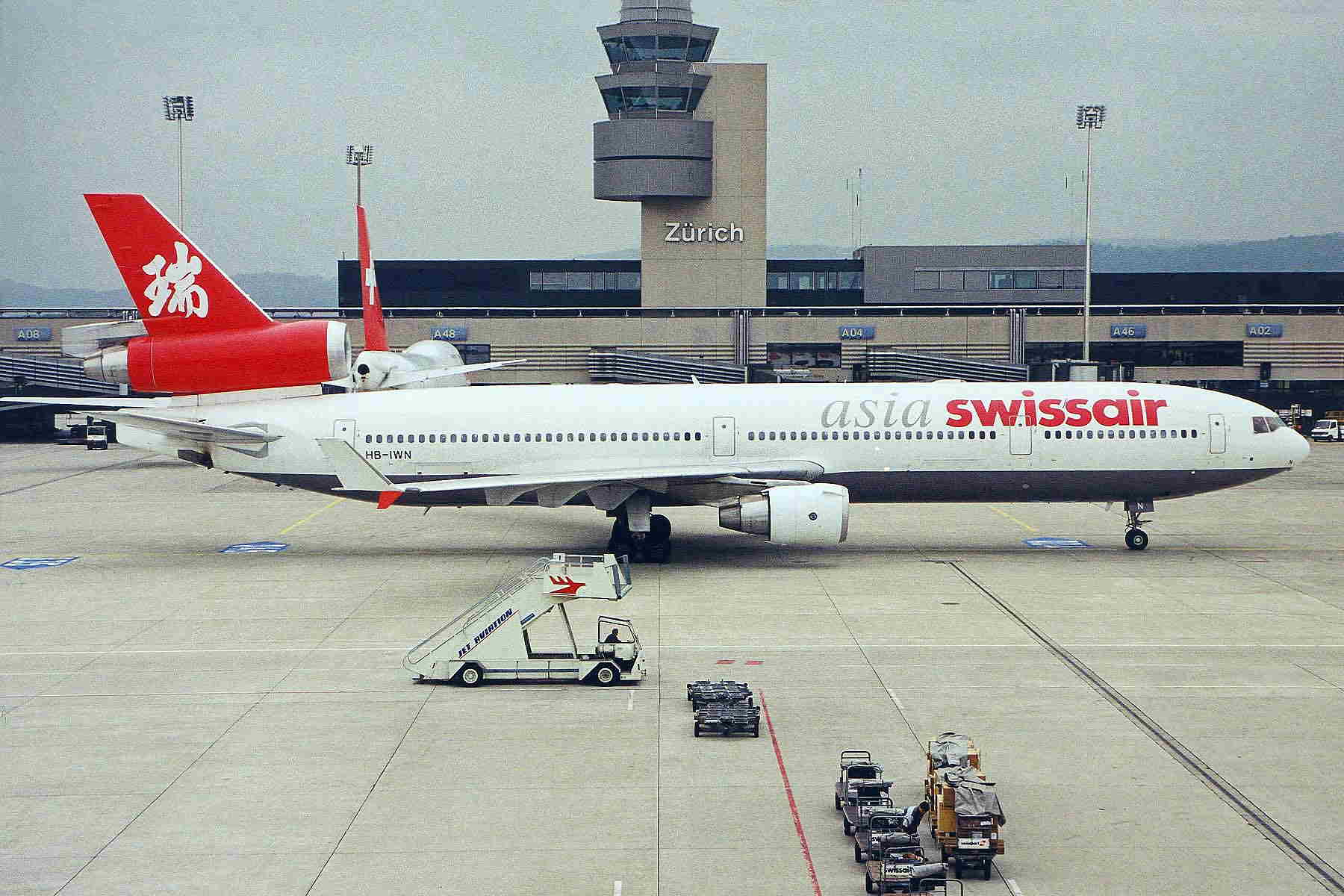
A Swissair Asia McDonnell Douglas MD-11 taxiing at Zurich Airport in August 1999

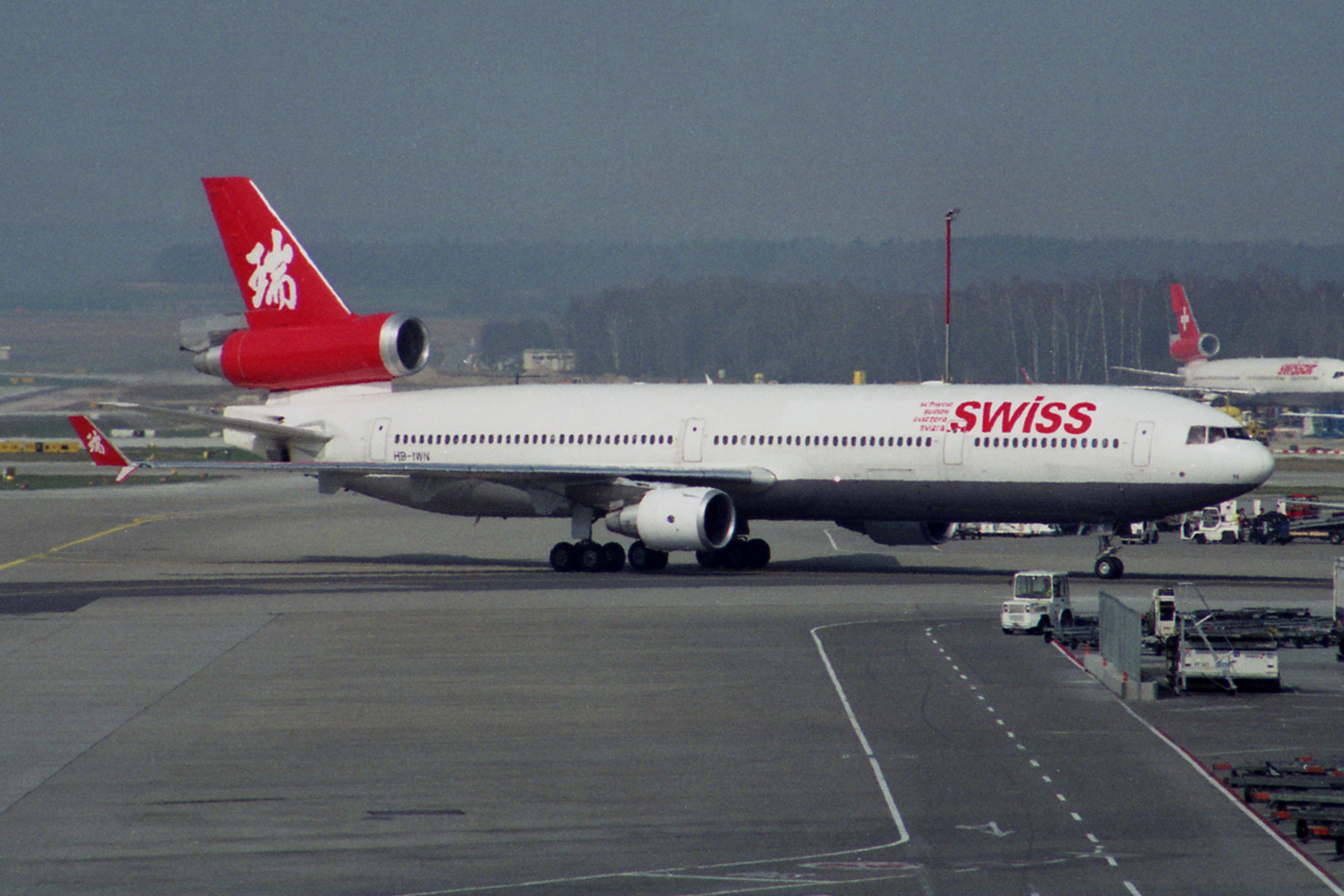
The same McDonnell Douglas MD-11 following the collapse of Swissair, retaining the Swissair Asia tail but with Swiss International Air Lines' logo

Swissair Asia operated the following aircraft:

Swissair Asia Fleet
Aircraft	In service	Orders	Passengers				Notes
Aircraft	In service	Orders	F	C	Y	Total	Notes
McDonnell Douglas MD-11	6	—	12	49	180	241	
Total	2	—					

== See also ==
- Australia Asia Airlines
- British Asia Airways
- Japan Asia Airways
- KLM Asia
- Air France Asie
