= Hotel President Wilson =

Building in Geneva, Switzerland

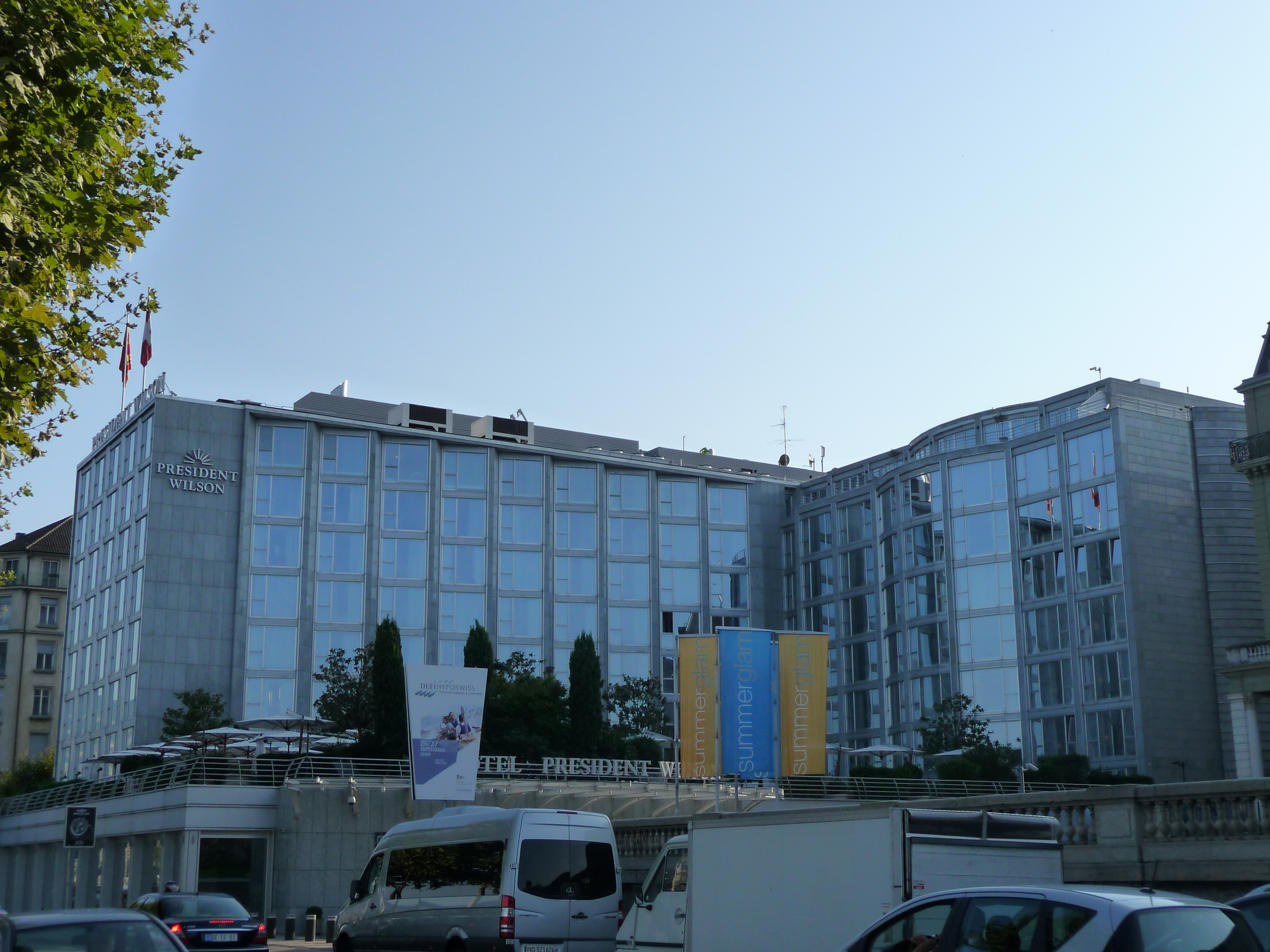
- Interactive map of the Hotel President Wilson area
- Hotel chain: The Luxury Collection

General information
- Location: Switzerland, Geneva
- Coordinates: 46.21415°N 6.151435°E
- Opening: 18 May 1962
- Owner: Charles Tamman

Design and construction
- Architect: Marcel Jacquignon

Website
- www.marriott.com/hotels/travel/gvalc-hotel-president-wilson-a-luxury-collection-hotel-geneva/

The Hotel President Wilson is located in Geneva, Switzerland, near the United Nations building on Lake Geneva.

== History ==
The hotel opened on May 18, 1962, as the Hotel President. In 1980, it was acquired by a joint venture between Swissair and Nestlé. In 1989, it was sold to the Tamman family. They invested 190 million CHF in its renovation and reopened it in 1996 as the Hotel President Wilson, named for the 28th president of the United States, Woodrow Wilson, in honor of his dedication to the creation of the League of Nations. On January 1, 2000, it became a member of The Luxury Collection. From 2007 to 2010, it was renovated again at a cost of 40 million CHF.

In November 2016, a Geneva hotel's computer equipment was infected by spy viruses, and sensitive talks among prominent leaders were recorded. This hotel was believed to be the Hotel President Wilson.

== Most expensive hotel suites in the world ==
The Royal Penthouse Suite at the Hotel President Wilson is believed to be the world's most expensive hotel suite, billed at CHF60,000 ($62,000 at mid-2017 rates) per night. The 12-bedroom suite takes up the entire eighth floor of the hotel, and has hosted heads of state from Bill Clinton to Mikhail Gorbachev. Guests can view the Swiss Alps from the suite.

In July 2017, the Hotel President Wilson ranked first in the list of most expensive suites of the world by the magazine Business Insider with its $80,000/night.

== Management ==
- Charles Tamman, owner and chairman
- Pablo Pizarro, hotel director
