= Swissair =

National airline of Switzerland (1931–2002)

Swissair Schweizerische Luftverkehr-AG S.A. Suisse pour la Navigation Aérienne

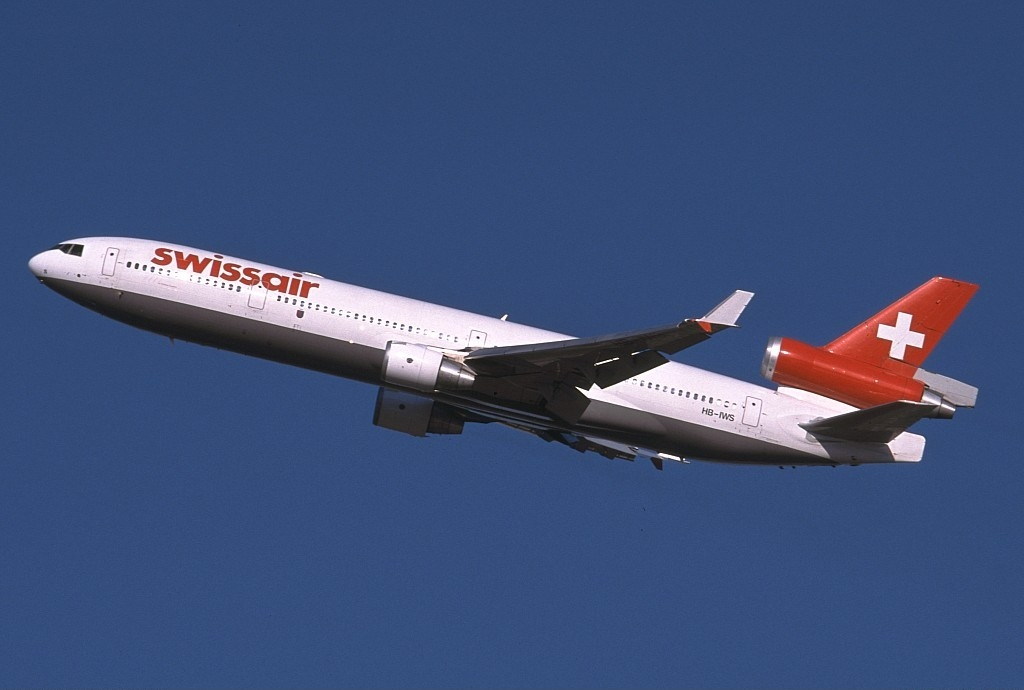
- Swissair MD-11 in 2001
IATA	ICAO	Call sign
SR	SWR	SWISSAIR
- Founded: 26 March 1931; 95 years ago
- Ceased operations: 31 March 2002; 24 years ago (assets transferred to Crossair, which later became Swiss International Air Lines)
- Hubs: Basel/Mulhouse; Geneva; Zurich
- Frequent-flyer program: Qualiflyer
- Alliance: The Qualiflyer Group
- Subsidiaries: Balair (1993–2001); Crossair (1978–2002); Swissair Asia (1995–2001)
- Parent company: Swissair Group (SAirGroup)
- Headquarters: Kloten, Canton of Zürich, Switzerland
- Key people: Mario Corti (CEO); Reto Francioni (Chairman)
- Website: swissair.com

Swissair (stylised in all lowercase) was the flag carrier of Switzerland between its founding in 1931 and bankruptcy in 2002.

Swissair was formed from a merger between Belair and Ad Astra Aero. For most of its 71 years, it was one of the major international airlines and known as the "Flying Bank" due to its financial stability, causing it to be regarded as a Swiss national symbol and icon. It was headquartered at Zurich Airport in Kloten.

In 1997, the Swissair Group was renamed SAirGroup (although it was again renamed Swissair Group in 2001), with four subdivisions: SAirLines (to which Swissair, regional subsidiary Crossair, leisure subsidiary Balair, and leasing subsidiary FlightLease belonged), SAirServices, SAirLogistics, and SAirRelations.

Due to its so-called "Hunter Strategy" of expanding its market by acquiring smaller airlines, Swissair was suffering from over-expansion by the late 1990s. The crash of Swissair Flight 111 in September 1998 killed all 229 people on board and generated a costly lawsuit and negative publicity for the airline. After the economic downturn following the September 11 attacks, Swissair's assets dramatically lost value, grounding the already-troubled airline in October 2001. The Swiss federal government later revived and sustained the airline until 31 March 2002. The final Swissair flight landed in Zurich from São Paulo on 1 April 2002.

On 1 April 2002, a former regional subsidiary, Crossair, renamed itself Swiss International Air Lines and took over most of Swissair's routes, planes, and staff. Swiss International Air Lines was taken over by the German airline Lufthansa in 2005. Swissair's holding company SAirGroup AG, completed its liquidation proceedings, which lasted over two decades, in 2024.

== History ==
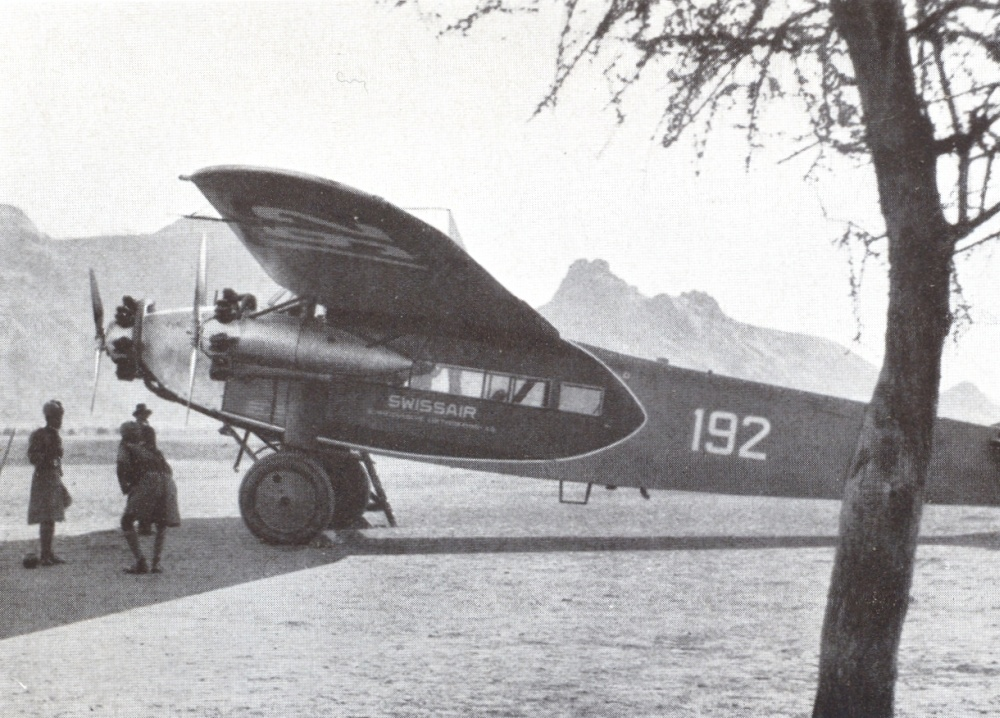
Swissair Fokker F.VIIb-3 m (CH-192) piloted by Walter Mittelholzer in Kassala (Sudan), February 1934

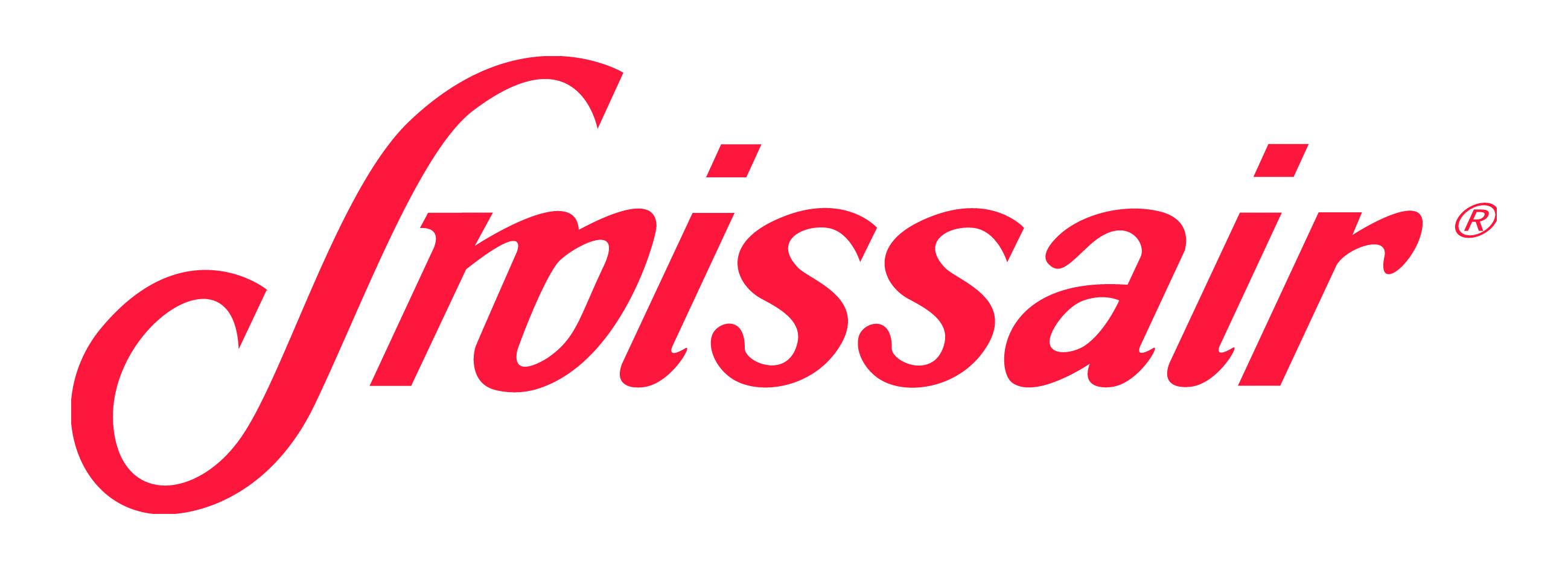
The first Swissair logo

=== Founding years ===
On 26 March 1931, Swissair – Schweizerische Luftverkehr AG (English: Swissair – Swiss Air Transport) was founded through the fusion of the airlines Ad Astra Aero (founded in 1919) and Balair (1925). Balz Zimmermann and the Swiss aviation pioneer Walter Mittelholzer were the founding fathers. In contrast to other airlines, it did not receive support from the government, which allowed it to operate independently and focus on building a strong brand identity without relying on state funding. The name "Swissair" was the proposal of Dr Alphonse Ehinger, president of the board of directors of Balair, although "Swissair" was first deemed "un-Swiss". In the first operational year, 64 people were employed, including ten pilots, seven radio operators, and eight mechanics. Their planes offered 85 seats, and operation was maintained only from March to October. The route network had a length of 4,203 kilometres (2,612 mi).

On 17 April 1932, Swissair bought two Lockheed Orions, making them the second European airline to use American planes after the Czechoslovak operator CSA purchased a Ford Trimotor in 1930. The Orion was the fastest commercial aeroplane of its time and was put to use on the "Express Line", Zürich-Munich-Vienna. This led Lufthansa to ask Heinkel for a model that could top Orion's speed, leading to the Heinkel He 70. The first trans-Alpine route was introduced in 1933: Zürich-Milan.

For the first time in Europe, flight attendants were employed aboard the Curtiss Condor beginning in 1934. Nelly Diener, the first female flight attendant in Europe, became world-famous. She was killed after just 79 flights in a crash near Wurmlingen, Germany, on 27 July 1934. The cause of the crash was determined to be material fatigue.

In 1936, Douglas DC-2s were acquired, and London was added to the route network. In 1937, the bigger Douglas DC-3 was bought. In the same year, both founding fathers died: Walter Mittelholzer died while mountaineering in Steiermark, Austria, and Balz Zimmermann succumbed to an infectious disease.

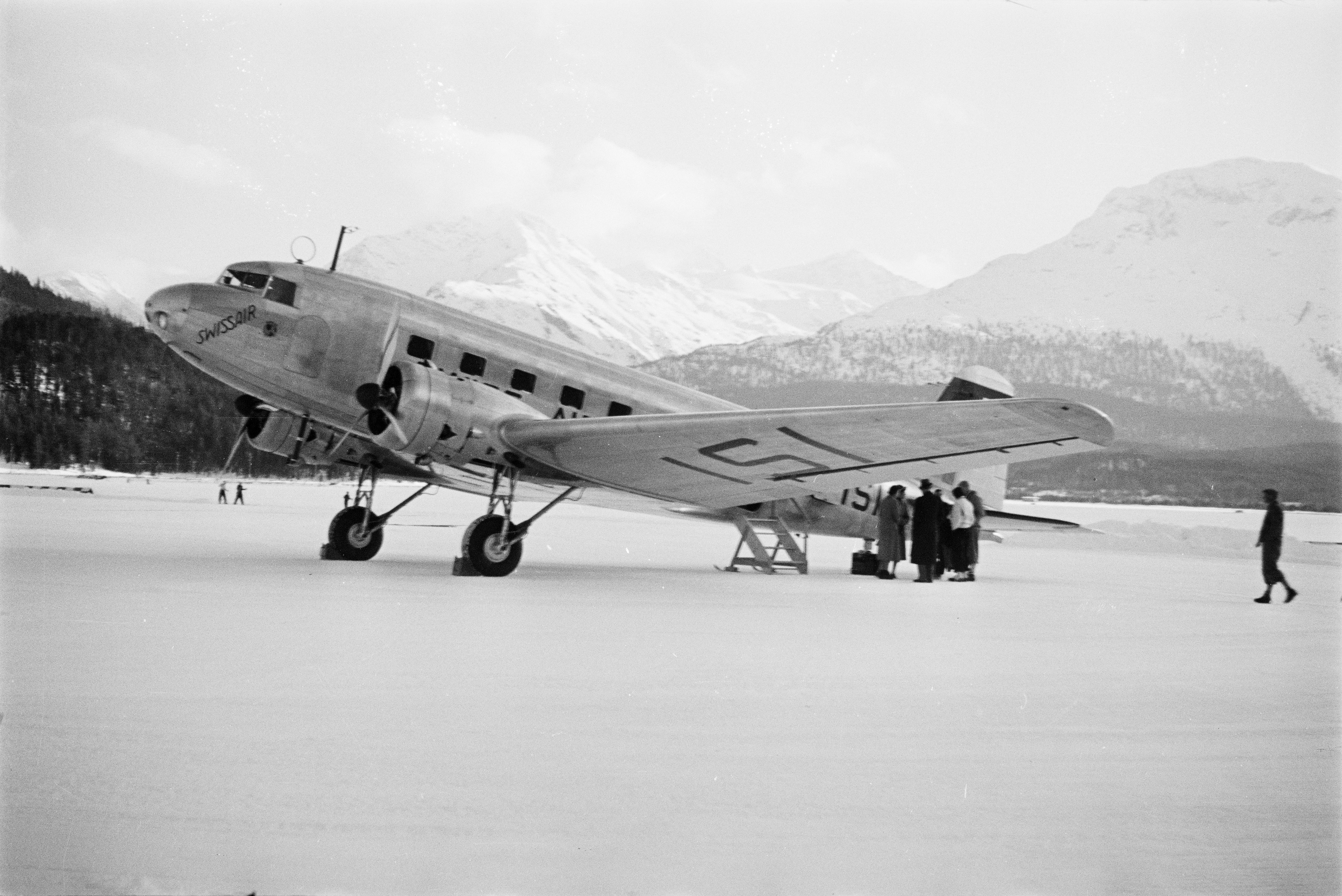
A Swissair DC-2. Swissair would become a very loyal customer of Douglas, buying most of their commercial aircraft models.

On 27 August 1939, days before World War II broke out, the airspace over Germany and France was closed. Swissair was forced to suspend service to Amsterdam, Paris, and London. Two days later, the Swissair service was closed completely. Of 180 employees, 131 had to serve in the army. Despite the war, some routes were later reintroduced, such as Munich, Berlin, Rome, and Barcelona. In 1940, an invasion of Switzerland was feared, and Swissair moved their operations to the Magadino Plains in Ticino. Operations were suspended in August 1944, when a Swissair DC-2 was destroyed in Stuttgart during an American bombing raid.

On 30 July 1945, Swissair was able to resume commercial aviation.

=== Ascension ===
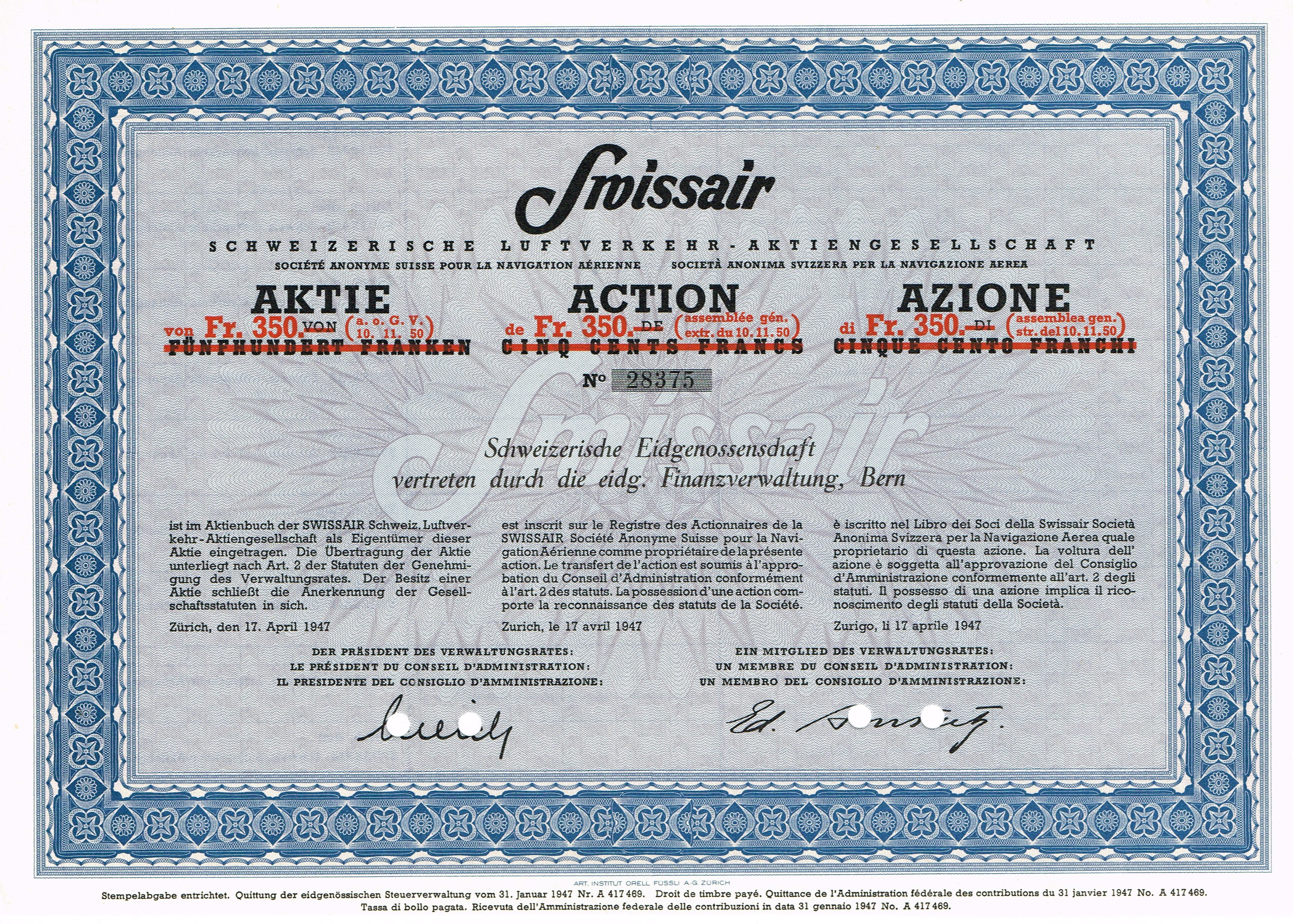
Swissair share, issued 17 April 1947

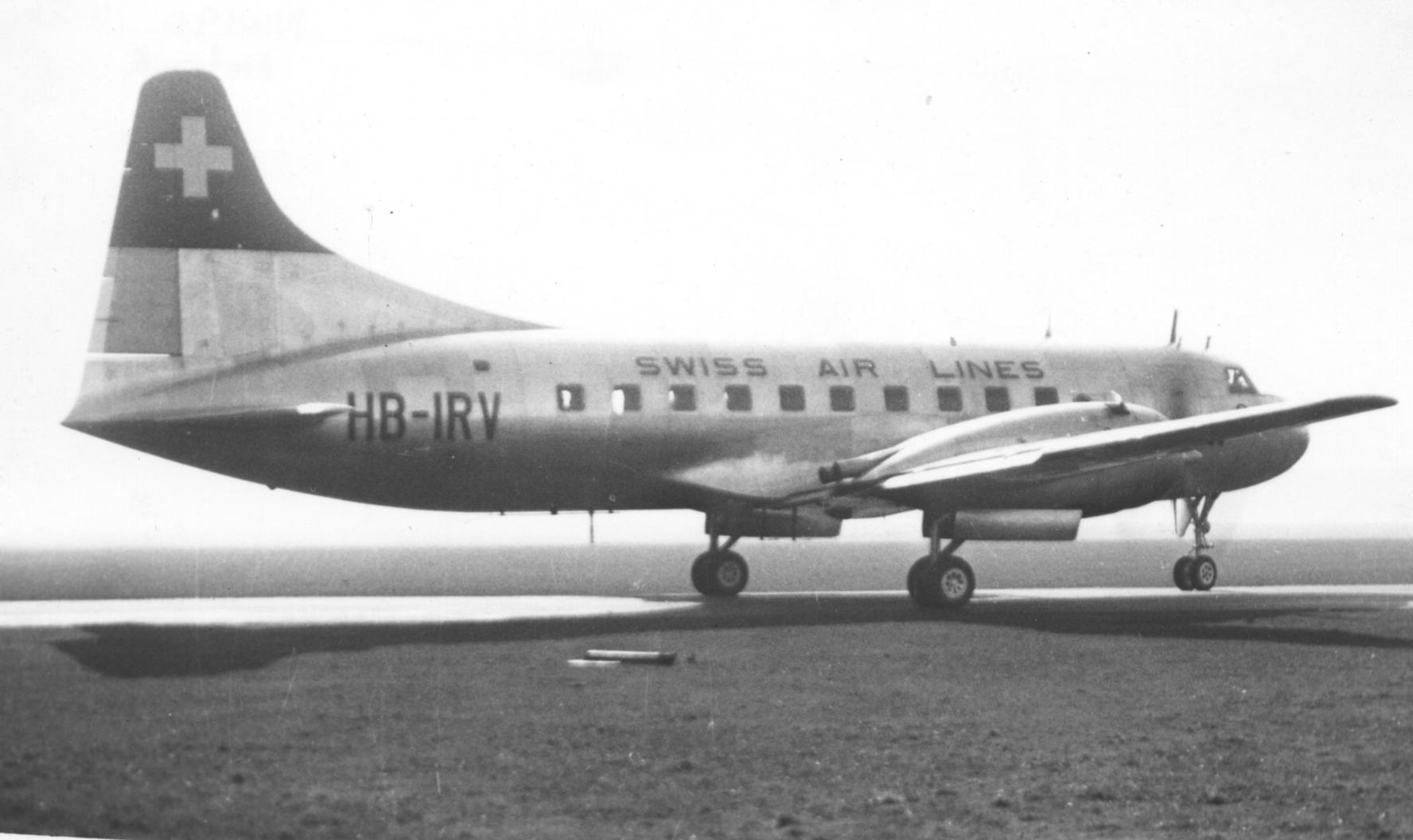
A Swiss Air Lines Convair 240 at Manchester Airport, England, in March 1950

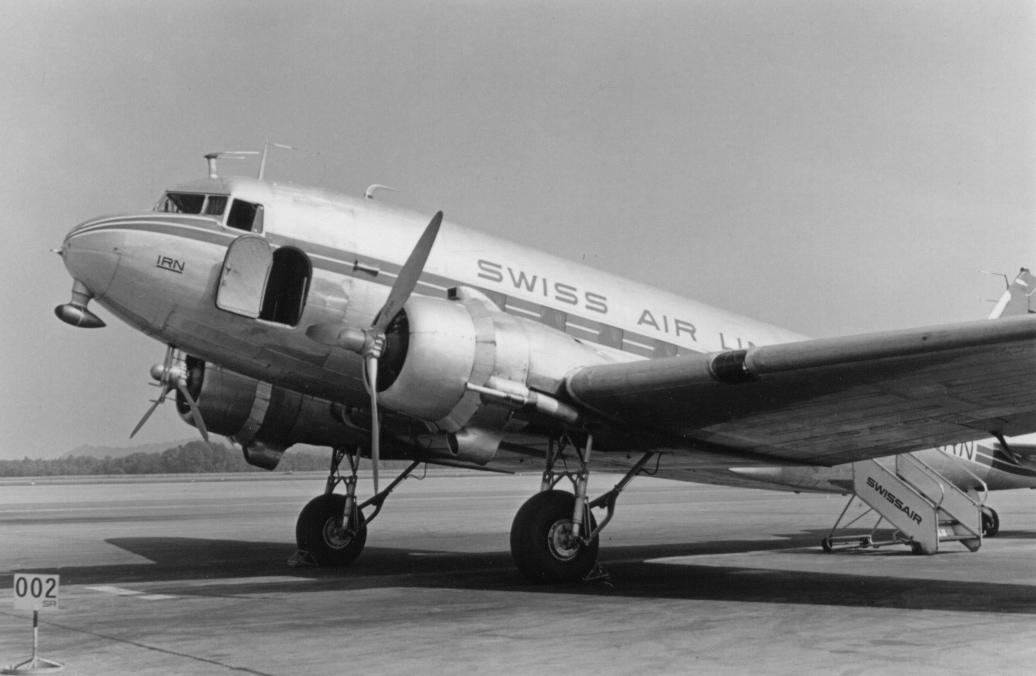
A Swissair Douglas DC-3 in the 1950s

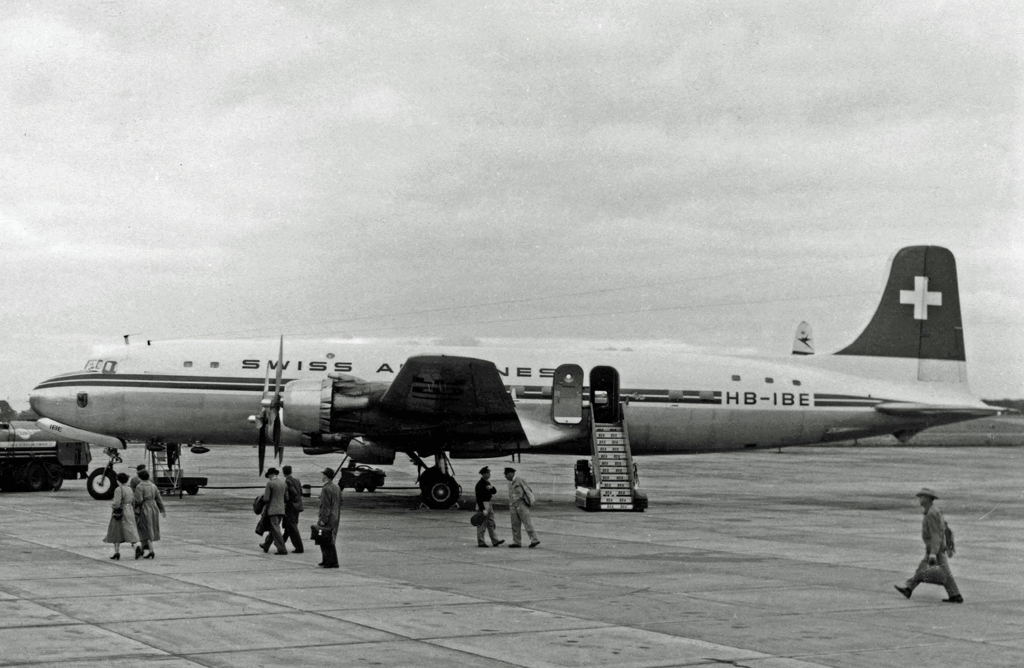
A Douglas DC-6B at Manchester Airport in 1954

In 1947, the rise of shareholder capital to SFr20 million (equivalent to SFr95.61 million or US$105.06 million in 2021) enabled long-haul flights to New York, South Africa, and South America with Douglas DC-4s. The modern Convair 240, the first Swissair plane with a pressurised cabin, was used for short- and medium-range flights starting in late 1948. The first Swissair DC-4 flight to New York was routed via Shannon, Ireland, and Stephenville, Newfoundland, on 2 May 1947. However, it ended in Washington, D.C., due to fog at New York's LaGuardia Airport. The total elapsed time was 20 hours and 55 minutes.

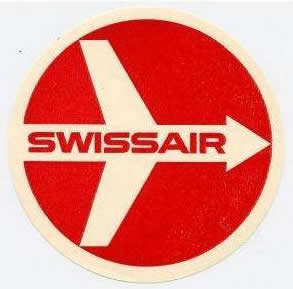
The former Swissair logo

The public, including the federal government, cantons, municipalities, the Swiss Federal Railways, and the Swiss postal services, took over 30.6% of the shares and enabled Swissair to get a credit of 15 million Swiss francs to purchase the airline's first two Douglas DC-6B airliners for delivery in 1951. By that act, Swissair became Switzerland's national flag carrier. The new pressurised aircraft was to replace the DC-4 on transatlantic routes.

In 1948, the airport in Dübendorf, which had served as the base of Swissair, was relocated to Zürich-Kloten. Military aviation continued in Dübendorf. The next year, Swissair plunged into a financial crisis due to a sudden devaluation of the British pound because fares, except for traffic to the United States, were calculated in British currency. At that time, traffic to England made up 40 per cent of Swissair's revenue.

In June 1950, Walter Berchtold, manager of Swiss Federal Railways, was elected to the directorial board of Swissair and served as its director. In 1971, he created the corporate culture of Swissair. He grasped the importance of corporate image and corporate identity, and after the example of BOAC's "Speedbird", he introduced the arrow-shaped Swissair logo. Giving flight personnel a distinct uniform was also an important move. At the time, flight attendants' uniforms resembled the grey-blue ones of the Swiss Women's Army Corps, so Berchtold introduced ones in a modish marine blue. Swissair initiated a veritable fashion competition among European airlines.

Revenue passenger-kilometers, scheduled flights only, in millions
Year	Traffic
1950	147
1955	465
1960	1138
1965	2436
1971	5001
1975	7562
1980	10831
1985	12609
2000	34246

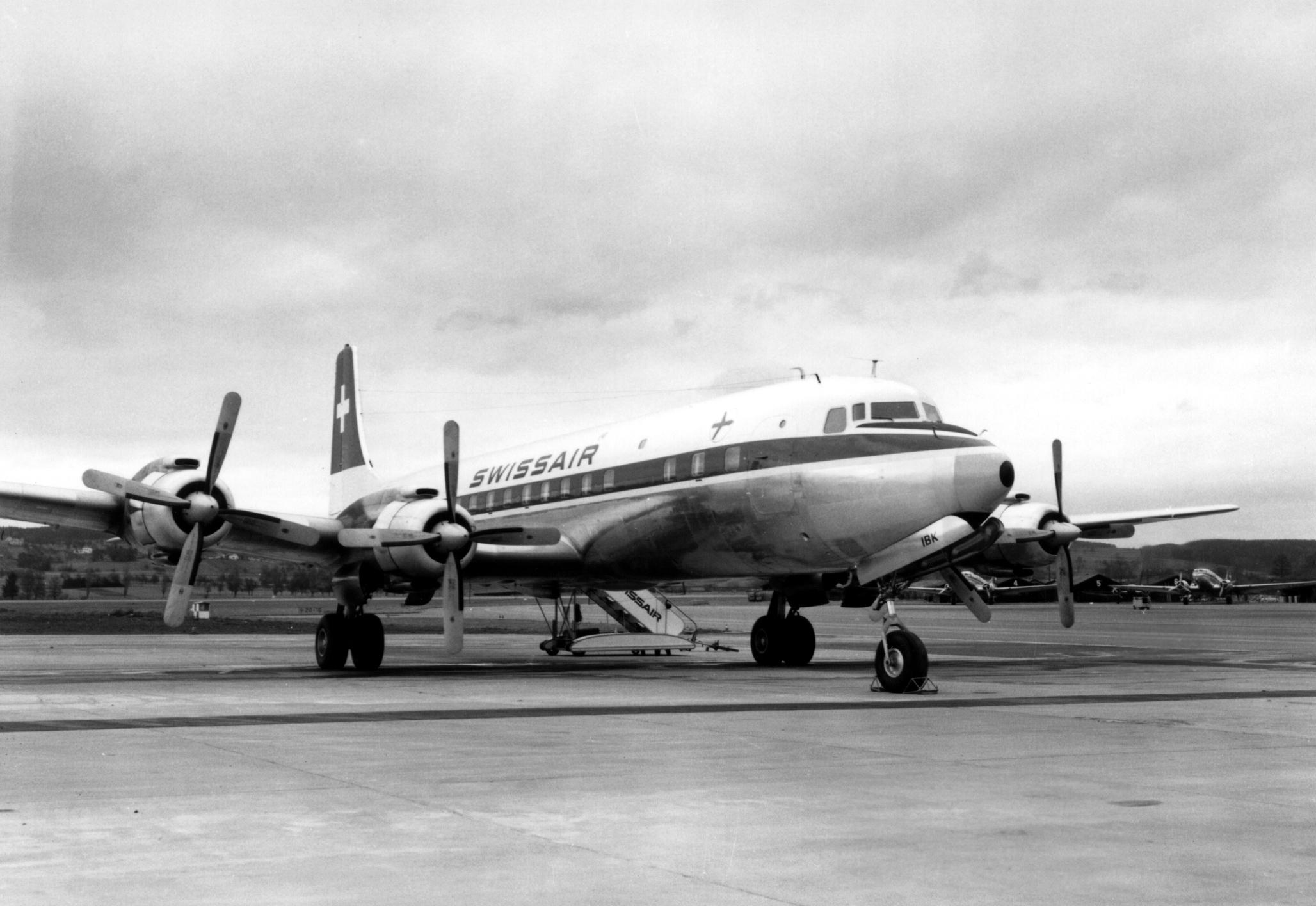
Douglas DC-7C (1957)

In 1952, the cabin layout on northern transatlantic routes was changed to one with a first and a tourist (economy) class. The first-class cabin had comfortable chairs on which one could sleep, given the name "Slumberettes". Those sleeping chairs were soon succeeded by beds, modelled after the US Pullman railway cars. Two adjacent seats were moved towards each other and formed a lower berth. The wall panel could be folded downward, forming the upper berth in which the other person could sleep. A year later, a tourist-class cabin was introduced on intra-European flights.

In 1953, Swissair, with the city of Basel, founded a charter company called Balair, reusing the name of one of its predecessors, a company that initially used older Swissair aircraft to fly to holiday destinations.

As the first European customer, Swissair bought the Douglas DC-7C, which enabled the company to provide non-stop flights to the United States. For shorter-range routes, the Convair Metropolitan was used.

In 1957, the Far East was added to the route network. Direct flights to Tokyo had intermediate stops in Athens, Karachi, Bombay, Bangkok and Manila. That same year, Swissair partnered with Aristotle Onassis to form the new Greek airline, Olympic Airways.

While competitors first looked at turboprop aeroplanes to replace their piston-engined craft, Swissair introduced jet aeroplanes. Together with SAS, Swissair bought Douglas DC-8s, which were delivered beginning in 1960. For medium- and short-range routes, the Sud Aviation Caravelle was purchased. The aircraft were maintained in concert with SAS, and manuals for operation and maintenance were co-written.

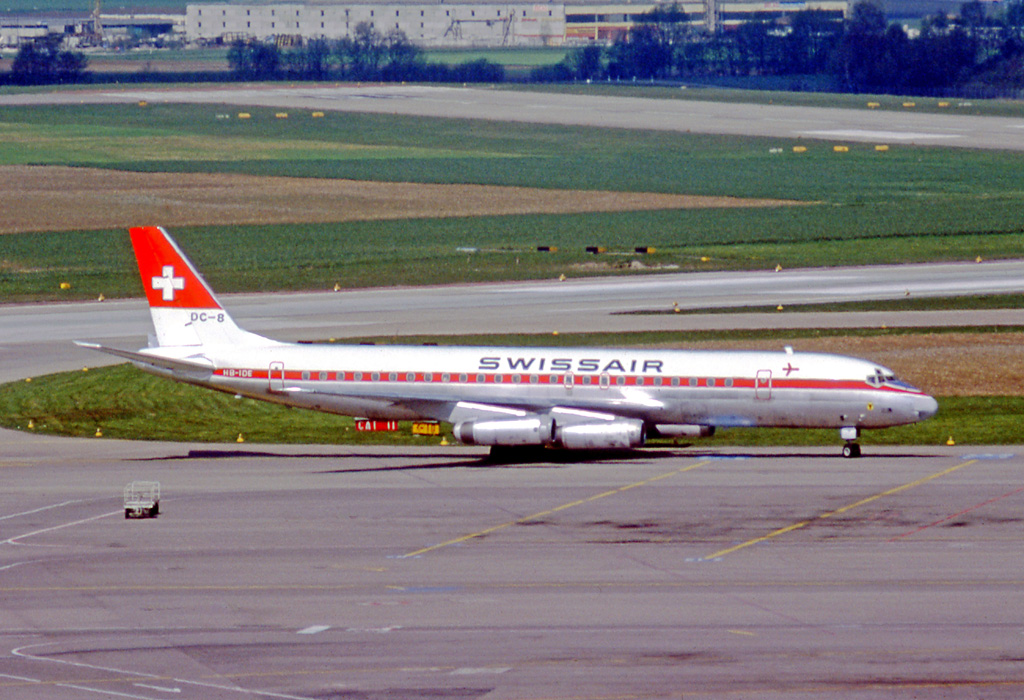
Douglas DC-8-62 of Swissair at Zurich Airport in 1979. The DC-8 series served the airline from 1960.

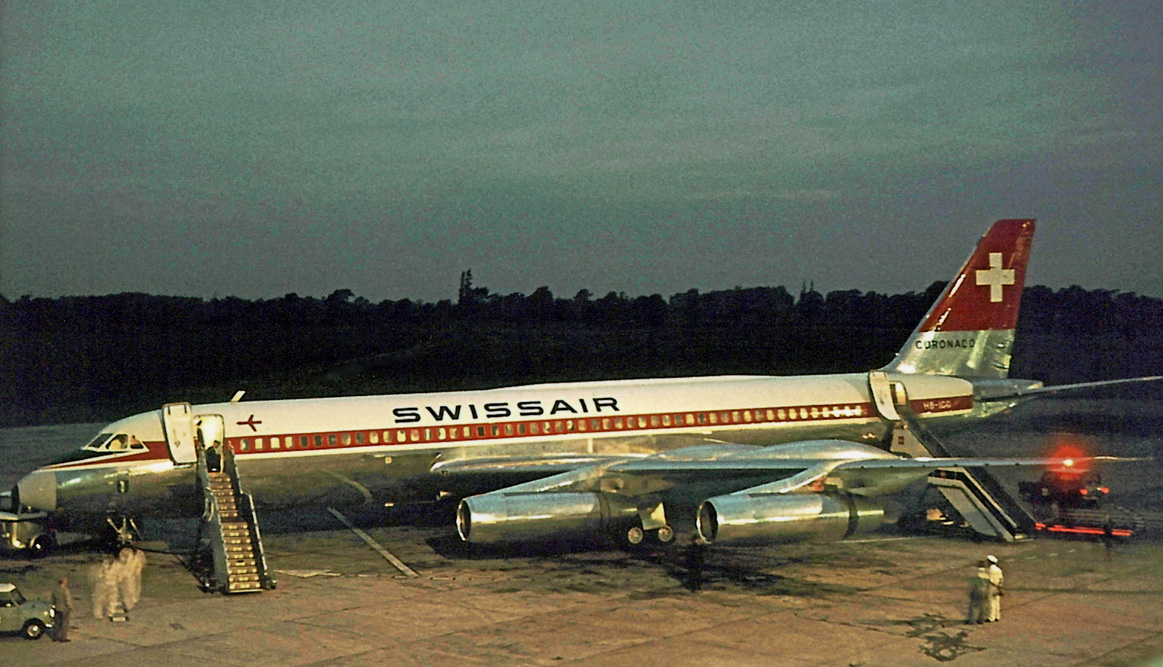
Swissair Convair Coronado 990A (1962–1975)

Swissair was one of the few companies to order the Convair 990 Coronado for its medium- and long-range routes. Although the aircraft did not initially fulfil contractual specifications, they were liked by employees and customers. They operated on the airline's routes to South America, West Africa, and the Middle and Far East.

1966 saw the introduction of the Douglas DC-9. That aircraft became the backbone of the short- and medium-range routes and, after convincing Douglas, soon merged with McDonnell Aircraft to create McDonnell Douglas and ultimately merged with Boeing, offering a stretched variant: the DC-9-32. For the first time, Swissair was the launch customer of an aircraft type.

Armin Baltensweiler led the company for more than 20 years after taking over as president of the directorial board in 1971. In the same year, the first Boeing 747-200 jumbo jet was acquired, and in the next year, the first McDonnell Douglas DC-10-30 followed. Both types shaped the long-haul fleet until the 1990s. Again, the specifications of both aircraft were developed in collaboration with SAS. Also in 1972, Switzerland introduced a prohibition of night flights, which led to the cessation of cheaper night fares.

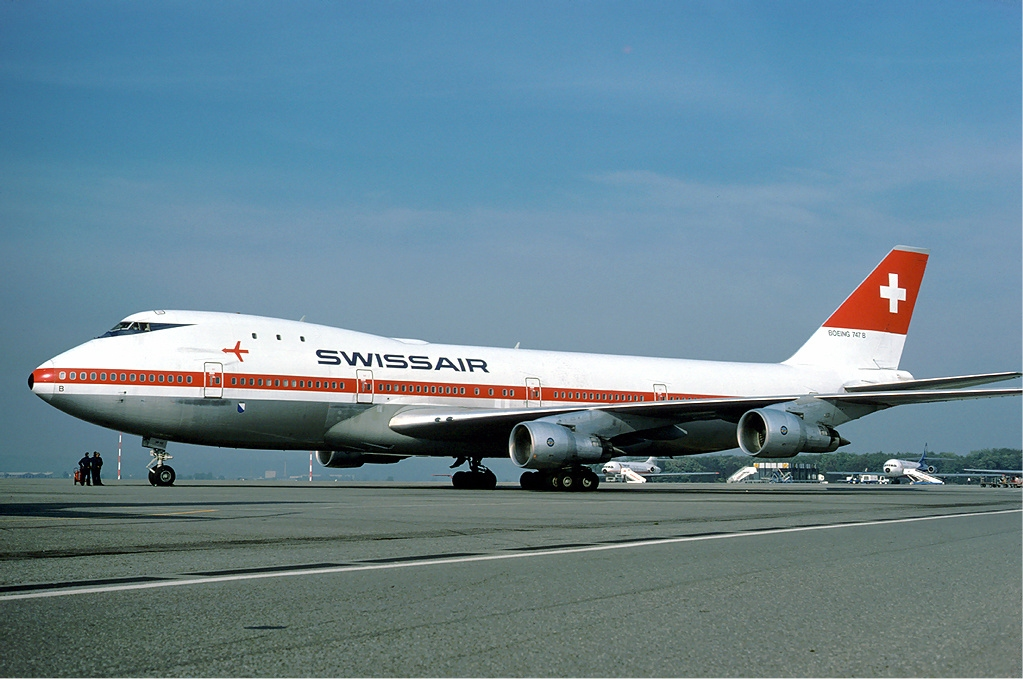
Swissair Boeing 747-200B (1971)

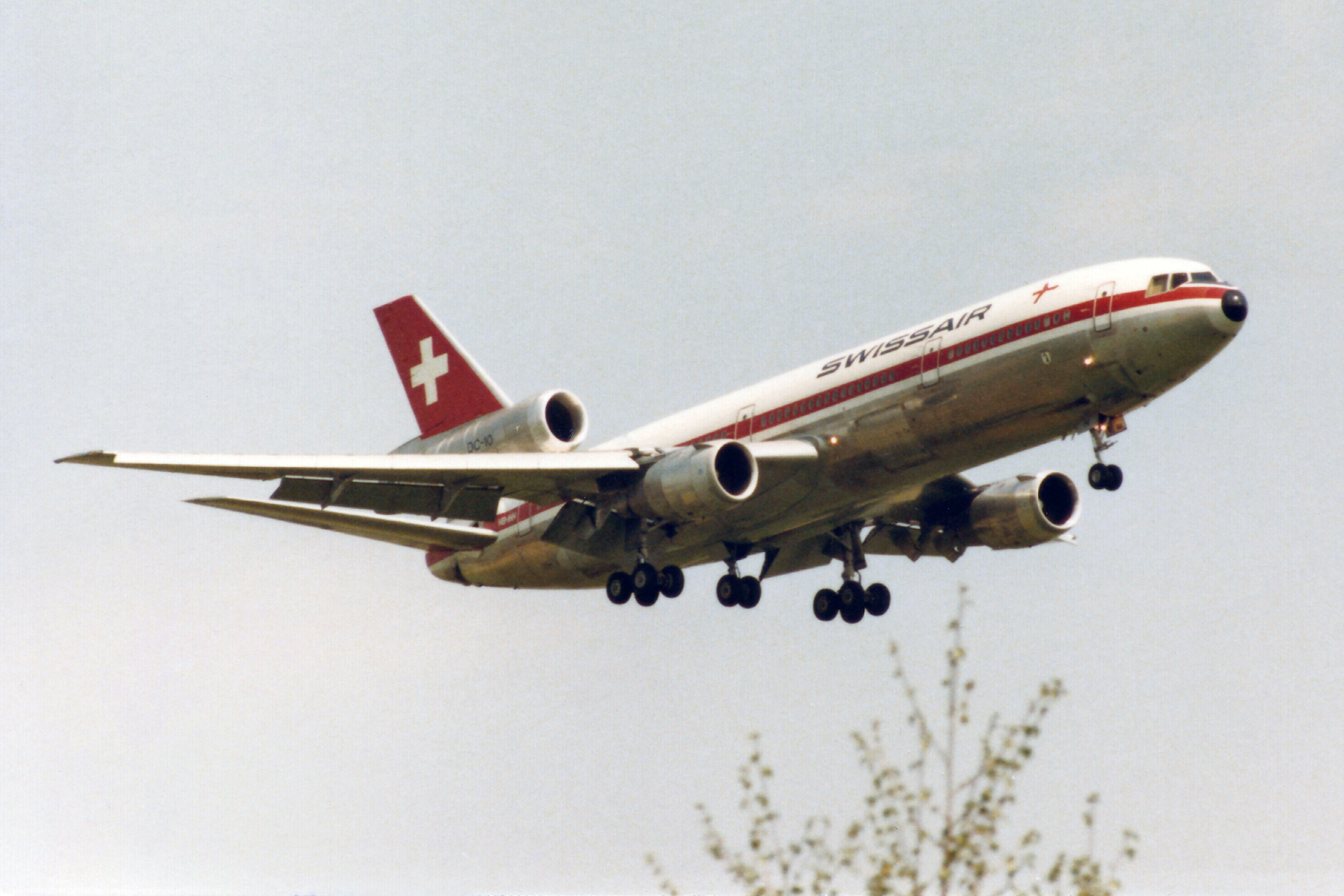
Swissair McDonnell Douglas DC-10 (1972)

In 1973, the company struggled with severe turbulence: a currency crisis, collective chaos, an air traffic controllers' strike, the October War, and the first oil crisis were weathered without significant damage. In the same year, the regional representative of Swissair in Buenos Aires was kidnapped by the Montoneros. After 38 days in captivity, he was released after the payment of SFr12.35 million (equivalent to SFr29.69 million or US$32.63 million in 2021). The airline also phased out the CV-990s, which were a type of aircraft known for their distinctive design and performance, during that time.

Swissair was the second European airline to offer service to the People's Republic of China, introducing service to Beijing and Shanghai in 1975. In the same year, Swissair was the launch customer for the DC-9-51. In 1977, Swissair was the launch customer for the third DC-9 type, the DC-9-81 variant, now called the MD-80. Armin Baltensweiler had travelled to a meeting of the McDonnell-Douglas board of directors in St. Louis to convince them to further stretch the fuselage of the DC-9-51. Baltensweiler was called the "Father of the MD-80". In 1979, Swissair was the first company to order the Airbus A310 and the jumbo jet variant with a stretched upper deck, the Boeing 747-300. Later on, the Fokker 100 short-range aircraft and the three-engined MD-11 were aircraft for which Swissair was the launch customer. 1983 saw the replacement of the older DC-9s with MD-83s.

Since the 1960s, Swissair has been a world leader in the development of cargo reservation systems (CRS). PARS and CARIDO were examples of systems enabling the booking of passenger seats and freight space.

=== "The flying bank" ===
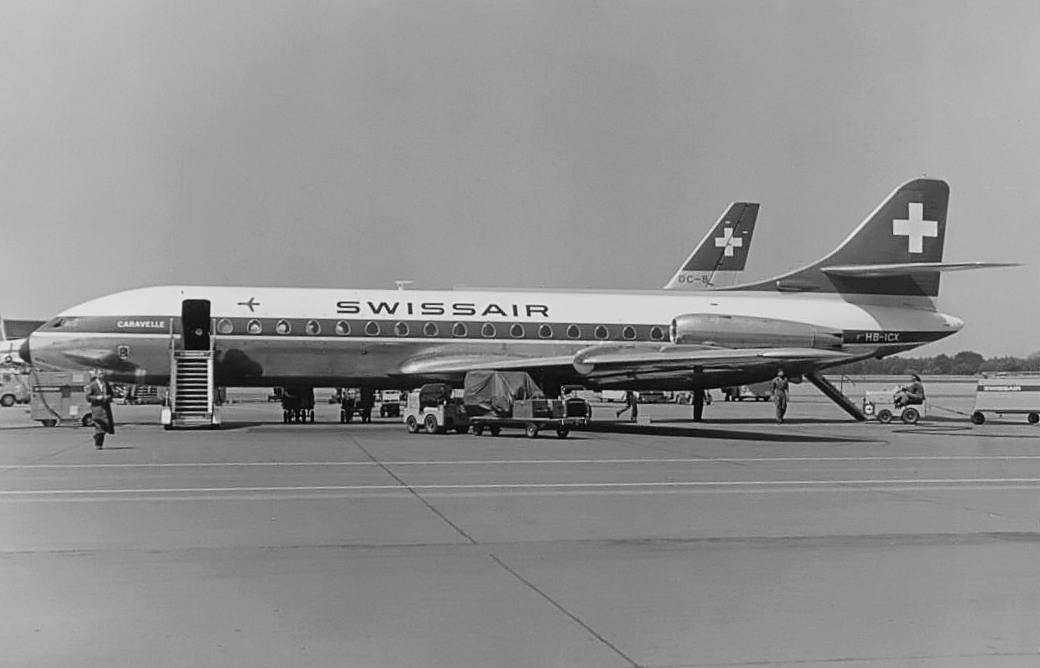
Sud Aviation Caravelle (1961)

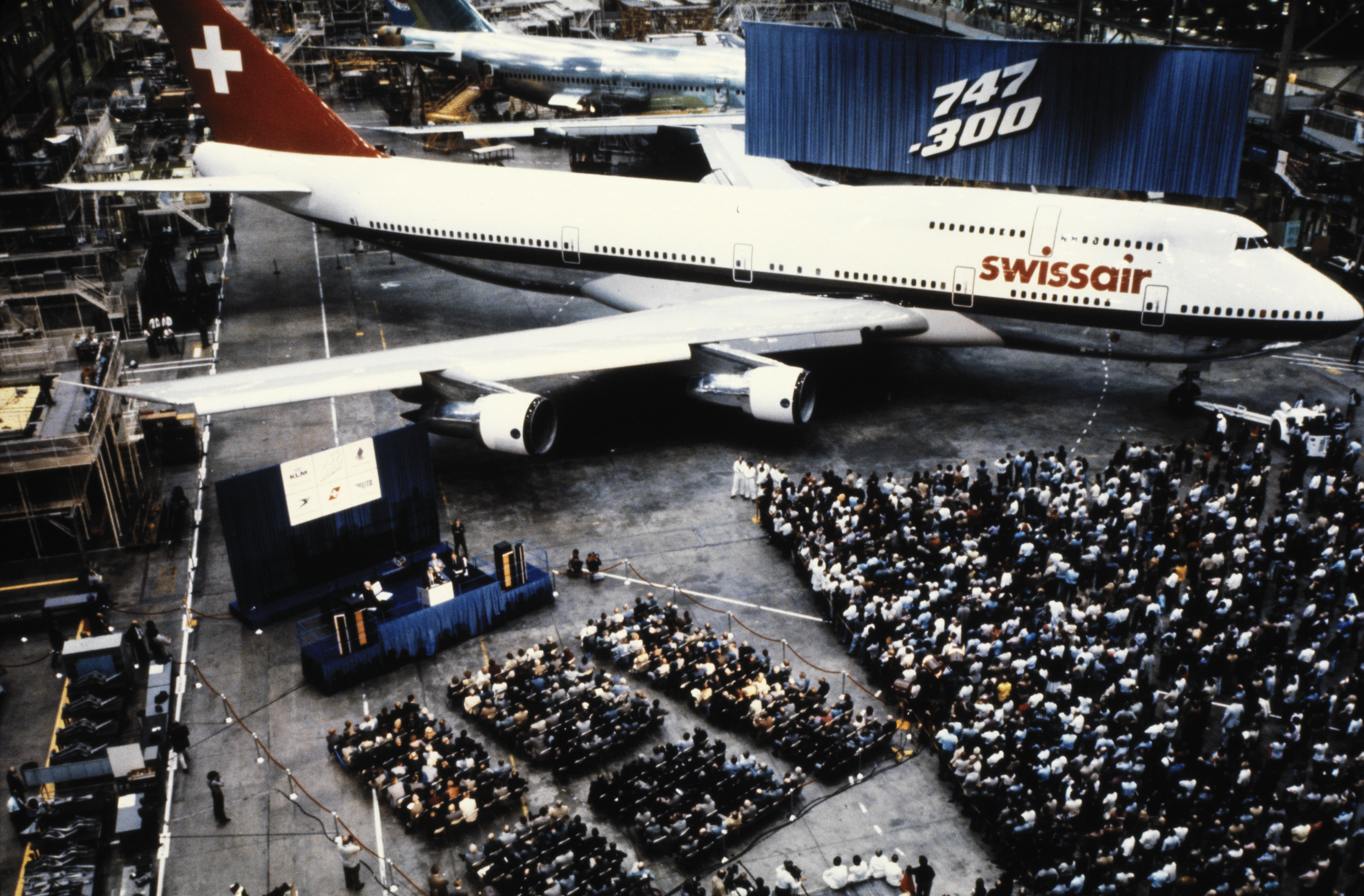
Presentation of the first 747-300M at Boeing's Everett factory in January 1983. Swissair was the launch customer of the 747-300, the first 747 variant with a stretched upper deck.

After the 1960s, air traffic increased quickly and allowed many airlines—many of which were quasi-monopolists on their routes—to yield high revenues. In geographic terms, the central position of Switzerland in Europe helped it generate revenue from transfer passengers. By the early 1970s, Swissair had become known as "the flying bank", appealing to its large deposits and huge liquidity. In geographic terms, the central position of Switzerland in Europe helped it generate revenue from transfer passengers. By the early 1970s, Swissair was becoming known as "the flying bank" due to its large hidden assets and significant liquidity. Second, "flying bank" was the designation for a corporate group that cared more about financial management than about flying aeroplanes.

At the beginning of deregulation and liberalisation of the airline industry in the United States in the late 1970s, airlines felt increased financial pressure. In 1978, Moritz Suter founded a regional airline named Crossair, which put Swissair under additional stress. To counter these changes, Swissair invested their large financial reserves into takeovers and into flight-related trades like baggage handling, catering, aircraft maintenance, and duty-free stores. This strategy diversified economic risks at the expense of the core business of Swissair: commercial aviation.

As a result of a 12-day global flight ban on the DC-10, imposed by the US Federal Aviation Administration after the crash of American Airlines Flight 191 on 25 May 1979, a significant portion of Swissair's long-haul fleet remained grounded. On October 7, after landing in Athens, a DC-8 overran the runway and caught fire, killing 14 passengers. By the end of that year, kerosene prices had doubled, and fuel costs had increased from 12% to 16% of total costs. Swissair was the first to order the Airbus A310, designed with a two-man cockpit for more traffic-tight short distances and shorter medium distances, and accepted options for 10 more units. Another Boeing 747 was ordered. Dublin was added to the route network as a new destination, but service to Beirut had to be discontinued in mid-July due to the political turmoil in Lebanon.

Swissair was able to outperform the competition in a year that experts deemed to be the worst in the history of civil aviation, largely due to its strategic decisions and maintaining a strong brand reputation despite the difficulties faced by the industry, such as economic downturns and increased operational costs. Swissair maintained its proven cabin division into first and economy classes, unlike other airlines that began to offer a second-tier executive class. The short-haul fleet was renewed with the MD-81 (DC-9-81) introduction into service in 1980. This type of aircraft partially replaced the older and smaller DC-9. In addition, modern, fuel-saving aircraft, such as five new Boeing 747s with extended upper decks and two DC-10-30s with a longer range, were ordered. With the connection of Zurich Airport to the national railway network, bus delivery services from Zürich were discontinued. Air passengers were already able to check their luggage at the rail station. The route network was expanded with service to Jakarta, but flights to Tehran and Baghdad had to be suspended after the outbreak of the Iran-Iraq War. By the end of 1980, Swissair was represented in 196 cities. New offices or points of sale were opened in Luxembourg, Ulm, Ottawa, Raleigh, Westchester, Valparaíso, Jubail, Sanaa, and Salisbury/Harare. Under the name Swissôtel, the hotels Président in Geneva, International in Zürich, Drake in New York, and Bellevue Palace in Bern were administratively combined.

=== Concentration ===
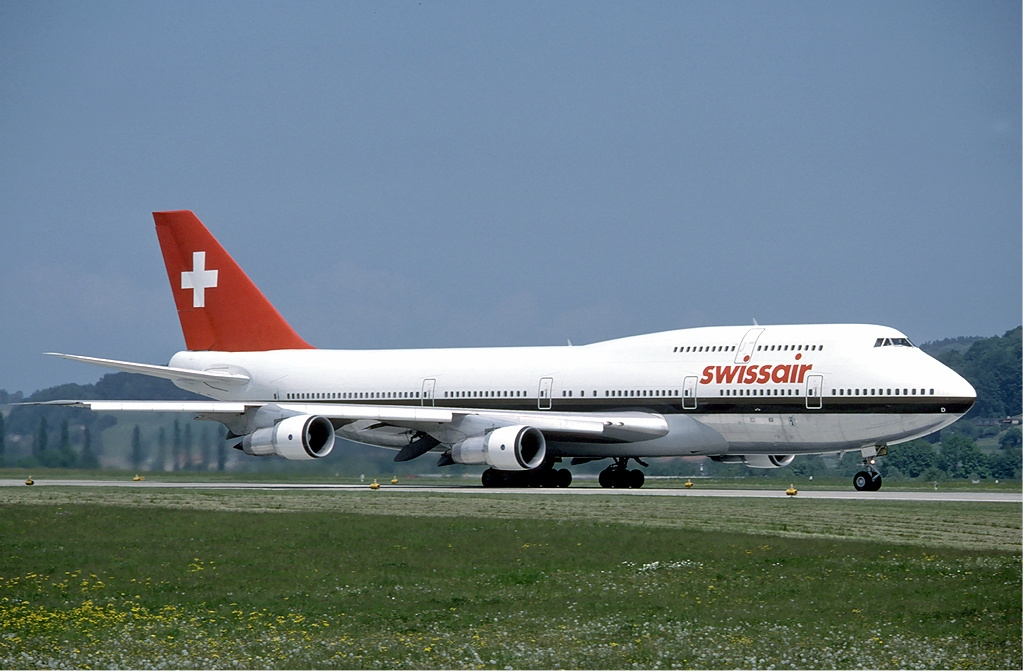
Boeing 747-300 (1985)

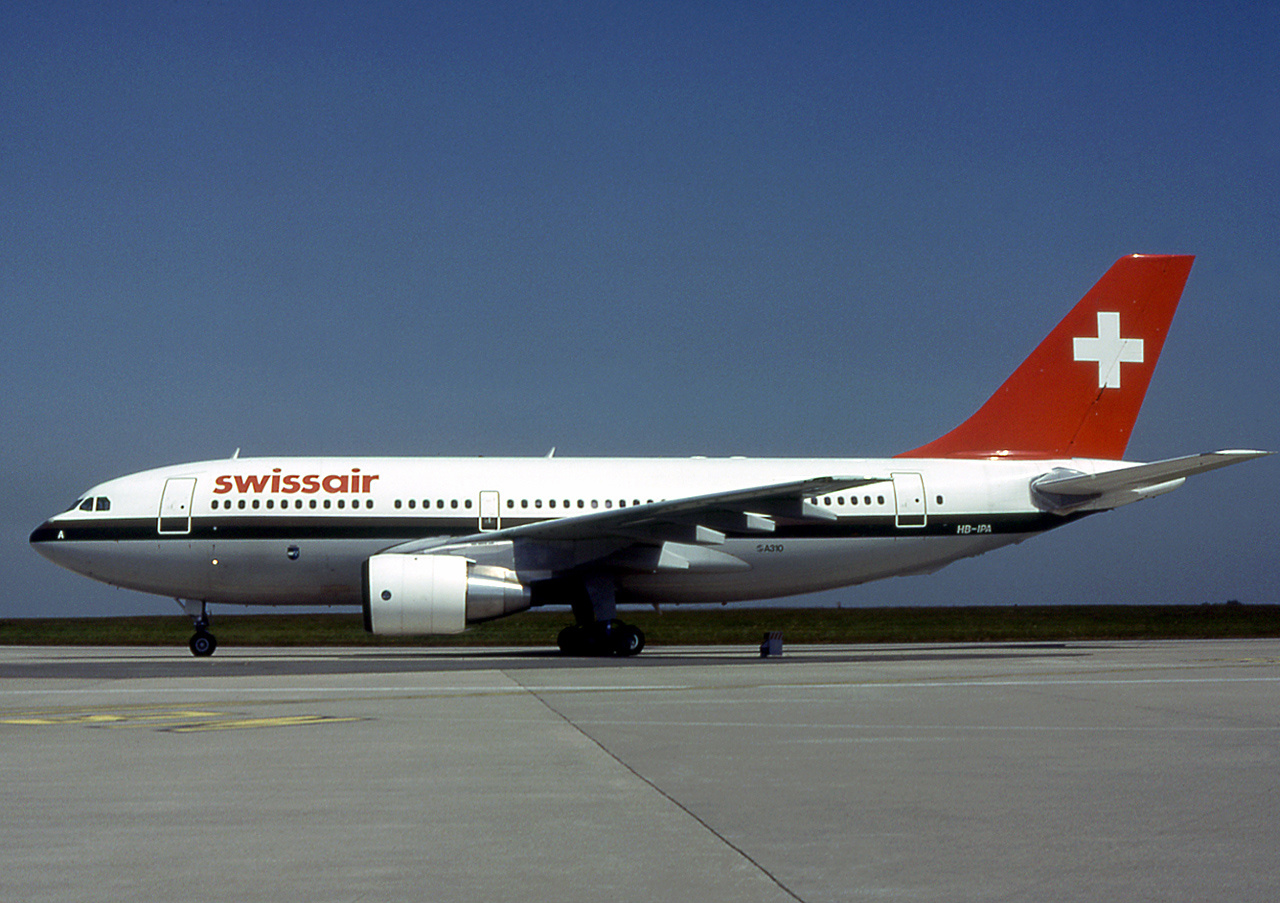
Airbus A310-200 (1983)

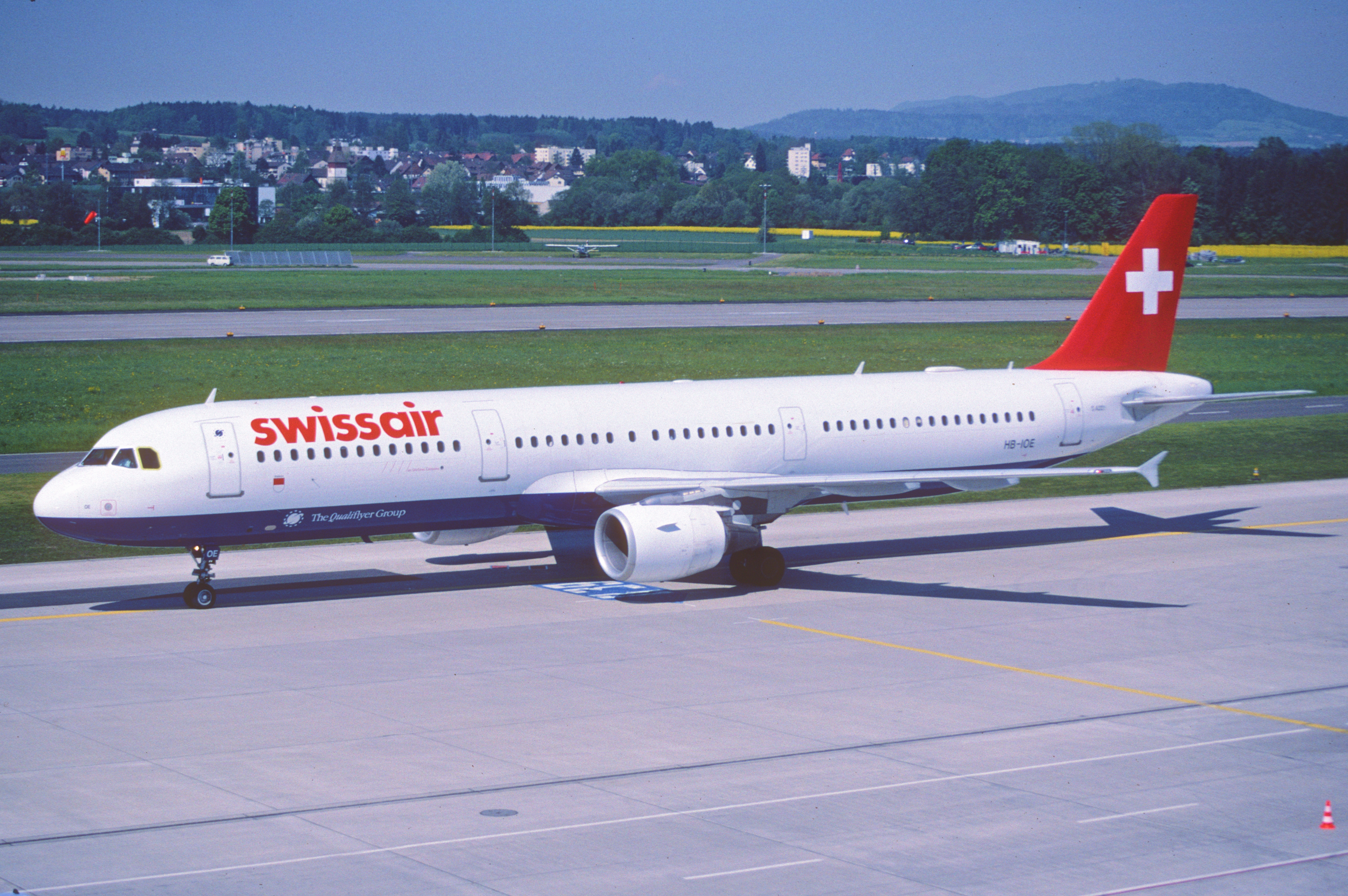
Airbus A321-100 (2001)

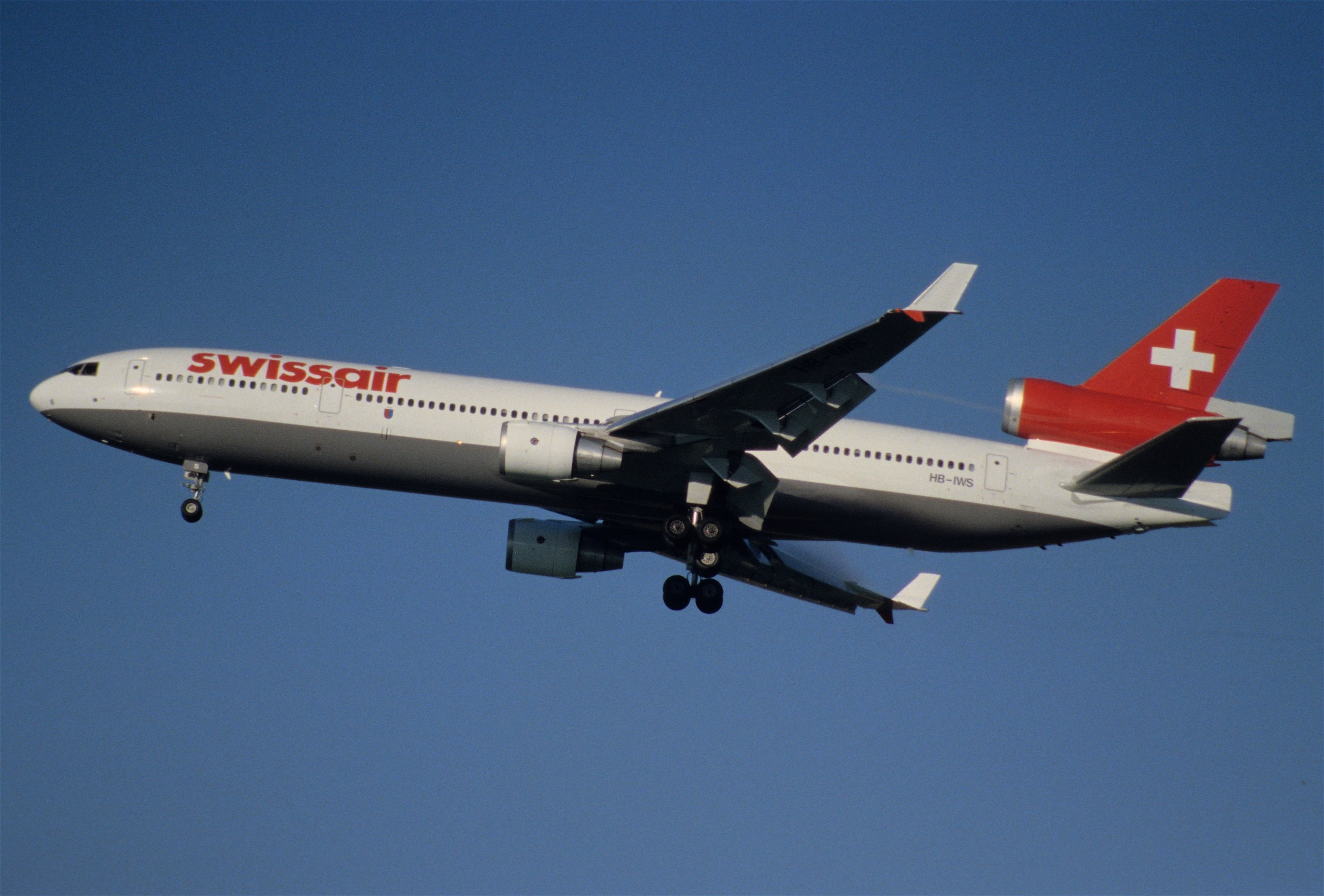
McDonnell Douglas MD-11 (2000)

Regarding further liberalising Europe's airline market, Swissair focused more on commercial aviation and extended its partnerships. As the first European airline to do so, Swissair signed a cooperation treaty with Delta Air Lines and Singapore Airlines in 1989 to create the "Global Excellence" alliance. In 1990, together with SAS, Austrian Airlines and Finnair, the "European Quality Alliance" was founded. The last alliance was later renamed "The Qualiflyer Group".

Many airlines lost money in 1990 and 1991 due to the weak economy, the Gulf War and its aftermath, and rising operational costs. The ongoing liberalisation of industry has also made competition stronger. As a result, Swissair lost 99 million Swiss francs in the first half of the year and couldn't pay dividends to its shareholders. Swissair had to use its savings to cover big losses in the commercial aviation sector in 1991 and 1992.

On January 1, 1991, commercial aviation in Europe was completely liberalised, and existing capacities led to aggressive competition among airlines. In a national referendum held on 6 December 1992, Swiss citizens voted against joining the European Economic Area (EEA). This referendum was a significant disservice to Swissair, an airline with a tiny domestic market: its planes were not allowed to take up passengers during intermediate landings in EEA countries (e.g., Zürich-Frankfurt-New York), and Swissair was not allowed to offer tickets for sections that fully lie in EEA member countries (e.g., Zürich-Frankfurt-Paris).

See also freedoms of the air.

Like other airlines based in smaller countries, Swissair was now under significant pressure to compete effectively in the global market, particularly as larger airlines formed alliances to enhance their reach and influence. More and more national airlines have affiliated themselves with airline alliances to maintain a worldwide market presence. But to be appealing to American alliance partners, an airline must have a critical size in terms of passenger numbers. To meet that goal, in 1993, an alliance between Swissair, KLM, SAS, and Austrian Airlines was proposed. This project bore the name "Alcazar" (after the Spanish castle) to create a single Central European airline. However, in various countries, this project has been criticised. In Switzerland itself, it was thought that the huge financial assets were too precious to sacrifice to merge Swissair with the other airlines.

=== Hunter Strategy ===
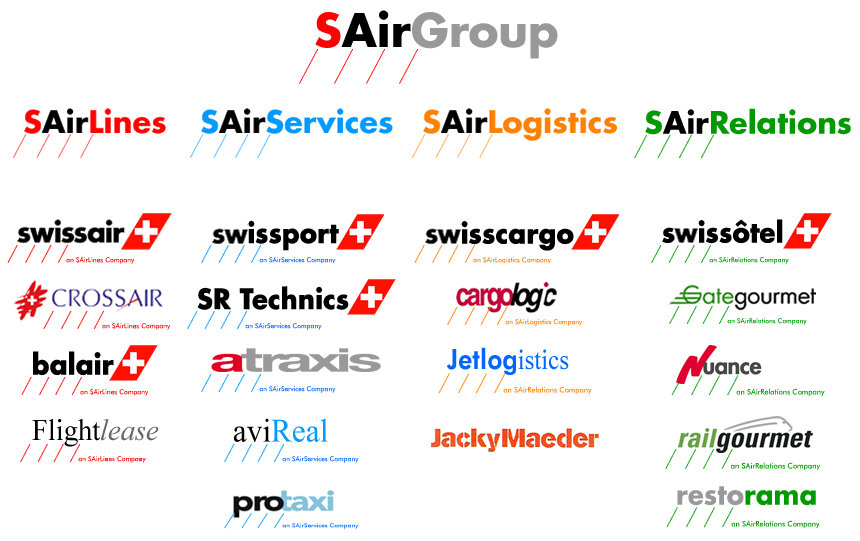
Logos of the firms belonging to the SAirGroup

In the late 1980s and early 1990s, Swissair tried to merge with Air France, Lufthansa, and British Airways to obtain access to a wider European market. Finally, after deregulation, Swissair tried to expand beyond its home market; after the Alcazar project was cancelled, Swissair aimed to be a major force in European aviation.

In the mid-1990s, Swissair initiated the disastrous "Hunter Strategy", a major expansion programme devised by the US consulting firm McKinsey & Co. Using this strategy, Swissair aimed to grow its market share by acquiring small airlines rather than entering into alliance agreements. Swissair decided to acquire 49.5 per cent of the very successful Italian charter airline Air Europe; the unprofitable Belgian flag carrier Sabena; and significant stakes in Air Liberté, AOM, Air Littoral, Volare, LOT, Turkish Airlines, South African Airways, Portugália, and LTU and planned to acquire stakes in Aer Lingus, Finnair, and Malév, as well as Brazilian carriers TAM and Transbrasil. By mid-2000, it was predicted that Swissair would lose between SFr3.25 billion (equivalent to SFr3.51 billion or US$3.86 billion in 2021) and SFr4.45 billion (equivalent to SFr4.81 billion or US$5.29 billion in 2021) over the next three fiscal years. The management, however, maintained classical restructuring, and the Board approved the reorganisation of LTU for approximately SFr500 million (equivalent to SFr540.41 million or US$593.86 million in 2021). Furthermore, there were plans to take over Alitalia.

In October 1999, Delta Air Lines cancelled its transatlantic Atlantic Excellence alliance with Swissair and Sabena, citing the desire to partner with Air France instead.

During the European airline deregulation transition, Jeffrey Katz served as CEO of Swissair from 1997 to 2000, a period of increased fuel prices and industry overcapacity.

In the summer of 2000, SAir's CEO Philippe Bruggisser came under public pressure as the press published the group's financial situation. Each day, Swissair and Sabena were losing one million francs, while LTU and the French investments were losing another million every day. For the first time, the board began to consider scenarios for phasing out its existing participation in other airlines as Swissair looked to withdraw from its foreign investments. In January 2001, Bruggisser was summarily dismissed. Moritz Suter, the founder of Crossair, was nominated as the new CEO of SAirLines and thus all group airlines, including Swissair. After only 44 days in charge, Suter resigned.

In March 2001, two studies by consultants were presented to the board, which showed the financial difficulties of SAirGroup, indicating that the company was facing significant challenges that ultimately led to the resignation of the directors, including issues such as mounting debts and declining revenues. At this point, the directors resigned, with only Mario Corti, the former CFO of Nestlé, remaining. From April to August 2001, the group's Moody's credit rating was gradually downgraded from A3 to B1 (it was downgraded further to B2 on September 18). The buying spree created a major cash flow crisis for parent company SAirGroup and was exacerbated by the environment caused by the September 11 attacks. Unable to make payments to creditors on its large debt, and with the refusal of UBS to extend its line of credit, on 2 October 2001 the entire Swissair fleet was abruptly grounded. Many blamed UBS for the fiasco, causing demonstrators to take to the streets with signs referring to UBS chairman Marcel Ospel as "Bin Ospel", quoting al-Qaeda leader Osama bin Laden, and redefining the bank's acronym, "UBS", as the United Bandits of Switzerland.

Two large bridge loans from the Swiss government were required to finance the continuation of flight operations. This notwithstanding, with the resumption of flight service, it was necessary for flight crews to carry large sums of cash to purchase fuel at foreign airports.

=== Grounding ===
On 1 October 2001, Project "Phoenix" was announced, under which parts of the group sought a payment delay. The Swiss federal authorities were willing to pay back half of the loan, so they secured the continuation of service.

2 October 2001 saw an increased necessity for strong liquidity, as all suppliers insisted on cash payments of outstanding invoices following a request for payment delay announced the day before. The company's cash reserves filed on that day were barely sufficient to carry out the first morning flights. During the morning, fuel suppliers refused to fuel the waiting aircraft. At 15:45 CEST, CEO Mario Corti announced a cessation of flight operations due to the security risks caused by the crossing of the Flight Duty Regulations. These events led to the cancellation of over 230 flights, and thousands of passengers, as well as flight crews, were stranded around the world. The banks froze the flight crew's accounts, leading some hotels to expel the crew and require them to return home at their own expense. All tickets sold were voided.

4 October 2001 saw demonstrations by former Swissair employees before the UBS presentation held in Glattbrugg, and the following day saw demonstrations in Bern's Federal Square.

Around the same time, Swiss banks UBS and Credit Suisse purchased SAirGroup's stake in Crossair. Furthermore, Crossair took over various assets of former Swissair, including its employees, aircraft, and most European routes. Jürg Hoss's liquidation firm took over Swissair and the SAirGroup, ceasing operations on 31 March 2002. Crossair was renamed Swiss International Air Lines, or Swiss for short, and took over Swissair's intercontinental routes on 1 April 2002, officially ending 71 years of Swissair service.

==== Controversy surrounding Corti's decision to ground flights ====
An investigation by the Zurich branch of Ernst & Young into factors behind the grounding revealed that

"...in contradiction to representations made by SAir Group, not just 14.5 million Swiss Francs, but around CHF50 million were available at the company's disposal on the morning of October 2, 2001".

The report further stated that

"Without the administrative inadequacies connected with the release of an escrow account, an additional CHF 73 million would have been available. Thus, overall, some CHF 123 million would have been available at SAirGroup, SAirLines, and Swissair."

Former Crossair executive André Dosé, who also served as the first CEO of successor airline Swiss International Air Lines, stated in 2004 that this meant the grounding was not necessary and that Swissair could have likely continued flying until the financing for a successor airline would have been finalised, a view he reiterated in a 2021 interview. In his 2004 statement, Dose voiced the view that Corti and then-CFO Jacqualyn Fouse had lost oversight of Swissair's finances, accounting for this mismatch in perception of available funds.

Mario Corti vehemently rejected the notion that Swissair and SAirGroup bank accounts together held more than 14 million Swiss francs in a public statement after the Ernst & Young report came out.

=== Transition phase ===
On 5 October, commercial flights on most routes were gradually resumed thanks to a federal emergency loan of over CHF 450 million. This occurred, in part, to ensure Switzerland's continued accessibility as a business location and to establish a basis for the creation of Swiss. By preventing the complete collapse of Swissair, the other airline-related businesses of the group were likewise spared collapse.

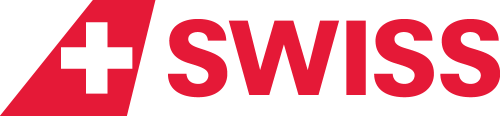
The Swiss International Air Lines logo as of 2011

Following another federal repayable funding commitment of one billion francs, each of the 26 long-haul aircraft (MD-11s and A330s) and 26 medium-haul aircraft (A321s, A320s, and A319s) were able to be transferred to Crossair/Swiss at the end of the winter schedule of 2001/02. On Easter Monday, 1 April 2002, flight SR145 from São Paulo marked the last flight of Swissair, landing in Zürich. A 71-year-long chapter of Swiss aviation history thus came to an end. Between 1931 and 2002, Swissair transported well over 260 million passengers. The SwissairGroup (the name change from SAirGroup to SwissairGroup was announced in 2001 but never officially implemented) still existed as 'SAirGroup in Nachlassstundung' (German: Swissair in Administration) for several years until all assets were liquidated, including a large auction where many of the remaining Swissair assets, such as historic items, were auctioned. Today, Gategourmet continues as a subsidiary of Gategroup.

=== Factors behind collapse ===
Like other airlines that flew to the United States, Swissair's operations and profitability were disrupted in the wake of the terror attacks against the United States. Several politicians were among those included on Swissair's board of directors, and commentators have pointed to potential conflicts of interest as fundamental to the demise of Swissair. Media have also suggested that the board of directors failed to oversee the actions of Philippe Bruggisser (chief operating officer since 1996) and Eric Honegger (board member since 1993 and later board president) and that they left behind a convoluted corporate structure and financial commitments—amongst others, a further purchase of 35.5 per cent of Sabena's stock—which would only come to light when Mario Corti was trying to save the airline.

The judiciary is continuing to examine why Swissair acquired counselling that supported the Hunter Strategy and why Swissair continued to make certain payments despite nearing insolvency. Questions have also been raised about the federal aid given to Swissair and the politicians involved, particularly regarding how this aid may have influenced the airline's financial decisions and its eventual collapse. The highly competitive nature of the market during the business's final years also precipitated its demise: like its Belgian counterpart Sabena, Swissair fell victim to the rise of competition from all-inclusive budget airlines on their short- and medium-haul routes, such as Ryanair and EasyJet.

Imogen Foulkes from the BBC said regarding the collapse, "Something did die in Switzerland that day: not just an airline but an image the Swiss had of themselves and, more importantly, of their business leaders" and "The Swiss financial community's reputation for good business sense was already seriously damaged by the Swissair disaster."

Because civil cases are still going on, some of the reasons why SAirGroup failed are still being looked into by the courts and have not been made clear legally. The following causes are widely recognised as crucial factors:

- The management underestimated the dangers and difficulties in the acquisitions and investments of partially ailing airlines. Therefore, Sabena and LTU were acquired despite significant capital requirements. Also, investments in France (AOM, Air Liberté, and Air Littoral) required much capital restructuring. Sabena ultimately ceased operations due to the aforementioned financial crisis.
- The indebtedness was created by an uncompromising adaptation to the realities of "hunter strategy" implementation and the lack of monitoring by the board, which ultimately contributed to the financial instability that led to Swissair's grounding and Sabena's cessation of operations, particularly exacerbated by the sharp slump in demand following the 2001 terrorist attacks in the US.
- The 2001 terrorist attacks in the US led to a sharp slump in demand and, consequently, to an extreme tightening of liquidity.
- An orderly transfer of operations to Crossair was denied because of the failure to reach a bridging loan and the delayed transfer of the share purchase price.
- Swissair lost passenger revenues due to increasing competition from all-inclusive, low-cost carriers such as Ryanair and EasyJet in the short-to-medium-haul markets within Europe.
- A full merger with Sabena was impossible due to Swissair's financial crisis.
- An MD-11, operating flight 111, crashed in 1998, killing everyone on board. This event led to further troubles for the airline with negative publicity, a significant lawsuit, more financial problems, and lowered customer confidence.

=== Legacy ===
In April 2002, Swiss International Air Lines began its operations. First called Swiss Air Lines, this company was based on the former Crossair and was a merger of Crossair and former Swissair employees, routes, aircraft, and intellectual property. The company Swissair continued to exist (in liquidation) but had no further assets. Due to legal problems with Swissair, the name had to be changed to Swiss International Air Lines.

Swiss took over 26 long-haul and 26 medium-haul aircraft from the defunct Swissair fleet and refurbished the liveries and interiors to turn them into the new Swiss fleet, together with the former Crossair fleet consisting of the Embraer 145, Saab 2000, MD-80 Series, and Avro RJ. The remainder of the Swissair aircraft that were grounded and were not taken by the new company were returned to their lessors.

After problems with the former Crossair pilot unions, who refused to accept different conditions than the former Swissair pilots within the same airline, a subsidiary called 'Swiss European Air Lines' was founded, which belongs 100% to Swiss International Air Lines.

In 2003, it appeared that Swiss was going to become a member of Oneworld. It had codeshares with Oneworld carriers British Airways, American Airlines, Cathay Pacific, Qantas, Aer Lingus and Finnair and held a strategic partnership and joint operation for all service to North America and AA-operated flights beyond U.S. gateways using American Airlines. Swiss started to terminate these codeshare agreements but did not terminate the AA alliance. A theory emerged that Swiss was planning to use its partnerships, the AA alliance, and its partnership with British Airways, a strong and supportive member of OneWorld—to join Oneworld itself.

However, in 2005, Swiss was taken over by Lufthansa, the national airline of Germany. With the merger with Lufthansa, Swiss joined the Star Alliance in 2006, which Swissair planned to join before it failed. With this move, Swiss's frequent flyer club, Swiss TravelClub, became part of Miles & More, which was originally the Lufthansa Group frequent flyer club. It serves as the airline's frequent flyer program, along with many other Lufthansa Group airlines.

=== Management trial ===
A criminal trial began on 16 January 2007 in Bülach. The entire former Swissair management board faced criminal charges of mismanagement, false statements, and document forgery. The top defendants in the trial were Mario Corti, Philippe Bruggisser, George Schorderet, Jacqualyn Fouse, Eric Honegger, and Vreni Spoerry. Corti, Honegger, and Spoerry entered statements proclaiming their innocence.

On 7 June 2007, the court in Bülach cleared the defendants of all criminal charges over the airline's 2001 bankruptcy.

On 29 November 2019, Switzerland’s Federal Court upheld a 2018 decision clearing 14 former Swissair bosses of mismanagement charges related to the airline’s 2001 collapse. The court agreed with the Zurich commercial court’s finding that the company needed funding to continue operations, despite being heavily indebted. The decision confirms the conclusions of the Zurich court, though it reduces the legal costs of the case.

=== Continued use of the "Swissair" brand ===
Swiss retains the rights to the "Swissair" name, whose value was estimated at more than 10 million Swiss francs in 2010. To prevent the trademark from becoming void through disuse, Swiss licensed it to Hopscotch Air, which operates a fleet of Cirrus SR22 planes in the United States, for use from 2010 to 2013. In Switzerland, the trademark is protected through its use by an aviation sports club, Sportfluggruppe Swissair.

== Fleet ==
In its 71 years of existence, Swissair operated the following aircraft:

Aircraft which Swissair has operated
Aircraft	Total	Delivered	Retired	Notes
Airbus A310-200	5	1983	1995	Launch operator. Two aircraft were sold to Air Liberté. Three aircraft were sold to FedEx Express after being converted into freighters.
Airbus A310-300	6	1985	2000	
Airbus A319-100	9	1996	2002	Most aircraft were transferred to Swiss International Air Lines.
Airbus A320-200	20	1995	2002	Most aircraft were transferred to Swiss International Air Lines.
Airbus A321-100	12	1995	2002	Most aircraft were transferred to Swiss International Air Lines.
Airbus A330-200	16	1998	2002	Most aircraft were transferred to Swiss International Air Lines.
BAC One-Eleven	3	1968	1969	Leased to increase capacity.
Boeing 747-200B	2	1971	1984	
Boeing 747-300	2	1983	2000	Launch customer. Sold to South African Airways.
Boeing 747-300M	3	1983	1999	Largest operator of its type along with KLM and Singapore Airlines. Includes one leased aircraft.
Boeing 747-300	4	1983	1999	Launch Customer.
Clark G.A. 43	2	1934	1936	First all-metal aeroplane in Swissair fleet.
Comte AC-4	1	1931	1947	Acquired from Ad Astra. Now in the SR Technics Hangar in Zürich.
Convair CV-240	8	1949	1957	Most aircraft were sold. Some scrapped, and one crashed.
Convair CV-440 Metropolitan	12	1956	1968	Most aircraft were sold. First Swissair plane to use integrated Weather Radar.
Convair CV-880-22M	2	1961	1962	Leased pending delivery of Convair 990s.
Convair CV-990 Coronado	8	1962	1975	Most were sold, one crashed, and one is at the Swiss Transport Museum in Lucerne.
Curtiss AT-32C Condor	1	1934	1934	First European airliner to have a stewardess. It crashed in 1934.
de Havilland Dragon Rapide	3	1937	1954	
de Havilland Mosquito	1	1945	1945	Originally used as a Royal Air Force fighter aircraft in World War II, fell into Swiss hands. Swiss government used it and sold it to Swissair in 1944.
Douglas DC-2	6	1934	1952	Assembled under licence by Fokker at Schiphol Airport near Amsterdam.
Douglas DC-3	16	1937	1969	The first 5 were assembled pre-war by Fokker at Schiphol Airport near Amsterdam. The others were converted USAF C-47's and postwar built aircraft.
Douglas DC-4	5	1946	1959	Used on service to New York-JFK route. Three aircraft were written off.
Douglas DC-6	8	1951	1962	
Douglas DC-7C	5	1956	1962	All aircraft were sold. The Swissair Fleet included the final DC-7 ever built.
Douglas DC-8-32	3	1960	1967	One was converted to a -53 and two were converted to -33's.
Douglas DC-8-53	2	1963	1976	One was converted from a -33. One was hijacked and blown-up after passengers were released.
Douglas DC-8-62	7	1967	1984	Two were operated as a freighter -62Fs.
McDonnell Douglas DC-9-15	5	1966	1968	Sent back to Douglas or sold.
McDonnell Douglas DC-9-32	22	1967	1988	One was operated as a freighter -33F.
Dornier Merkur	2	1931	1931	Acquired from Ad Astra.
Mraz M-65 Cap	1	1948	1950	Built under licence by Fieseler Storch. Later sold to Lindt & Sprüngli.
Fokker VII a	1	1931	1950	Acquired from Balair. Now on display in the Swiss Transport Museum in Lucerne.
Fokker VII b	8	1931	1935	Acquired from Ad Astra and Balair.
Fokker F27	3	1965	1972	Operated for Swissair by Balair.
Fokker 100	6	1988	1996	
Junkers Ju-86 B-0	2	1936	1939	
Lockheed Model 9 Orion	2	1932	1936	Both were sold to the Republicans in the Spanish Civil War. (The example at the Swiss Transport Museum never served in the Swissair fleet, but was instead bought in the 1960s by Swissair, restored to flying status, and painted in Swissair colours).
McDonnell Douglas DC-10-30	12	1972	1992	Launch operator along with KLM. Most were sold to Northwest Airlines.
McDonnell Douglas DC-10-30ER	2	1980	1992	
McDonnell Douglas DC-9-41	4	1974	1975	Leased from Scandinavian Airlines.
McDonnell Douglas DC-9-51	12	1975	1988	
McDonnell Douglas MD-11	22	1991	2002	One crashed operating Flight 111 on September 2, 1998. The remaining aircraft were transferred to Swiss International Air Lines.
McDonnell Douglas MD-81	25	1980	1998	Launch customer of MD-80. Most aircraft were sold to Scandinavian Airlines, Trans World Airlines.
McDonnell Douglas MD-82	3	1982	1996	
McDonnell Douglas MD-83	2	1995	1996	
Messerschmitt M 18	1	1931	1938	Taken over from Ad Astra.
Nord 1000	1	1948	1953	Sold to Federal Air Office.
Scottish Aviation Twin Pioneer	1	1957	1957	Used for high-altitude airports.
Sud Aviation SE210 Caravelle	9	1960	1971	Swissair's first jet airliner. First ones leased from Scandinavian Airlines.

== Destinations ==
Swissair served the following destinations:

=== Asia ===
- China
  - Beijing - Beijing Capital International Airport
  - Shanghai
    - Shanghai Hongqiao International Airport (before 1999)
    - Shanghai Pudong International Airport
  - Hong Kong
    - Hong Kong International Airport
    - Kai Tak Airport (terminated due to airport closure)
- India
  - Delhi – Indira Gandhi International Airport
  - Kolkata - Netaji Subhash Chandra Bose International Airport
  - Mumbai – Chhatrapati Shivaji Maharaj International Airport
- Iran
  - Tehran – Mehrabad International Airport
- Israel
  - Tel Aviv – Ben Gurion Airport
- Japan
  - Osaka – Kansai International Airport
  - Tokyo
    - Haneda Airport (before 1978)
    - Narita International Airport
- Indonesia
  - Jakarta
    - Kemayoran Airport (terminated due to airport closure)
    - Soekarno–Hatta International Airport
- Malaysia
  - Kuala Lumpur
    - Kuala Lumpur International Airport
    - Subang International Airport
- Oman
  - Muscat – Muscat International Airport
- Pakistan
  - Karachi – Jinnah International Airport
- Philippines
  - Manila – Ninoy Aquino International Airport
- Saudi Arabia
  - Jeddah – King Abdulaziz International Airport
  - Riyadh - King Khalid International Airport
- Singapore
  - Singapore – Singapore Changi Airport
- Republic of Korea
  - Seoul – Gimpo International Airport
- Thailand
  - Bangkok – Don Mueang International Airport
- Taiwan
  - Taipei – Chiang Kai-Shek International Airport (as Swissair Asia; the airport was renamed Taoyuan International Airport in 2006)
- United Arab Emirates
  - Abu Dhabi – Abu Dhabi International Airport
  - Dubai – Dubai International Airport
- Vietnam
  - Ho Chi Minh City – Tan Son Nhat International Airport

=== Africa ===
- Algeria
  - Algiers – Houari Boumediene Airport
- Cameroon
  - Douala – Douala International Airport
  - Yaoundé – Yaoundé Nsimalen International Airport
- Democratic Republic of the Congo
  - Kinshasa – N'djili Airport
- Egypt
  - Cairo – Cairo International Airport
- Equatorial Guinea
  - Malabo – Malabo International Airport
- Ethiopia
  - Addis Ababa – Addis Ababa Bole International Airport
- Gabon
  - Libreville – Libreville International Airport
- Gambia
  - Banjul – Banjul International Airport
- Ghana
  - Accra – Accra International Airport
- Ivory Coast
  - Abidjan – Port Bouet Airport
- Kenya
  - Nairobi – Jomo Kenyatta International Airport
- Libya
  - Benghazi – Benina International Airport
- Liberia
  - Monrovia – Roberts International Airport
- Mali
  - Bamako – Bamako–Sénou International Airport
- Morocco
  - Casablanca – Mohammed V International Airport
- Nigeria
  - Lagos – Murtala Muhammed International Airport
- Republic of the Congo
  - Brazzaville – Maya-Maya Airport
- Senegal
  - Dakar – Léopold Sédar Senghor International Airport
- South Africa
  - Cape Town – Cape Town International Airport
  - Johannesburg – O. R. Tambo International Airport
- Sudan
  - Khartoum – Khartoum International Airport
- Tanzania
  - Dar es Salaam – Julius Nyerere International Airport
- Tunisia
  - Tunis – Tunis–Carthage International Airport
- Zimbabwe
  - Harare – Robert Gabriel Mugabe International Airport

=== Europe ===
- Austria
  - Linz - Linz Airport
  - Vienna – Vienna International Airport
- Belgium
  - Brussels – Brussels Airport
- Cyprus
  - Larnaca – Larnaca International Airport
- Czech Republic
  - Prague – Prague Ruzyně Airport
- France
  - Bordeaux – Bordeaux–Mérignac Airport
  - Lyon – Lyon–Saint-Exupéry Airport
  - Paris
    - Charles de Gaulle Airport
    - Orly Airport
  - Strasbourg – Strasbourg Airport
  - Toulouse – Toulouse–Blagnac Airport
- Germany
  - Berlin – Berlin Tegel Airport
  - Düsseldorf – Düsseldorf Airport
  - Frankfurt – Frankfurt Airport
  - Hanover – Hannover Airport
  - Munich
    - Munich-Riem Airport (terminated due to airport closure)
    - Munich Airport
  - Nuremberg – Nuremberg Airport
  - Stuttgart – Stuttgart Airport
- Greece
  - Athens
    - Athens International Airport
    - Ellinikon International Airport (until 2001)
  - Thessaloniki – Thessaloniki Airport
- Hungary
  - Budapest – Budapest Ferihegy International Airport
- Italy
  - Bologna - Bologna Guglielmo Marconi Airport
  - Florence - Florence Airport
  - Milan – Milan Malpensa Airport
  - Rome – Leonardo da Vinci–Fiumicino Airport
  - Venice – Venice Marco Polo Airport
- Netherlands
  - Amsterdam – Amsterdam Airport Schiphol
- Norway
  - Oslo
    - Oslo Fornebu Airport (terminated due to airport closure)
    - Oslo Gardermoen Airport
- Poland
  - Kraków – Kraków John Paul II International Airport
  - Warsaw – Warsaw Chopin Airport
- Portugal
  - Lisbon – Lisbon Airport
  - Porto – Porto Airport
- Russia
  - Moscow – Sheremetyevo International Airport
  - Saint Petersburg – Pulkovo Airport
- Serbia
  - Belgrade – Belgrade Nikola Tesla Airport
- Spain
  - Alicante – Alicante–Elche Miguel Hernández Airport
  - Barcelona – Josep Tarradellas Barcelona–El Prat Airport
  - Madrid – Adolfo Suárez Madrid–Barajas Airport
- Sweden
  - Stockholm – Stockholm Arlanda Airport
- Switzerland
  - Bern – Bern Airport
  - Geneva – Geneva Airport - hub
  - Zurich – Zurich Airport - hub
- Switzerland / France / Germany
  - Basel, Mulhouse, Freiburg – EuroAirport Basel Mulhouse Freiburg - hub
- Turkey
  - Istanbul – Istanbul Atatürk International Airport
- Ukraine
  - Kyiv – Boryspil International Airport
- United Kingdom
  - London
    - London City Airport
    - London Gatwick International Airport
    - London Heathrow International Airport
  - Manchester – Manchester Airport

=== Americas ===
- Argentina
  - Buenos Aires – Ministro Pistarini International Airport
- Brazil
  - Rio de Janeiro – Rio de Janeiro/Galeão International Airport
  - São Paulo – São Paulo/Guarulhos International Airport
- Canada
  - Montreal
    - Montréal–Mirabel International Airport
    - Montréal–Trudeau International Airport
  - Toronto – Toronto Pearson International Airport
  - Vancouver - Vancouver International Airport
- Chile
  - Santiago – Arturo Merino Benítez International Airport
- Colombia
  - Bogotá – El Dorado International Airport
- United States
  - Atlanta – Hartsfield–Jackson Atlanta International Airport
  - Boston – Logan International Airport
  - Chicago – O'Hare International Airport
  - Dallas/Fort Worth – Dallas Fort Worth International Airport
  - Los Angeles – Los Angeles International Airport
  - New York City – John F. Kennedy International Airport
  - Newark – Newark Liberty International Airport
  - Miami – Miami International Airport
  - San Francisco - San Francisco International Airport
  - Seattle - Seattle–Tacoma International Airport
  - Washington, D.C. – Washington Dulles International Airport
- Venezuela
  - Caracas – Simón Bolívar International Airport

== Swissair Asia ==
Due to Taiwan's relations with China, Swissair Asia was formed to serve Taipei, Taiwan, also known as the Republic of China, while Swissair maintained service to the People's Republic of China.

== Corporate affairs ==
Swissair's head office was on the grounds of Zurich Airport and in Kloten.

KSG, Architects G. Müller + G. Berger designed the final head office complex for the airline. It was in proximity to the main airport facilities and area motorways. The first phase of the building included offices for 1,600 workers, computer rooms, printing rooms, and 500-seat restaurant facilities. The second phase included an open-plan office room, another computer laboratory, and expansions of the restaurant facilities.

In the 1930s, the head office was in the Dübendorf Aerodrome in Zürich.

== Accidents and incidents ==
Over the 71-year history of Swissair, there were 11 major incidents reported, resulting in 414 fatalities.

HB-IWF, the aircraft that crashed into the Atlantic Ocean as Flight 111

Flight number	Date	Registration number	Model	Fatalities	Details
N/A	27 July 1934	CH-170	Curtiss AT-32C Condor II	12	Crashed due to wing failure in severe turbulence. Oscillations in the wing caused a stress fracture, made worse by the storm the aircraft was flying through. However, German investigators determined that two fractures formed: one in the wing and engine mount due to defective construction and improper welding, and the second resulted from turbulence in the storm.
N/A	7 January 1939	HB-ITA	Douglas DC-2	5	Crashed after striking a hill.
N/A	20 July 1939	HB-IXA	Junkers Ju 86	6	Crashed following an engine fire.
N/A	19 June 1954	HB-IRW	Convair CV-240	3	Crashed due to fuel starvation in the English Channel, near Folkestone. All three crew members survived, but three of the five passengers drowned as they were unable to swim. Passenger aircraft at this time were not obliged to carry life rafts or life jackets, and this was one of the many incidents which led to such a requirement becoming law.
N/A	15 July 1956	HB-IMD	Convair CV-440	4	The aircraft crashed during a delivery flight from San Diego, California to Zürich via New York City, Gander and Shannon. On approach to Shannon, the pilots executed an abnormally steep turn, causing the aircraft to stall and drop to the ground.
N/A	18 June 1957	HB-IRK	Douglas DC-3	9	Crashed during an exercise conducted under visual flight rules. The exercise aimed to practice flying with one engine switched off and propellers feathered.
306	4 September 1963	HB-ICV	Caravelle	80	The pilot taxied along the runway at a high engine setting to clear the fog. This caused the brakes to overheat, which then started a fire that damaged hydraulic lines and led to a loss of control. The accident had a significant impact on the small town of Humlikon: 43 of the just 200 residents died on that flight.
N/A	10 February 1967	HB-IMF	Convair CV-440	4	Collided with a cloud-covered mountain during a training flight.
330	21 February 1970	HB-ICD	Convair CV-990	47	A bomb on board the flight from Zürich to Tel Aviv, detonated in the aft cargo compartment of the aircraft about nine minutes after take-off climb-out. The aircraft crashed due to a subsequent electrical fire that crippled the aircraft before the pilots could attempt an emergency landing at Zürich.
100	6 September 1970	HB-IDD	Douglas DC-8	0	Swissair Flight 100, from Zürich to New York, was hijacked by a man and a woman and diverted to Dawson's Field in Jordan. The 145 passengers, along with 260 others from two other hijacked aircraft, were held hostage by the PFLP. The three empty aircraft were subsequently blown up on September 12.
316	8 October 1979	HB-IDE	Douglas DC-8	14	Landed under "adverse conditions" at Athens Ellinikon International Airport, overshooting the runway and killing fourteen passengers. The plane touched down at too great a speed and too far along the runway for the pilots to use sufficient braking and reverse thrust.
111	2 September 1998	HB-IWF	McDonnell Douglas MD-11	229	Flying from New York's JFK International Airport to Geneva, the MD-11 crashed in the Atlantic due to an onboard cockpit fire caused by arcing and subsequent instrument failure at night off the coast of Peggy's Cove, 30 km southwest of Halifax, Nova Scotia. This became the second-deadliest aviation accident in Canadian history, just after Arrow Air Flight 1285R.

== Bibliography ==
- Benedikt Meyer: Im Flug. Schweizer Airlines und ihre Passagiere, 1919–2002. Chronos, Zürich 2014, ISBN 978-3-0340-1238-6.
- Cooksley, Peter (September–October 1996). "Celestial Coaches: Dornier's Record Breaking Komet and Merkur". Air Enthusiast (65): 20–24. ISSN 0143-5450.
