= Mario Corti (manager) =

Swiss businessman

- Born: Mario Corti; October 22, 1946 (age 79); Lausanne, Vaud, Switzerland
- Education: University of Lausanne (PhD); Harvard Business School (MBA)
- Occupations: Businessman, pilot and former aviation executive
- Known for: Being the former CEO and chairman of Swissair
- Spouse: Joy Archambault

Mario Corti (born October 22, 1946) is a Swiss-born businessman, commercial pilot and former aviation executive. Corti is the former CEO and chairman of defunct Swissair.

== Early life and education ==
Corti was born October 22, 1946, in Lausanne, Switzerland to Jean Wilhelm 'Willi' and Meta (née Gafafer) Corti. He had two sisters and grew up in Kirchberg near Bern. His father was a former executive of Alusuisse who became a partner in the manufacturing firm Nyffeler Corti, which manufactured aluminium packaging and later merged with Kaiser Aluminium. The Corti family originally hailed from Stabio in the Ticino region of Switzerland and became citizens in Winterthur in 1882.

He completed his Matura in Burgdorf. He completed his Doctorate in Economics and Law at the University of Lausanne in 1971. In 1975, Corti earned a master's degree in business administration from Harvard Business School.

== Career ==
After graduation from Harvard Business School, Corti worked as a business planner for Kaiser Aluminum & Chemical Corporation in California. Following his return to his home country in 1977, he worked first at the Swiss National Bank and then as Under Secretary for Foreign Trade. In 1990, he accepted a position with Nestlé USA and became chief financial officer in 1996. In April 2000, Corti left Nestle and joined Swissair. Corti began his term as the Swissair CEO in March 2001. He was put on trial, accused of unlawful management in regards to the failure of Swissair in 2001. Corti was acquitted of all charges.

== Personal life ==
Corti is also known as "Super Mario". In 1992 Corti flew a twin-engine plane around the globe as a pilot, and in 1999 across the Atlantic. Corti is married to Joy (née Archambault)

Corti and resides in Savannah, Georgia. He has dual Swiss-United States citizenship. They have no children.
