= List of Boeing 777 orders and deliveries =

This article lists the orders and deliveries for the Boeing 777. As of September 2026, the largest airline orders are by Emirates (420), Qatar Airways (211), and Singapore Airlines (116).

== History ==
The title of largest 777 operator has changed hands during the aircraft's history. Singapore Airlines' order for up to 77 aircraft on November 15, 1995 constituted the largest-ever wide-body aircraft purchase at the time. The purchase comprised 34 firm orders and 43 options for the 777-200ER, all to be powered by Trent 800 series engines, and was valued at US$12.7 billion. The number of 777 customers had grown to 25 airlines by June 1997, with 323 aircraft on order. On August 26, 2004, Singapore Airlines followed up with a US$4 billion order for the 777-300ER, including 18 firm orders and 13 options. The combined orders would make the carrier's 777 fleet number 77 when deliveries were complete.

On November 20, 2005, Emirates placed the largest firm order for the 777. Totaling 42 aircraft, including 24 −300ERs, 10 −200LRs and 8 777Fs, the purchase was reportedly worth US$9.7 billion. The Middle Eastern carrier followed up with another order for 30 −300ERs at the 2010 Farnborough Airshow.

On September 19, 2013, Lufthansa confirmed a firm order of 20 777-9Xs prior to an official launch of the aircraft. Boeing launched the 777X at the 2013 Dubai Air Show. In March 2014, ANA of Japan ordered 20 777-9X models.

== Orders and deliveries ==
=== Orders and deliveries by type and year ===
Boeing 777 orders and deliveries by type
	Total orders	Total deliveries	Unfilled
777-200	88	88	–
777-200ER	422	422	–
777-200LR	61	61	–
777-300	60	60	–
777-300ER	838	833	5
777F	370	334	36
777X	666	–	666
Total	2,505	1,798	707

Orders and deliveries through October 31, 2026

Boeing 777 orders and deliveries by year
		2015	2016	2017	2018	2019	2020	2021	2022	2023	2024	2025	2026	Total
Orders		58	23	53	51	-3	10	53	68	100	62	154	48	2,505
Deliveries	−200	–	–	–	–	–	–	–	–	–	–	–	–	88
Deliveries	−200ER	–	–	–	–	–	–	–	–	–	–	–	–	422
Deliveries	−200LR	–	–	–	–	1	–	1	–	–	–	–	–	61
Deliveries	−300	–	–	–	–	–	–	–	–	–	–	–	–	60
Deliveries	−300ER	79	88	65	32	19	4	7	3	–	1	–	–	833
Deliveries	777F	19	11	9	16	25	22	16	21	26	13	35	21	334
Deliveries	777X	–	–	–	–	–	–	–	–	–	–	–	–	–
Deliveries	All	98	99	74	48	45	26	24	24	26	14	35	21	1,798

		90−94	1995	1996	1997	1998	1999	2000	2001	2002	2003	2004	2005	2006	2007	2008	2009	2010	2011	2012	2013	2014
Orders		112	101	68	54	68	35	116	30	32	13	42	153	76	110	39	30	75	194	75	121	277
Deliveries	−200	–	13	32	11	10	3	9	3	–	1	2	3	–	1	–	–	–	–	–	–	–
Deliveries	−200ER	–	–	–	48	50	63	42	55	41	29	22	13	23	19	3	4	3	–	3	4	–
Deliveries	−200LR	–	–	–	–	–	–	–	–	–	–	–	–	2	10	11	16	9	6	1	1	3
Deliveries	−300	–	–	–	–	14	17	4	3	6	9	2	4	1	–	–	–	–	–	–	–	–
Deliveries	−300ER	–	–	–	–	–	–	–	–	–	–	10	20	39	53	47	52	40	52	60	79	83
Deliveries	777F	–	–	–	–	–	–	–	–	–	–	–	–	–	–	–	16	22	15	19	14	13
Deliveries	777X	–	–	–	–	–	–	–	–	–	–	–	–	–	–	–	–	–	–	–	–	–
Deliveries	All	–	13	32	59	74	83	55	61	47	39	36	40	65	83	61	88	74	73	83	98	99

Orders through October 31, 2026 and deliveries

Boeing 777 orders and deliveries (cumulative, by year):

Orders Deliveries through October 31, 2026

=== Orders and deliveries sortable, presorted by customer ===
Customer	Orders											Deliveries							
Customer	777 -200	777 -200ER	777 -200LR	777 -300	777 -300ER	777F	777X	Total	PW	GE	RR	777 -200	777 -200ER	777 -200LR	777 -300	777 -300ER	777F	777X	Total
Aeroflot					22			22		*						22			22
Aerotranscargo						2		2		*							2		2
Air Austral			1					1		*				1					1
Air Canada			6		19			25		*				6		19			25
Air China	10				28			38	10	28		10				28			38
Air China Cargo						13		13		*							13		13
Air France		18			36	5		59		*			18			36	5		59
Air France–KLM					1			1		*						1			1
Air India			8		15		10	33		*				8		15			23
Air Lease Corporation					21			21		*						21			21
Air New Zealand		4			5			9		5	4		4			5			9
Alitalia		6						6		*			6						6
All Nippon Airways	16	12		7	28	2	18	83	35	48		16	12		7	28	2		65
Altavair LLC					1	3		4		*						1	3		4
American Airlines		47			20			67		20	47		47			20			67
Asiana Airlines		10						10	*				10						10
A/S Maersk Aviation Holding						2		2		*							2		2
Atlas Air						6		6		*							6		6
Austrian Airlines		1						1		*			1						1
Azerbaijan Airlines			1					1		*				1					1
Biman Bangladesh Airlines					4			4		*						4			4
BOC Aviation		2		4	13			19		13	6		2		4	13			19
Boeing Capital Corporation						2		2		*							2		2
British Airways	5	44			16		24	89		69	20	5	44			16			65
Business Jet / VIP Customer(s)			2		4			6		*				2		4			6
Cargolux							10	10		*									
Cathay Pacific	5			12	49		35	101		84	17	5			12	49			66
CEIBA Intercontinental			1					1		*				1					1
CES Leasing Corporation						16		16		*							15		15
China Airlines					6	12	23	41		*						6	10		16
China Cargo Airlines						3		2		*							3		2
China Eastern Airlines					20			20		*						20			20
China Postal Airlines						2		2		*							2		2
China Southern Airlines	4	2			15	21	5	47		*		4	2			15	19		40
CMA CGM						5		5		*							5		4
DAE 4 Ireland Limited						1		1		*							1		1
Delta Air Lines		8	10					18		10	8		8	10					18
Deucalion Capital VII Limited						8		8		*							8		8
DHL Aviation						28		28		*							28		28
Dream Aviation Ltd.		1						1		*			1						1
Dubai Aerospace Enterprise						13		13		*							13		13
EgyptAir		5						5	*				5						5
El Al Israel Airlines		6						6			*		6						6
Emirates	3	6	10		114	17	270	420		411	9	3	6	10		114	14		147
Ethiopian Airlines			6			13	16	35		*				6			11		17
Etihad Airways					18	6	15	39		*						18	6		24
EVA Air					20	9		29		*						20	9		29
FedEx						60		60		*							53		53
Garuda Indonesia					10			10		*						10			10
GECAS		4			49	10		63		*			4			49	10		63
ILFC		43		8	28			79	6	61	12		43		8	28			79
Japan Airlines	15	11		7	13			46	22	24		15	11		7	13			46
Jet Airways					10			10		*						10			10
Kenya Airways		4			1			5		1	4		4			1			5
KLM		6			11			17		*			6			11			17
Korean Air		18		4	23	10	48	103	22	81			18		4	23	10		55
Kuwait Airways		2			10			12		*			2			10			12
LATAM Airlines Group						2		2		*							2		2
LATAM Brasil					10			10		*						10			10
Lauda Air		3						3		*			3						3
Lufthansa Cargo						12		12		*							12		12
Lufthansa							27	27		*									
Malaysia Airlines		17						17			*		15						15
Mediterranean Shipping Company						3	5	8		*							3		3
National Airlines						4		4		*							4		4
Novus Aviation Capital					4			4		*						4			4
Mid East Jet		1						1		*			1						1
Oak Hill						4		4		*							4		4
Pakistan International Airlines		3	2		8			13		*			3	2		3			8
Philippine Airlines					4			4		*						4			4
Qatar Airways			9		48	30	124	211		*				9		48	30		87
Republic of Iraq			1					1		*				1					1
Saudia		23			33	4		60		*			23			33			56
Silk Way West Airlines						6	2	8		*							4		4
Singapore Airlines		46		12	27		31	116		58	58		46		12	27			85
Swiss International Air Lines					12			12		*						12			12
TAAG Angola Airlines		3			5			8		*			3			5			8
Thai Airways	8	6		6	22			42		22	20	8	6		6	22			42
Turkish Airlines					33	12		45		*						33	12		45
Turkmenistan Airlines			4					4		*				4					4
Unidentified Customer(s)					15	15	2	32		*						15	6		21
United Airlines	22	58			22			102	60	42		22	58			22			102
Vietnam Airlines		4						4	*				4						4
Virgin Australia					4			4		*						4			4
Volga-Dnepr UK Ltd						6		6		*									
Voyager Aviation Aircraft Leasing					4			4		*						4			4
Yangtze River Finance Leasing						2		2		*							2		2
Total	88	422	61	60	838	370	665	2,504	174	2,104	226	88	422	61	60	833	332	—	1,796

Data through Sep 30, 2026.

== See also ==
- List of Airbus A350 XWB orders and deliveries
- List of Boeing 777 operators
- List of Boeing 787 orders and deliveries
