= List of Boeing 777X orders and deliveries =

Boeing 777X orders and deliveries

This article lists the orders and deliveries for the Boeing 777X family, currently produced by Boeing.

== Summary of orders and deliveries by type ==
Type	Orders	Deliveries	Backlog
B777-8	35	0	35
B777-9	546	0	546
B777-8F	101	0	101
TOTAL	682	0	682

As of September 2026

== Orders and deliveries by customer ==
=== Detailed orders and deliveries by customer ===
Customer	Date of order	Firm orders				Options			Deliveries				Notes
Customer	Date of order	B777-8	B777-9	B777-8F	Total	B777-8 / B777-9	B777-8F	Total	B777-8	B777-9	B777-8F	Total	Notes
Air India	20 Jun 2023	–	+ 10	–	10	–	–	0	–	0	–	0	
ANA (All Nippon Airways)	31 Jul 2014	–	+ 20	–	20	–	–	0	–	0	0	0	
ANA (All Nippon Airways)	11 Jul 2022	–	2	+ 2	20	–	–	0	–	0	0	0	
IAG (British Airways)	28 Feb 2019	–	+ 18	–	24	+ 24	–	18	–	0	0	0	
IAG (British Airways)	9 May 2025	–	+ 6	–	24	6	–	18	–	0	0	0	
Cargolux	12 Oct 2022	–	–	+ 10	10	–	+ 6	6	–	–	0	0	
Cathay Pacific	27 Dec 2013	–	+ 21	–	35	–	–	0	–	0	0	0	
Cathay Pacific	6 Aug 2025	–	+ 14	–	35	–	–	0	–	0	0	0	
China Airlines	27 Dec 2013	–	+ 10	+ 4	23	+ 5	+ 4	0	–	0	0	0	
China Airlines	6 Aug 2025	–	+ 5	+ 4	23	5	4	0	–	0	0	0	
China Southern Cargo	Jun 2026	–	–	+ 5	5	–	–	0	–	–	0	0	
Emirates	9 Jul 2014	+ 35	+ 115	–	270	+ 50	–	0	0	0	–	0	
Emirates	20 Nov 2019	10	14	–	270	–	–	0	0	0	–	0	
Emirates	13 Dec 2019	9	2	–	270	+ 11	–	0	0	0	–	0	
Emirates	Jun 2023	16	+ 16	–	270	–	–	0	0	0	–	0	
Emirates	13 Nov 2023	+ 35	+ 55	–	270	61	–	0	0	0	–	0	
Emirates	17 Nov 2025	–	+ 65	–	270	–	–	0	0	0	–	0	
Ethiopian Airlines	5 Mar 2024	–	+ 8	–	16	+ 12	–	4	–	0	0	0	
Ethiopian Airlines	30 Sep 2026	–	–	+ 8	16	8	–	4	–	0	0	0	
Etihad Airways	17 Nov 2013	+ 8	+ 17	–	10	+ 12	–	0	–	0	0	0	
Etihad Airways	Nov 2025	8	7	–	10	12	–	0	–	0	0	0	
Korean Air	24 Mar 2025	–	+ 20	–	48	–	–	0	–	0	–	0	
Korean Air	15 Sep 2026	–	+ 20	+ 8	48	–	–	0	–	0	–	0	
Lufthansa	18 Sep 2013	–	+ 20	–	27	+ 14	–	14	–	0	0	0	
Lufthansa	9 May 2022	–	–	+ 7	27	–	–	14	–	0	0	0	
MSC Air Cargo	21 Jul 2026	–	–	+ 5	5	–	–	0	–	–	0	0	
Qatar Airways	16 Jul 2014	–	+ 50	–	124	+ 50	–	96	–	0	0	0	
Qatar Airways	15 Jun 2015	–	+ 10	–	124	–	–	96	–	0	0	0	
Qatar Airways	31 Jan 2022	–	-20	+ 34	124	–	+ 16	96	–	0	0	0	
Qatar Airways	23 Jul 2024	–	+ 20	–	124	20	–	96	–	0	0	0	
Qatar Airways	15 May 2025	–	+ 30	–	124	+ 50	–	96	–	0	0	0	
Silk Way West Airlines	10 Nov 2022	–	–	+ 2	2	–	+ 2	2	–	–	0	0	
Singapore Airlines	19 Jun 2017	–	+ 20	–	31	+5	–	0	–	0	0	0	
Singapore Airlines	9 Feb 2021	–	+ 11	–	31	-5	–	0	–	0	0	0	Converted from 14 B787-10 aircraft
Unidentified Customer	Apr 2024	–	+ 2	–	7	–	–	0	–	0	–	0	
Unidentified Customer	Dec 2025	–	+ 5	–	7	–	–	0	–	0	–	0	
Adjustment	Jul 2026	–	+ 3	+ 12	15	–	–	0	–	0	–	0	
TOTAL		35	546	101	682	116	24	140	0	0	0	0	

As of September 2026

=== Summary of the orders and deliveries by customers ===
As of September 2026

== Orders and deliveries by year ==
=== Distributive representation ===
B777X family orders and deliveries by year (distributive)
		2013	2014	2015	2016	2017	2018	2019	2020	2021	2022	2023	2024	2025	2026	
Orders	Total 777X family	80	220	10	0	20	0	-17	0	11	33	100	30	137	58	
Deliveries	B777-8	–	–	–	–	–	–	–	–	–	–	–	–	–	–	
Deliveries	B777-9	–	–	–	–	–	–	–	–	–	–	–	–	–	–	
Deliveries	B777-8F	–	–	–	–	–	–	–	–	–	–	–	–	–	–	
Deliveries	Total 777X family	0	0	0	0	0	0	0	0	0	0	0	0	0	0	
		2027	2028	2029	2030	2031	2032	2033	2034	2035	2036	2037	2038	2039	2040	Total
Orders	Total 777X family	–	–	–	–	–	–	–	–	–	–	–	–	–	–	682
Deliveries	B777-8	–	–	–	–	–	–	–	–	–	–	–	–	–	–	0
Deliveries	B777-9	–	–	–	–	–	–	–	–	–	–	–	–	–	–	0
Deliveries	B777-8F	–	–	–	–	–	–	–	–	–	–	–	–	–	–	0
Deliveries	Total 777X family	0	0	0	0	0	0	0	0	0	0	0	0	0	0	0

As of September 2026

=== Cumulative representation ===
Orders Deliveries —

As of September 2026

== See also ==
- List of Airbus A330 orders and deliveries
- List of Airbus A350 orders and deliveries
- List of Boeing 777 orders and deliveries
- List of Boeing 787 orders and deliveries
