= List of Airbus A350 orders and deliveries =

The Airbus A350 is a long-range widebody airliner designed and manufacturered by Airbus. Since orders opened in 2006, over 1,500 have been placed, and as of 2026, over 700 have been delivered.

The largest operators of the A350 family are Singapore Airlines, Qatar Airways, Cathay Pacific, and Air France.

== Orders and deliveries ==
=== Orders and deliveries by type ===
The 1,000 order milestone was surpassed by the A350 aircraft family in June 2023 and by the A350-900 aircraft family member exactly two years later, in June 2025. The A350 has 1,628 firm orders from 66 customers, of which Turkish Airlines is the largest with 110 orders, and 743 aircraft have been delivered as of October 2026.

Orders and deliveries by type (summary)
Type	Orders	Deliveries	Backlog
A350-900	1140	620	520
A350-1000	373	123	250
A350F	115	–	115
A350 family	1,628	743	885

=== Orders and deliveries by year ===
A350 family orders and deliveries by year (distributive)
		2021	2022	2023	2024	2025	2026	Total
Orders		2	8	281	138	185	99	1,628
Deliveries	A350-900	49	50	52	44	42	30	620
Deliveries	A350-1000	6	10	12	13	15	14	123
Deliveries	A350F	–	–	–	–	–	–	–
Deliveries	A350 family	55	60	64	57	57	44	743

		2006	2007	2008	2009	2010	2011	2012	2013	2014	2015	2016	2017	2018	2019	2020
Orders		2	292	163	51	78	−31	27	230	−32	−3	41	36	40	32	−11
Deliveries	A350-900	–	–	–	–	–	–	–	–	1	14	49	78	79	87	45
Deliveries	A350-1000	–	–	–	–	–	–	–	–	–	–	–	–	14	25	14
Deliveries	A350F	–	–	–	–	–	–	–	–	–	–	–	–	–	–	–
Deliveries	A350 family	–	–	–	–	–	–	–	–	1	14	49	78	93	112	59

A350 family orders and deliveries by year (cumulative)

Orders Deliveries — as of October 2026

=== Orders and deliveries by customer ===
Orders and deliveries by customer
Date of initial order	Customer	First delivery	Orders -900	Orders -1000	Orders F	Total	Deliveries -900	Deliveries -1000	Deliveries F	Total	Notes
25 July 2024	Abra Group		5			5					
26 October 2007	AerCap / ILFC	2015	20			20	20			20	Order was originally for 6 A350-800s and 14 A350-900s. Converted to all A350-900s in January 2014.
20 June 2007	Aeroflot	2020	16			16	7			7	Further deliveries halted due to sanctions applied as a result of the 2022 Russian invasion of Ukraine.
10 December 2007	Afriqiyah Airways		10			10					Originally ordered six A350-800s. Converted on 1 October 2012 to 10 A350-900s.
12 December 2024	Aircalin		2			2					
11 February 2026	Air Canada			8		8					Ordered 8 A350-1000s with options for 8 more.
20 December 2013	Air Caraïbes	2020		4		4		4		4	
4 November 2010	Air China	2018	45			45	30			30	
14 November 2025	Air China Cargo				10	10					
18 November 2025	Air Europa		20			20					
19 June 2013	Air France	2019	86	3	3	92	40			40	In June 2019, Air France-KLM announced Air France will become the sole operator of the group's A350s. Order for 10 additional A350s on 11 December 2019. Order for 50 additional A350s on 25 September 2023. Order for 8 A350-1000s converted to 8 A350-900s in July 2025.
14 February 2023	Air India	2023	25	25		50	6	1		7	First six jets originally destined for Aeroflot.
4 February 2013	Air Lease Corporation	2017	18	8		26	18	8		26	
18 November 2014	Air Mauritius	2019	5			5	2			2	
18 June 2007	ALAFCO	2017	12			12	12			12	
16 July 2008	Asiana Airlines	2017	30			30	15			15	
16 March 2026	Atlas Air				20	20					Order for 20 A350 freighters, becoming the largest customer of the type. Deliveries from 2029-2034
16 June 2025	AviLease				10	10					
7 October 2026	Biman Bangladesh Airlines		4			4					Order for 4 A350-900s in 2026.
	BOC Aviation		2			2	2			2	
25 September 2013	British Airways	2019		24		24		18		18	Order for 18 jets in 2013, with a follow up for a further 6 in 2025.
16 September 2010	Cathay Pacific	2016	28	18	8	54	28	18		46	Originally ordered 30 A350-900s. It added six more A350-900s on 20 January 2012. Order for 16 -900s converted to A350-1000s and 10 more ordered on 8 August 2012. Subsequently, converted six A350-1000s to -900s on 13 September 2017. Cathay Pacific ordered 6 Airbus A350 freighters on 8 December 2023 with options for 20 more.
22 January 2008	China Airlines	2016	14	15		29	14			14	Ordered additional five A350-1000 on 18 December 2025, taking order from 10 to 15.
29 April 2016	China Eastern Airlines	2018	20			20	20			20	
10 May 2017	China Southern Airlines	2019	20			20	20			20	
20 June 2007	CIT Group	2015	7			7	7			7	Originally 5 A350-800s and 2 A350-900s. The -800 orders were cancelled on 1 July 2011, three -900s added. Additional 10 -900s were added on 3 January 2013. One -900 was cancelled on 30 November 2013.
8 December 2021	CMA CGM Air Cargo				8	8					
5 July 2019	DAE Capital		2			2	2			2	
19 November 2014	Delta Air Lines	2017	50	20		70	33			33	Firm ordered 20 A350-1000s in January 2024 with options for another 20 -1000 aircraft. Delta ordered up to 40 Airbus A350-1000 wide-body planes. Order for 15 additional A350-900s in January 2026.
11 October 2023	Egyptair		16			16	4			4	
14 February 2019	Emirates	2024	73			73	28			28	Order revised in November 2019 from an initial number of 30 aircraft ordered in February. A top-up order of 8 A350-900s placed at Dubai Air Show 2025.
15 November 2009	Ethiopian Airlines	2017	35	4		39	18	4		22	Orders for 4 -900s converted to A350-1000. An additional 11 A350-900 orders announced at Dubai Air Show 2023.
14 July 2008	Etihad Airways	2019		27	10	37		12		12	
29 December 2023	EVA Air			24		24					
8 March 2007	Finnair	2015	19			19	18			18	Original order for 11 A350-900s. 8 more aircraft converted from options to orders on 3 December 2014.
	Generic - Unknown Entities		2			2	2			2	
	Governments, executive and private jets		10			10	4			4	Three aircraft are ordered by German government.
10 July 2015	Groupe Dubreuil	2017	1			1	1			1	
13 October 2010	Hong Kong Airlines	2018	3			3	3			3	
25 September 2013	Iberia	2018	29			29	21			21	Five orders transferred from Aer Lingus.
7 May 2024	IndiGo		60			60					
7 October 2013	Japan Airlines	2019	39	13		52	18	11		29	Additional 21 A350-900 ordered on 21 March 2024.
21 March 2024	Korean Air	2024	6	20	7	33	3			3	6 A350-900 and 27 A350-1000 ordered on 21 March 2024. First two delivered were cascaded from Asiana's orderbook following their merger.
19 February 2014	Kuwait Airways		2			2					
21 January 2008	LATAM Airlines Group	2015	13			13	13			13	Six A350-900 orders converted to the -1000 variant in 2015. Two converted back to -900s in September 2017.
10 December 2007	Libyan Airlines		6			6					Order was originally for four A350-800s. Orders were converted to six A350-900s during January 2014.
19 September 2013	Lufthansa	2016	60	15		75	30			30	Ordered 20 additional A350-900 in March 2019. Ordered five additional A350-900 in May 2021.
27 January 2023	Martinair				3	3					
18 June 2025	MNG Airlines				2	2					
31 May 2016	Philippine Airlines	2018	6	9		15	6	4		10	Ordered nine A350-1000s in June 2023.
30 June 2022	Qantas	2026		24		24					Twelve A350-1000ULRs to fly direct from Australia to Europe and New York.
18 June 2007	Qatar Airways	2014	34	42		76	34	30		64	The first order included 20 A350-800s. These were converted to 3 A350-900s and 17 A350-1000s on 3 December 2012. Qatar Airways was the launch customer of the A350-900 and A350-1000. It operated its first A350 commercial service on 15 January 2015.
16 June 2025	Riyadh Air			31		31					
3 October 2013	Scandinavian Airlines	2019	8			8	8			8	Deliveries to take place from 2019 to 2021.
28 June 2016	Sichuan Airlines	2021	10			10	7			7	First delivery 8 August 2018.
30 June 2022	Silk Way West Airlines				4	4					
22 June 2007	Singapore Airlines	2016	65		7	72	65			65	First order was for 20 aircraft. Twenty more added on 13 December 2012. Thirty were added on 30 May 2013. Seven cancelled in July 2015. Seven are A350-900ULRs.
19 June 2013	SriLankan Airlines		4			4					
19 March 2019	Starlux Airlines	2022	9	18	10	37	9	4		13	First delivery 31 October 2022. The first -1000 variant was delivered on 6 January 2026.
11 August 2011	Thai Airways	2017	4			4	4			4	
8 June 2018	Turkish Airlines	2020	90	15	5	110	35			35	A350-900 orders: + 25 A350-900 ordered in 2018 – 5 A350-900 removed from the order in January 2022 + 6 A350-900 meant for Aeroflot purchased in May 2022 + 4 A350-900 ordered in July 2023 + 10 A350-900 ordered in September 2023 + 50 A350-900 ordered in December 2023 with an option for 20 additional A350-900; Other models' orders: + 15 A350-1000 ordered in December 2023 + 5 A350F ordered in December 2023
	Undisclosed		30		8	38					
10 March 2010	United Airlines	2030	45			45					Originally ordered 25 A350-900s for 2016 entry into service. Order was converted to 35 -1000s on 20 June 2013. Order was converted to 45 A350-900s on 6 September 2017.
21 December 2007	Vietnam Airlines	2016	10			10	10			10	
13 June 2016	Virgin Atlantic	2019		6		6		6		6	
13 November 2007	Yemenia		10			10					Deliveries uncertain due to Yemenia suspending all its flights since the Yemeni Civil War began in 2015.
TOTAL			1,136	373	115	1,624	617	120		737	

as of 30 September 2026

=== Orders and deliveries graph ===
as of 30 September 2026

== Operators ==
Operator	First commercial service	Number in service
Aeroflot	6 March 2020	7
Air Caraïbes Atlantique	2 March 2017	7
Air France	27 September 2019	39
Air Mauritius	23 October 2017	4
Air China	14 August 2018	30
Air India	25 December 2023	6
Asiana Airlines	15 May 2017	15
Azul Brazilian Airlines	15 December 2022	Retired
British Airways	5 August 2019	18
Cathay Pacific	1 June 2016	48
China Airlines	30 October 2016	15
China Eastern Airlines	4 December 2018	20
China Southern Airlines	28 June 2019	20
Delta Air Lines	30 October 2017	38
Ethiopian Airlines	2 July 2016	23
Emirates	16 January 2025	16
Etihad Airways	31 March 2022	12
~~Evelop Airlines (defunct)~~	28 March 2019	Retired
Fiji Airways	1 January 2020	4
Finnair	9 October 2015	18
French Bee	23 August 2017	6
Hainan Airlines	13 October 2018	Retired
Hong Kong Airlines	10 September 2017	Retired
Iberia	26 June 2018	22
Iberojet		2
ITA Airways		6
Japan Airlines	13 June 2019	24
Korean Air	27 January 2025	2
LATAM Brasil (formerly TAM)	25 January 2016	Retired
Lufthansa	10 February 2017	30
Malaysia Airlines	8 December 2017	7
Philippine Airlines	21 July 2018	3
Qatar Airways	15 January 2015	60
Scandinavian Airlines	28 January 2020	4
Sichuan Airlines	14 August 2018	9
Singapore Airlines	9 May 2016	65
South African Airways	1 November 2019	Retired
Starlux Airlines	20 January 2023	9
Swiss Air	20 November 2025	3
Thai Airways	4 September 2016	23
Turkish Airlines	28 October 2020	30
Vietnam Airlines	3 July 2015	14
Virgin Atlantic	10 September 2019	9
World2Fly		3
Total		650

== See also ==
- List of Boeing 787 orders and deliveries
- List of Airbus A350 operators
