= Trade and services in Japan =

Japan's service industries, including trade, are the major contributor to gross national product (GNP), generating about 74.1 percent of the national totals in 2004. Moreover, services are the fastest growing sector, outperforming manufacturing. The service sector covers many diverse activities. Wholesale and retail trade was dominant, but advertising, data processing, publishing, tourism, leisure industries, entertainment, and other industries grew rapidly in the 1980s. Most service industries were small and labor-intensive but became more technologically sophisticated as computer and electronic products were incorporated by management.

== Wholesale and retail ==
The trade operations of wholesalers and retailers has often been denigrated by other nations as a barrier to trade, as well as being called antiquated and inefficient. Small retailers and "mom and pop" stores predominated- -in 1985 there were 1.6 million retail outlets in Japan, slightly more than the total number of retail outlets in the United States (1.5 million in 1982), even though Japan has only half the population of the United States and is smaller in size than California. Small businesses are a large voter base of the LDP and had a strong stance in government-business relations. The business situation for non-Japanese companies has improved, though, due to growing experience of foreign firms on the market and more international cooperation in the wake of globalization. The Japanese economic crisis of the 1990s helped, too.

There were several changes in wholesaling and retailing in the 1980s. Japan's distribution system was becoming more efficient. Retail outlets and wholesale establishments both peaked in number in 1982 and then went down 5.4 percent and 3.7 percent, respectively, in 1985. The main casualties were sole proprietorships, especially mom-and-pop stores and wholesale locations with fewer than ten employees. Almost 96,000 of the 1,036,000 mom-and-pop stores in operation in 1982 were out of business three years later. Government estimates for the late 1980s show additional consolidation in both wholesale and retail sectors including a continued sharp decline in mom-and-pop store operations. A further decline in mom-and-pop stores is expected as a result of the Large-Scale Retail Store Law of 1990, which greatly reduced the power of small retailers to block the establishment of large retail stores. Soaring land prices are another major cause of the decline of mom-and-pop stores, but an even more important reason is the growth of convenience and discount stores. Discount stores are not much bigger than the traditional small shops, but their distribution networks gives them a big pricing edge. As of 2005, large chains dominate nearly every market niche be it consumer electronics (notably Yodobashi Camera) or cookies (Aunt Stellas).

In the 1980s, Japanese consumers were discovering the advantages of catalog shopping, which offered not only convenience but also greater selection and lower prices. According to a Nikkei survey, the mail-order business expanded 13 percent between April 1987 and March 1988 alone, to more than US$8.9 billion in annual sales. Specialty chains, particularly those handling men's and women's clothing, shoes, and consumer electronics, were also doing better than the overall industry. Department stores, supermarkets, and superstores (hybrid supermarket-discount stores) and other big retail operations were gaining business at the expense of small retailers, although their progress was quite slow. Between 1980 and 1988, department stores increased their share of total retail sales by only 1 percentage point to 8.4 percent. Supermarkets and superstores increased in market share from 6.5 to 7.3 percent. Between 1980 and 1988, the number of department stores grew from 325 to just 371, and other big self-service stores only increased in number by 62 units between 1984 and 1988.

The late 1990s brought a decline of the catalog mail order in favor of online shopping.

== Service industries ==
Among service industries, the restaurant, advertising, real estate, hotel and leisure business, and data-processing industries grew rapidly in the 1980s. The fast-food industry has been profitable for both foreign and domestic companies. By 1989 family restaurants and fast-food chains had grown into a US$138 billion business per year. Overall growth declined in the late 1980s because of the sharp rise of rents and a proliferation of restaurants in many areas. The number of hotel and guest rooms grew from 189,654 in 1981 to peak at 342,695 in 1988, and has been falling again since.

This fact is based on tertiary sector services.

== Advertising ==
Because much of the sales competition in Japan is of the nonprice variety, advertising is extremely important. Consumers have to see the suitability of products and services for their lifestyles. The intense competition for the domestic market spurs the growth of the world's largest advertising agency, Dentsu, as well as other advertisers. A lot of the advertising effort goes into brand development, as Japanese consumers are very conscious about brand names. Brands are seen as a means of identification and a guarantee for quality. The Japanese consumer market is also one of the fastest in the world, and companies are constantly struggling to come up with new products, which is also an advertisement effort.
