= Intrepid Aviation (company) =

International aircraft leasing company

- Company type: Private
- Industry: Aviation Leasing
- Founded: 1994
- Founder: Ron Anderson
- Headquarters: Stamford, Connecticut, United States
- Key people: Doug Winter, CEO; Michael Lungariello, CFO; Brian Rynott, CIO; Daniel Perez, COO; Thomas Schmid, General Counsel
- Services: Commercial Aircraft Leasing
- Website: Official website

Intrepid Aviation is a commercial aircraft leasing company primarily focused on young, modern, fuel-efficient wide-body aircraft and larger narrowbody aircraft. It has offices based in Dublin, Ireland and Stamford, Connecticut, United States.

Its current portfolio consists of aircraft such as the Airbus A330, Airbus A321, Boeing 777-300ER and Boeing 787 Dreamliner. Intrepid has purchase commitments from Boeing for six 777-300ER aircraft. It is owned by Centerbridge Partners and Reservoir Capital Group.

== History ==
Intrepid Aviation was founded by Ron Anderson, a 20-year employee of FedEx, in 1994 and was originally based in Memphis, Tennessee. The company started by buying used passenger aircraft and having them converted into cargo aircraft for leasing. In 2007, Intrepid placed an order for 20 Airbus A330-200 freighter aircraft. During the 2008 financial crisis, Intrepid had to negotiate delaying deliveries by three years.

The company subsequently reconstituted its management team and relocated its corporate headquarters to Stamford, CT. In 2014, the company filed for an IPO with a fundraising target of $150 million. The company currently has equity commitments of up to $650 million from existing shareholders., and raised $215 and $120 million in bonds on 2014 and 2015, respectively. In August 2015, Olaf Sachau was appointed as its CEO and Doug Winter as its President.

In 2023, Voyager Aviation Holdings, the rebranded name for Intrepid Aviation, filed for Chapter 11 bankruptcy protection with plans to sell its assets to Azorra Aviation Holdings for up to $743.5 million.

== Fleet ==
The Intrepid Aviation fleet includes passenger aircraft such as the Airbus A330-300, Airbus A330-200, Airbus A321-200, Boeing 777-300ER and Boeing 787-8 Dreamliner. As of December 31, 2015, Intrepid had 29 aircraft in its fleet.

The company has 13 airline customers in 11 different countries, including Alitalia, Air Namibia, Asiana Airlines, LOT Polish Airlines, China Airlines, Air France, Thai Airways, Sichuan Airlines, Philippine Airlines, EVA Air, Cebu Pacific, and Ethiopian Airlines. Turkish Airlines will become a new customer later in 2016.
