= List of Boeing 787 orders and deliveries =

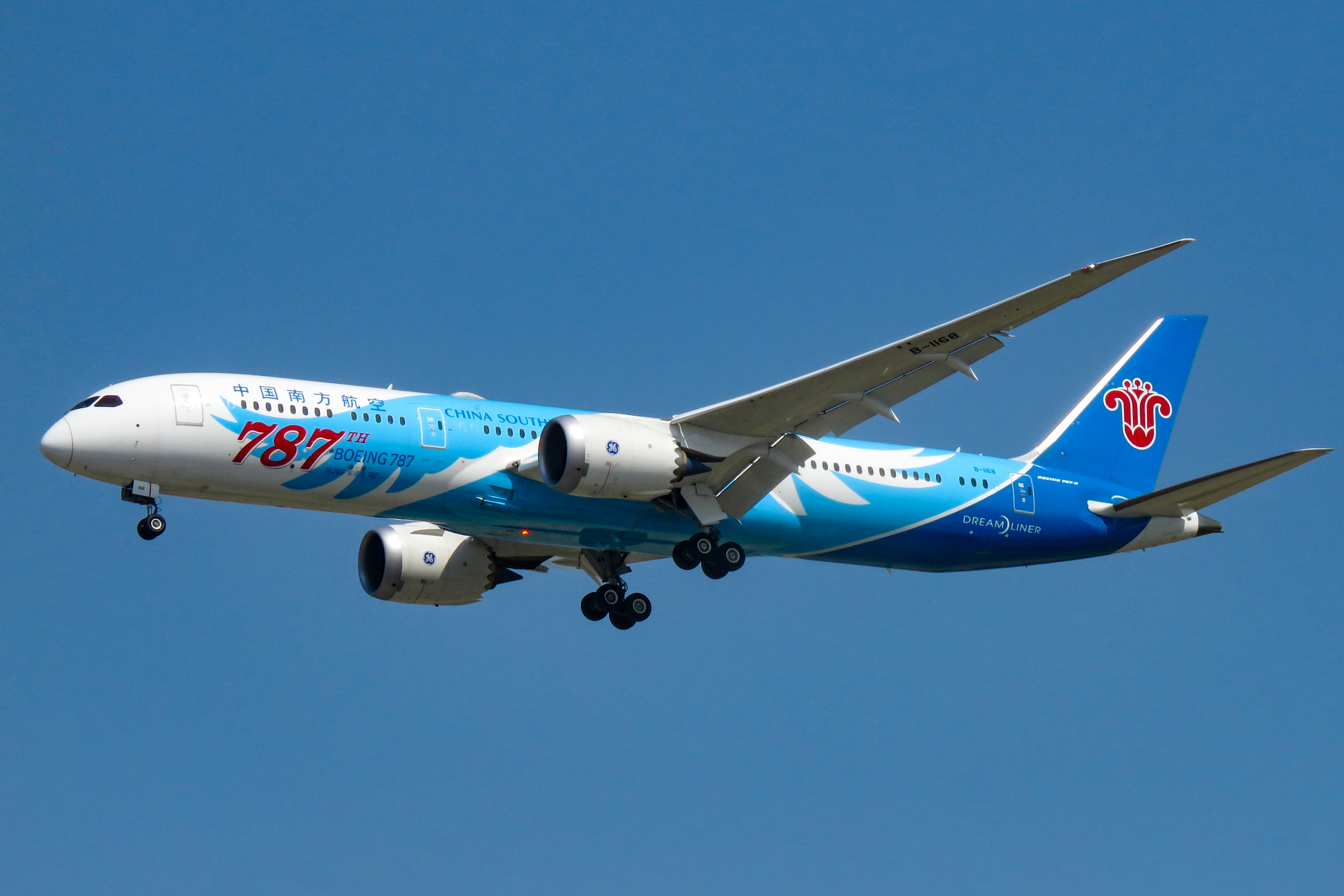
The 787th Boeing 787 Dreamliner produced for and operated by China Southern Airlines

This article lists the orders and deliveries for the Boeing 787 Dreamliner. As of September 2026, the largest airline order is by United Airlines for 221 aircraft. (Note: The data used throughout this page show the entities credited by Boeing with a 'firm contractual commitment' for the ordered airframes. Because of financing and leasing arrangements as well as after-market resales, this may not correspond to the airline operating the airframes. Press releases and the resulting media coverage may differ from these numbers if they report the operator rather than the leasing company contractually taking delivery, or if they report orders that lack the level of firm contractual commitment represented by these data.)

== Orders and deliveries ==
=== Orders and deliveries by type and year ===
Boeing 787 orders and deliveries by type
	Total orders	Total deliveries	Unfilled
787‑8	424	400	24
787‑9	1,493	777	716
787‑10	587	145	442
Total	2,504	1,322	1,182

Boeing 787 net orders and deliveries by year
		2004	2005	2006	2007	2008	2009	2010	2011	2012	2013	2014	2015	2016	2017	2018	2019	2020
Net orders		56	235	157	369	93	−59	−4	13	−12	182	41	71	58	94	109	82	20
Deliveries	787‑8	–	–	–	–	–	–	–	3	46	65	104	71	35	26	10	10	5
Deliveries	787‑9	–	–	–	–	–	–	–	–	–	–	10	64	102	110	120	114	36
Deliveries	787‑10	–	–	–	–	–	–	–	–	–	–	–	–	–	–	15	34	12
Deliveries	Total	–	–	–	–	–	–	–	3	46	65	114	135	137	136	145	158	53

		2021	2022	2023	2024	2025	2026	Total
Net orders		−11	114	301	48	368	179	2,504
Deliveries	787‑8	2	9	10	1	2	1	400
Deliveries	787‑9	12	10	40	29	67	63	777
Deliveries	787‑10	–	12	23	21	19	9	145
Deliveries	Total	14	31	73	51	88	73	1,322

Boeing 787 orders and deliveries (cumulative, by year):

Orders Deliveries — as of October 2026

=== Orders and deliveries sortable, presorted by customer ===
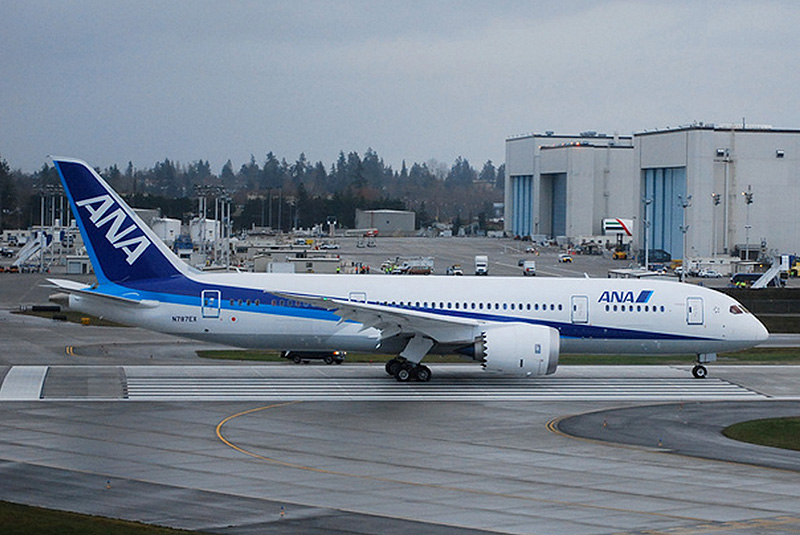
All Nippon Airways launched the 787 Dreamliner program with an order for 50 aircraft in 2004.

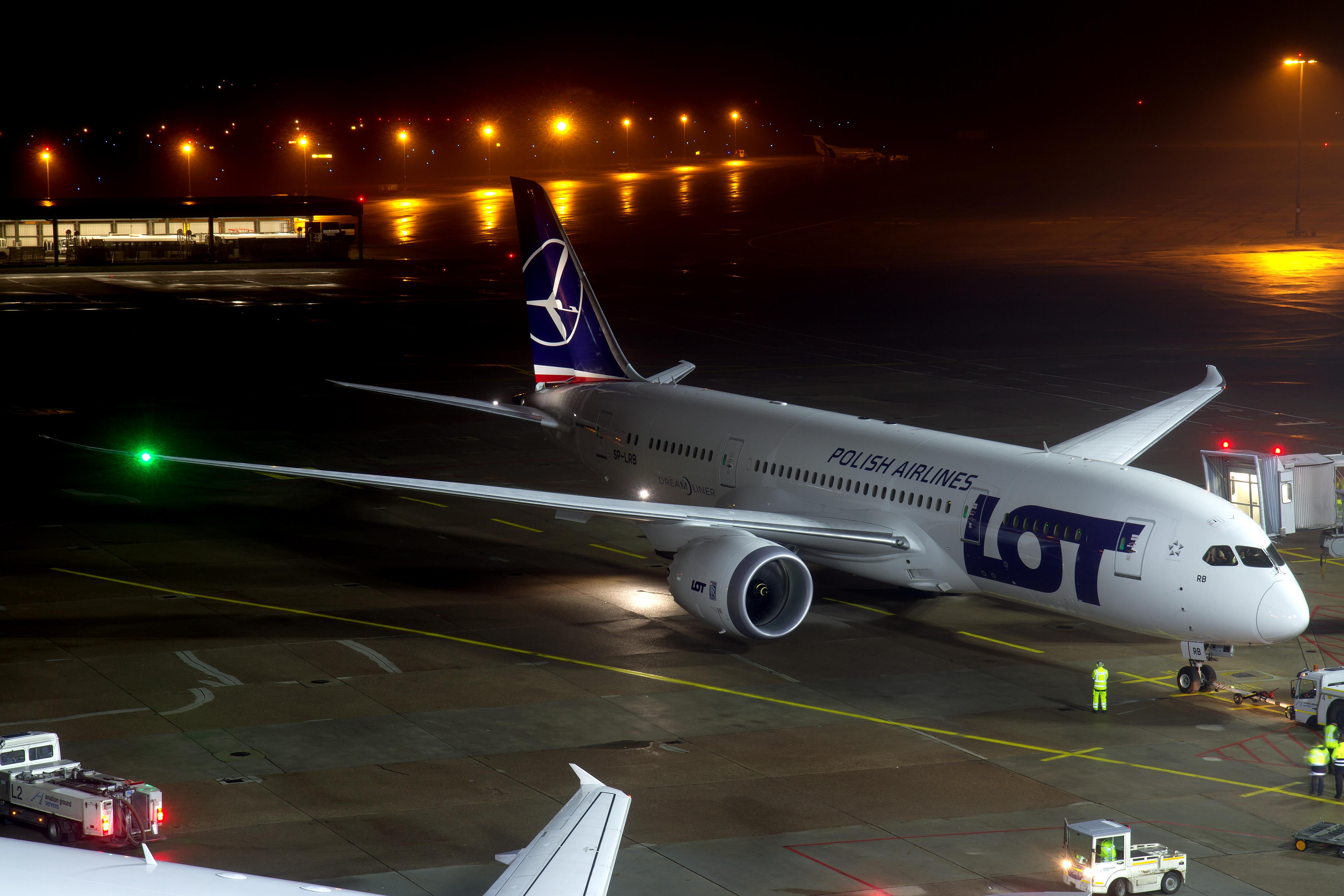
A 787-8 of LOT Polish Airlines, the first European operator

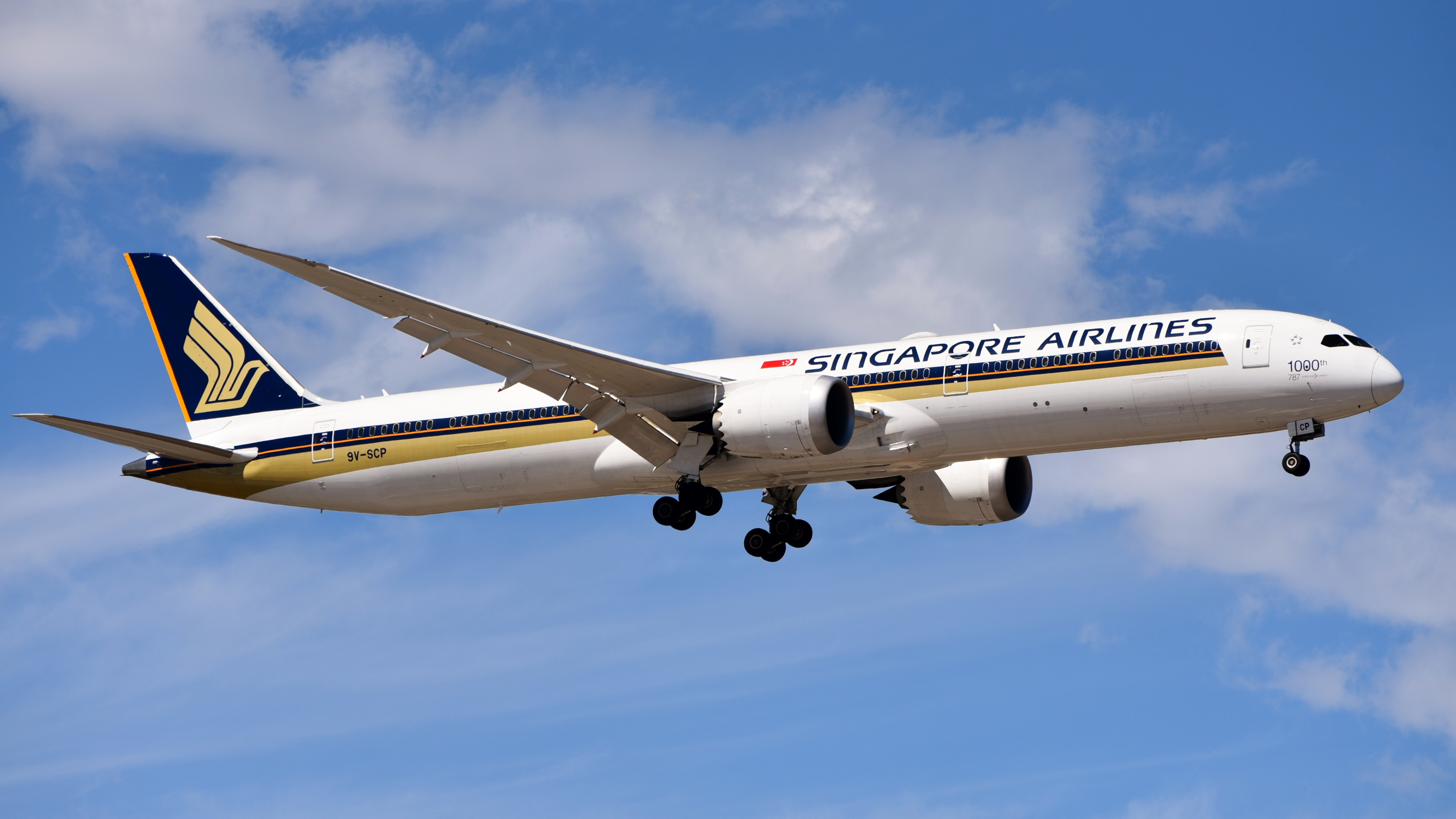
The 1,000th 787, 9V-SCP, was delivered to Singapore Airlines in 2023.

Customer	Orders							Deliveries					
Customer	787‑8	787‑9	787‑10	Total	GE	RR	NS	787‑8	787‑9	787‑10	Total	GE	RR
AerCap		50		50	20	15	15		29		29	16	13
Aeroméxico	2	6		8	*			2	6		8	*	
Air Astana	3	5		8		3	5						
Air Austral	2			2		*		2			2		*
Air Canada	8	32	14	54	*			8	32		40	*	
Air China		14		14		*			14		14		*
Air Europa	8	2		10		*		8	2		10		*
Air France–KLM		11	15	26	*				11	15	26	*	
Air India	27	20		47	*			27	4		31	*	
Air Lease Corporation		30	18	48	40	8			30	18	48	40	8
Air New Zealand		17	5	22	10	12			12		12		*
Air Tahiti Nui		2		2	*				2		2	*	
Air Tanzania	3			3	*			3			3		*
Alaska Airlines		5		5			*						
All Nippon Airways	36	49	11	96	13	83		36	45	11	92	12	80
American Airlines	37	52		89	*			37	33		70	*	
Arik Air		9		9			*						
Avianca	13	1		14		*		13	1		14		*
Aviation Capital Group		5		5		*			5		5		*
Avolon		4		4		*			4		4		*
Azerbaijan Airlines	2	8		10	*			2			2	*	
Bamboo Airways		10		10			*						
Biman Bangladesh Airlines	4	4	13	21	6		15	4	2		6	*	
BOC Aviation		10		10		*			10		10		*
BoComm Leasing		2		2	*				2		2	*	
Boeing Capital		2		2	*								
British Airways	12	18	50	80	38	42		12	18	12	42		*
Business Jet / VIP Customer(s)	6	4		10	7	3		6	4		10	7	3
CALC Aircraft Assets		2		2	*				2		2	*	
China Airlines		18	6	24	*								
China Eastern Airlines		18		18	*				18		18	*	
China Southern Airlines	10	14		24	*			10	14		24	*	
CIT Leasing Corporation	4	12		16	9	7		4	12		16	9	7
Delta Air Lines			30	30	*								
El Al	4	10	4	18		9	9	4	5		9		*
Emirates	15		15	30	*								
Ethiopian Airlines	16	26		42	36	6		16			16	10	6
Etihad Airways		41	29	70	*				37	10	47	*	
EVA Air		13	15	28	24		4		5	11	16	*	
flydubai		30		30	*								
GECAS		2		2	*				2		2	*	
Gulf Air		27		27	2	10	15		10		10		*
Hainan Airlines	10	24		34	*			10	24		34	*	
Hawaiian Airlines		5	5	10	8		2		5		5	*	
ILFC	23	51		74	34	40		23	51		74	34	40
Japan Airlines	31	32		63	*			31	22		53	*	
Juneyao Airlines		10		10	*				10		10	*	
Kenya Airways	9			9	*			9			9	*	
Korean Air	1	20	55	76	*			1	14	8	23	*	
LATAM Airlines Group	10	27		37	10	22	5	10	12		22		*
LOT Polish Airlines	8			8		*		8			8		*
Lufthansa		49		49	12	27	10		19		22	5	17
MG Aviation		4		4		*			4		4		*
Norwegian Air Shuttle	3	8		11		*		3	8		11		*
Okay Airways		5		5			*						
Oman Air	2	8		10	*			2	2		4	*	
Philippine Airlines			15	15	*								
PrivatAir	1			1		*		1			1		*
Qantas Group	11	18	8	37	*			11	14		25	*	
Qatar Airways	30	85	75	190	*			30	29		59	*	
Republic of Iraq	2	5		7	*								
Riyadh Air		39		39	*				7		7	*	
Royal Air Maroc	5	6		11	*			5	6		11	*	
Royal Brunei Airlines	5	4		9		5	4	5			5		*
Royal Jordanian	3	6		9	*			3			3	*	
Ruili Airlines		6		6			*						
Saudia		26	29	55	*				8	8	16	*	
Scoot	13	11		24		*		13	11		24		*
Singapore Airlines			31	31		*				28	28		*
SMBC Aviation Capital		6		6	*				2		2	*	
Sun PhuQuoc Airways		20		20			*						
TAAG Angola Airlines		2	2	4	*				2	2	4	*	
Thai Airways		30	15	45	*								
TUI Travel	13	6		19	*			13	6		19	*	
Turkish Airlines		65	15	80	*				27		27	*	
Unidentified Customer(s)	4	91	35	130	107	8	15		5		5	*	
United Airlines	12	132	77	221	*			12	62	21	95	*	
Uzbekistan Airways	7	22		29	7		22	7			7	*	
Vietnam Airlines		8		8	*				8		8	*	
Virgin Atlantic		17		17		*			17		17		*
Vistara		6		6	*				6		6	*	
WestJet		16		16	7		9		7		7	*	
Xiamen Airlines	6	6		12	*			6	6		12	*	
Total	424	1,493	572	2,489	1,847	461	181	399	768	144	1,31	883	428

Data through September 2026

=== Orders and deliveries graph ===
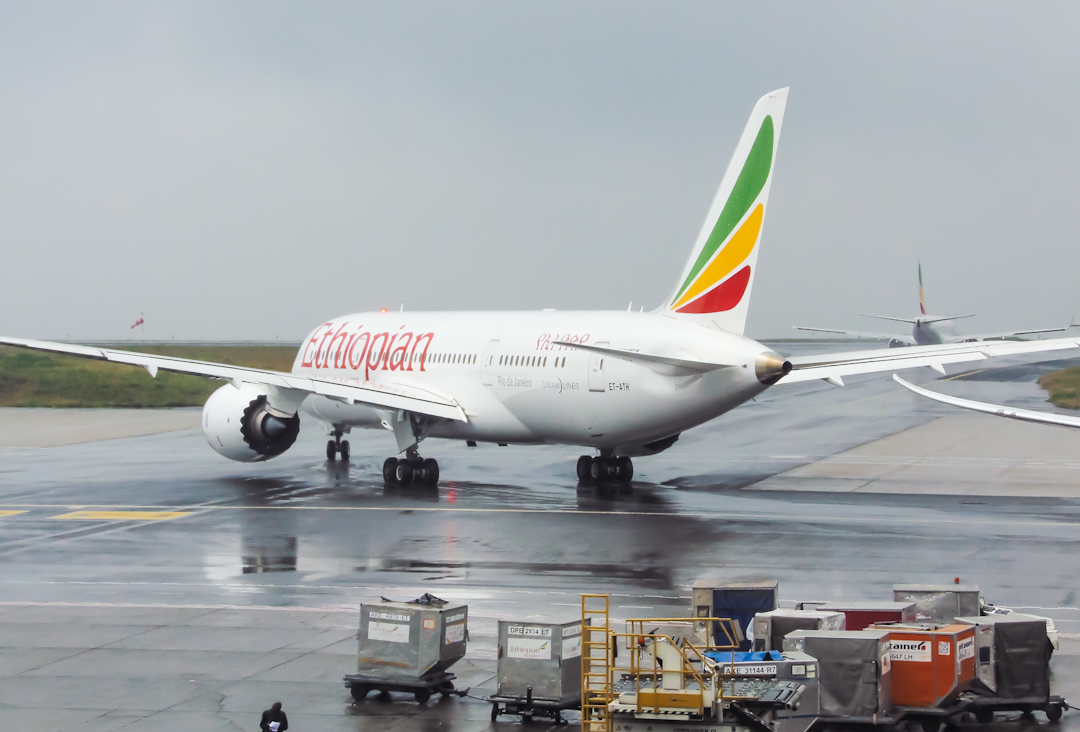
Ethiopian Airlines is the largest African operator of the 787.

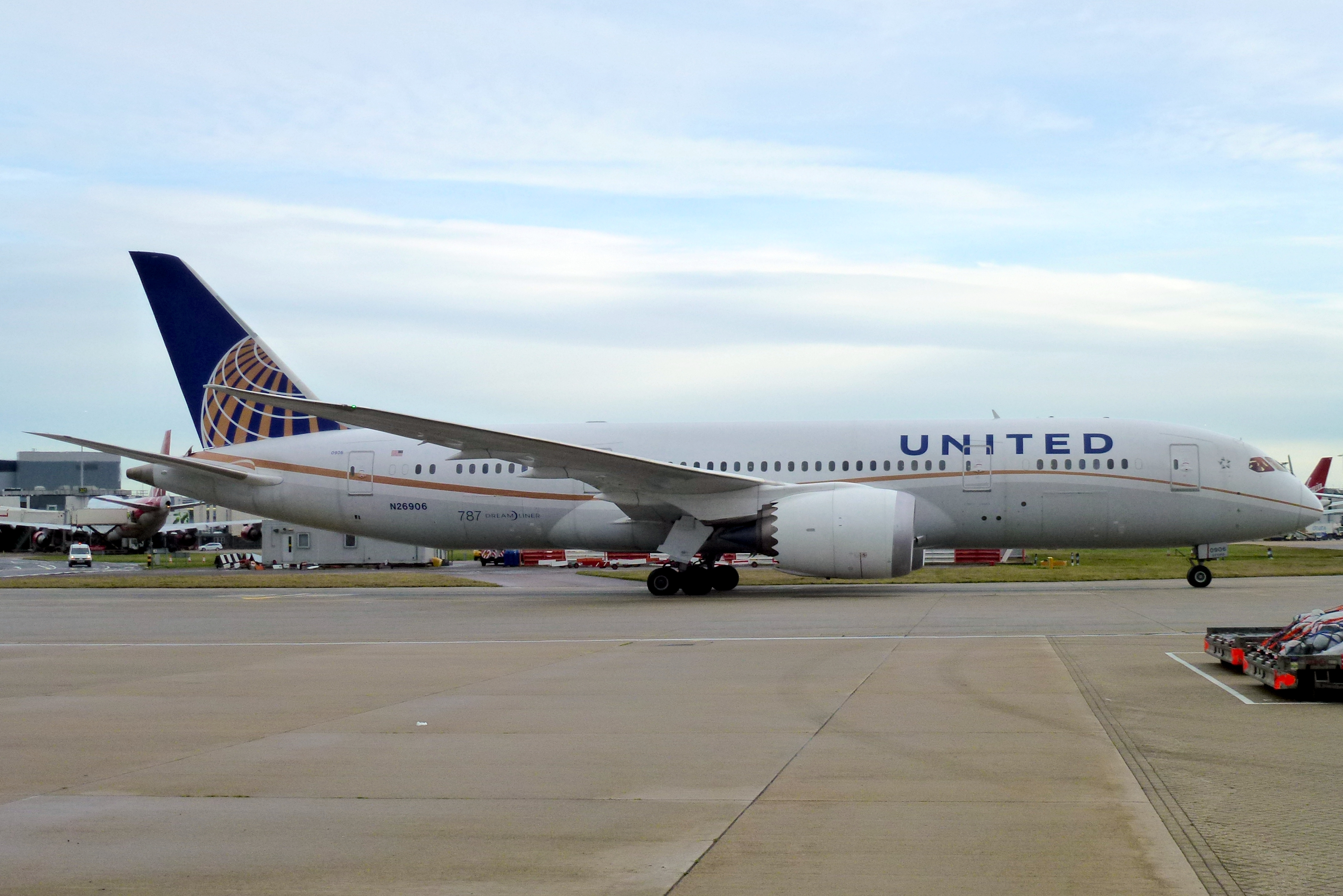
United Airlines was the first North American operator of the 787-8.

Data through September 2026

== See also ==
- List of Airbus A350 orders and deliveries
- List of Boeing 787 operators
