= Silk Way West Airlines =

Azerbaijani cargo airline

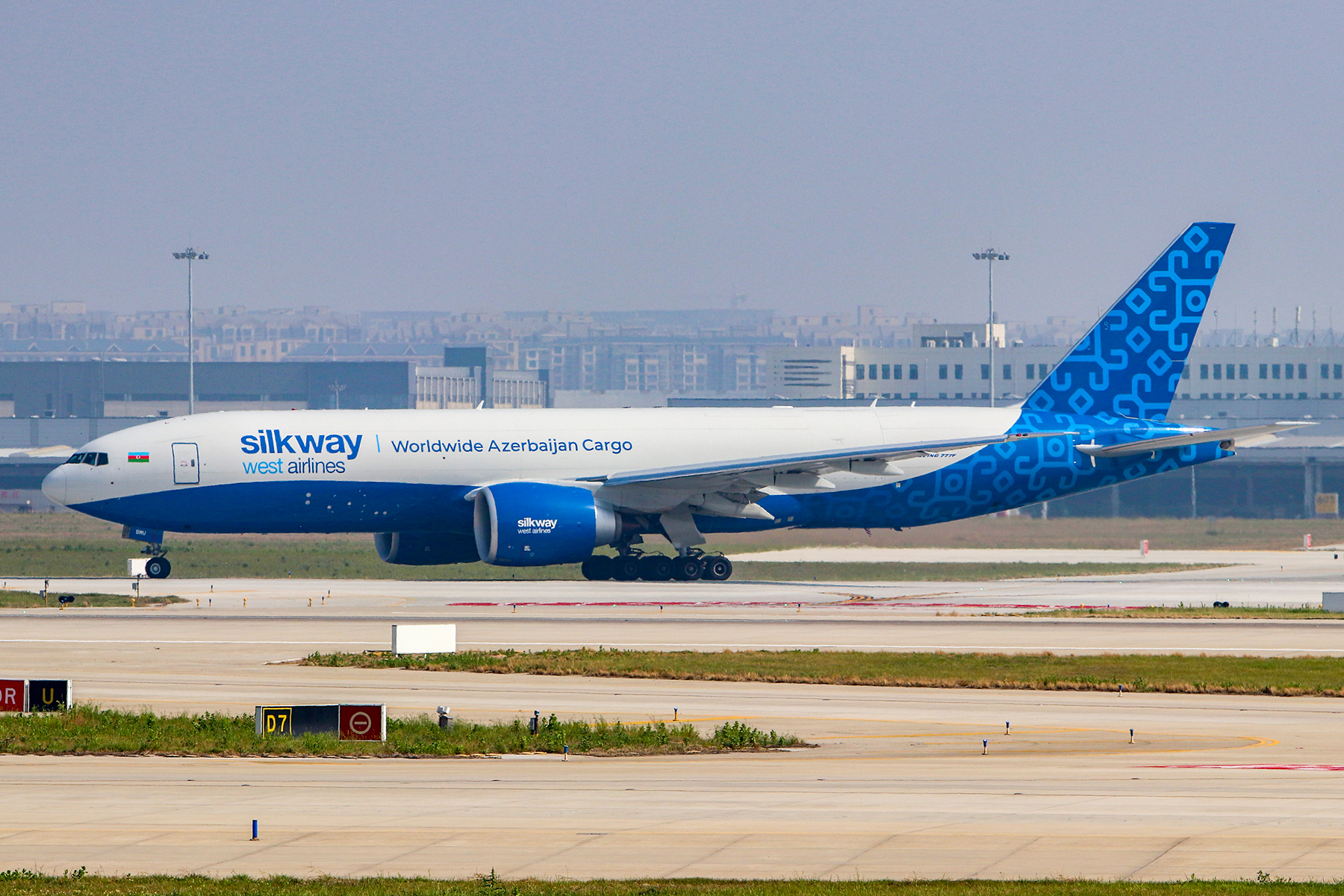
- Boeing 777-F
| IATA | ICAO | Call sign |
|---|---|---|
| 7L | AZG | SILK WEST |
- Founded: 2012; 14 years ago
- AOC #: 7KWF434F
- Operating bases: Heydar Aliyev International Airport
- Subsidiaries: SW Technics
- Fleet size: 12
- Destinations: 45
- Parent company: Silk Way Group
- Headquarters: Baku, Azerbaijan
- Revenue: ▲US$1,135,654,117 (2023)
- Operating income: ▼US$120,363,529 (2023)
- Net income: ▼US$48,267,058 (2023)
- Total assets: ▲US$1,788,512,352 (2023)
- Total equity: ▲US$913,009,999 (2023)
- Website: silkwaywest.com

Notes
- Financials As of 31 December 2023. Reference

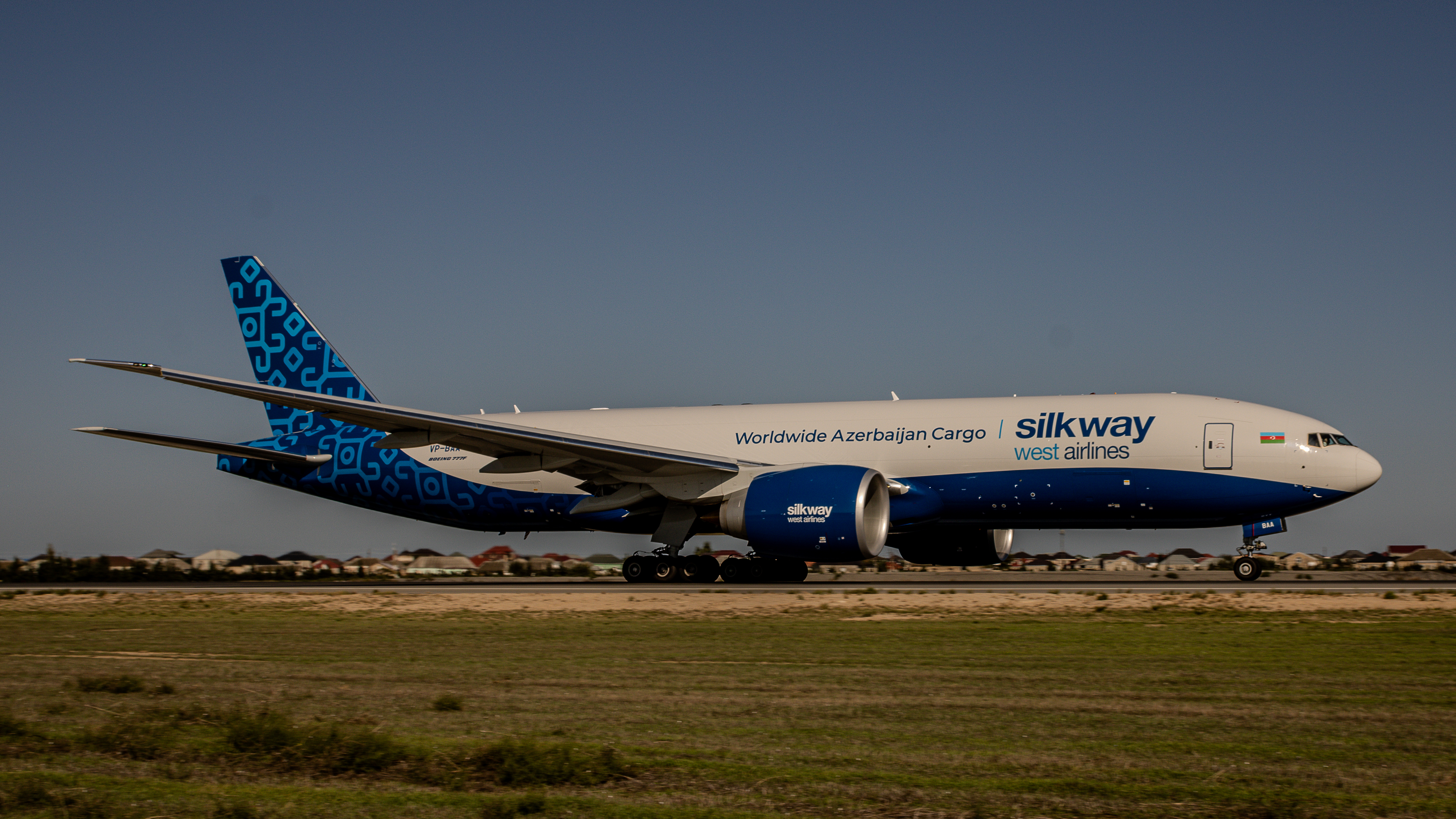
A Boeing 777-F

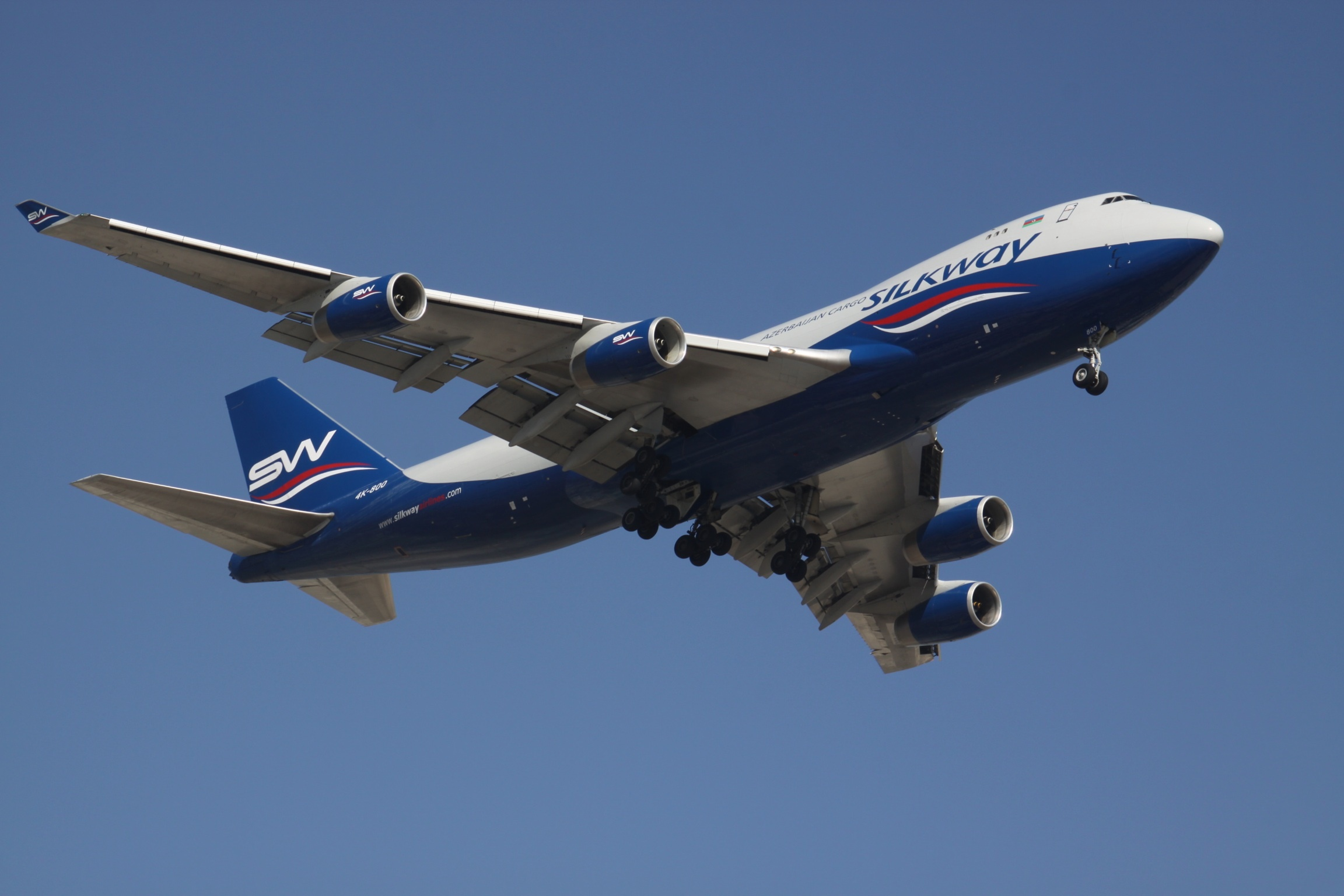
A Boeing 747-400F

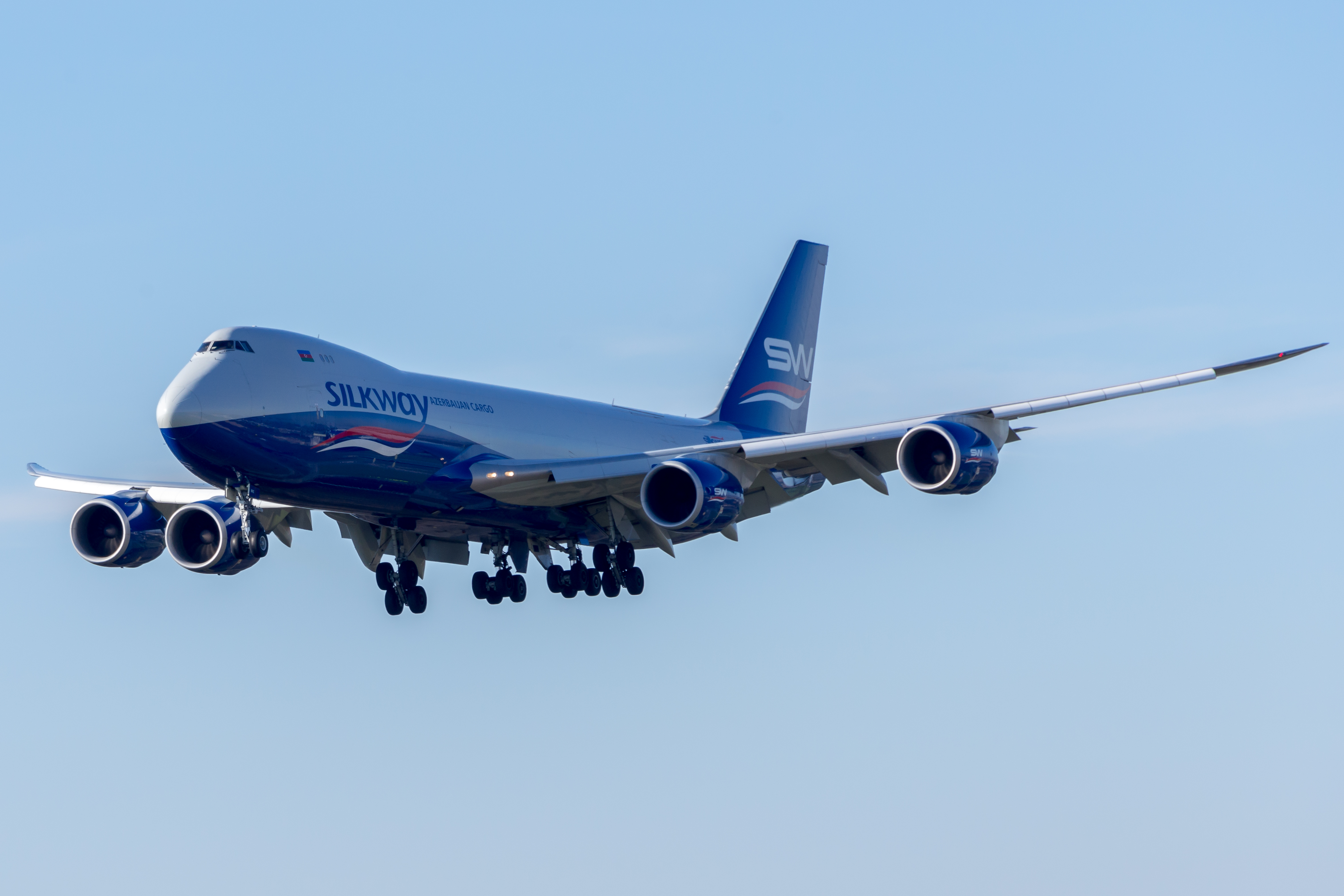
A Boeing 747-8F

Silk Way West Airlines is an Azerbaijani cargo airline with its head office and main operating base at Heydar Aliyev International Airport in Baku, Azerbaijan. It is a subsidiary of the Silk Way Group along with sister airline, Silk Way Airlines. Silk Way West Airlines won the ‘Cargo Airline of the Year’ award from South Korea’s Incheon International Airport in 2020.

== History ==
Founded in June 2012 in Baku, Silk Way West Airlines is the largest cargo airline in the Caspian Sea region. The carrier is a part of Silk Way Group, which also includes Silk Way Airlines, and Silk Way Technics. Based at Heydar Aliyev International Airport, the airline operates around 350 monthly flights across the globe via its fleet of dedicated Boeing 777F, 747-8F and 747-400F aircraft. The airline's annual cargo turnover exceeds 420,000 tons, while its growing route network covers over 40 destinations across Europe, the CIS, the Middle East, Central and Eastern Asia, and North and South America.

=== Events and developments ===
On April 28, 2021, Silk Way West Airlines signed a strategic fleet expansion agreement with Boeing for five Boeing 777 Freighters. Two more Boeing 747-400F aircraft were received in March 2022. On 28 June 2022, Silkway West also signed an agreement with Airbus for 2 Airbus A350F aircraft, with an expected entry into service in 2027. The aircraft will be registered in Bermuda.

In December 2022, Silk Way West Airlines and Nippon Express Holdings signed an Air Cargo Memorandum of Understanding (MoU) to enhance their air freight solutions and adapt to evolving supply chain demands. This agreement aims to strengthen Silk Way West Airlines' presence in the Japanese market and assist Nippon Express Holdings in expanding its global operations by providing cargo capacity across an extensive network. Since 2018, Silk Way West Airlines has been serving the Japanese air cargo market with weekly flights connecting Baku to Kansai International Airport. Additionally, the airline has been offering regular flights to Narita International Airport, a major air cargo gateway in Japan, since 2021. The new MoU is expected to enhance Silk Way West Airlines' role in the region's freight network, improving air cargo transportation services for both Japanese and international partners.

Silk Way West Airlines hosted Caspian Air Cargo Summit 2023 in JW Marriott Absheron Hotel, Baku, Azerbaijan during October. It hosted around 400 delegates from over 40 nations, including government ministers, industry managers, and logisticians. It focused on current trends, issues, and future opportunities of airfreight companies. Key representatives from leading companies in the global air cargo industry such as Boeing, Airbus, Embraer, The International Air Cargo Association (TIACA), Turkish Airlines, Rolls-Royce, GE Aerospace, ACL Airshop, Alibaba Group, Kales Group, Dnata, Hong Kong Air Cargo Terminals Limited (Hactl) and others shared valuable information and insights regarding the future cargo aircraft and next-generation engine, and discussed issues on sustainability and innovation in logistics and supply chains, with a special focus on the growing role of e-commerce in logistics and air cargo.

Silk Way West Airlines and China Henan Aviation Group (CHAGC) signed a Memorandum of Understanding (MoU) in Shanghai in June 2024 during the Air Cargo China event to enhance air cargo connectivity between Zhengzhou and Baku. The innovative partnership is suggested to establish a dual-hub model connecting the Asia-Pacific region to Europe, America, and Africa. Jenny Zhao, Vice President APAC at Silk Way West Airlines, further stated that the partnership would bring additional capacity and cargo volume in Zhengzhou with quality ground support and additional collaboration under the Belt and Road Initiative.

Silk Way West Airlines, in August 2024, announced a corporate social responsibility initiative for the educational infrastructure development of the nation. The airline is sponsoring the construction and renovation of six Azerbaijani schools and benefiting over 4,500 students in terms of education. President of Silk Way Group Zaur Akhundov emphasized the company's dedication to the community, highlighting that the implementation of such projects shows their commitment to social responsibility and the life-saving nature of education. Minister of Science and Education of Azerbaijan Emin Amrullayev talked about the importance of public-private partnership in the development of the country's educational infrastructure. He further stated that collaboration with Silk Way West Airlines not only strengthens physical infrastructure but also offers an environment conducive to student success.

== Destinations ==
Silk Way West Airlines operates cargo flights to 45 destinations in Europe, Asia and North America. In October 2018, the company announced it would launch a twice-weekly freighter service from its hub in Baku to Tianjin in China. In August 2023, direct flights from Baku to Los Angeles were announced.

== Fleet ==
As of August 2025, Silk Way West Airlines operates the following aircraft:

Silk Way West Airlines fleet
| Aircraft | In service | Orders | Notes |
|---|---|---|---|
| Airbus A350F | — | 4 | Deliveries from 2027. Exercised purchase option of two in November 2025 |
| Boeing 747-400F | 5 | — | |
| Boeing 747-8F | 5 | — | |
| Boeing 777F | 3 | 3 | |
| Boeing 777-8F | — | 2 | Order with 2 options. Deliveries from 2027. |
| Total | 13 | 9 | |

The additional fleet of Ilyushin Il-76 cargo aircraft is operated by sister company Silk Way Airlines.
