= Boeing 777X =

Next generation of the Boeing 777

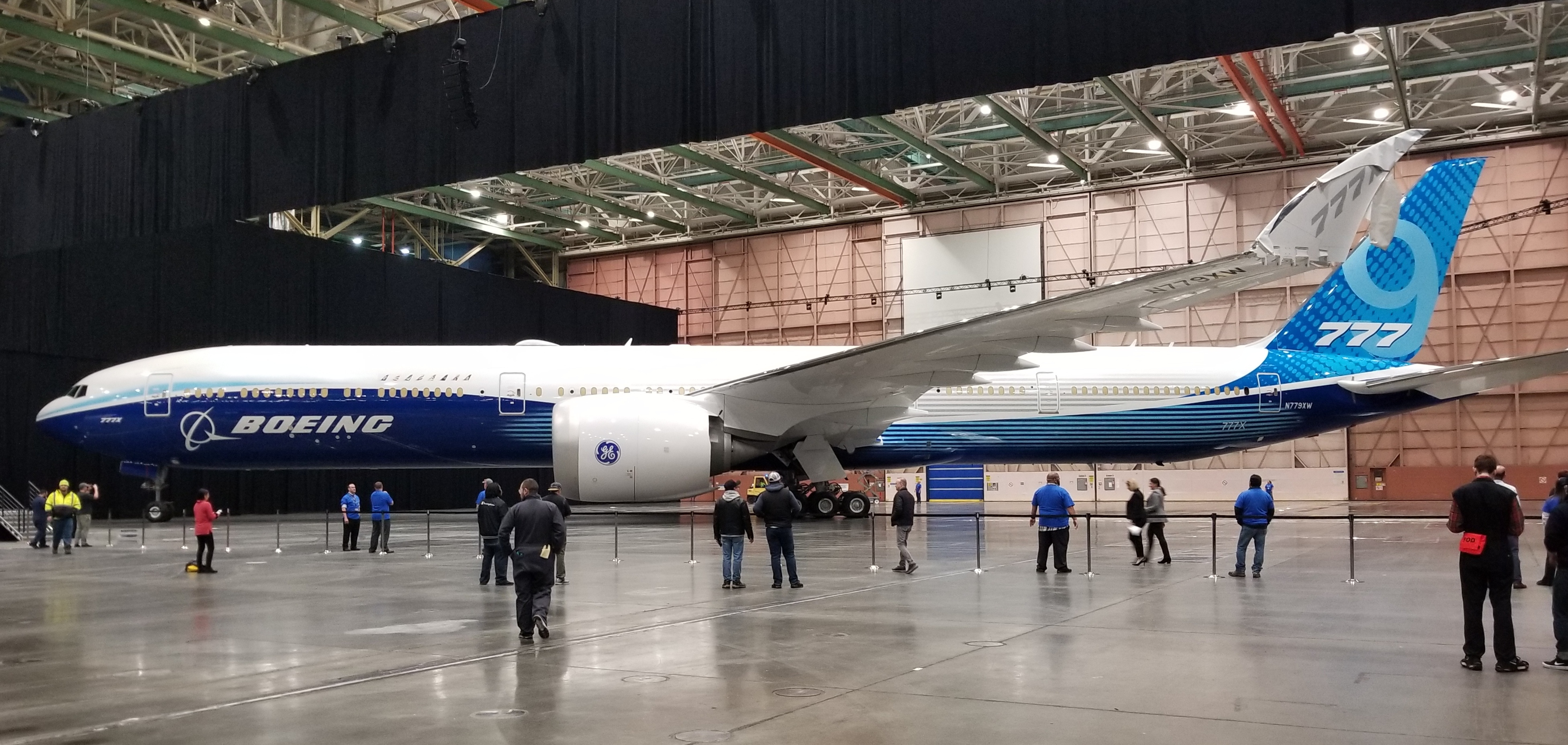
- The prototype 777-9 rolling out in 2019

General information
- Type: Wide-body jet airliner
- National origin: United States
- Manufacturer: Boeing Commercial Airplanes
- Status: In flight testing
- Number built: 7 (as of July 2026)

History
- Manufactured: 2017–present
- Introduction date: 2027
- First flight: January 25, 2020; 6 years ago
- Developed from: Boeing 777

The Boeing 777X is an American long-range, wide-body, twin-engine airliner built by Boeing Commercial Airplanes, undergoing flight testing as of 2026. A substantial development from the original Boeing 777, changes for the 777X include General Electric GE9X engines, composite wings with folding wingtips, greater cabin width and seating capacity, and technologies from the Boeing 787 Dreamliner. The 777X program was launched in November 2013 to develop two variants: the 777-8 and the 777-9. The 777-8 provides seating for 350 to 425 passengers and has a range of 9,500 nautical miles [nmi] (17,600 km; 10,900 mi), while the 777-9 has seating for 375 to 450 passengers and a range of 8,000 nmi (15,000 km; 9,200 mi).

The aircraft are assembled at the Boeing Everett Factory. The 777-9 first flew on January 25, 2020. The program has suffered numerous delays; as of October 2025, Boeing expects the first aircraft to be delivered in 2027. As of November 2025, there are 619 total orders for the 777X passenger and freighter versions from 12 customers.

The first 777X is expected to be delivered in 2027, with Boeing conducting a first-of-model test flight using Lufthansa's 777X passenger configuration in May 2026.

== Development ==
=== Initial design ===
In 2011, Boeing refined its response to the revamped Airbus A350 XWB with three improved 777 models, targeting a firm configuration in 2015, first flight in late 2017 or 2018, and entering service by 2019. The then-proposed, 407–passenger 777-9X stretched the 777-300ER by four frames to 250 ft 11 in (76.48 m) in length, for a 759,000 lb (344 t) maximum take-off weight (MTOW). It would have been powered by 99,500 lbf (443 kN) engines, targeting per-seat 21% better fuel burn and 16% better operating cost. Early designs of the smaller 353-seat 777-8X proposed stretching the 777-200ER by ten frames to a length of 228 ft 2 in (69.55 m), with a 694,000 lb (315 t) MTOW and 88,000 lbf (390 kN) turbofans to compete with the A350-900. An 8LX version with the 9X's MTOW would have had a range of 9,480 nmi (17,560 km; 10,910 mi). The current 777-200LR/300ER has a 775,000 lb (352 t) MTOW.

The proposals also included a carbon-fiber-reinforced polymer (CFRP) wing with a wingspan of 213 or 225 ft; 2,560 or 2,700 in (65 or 68.6 m) with blended winglets, or up to 233 ft 5 in (71.1 m) with raked wingtip would have provided for a 10% larger wing area. The aircraft would have fallen into ICAO aerodrome code F like the 747-8 and Airbus A380 but with 22 ft 6 in (6.9 m) folding wingtips would stay within the 213 ft 4 in (65.02 m) code E like current 777s. The horizontal stabilizers also were extended.

=== Engine selection ===
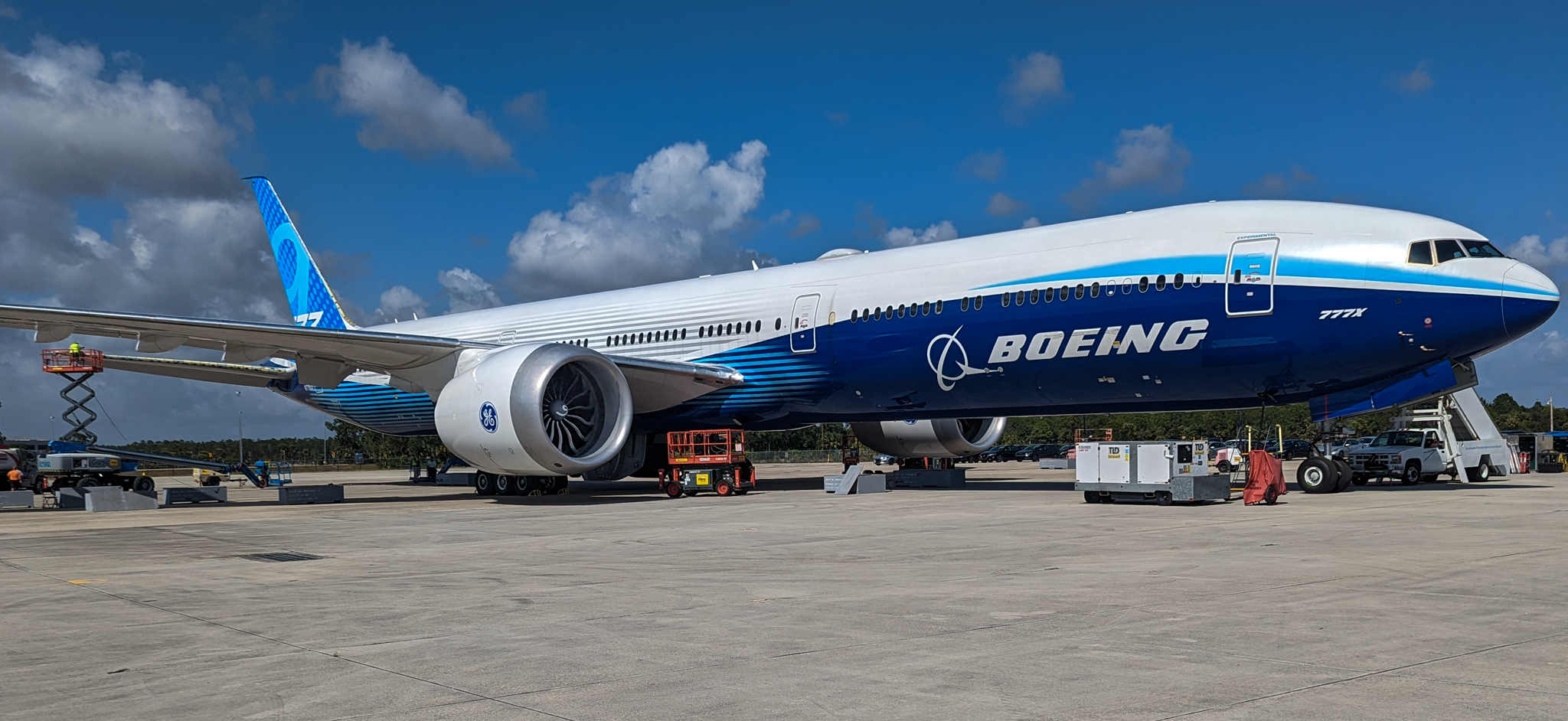
777-9 prototype with its GE9X engines at Southwest Florida International Airport

The General Electric GE90-115B of the earlier 777-200LR and -300ER variants has a 42:1 overall pressure ratio and 23:1 HP compressor ratio. Rolls-Royce Plc proposed its RB3025 concept with a 132 in (335 cm) fan diameter, a 12:1 bypass ratio, and a 62:1 overall pressure ratio, targeting a fuel burn of more than 10% lower than the GE90-115B and 15% lower than its Trent 800 powering the 777; the RB3025 concept has a composite fan, a core derived from the Trent 1000, and advanced HP materials. Pratt & Whitney responded with the 100,000 lbf (440 kN) thrust PW1000G geared turbofan architecture. GE Aviation proposed the GE9X with a 128 in (325 cm) diameter fan, a 10:1 bypass ratio, a 60:1 overall pressure ratio, and 27:1 HP compressor ratio for a 10% fuel burn reduction.

In March 2013, Boeing selected the GE9X with a 132 in (335 cm) fan. It is the largest fan made by GE. In the rest of 2013, thrust was bumped to 102,000 and 105,000 lbf (450 and 470 kN) to support the MTOW growing from 769,413 to 775,000 lb (349,000 to 351,534 kg) and increasing the payload-range, with a possible 108,000 lbf (480 kN) envisioned.

Some customers bemoaned the loss of engine competition, like Air Lease Corporation's CEO Steven Udvar-Hazy who wanted a choice of engines. Airbus pointed out that handling more than one engine type adds millions of dollars to an airliner cost. Pratt and Whitney said: "Engines are no longer commodities...the optimization of the engine and the aircraft becomes more relevant."

=== Launch ===
In 2012, with the Boeing 737 MAX in development and the 787-10 launch in preparation, Boeing decided to slow 777X development to reduce risk with introduction still forecast for 2019. On May 1, 2013, Boeing's board of directors approved selling the 353-seat 777-8LX to replace the 777-300ER from 2021, after the larger 406-seat -9X.

The design work was distributed between Charleston, Huntsville, Long Beach, Philadelphia, and St. Louis in the U.S. and Moscow, Russia. Its development cost was expected to exceed $5 billion with at least $2 billion for the carbon-composite wing.

On September 18, 2013, Lufthansa became its launch customer by selecting 34 Boeing 777-9X airliners, along with 25 Airbus A350-900s to replace its 22 747-400s and 48 A340-300/600s for its long-haul fleet. At the November 2013 Dubai Airshow, the -8X for 350 passengers over a 9,300 nmi (17,200 km; 10,700 mi) range and the -9X, seating more than 400 over 8,200 nmi (15,200 km; 9,400 mi) were launched with 259 orders and commitments for US$95 billion (~$129 billion in 2025) at list prices. This was the largest commercial aircraft launch by dollar value with Emirates ordering 150, Qatar Airways 50, and Etihad Airways 25, in addition to the September 2013 Lufthansa commitment for 34 aircraft. Boeing dropped the variants' "X" suffix, while keeping the 777X program name at the 2015 Dubai Airshow.

=== Production ===
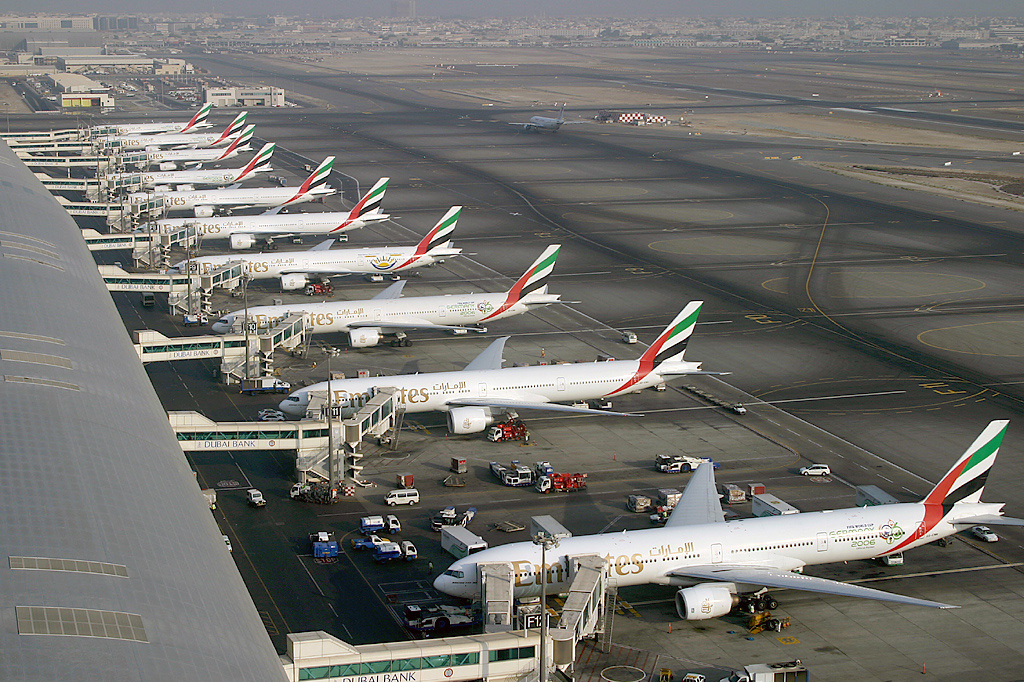
A row of Boeing 777-300s and -300ERs of Emirates, its largest operator, at Dubai International Airport

In December 2014, Boeing began construction on a 367,000 sq ft (34,100 m^{2}) composites facility in St. Louis to be completed in 2016, to build 777X parts with six autoclaves for the wing and empennage parts, starting in 2017. The 787 'surge' line at the Everett factory would be converted into a 777X early production line by the end of 2015. Boeing built a 1,300,000 sq ft (120,000 m^{2}) building adjacent to the Everett factory, with a 120 ft (37 m) autoclave, and a robot to wind fiber for the wings. The first 777X was planned to be built on the ex-787 "surge" line.

The -9 firm-configuration was reached in August 2015 and assembly of the initial aircraft was to begin in 2017 for a December 2019 introduction advanced from the previously scheduled 2020. With a current 777 production rate of 100 per year, 380 on order at the end of 2013 and no orders at the February 2014 Singapore Airshow, bridging the gap to the 777X deliveries starting from 2020 is a challenge: to stimulate orders, sales of current 777s can be paired with 777Xs and used 777s can be converted to freighters to be sold and stimulate sales.

==== 2017 ====
In April 2017, the initial one-piece wing spar came onto the assembly jig and was about to enter lay-up in June; first parts assembly for the initial -9, a static test airframe, were underway in the purpose-built wing center near Everett, Washington. Four -9s, a fatigue-test airframe, and two -8s were planned for testing. Tests of avionics, power and integrated systems continue in Boeing Field laboratories and were integrated into an "Airplane Zero" in 2017 as 70% detailed design was done by June 2017.

The assembly of the first composite wing test example began in Everett in late September 2017 with its top section lowered into a jig for robotic drilling. Boeing launched the 777-9 production on October 23 with the wing spar drilling; its maiden flight was scheduled in the first quarter of 2019, one year before its introduction, perhaps with Emirates.

On November 7, 90% of the engineering drawings were released, with the airframe before the systems: 99% of the wing and 98% of the fuselage drawings were also released. The detailed design phase was expected to be completed in 2017 as avionics, power and other systems are ready for ground tests. Aircraft Numbers 1 and 6 were planned to be used for ground tests; four 777-9s (No. 2 to 5) were slated for the flight test and certification campaign, with two 777-8s to come later. Final assembly was planned to start in 2018 before roll-out the same year.

The 777X production techniques were expected to be major cost-cutters. The Fuselage Automated Upright Build (FAUB) system was developed and quietly tested in Anacortes, Washington, 40 miles north of the 777 Everett assembly plant. A major leap in automated production, it drills the tens of thousands of holes in the fuselage more quickly, accurately, and safely. The wings are the first produced by Boeing in composite and not out-sourced like for the 787, and production is largely automated as well. The specifically built billion-dollar factory has excess capacity, laying the foundation for the company's expected future programs: the New Midsize Airplane (NMA) and later the New Small Airplane to replace the 737.

==== 2018 ====
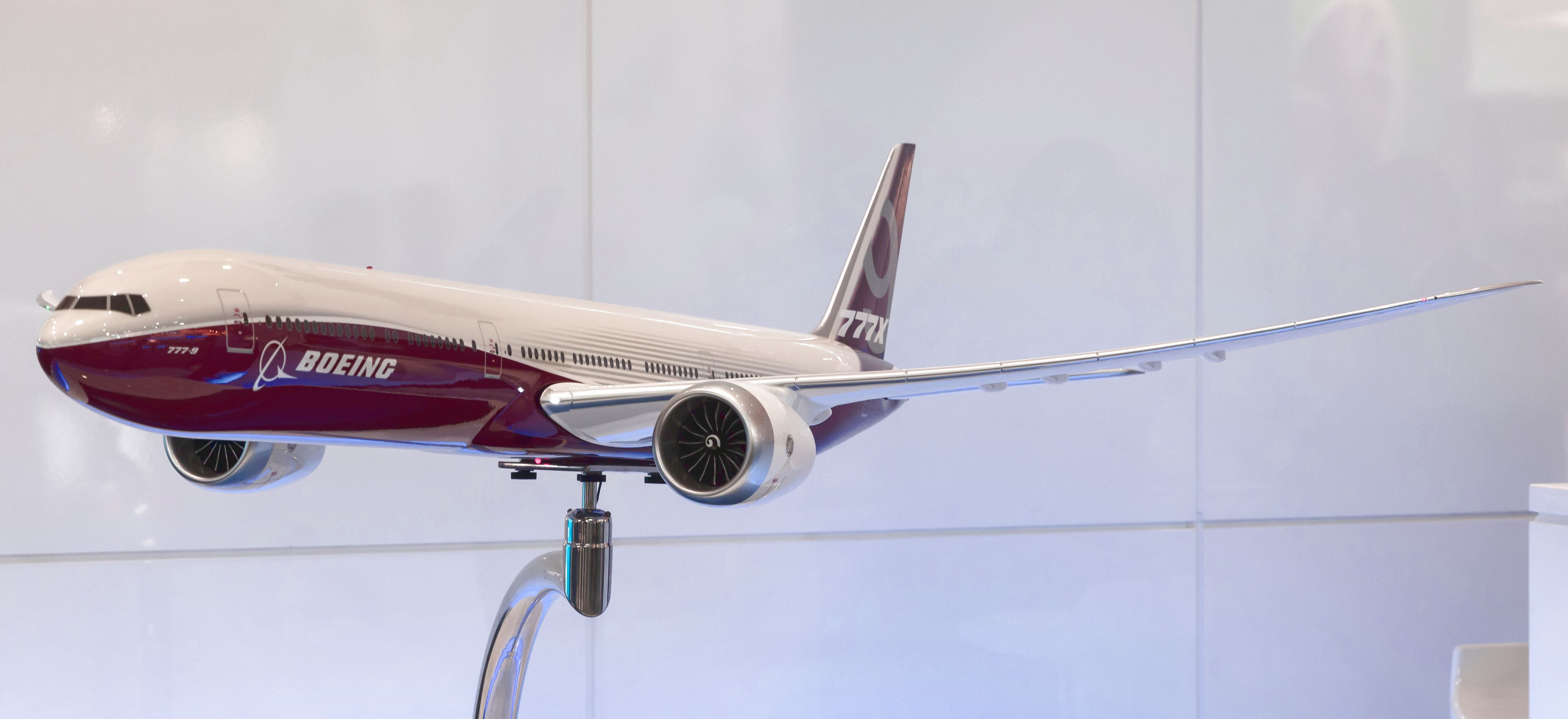
Model presented in April 2018

In February 2018, Subaru (ex–Fuji Heavy Industries) completed the first aluminum and titanium center wingbox integrated with main landing gear wheel wells at its Handa factory. The factory was completed in April 2016 and started operation in 2017. It has 125,000 square feet (11,600 m^{2}) of floor space and is equipped with automatic riveters, transfer, and painting machines.

Boeing's first composite wing spars, stringers, and skin panels are formed in the $1 billion Composite Wing Center before assembly on a new horizontal build line. In February 2018, its wing components were ready to go through assembly as Mitsubishi Heavy Industries, the 787 composite wings manufacturer, advised Boeing on the wing assembly. At this time, 93–95% of the design was released: complete for structures and in progress for systems and engine installation before interiors.

Fuselage subassemblies started shipping on February 7: aft fuselage panels from Mitsubishi Heavy Industries, center and forward fuselage panels from Kawasaki Heavy Industries and the 11/45 center wingbox from Subaru. In March, fuselage assembly was to begin in Everett at a temporary production line between the current 747-8 and 777 assembly lines to avoid disrupting the 777-300ER production. The static airframe and the first flight-test aircraft bodies were to be joined in the second quarter of 2018 and in June–July, respectively.

Scheduled for the start of 2018, the GE9X first flight has been delayed by the variable stator vane actuator arms redesign but the slip should not change the engine certification schedule or the first flight of the 777X. The flight-test engines were to be shipped later in 2018, before the year-end roll out and first flight expected in February 2019. During the component development, two temporary engines were to be placed on the first flight-test aircraft. Wing assembly is difficult, with the light but strong carbon-fiber material being less forgiving than traditional aluminum, and aircraft systems integration in a special demonstration lab is not as quick as planned.

The first 777-9 fuselage assembly started in March 2018. In May 2018, Qatar Airways head Akbar Al Baker thought development was a couple of months late but expects Boeing to catch up, provided no certification issues arise. To avoid disrupting current 777 assembly, a temporary low-rate assembly line was set up for up to 38 airframes before transitioning to the main FAL in the early 2020s. The first -9 roll-out is due in late 2018 and all four -9 prototypes are to join the flight tests by mid-2019, while the two -8 prototypes were to be assembled in 2020 before deliveries.

The first wing was completed in May for static tests before the flight test wings. By July 2018, 98% of its engineering had been released. By September, the static test 777X article was completed, lacking engines and various systems, ahead of its structural testing on ground. The first join on the static-test aircraft was done in 16 days instead of the planned 20 and lessons learned from the 787 wing-body join led to a single defect instead of the hundreds usual in new models.

The final body join of the first flight test aircraft was completed by November, before an early 2019 rollout and a second quarter first flight. By late 2019, it should be joined in the flight program by the other four 777-9 prototypes which were undergoing assembly. The first flight-test aircraft was built 20% faster than the static airframe. At the end of November, the electric systems were powered on and the rollout was expected for February 2019. First deliveries are planned for May 2020 while the first production wing spar was going to be loaded in early December. To position wings and fuselage sections, automated guided vehicles are replacing overhead cranes and "monuments" - large, permanent tooling fixtures. The primary systems were installed by December and its second GE9X engine were to be hung in early 2019.

==== 2019 ====
Engines were installed by early January 2019. The first 777-9 body join happened in February for a delivery planned in summer 2020 to Lufthansa. The roll-out of the prototype occurred on March 13, 2019, in a low-key employees-only event overshadowed by the crash of an Ethiopian Airlines 737 MAX 8 on March 10.

The GE9X engines installed on the 777X prototype were first run on May 29. However, a compressor anomaly occurred with another engine during pre-delivery tests, and the maiden flight previously planned for no earlier than June 26 was delayed while the engines are modified to a final certifiable configuration. As of 17 June 2019, GE expressed confidence that the engine would receive certification during the fall and that the first flight of the 777X would still occur in 2019. The 777X test plan was later revised as several months were required to develop and test fixes to the GE9X, and first flight slipped to October–November. By June, the first prototype began low-speed taxi tests.

On July 24, Boeing announced that the GE9X engine issue would delay the maiden flight until 2020. The company continued to predict that the first commercial deliveries would be made in 2020, intending to boost production of current-generation 777 freighters the same year. GE Aviation in Ohio would recall four GE9X turbofans from Boeing in Washington state in Antonov An-124 freighters from Volga-Dnepr Airlines, mounted in 26 x 14 x 13 ft (8 x 4 x 4 m), 36,000 lb (16.3 t) stands.

On September 5, in the presence of FAA inspectors, the rear part of the aircraft pressure vessel exploded open and a door plug blew off on the 777X static test airframe during the ultimate load test, which is conducted with the airplane stressed and pressurized beyond normal operating limits. Depending on the outcome of its root cause investigation, Boeing should have had time to modify the failed part and repeat the test during the margin from the existing engine-related delays. At 99% of ultimate load, 1.48 times the limit load, the aluminum skin ruptured under the center fuselage, aft of the wing, and the damaged structure extended up the fuselage side to a passenger plug door which blew out, akin to Alaskan Airlines 1282 − and not an outward-hinged cargo door as Boeing initially claimed. The damage was so extensive that the entire static test aircraft was scrapped shortly after.

In October 2019, the JATR board created to review the Boeing 737 MAX certification noted that the FAA would need to assess more thoroughly how modifications interact with the aircraft. The FAA did not announce how its review and certification of the 777X may be affected. The 777X was already a year behind schedule as service introduction was targeted for 2022; a further delay due to the certification as a derivative could risk key orders.

Boeing received the first flight compliant GE9X on October 18 with a second engine due by the end of the month, for a mid-November power up. On November 13, the FAUB robotic system was abandoned after six years of implementation, to use human machinists more. By mid-November, a pair of flight compliant engines were installed on the first 777-9.

==== 2020 ====
As part of an investigation by the FAA into the fatal crashes of the Boeing 737 MAX aircraft, emails were released that showed that a problematic supplier of parts for the 737 MAX flight simulators was still being used for 777X simulators, on an even more aggressive schedule. Boeing stated that the 777X does not have an equivalent of the Maneuvering Characteristics Augmentation System (MCAS) that is installed on the 737 MAX and that played a role in two crashes.

=== Testing ===
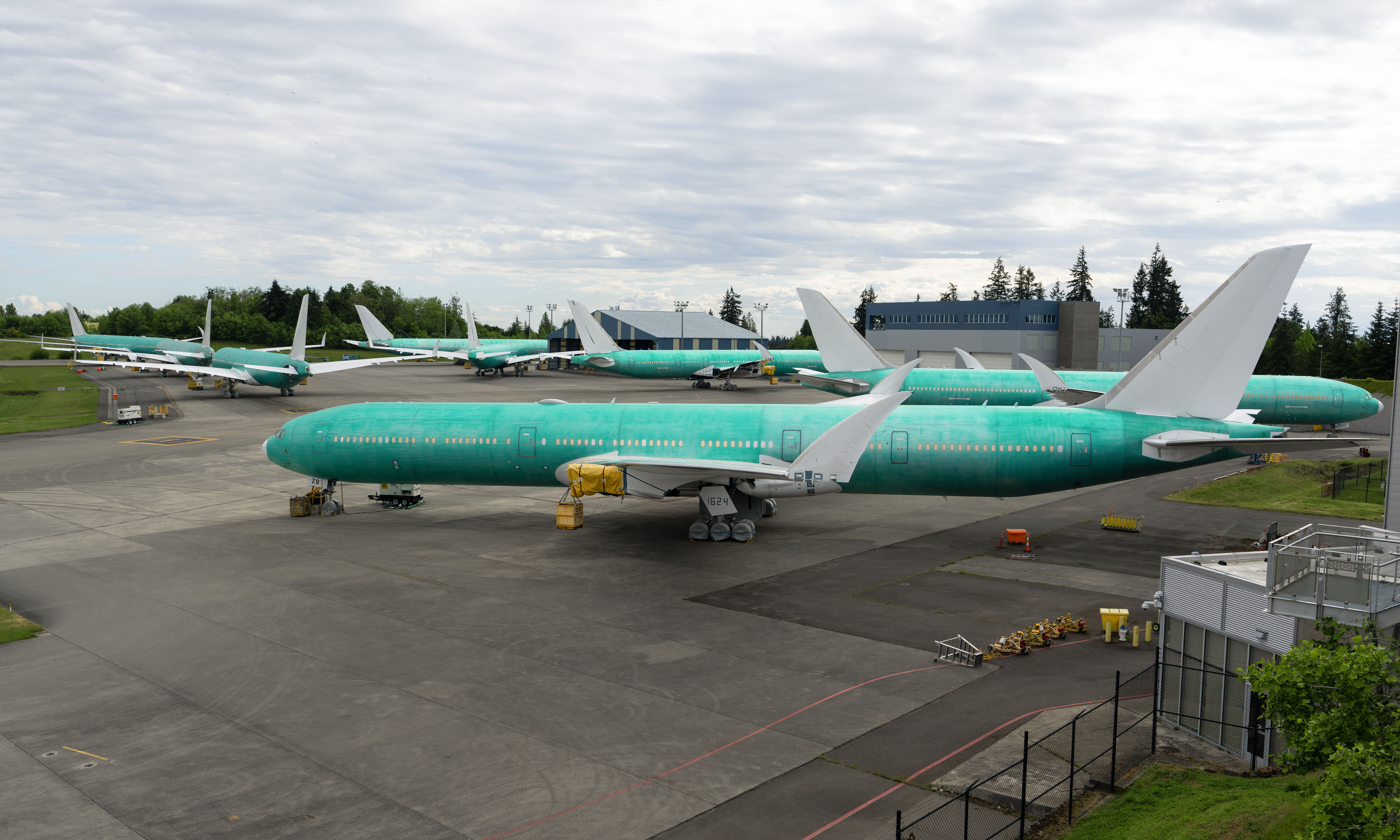
Multiple Boeing 777-9s parked at Paine Field in 2026, waiting for approval.

The first test flight took place on January 25, 2020, at 10:09 a.m. from Paine Field in Everett, and ended in Boeing Field in Seattle after 3 hours and 52 minutes. The second 777X first flew on April 30, by which point the first had explored the flight envelope for nearly 100 hours. After the first delivery was pushed back from 2021 to 2022, the third aircraft made its maiden flight on August 3; it is slated for avionics systems, APU, flight loads and propulsion performance tests.

==== 2021 ====
In January 2021, Boeing expected to add two more 777-9s to the test program, aiming for certification in 2021. In early 2021, the first delivery was pushed to late 2023. The delay was due to updated type certification requirements and the impact of the COVID-19 pandemic on aviation, and it cost Boeing $6.5 billion.

On June 27, 2021, The Seattle Times reported on an FAA letter to Boeing dated May 13 delaying type certification until mid to late 2023, pushing deliveries to 2024. The FAA cited a serious test flight incident involving an "uncommanded pitch event" and a lack of "design maturity".

==== 2022–2024 ====
In April 2022, after an "updated assessment of the time required to meet certification requirements", Boeing again delayed 777X deliveries, this time to 2025. In November 2022, it was revealed that the GE9X engine on one of the four test 777-9s had suffered a technical issue on October 6. Boeing subsequently paused the test program while GE investigated the issue.

In May 2024, launch customer Lufthansa was expecting its first deliveries in 2026. As of September 2024, its estimate has been revised to an entry into service by early 2027.

In August 2024, a routine inspection following a test flight in Hawaii led to Boeing grounding its 777X test fleet. A structural link between the engine and wing was found to be damaged, while cracks were found in the same component on other aircraft in the fleet.

On October 11, 2024, Boeing confirmed that the expected first delivery of the aircraft had slipped to 2026, following development challenges and workplace strikes at the company. Emirates cast doubt on this forecast, noting that Boeing had no clear timeline for resuming certification flights.

==== 2025 ====
Flight testing resumed on January 16, 2025, following grounding in August 2024 due to cracks discovered in engine mounting hardware. Boeing confirmed expected first delivery, to Lufthansa, had been pushed back to 2026 from the previous 2025 estimate.

On October 2, 2025, it was reported that the first delivery would slip again to 2027, resulting in additional charges estimated at between $2.5 billion and $4 billion. As a result, the initial deliveries are now expected seven years after the original date.

On November 6, 2025, the Federal Aviation Administration (FAA) gave Boeing approval to begin Phase 3 of 5 in the Type Inspection Authorization (TIA) process for the 777X. Phase 3 is widely considered the most challenging, involving rigorous inspections, extensive documentation, and real-world testing under close FAA supervision.

==== 2026 ====
On February 4, 2026, Boeing announced plans for the first flight of the production 777X in April 2026, which took place as planned with the 777X for launch customer Lufthansa. On March 6, 2026, Carsten Spohr, that airline's CEO, said that he expects the first 777X to be delivered in 2027.

In March 2026, the FAA gave Boeing approval to begin phase 4A testing of the 777X. In May 2026, Boeing flew Lufthansa's first production 777-9. Instead of a test interior, the aircraft features Lufthansa's fully outfitted passenger cabin.

In June 2026, the 777-9 entered Type Inspection Authorization (TIA) 4B, allowing FAA flight crews to pilot the aircraft. This was a major milestone towards the expected certification at the end of the year.

In July 2026, reports emerged that one 777X airframe destined for Emirates had been scrapped in 2025 as it was uneconomical to modify it to the final configuration. Emirates' CEO Tim Clark stated that the airline would refuse to take delivery of the nine other aircraft built for it in the same timeframe, noting in particular the structural issues encountered during testing and suggesting that these aircraft should also be scrapped rather than retrofitted. Lufthansa also expressed strong reservations about accepting early-build airframes.

== Design ==
=== Wing ===
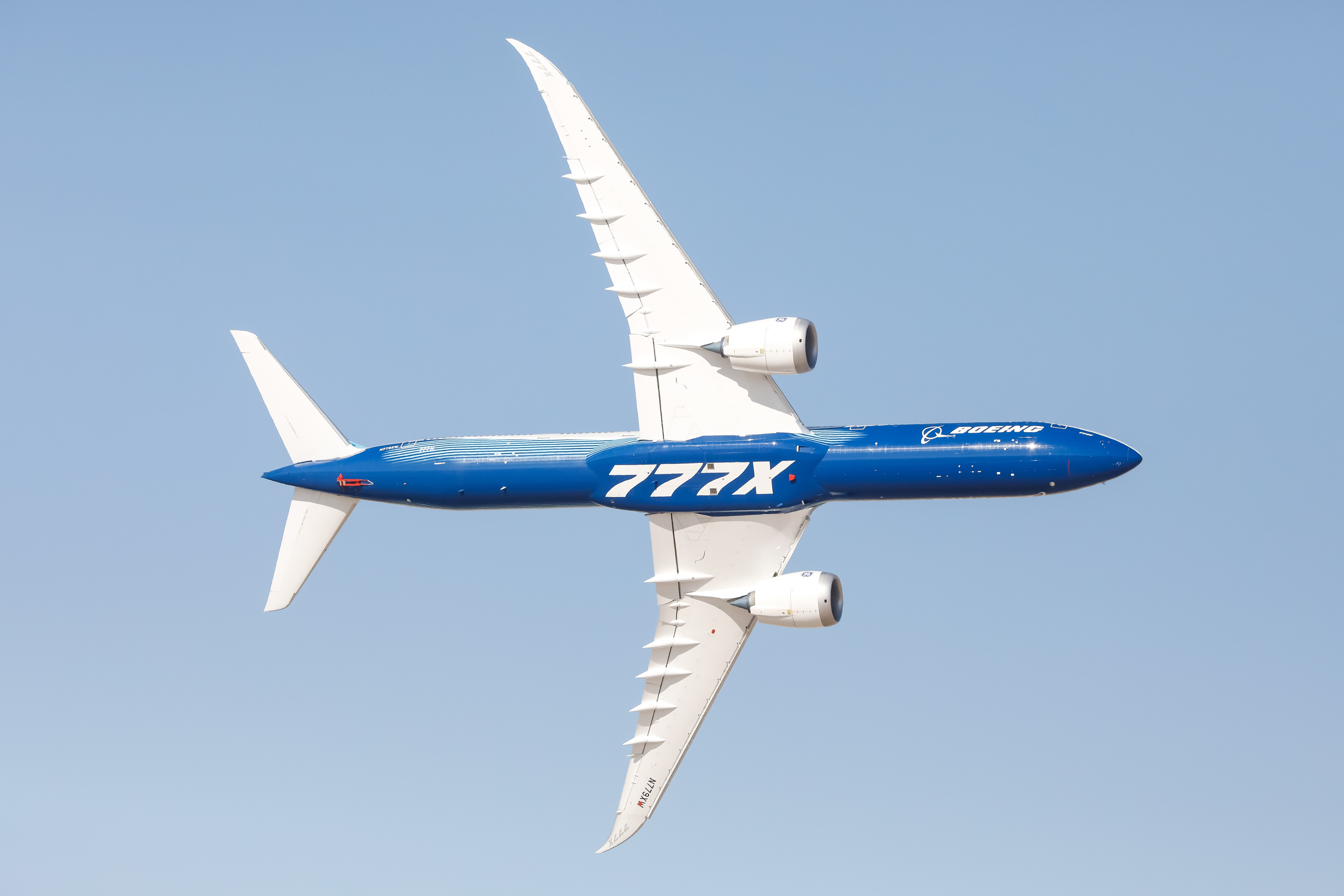
Planform of the 777-9

The 777X has a longer composite wing with folding wingtips. Due to this, the 777X is the first commercial transport aircraft to have "wingtip controls" in the cockpit. Based on the 787 wing but with less sweep, this wing has a higher lift-to-drag ratio, aspect ratio increased from 9:1 to 10:1, area increased from 4,702 to 5,562 sq ft (436.8 to 516.7 m^{2}), and usable fuel capacity increased from 320,863 to 350,410 lb (145,541 to 158,943 kg).

To stay within the size category of the current 777 with a less than 213 ft (65 m) wingspan, it features 11 feet (3.5 m) folding wingtips with the folding wingtip actuation system made by Liebherr Aerospace. The mechanism was demonstrated for Aviation Week at the Boeing Everett Factory in October 2016; the folding movement should be complete in 20 seconds and be locked in place at the end. Specific alerts and procedures are needed to handle a malfunction.

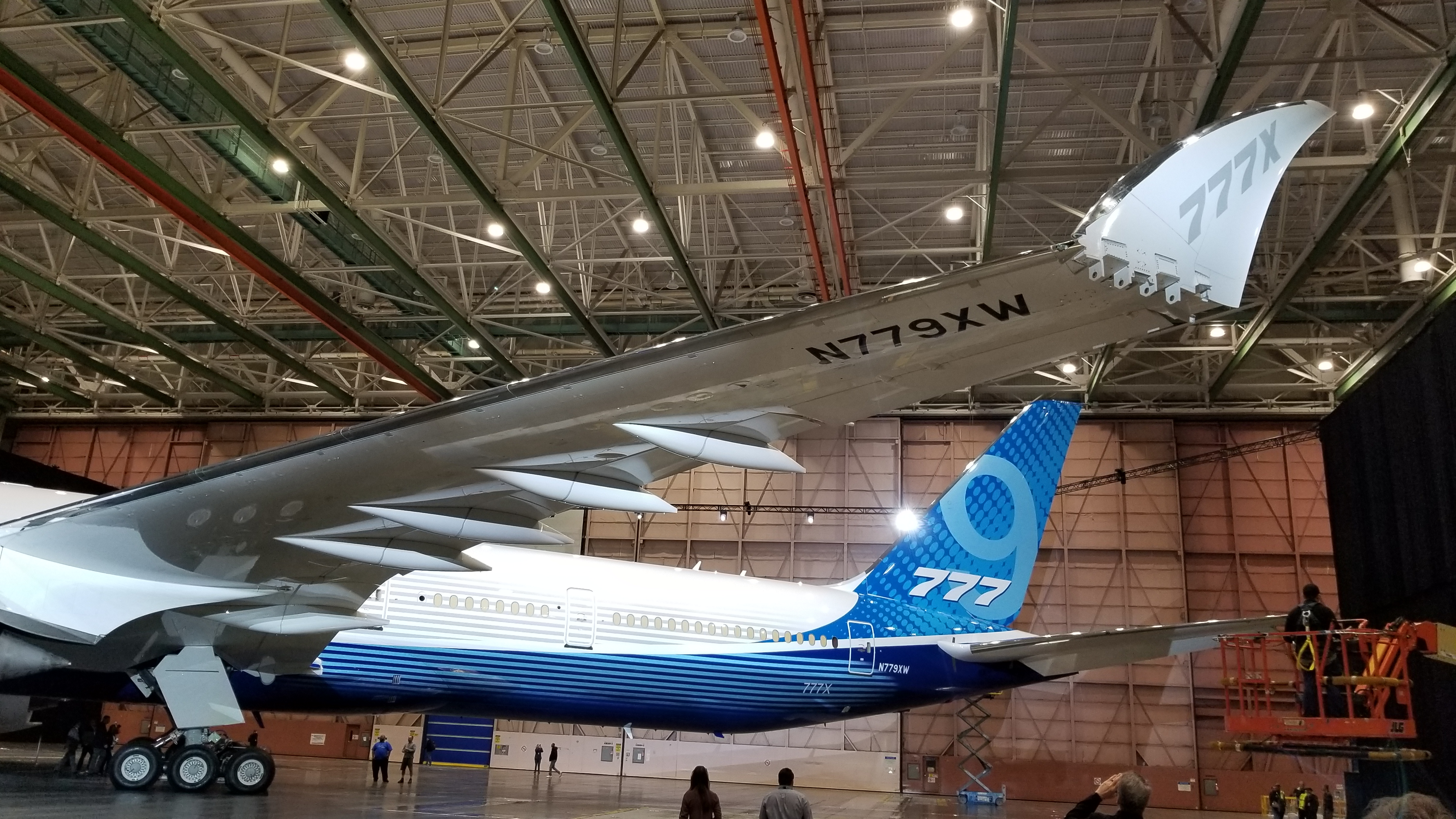
Folding wingtip at the 2019 roll-out

As existing regulations do not cover the folding wingtips, the FAA issued special conditions, including proving their load-carrying limits, demonstrating their handling qualities in a crosswind when raised, alerting the crew when they are not correctly positioned while the mechanism and controls will be further inspected. Those ten special conditions were published on May 18, 2018, covering worst-case scenarios.

Transported by sea from Subaru in Nagoya to Everett, the center wing-box is similar in size to the legacy 777 but is more reinforced and heavier, with more titanium.

=== Interior ===
The internal cabin width is increased from the previous 777 models' 231 to 235 in (587 to 597 cm) through thinner interior cabin walls and better insulation to allow 18.0 in (46 cm) wide seats in 10-abreast economy. The 777X will feature cabin design details requiring structural changes that were originally introduced on the Boeing 787 Dreamliner: larger windows, higher ceilings, more humidity and lowered cabin altitude to 6,000 ft (1,800 m). Its flight deck is similar to the 787 cockpit with large displays and head-up displays, controls for the folding wingtips, and touchscreens replacing cursor control devices. Windows are dimmable but have an available option for the standard window shades.

=== Efficiency ===
For the longer 777-9, replacing the engines should improve fuel consumption by 10%, with the longer, carbon-fiber wings adding an estimated 7% improvement. As 4 to 5% of fuel savings is lost from the 12 tons heavier basic structure of the larger airliner, the net fuel efficiency gain is projected to be 12 to 13%. Ten-abreast seating instead of nine with a longer fuselage enable a reduction in fuel burn per seat of 20% compared to the 365-seat 777-300ER. The longer-range, 355-seat 777-8 should have a 13% improvement in fuel consumption with 10 fewer seats than the -300ER. Boeing forecast a 33% better cost per seat than the 747-400 and 13% better than the 777-300ER.

Its maximum takeoff weight is targeted for 775,000 lb (351.5 t) like the 777-300ER but Boeing hopes to have at least a 10,000 lb (4.5 t) margin at introduction. Boeing predicts the -8 to be 4% more fuel efficient and cost effective than the A350-1000, while the -9 would be 12% more fuel efficient and 11% more cost effective. Lufthansa, when it ordered both, stated the Airbus A350-900 and the 777-9X will consume an average of 2.9 L/100 km per passenger.

== Variants ==
=== 777-8 ===
The 777-8 is a shortened derivative of the 777-9, initially specified as 229 ft (69.8 m) long, between the 209 ft 1 in (63.7 m) 777-200 and 242 ft 4 in (73.9 m) 777-300. It would seat typically between 350-425 passengers with a range of 9,500 nmi (17,594 km; 10,900 mi). It would succeed the ultra-long-range 777-200LR and the 777-300ER and compete with the Airbus A350-1000.

Production of the -8 was expected to follow the -9 around two years later. It was expected to be the basis of a freighter version which would be available 18 to 24 months after the introduction of the -8. The 777-8 should feature a 13,000 lb (5.9 t) higher MTOW over the 775,000 lb (352 t) of the 777-9, for an improved range from 8,690 to 9,460 nmi (10,000 to 10,890 mi; 16,090 to 17,520 km).

Due to the Boeing 737 MAX groundings and the delayed first flight of the 777-9, in 2019 Boeing pushed back design and development of the 777-8 until at least 2021, for first deliveries expected in 2023 or beyond. The delays were not expected to affect Boeing's participation in Qantas' Project Sunrise, for which it proposed a 777-8 variant. Boeing also proposed an interim solution to Qantas, assumed to comprise a 777-9 with auxiliary fuel tanks and reduced seating capacity. However, Qantas subsequently preferred the Airbus A350-1000 for this project. The -8 would also fill the niche market for an aircraft capable of flying with a full payload from hubs in the Gulf states to the West Coast of the United States. It could, however, be cancelled if customers find the -9 acceptable for these routes.

In August 2023, Boeing announced an increase in the length of the passenger -8 to 232 ft 6 in (70.87 m), the same as the freighter version.

==== 777-8F ====
In June 2019, Qatar Airways urged Boeing to develop a 777X-based freighter to replace its existing 777Fs which were first delivered in 2009. Boeing confirmed that discussions were under way to define a timeline for a freighter variant, expected to be based on the 777-8 airframe. In July 2021, Boeing CEO David Calhoun viewed a freighter version as a logical next aircraft program to comply with emerging ICAO aircraft emission standards. On January 31, 2022, Boeing officially launched the 777-8 Freighter, with an order from Qatar Airways for 34 aircraft and 16 options, with deliveries then expected to begin in 2027. Production of the first parts began in July 2025, with first deliveries now expected in 2028. It faces significant pressure and competition from the 777-300ERSF, developed by Israel Aerospace Industries and AerCap, which has a larger size than the said 777-8F and the Airbus A350F.

=== 777-9 ===
A 777-9 prototype landing at Boeing Field in 2026.

The 777-9 is stretched by three extra seat rows and flies 630 nmi (1,170 km) farther than the 777-300ER with about the same weight. It will seat between 375-450 passengers with a range of 8,000 nmi (14,816 km; 9,200 mi). Boeing froze its design in August 2015 and was to start first assembly in 2017. The first flight of the 777-9 was on January 25, 2020.

Its operating empty weight grew from the 777-300ER's 373,500 lb (169,400 kg) to 400,000 lb (181,400 kg). In 2014, Aspire Aviation had reported that according to Boeing sources, the operating empty weight of a 777-9X in a 4-class, 300-seat configuration was 415,000 lb (188,200 kg). The same sources identified the manufacturer's empty weight at 362,000 lb (164,200 kg).

Listed at $426 million in 2018, valuation specialist Avitas estimated the -9 purchase price with typical discounts would be around $200 million (in 2018 dollars). The 777-9 is to supersede the 250 ft 2 in (76.25 m) Boeing 747-8 as the longest airliner. It is 9.4 ft (2.9 m) longer than the -300ER for a 251 ft 9 in (76.7 m) length.

=== Proposed variants ===
==== 777-10 ====
Boeing has proposed stretching the -9 by four rows of seats to accommodate 450 passengers in a 777-10X variant to compete with the Airbus A380 and a potential stretch of the A350. The company has approached several airlines including Emirates, the largest operator of both the 777 and the A380. The A380 seats between 489 and 615 passengers. The potential 263 feet (80 m) long 777-10X (12 ft or 3.7 m more) could compete against a hypothetical stretch of the A350-1000. Boeing confirmed that the 777 stretch is feasible if there is interest.

In November 2025, Emirates renewed its expression of interest in a 777-10 stretch and encouraged Boeing to conduct a new feasibility study, at the same time as it placed an order for 65 additional 777-9s beyond its previous commitment to 205 777X-family aircraft. Boeing acknowledged that the GE9X engine would have sufficient margin to power a stretched variant.

==== BBJ 777X ====
On December 10, 2018, Boeing launched Boeing Business Jet variants at the Middle East Business Aviation Association Show. The BBJ 777-8 offers a range of 11,645 nautical miles (21,570 km) and a 3,256 sq ft (302.5 sq m) cabin, while the BBJ 777-9 provides a 3,689 sq ft (342.7 sq m) cabin and a range of 11,000 nautical miles (20,370 km).

=== Comparison ===
Below is a list of major differences between the three 777X variants planned to be in production.

Boeing 777-8, -9, -8F
Model	777-8	777-9	777-8F
Main deck, 2-class seats	350-425	375-450	31 pallets (96 in × 125 in)
Main deck, 3-class seats		349–357	31 pallets (96 in × 125 in)
Lower deck ULD	40 LD3	48 LD3: 26 forward + 22 aft	13 pallets (96 in × 125 in)
Cargo capacity		8,131 ft^{3} (230.2 m^{3})	27,056 ft^{3} (766.1 m^{3})
Length	232 ft 6 in (70.87 m)	251 ft 9 in (76.73 m)	232 ft 6 in (70.87 m)
MTOW	805,000 lb (365.1 t)	775,000 lb (351.5 t)	805,000 lb (365.1 t)
Max. Payload		162,000 lb (73.5 t)	118 tonnes
Operating empty weight (OEW)		400,000 lb (180 t)	
Engine (×2)		GE9X-105B1A, -105B1A1, -105B1A2, -105B1A3, and -105B1A4, as well as the -103B1A and its akin variants	
Thrust (x2)	93,000 lbf (414 kN) (per engine)	110,000 lbf (489 kN) (per engine)	
Range	9,500 nmi (17,590 km; 10,930 mi)	8,000 nmi (14,820 km; 9,206 mi)	5,000 nmi (9,260 km; 5,754 mi)
ICAO designation	B778	B779	B778

== Orders ==
=== Order history ===
==== 2013–2016 ====
On September 19, 2013, Lufthansa became the first airline to select the 777X when it placed an order for 34 777-9 airliners, but the order was later changed to 20 firm orders and 14 options. This was followed in May 2022 with an announcement for an order of seven 777-8 Freighters destined for Lufthansa Cargo operations.

In December 2013, Hong Kong-based Cathay Pacific ordered 21 777-9 airliners with deliveries expected from 2021, but they will now not join Cathay's fleet before 2027.

In July 2014, Emirates finalized its order for 150 777X aircraft, consisting of 115 777-9s and 35 777-8s. On July 16, Qatar Airways finalized its order for 50 777-9 aircraft, with purchase rights for 50 more 777-9s. On July 31, Japan's All Nippon Airways finalized an order for 20 Boeing 777-9s.

In December 2016, Iran Air signed an agreement with Boeing that included 15 777-9 aircraft, but this agreement was effectively cancelled when the United States withdrew from the Iran Nuclear Deal in May 2018.

==== 2017–2019 ====
In February 2017, Singapore Airlines signed a letter of intent with Boeing for 20 777-9 and 19 787-10 airliners; this was firmed in June 2017. In June 2017, the three Persian Gulf carriers (Emirates, Etihad Airways and Qatar Airways) held 235 orders, 69% of the 340 commitments, which were less financially secure than previously. Etihad's widespread investing strategy had backfired as it reduced feed sources, making it harder to fill the orders for the 777X. Emirates' demand had been slowing and it was considering deferral of deliveries, having the smallest sovereign wealth fund backing of the Gulf carriers. Qatar Airways was facing economic concerns and was suffering from a diplomatic crisis with its neighbors.

After a nearly $2 billion loss in 2016, Etihad had to cut routes and shrink its fleet and thus is considering canceling or deferring its orders, preferring to incur cancellations penalties rather than recurring losses from overcapacity. On February 14, 2019, it was reported that Etihad would take only 6 of the 25 777X airliners it had originally ordered.

On February 28, 2019, British Airways parent International Airlines Group ordered up to 42 777-9, 18 firm and 24 options, valued at up to $18.6 billion (~$23.1 billion in 2025), to replace its 747-400s.

On November 7, 2019, Lufthansa stated it had converted 14 orders into options, leaving 6 firm commitments, after having negotiated a change as part of its order for 20 787s.

On November 20, 2019, Emirates reduced its order total to 115 in exchange for ordering 30 Boeing 787-9s, while remaining the largest 777X customer.

==== 2021–2022 ====
In January 2021, Boeing reduced its sales expectation for the program from 400 to 350 aircraft. Boeing reclassified 118 orders from firm to uncertain under the ASC 606 accounting rule, for 191 orders down from 309 previously. On February 9, Singapore Airlines announced that they had converted an order for 14 Boeing 787-10 Dreamliners into 11 Boeing 777-9s; bringing its order for the 777-9 to 31.

On January 31, 2022, Qatar Airways became the launch customer for the 777X Freighter program, with an order of up to 50 Boeing 777-8 Freighters, expanding its commitment to the Boeing 777X family. In March 2022, Ethiopian Airlines signed a memorandum of understanding for five 777-8Fs.

==== 2023–2025 ====
On February 11, 2023, Air India signed a letter of intent (LOI) to buy 10 Boeing 777-9s as part of a combined 470 aircraft order from both Airbus and Boeing. The airline confirmed the order at the Paris Air Show on June 20, 2023, which included 10 777Xs, 20 787 Dreamliners and 190 737 MAX jets with options for further 50 737 MAXs and 20 787 Dreamliners. It was Boeing's largest single order in South Asia and highlighted its 90-year partnership with Air India. On November 13, 2023, at the 2023 Dubai Airshow Emirates ordered an additional 90 777Xs, including 55 of the 777-9 and 35 of the 777-8, bringing the airline's total order to 205 777Xs.

On March 5, 2024, Ethiopian Airlines announced an agreement with Boeing for eight 777-9s with options for 12 more. On December 19, 2024, China Airlines announced plans to order ten 777-9s to replace their existing 777-300ERs along with four 777-8F to supplement their freighter fleet.

In March 2025, shortly after the major rebrand of the Korean Air, it is reported that the airline has finalized an order of 20 777-9 aircraft as part of an 40-aircraft deal with Boeing and GE Aerospace, it is the result of the memorandum of understanding (MoU) which was signed during 2024 Farnborough International Airshow. The deal also includes 8 spare engines plus two options and a maintenance service contract for the GE9X engines.

On August 6, 2025, Cathay Pacific ordered an additional 14 aircraft, which brings the airline's total commitment to 35 airframes. However, estimated delivery of the first airframe has been pushed back to 2027. On November 17, 2025, Emirates boosted their 777-9 order by 65 jets, increasing the total order to 270 777-9s. On December 10, Boeing reported that Etihad Airways had cancelled some orders for the 777X, instead shifting to order A330neos and A350s from Airbus.

==== 2026 ====
On April 24, 2026, an undisclosed customer ordered 28 aircraft, bringing the grand total from 621 to 649.

On September 16, 2026, Korean Air ordered 20 777-9 aircraft, and 8 777-8F freighters, bringing the total up to 677, part of a finalization of a procurement originally initiated as an MoU in August 2025. This also included 25 787-10s and 50 737 MAX 10s.

On October 1, 2026, Ethiopian Airlines bought a total of 8 777-8Fs, bringing the total count up to 685. This was part of a broader 10-freighter deal that includes 2 current generation 777Fs. This agreement also included purchase rights for an additional 8 777-8Fs.

== Specifications (Boeing 777-9) ==
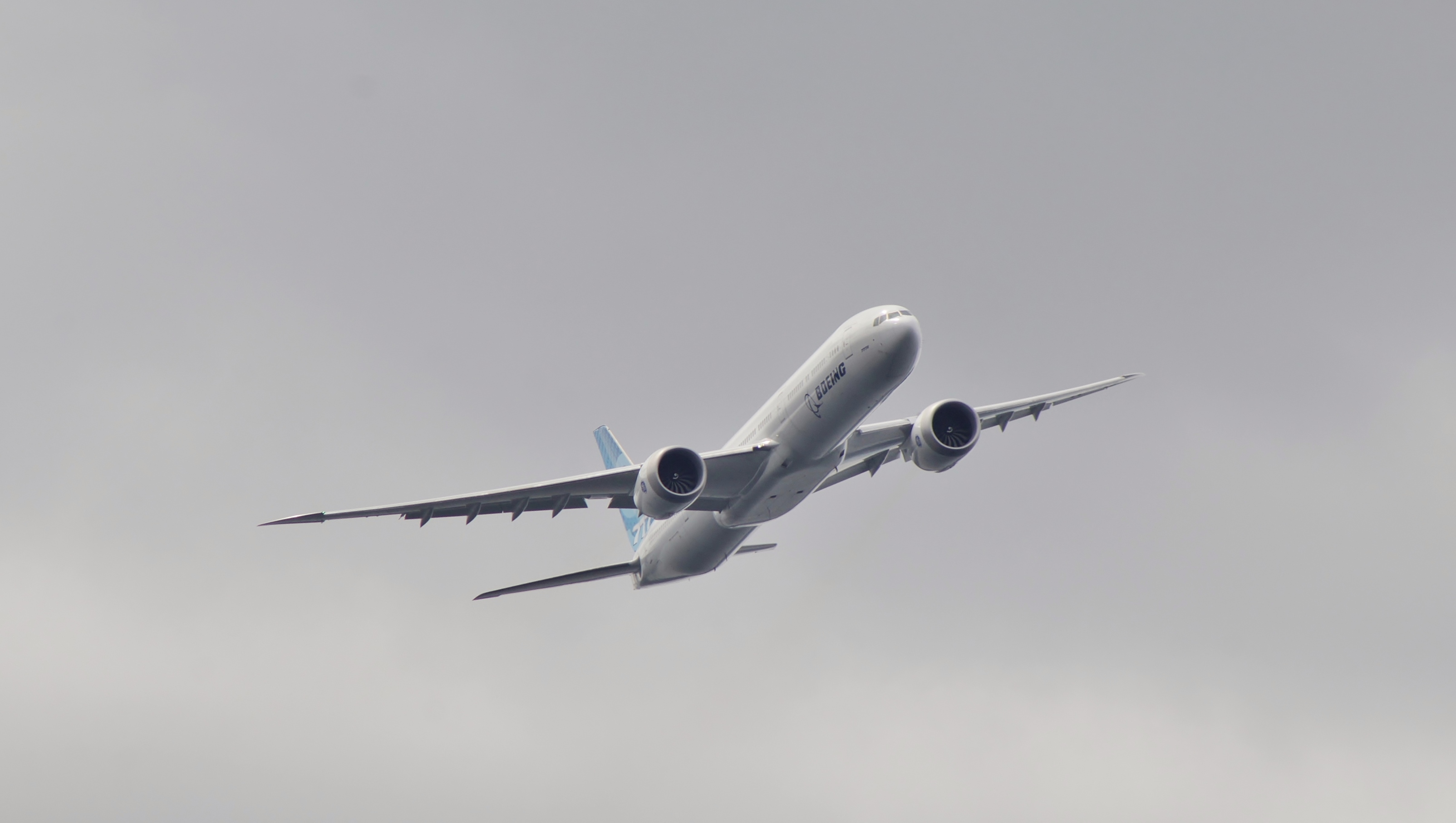
An 777-9 demonstrating a flyover at the 2025 Seafair.

Data from

General characteristics

- Crew: 2
- Capacity: 414 (two classes) or 349 (three classes) passengers, 7,815 cu ft (221.3 m^{3}) of cargo (8,131 ct ft (230.2 m^{3}) if fitted with large aft cargo door)
- Length: 251 ft 9 in (76.73 m)
- Wingspan: 235 ft 5 in (71.76 m) (212 ft 9 in (64.84 m) with wingtips folded)
- Width: 20 ft 4 in (6.20 m) (fuselage)
- Height: 64 ft 1 in (19.53 m)
- Wing area: 5,562 sq ft (516.7 m^{2})
- Empty weight: 400,000 lb (181,437 kg)
- Max takeoff weight: 775,000 lb (351,534 kg)
- Fuel capacity: 52,136 US gal (197,356 L) or 349,311 lb (158,477 kg) usable fuel
- Powerplant: 2 × General Electric GE9X-105B1A and subvariants, or -102B1A and akin subvariants high-bypass turbofan, 110,000 lbf (490 kN) thrust each

Performance

- Range: 9,210 mi (14,820 km, 8,000 nmi)

== See also ==
- Boeing 747-8
- Boeing 787 Dreamliner

Related development

- Boeing 777

Aircraft of comparable role, configuration, and era

- Airbus A380
- Airbus A350
- Comac C939
- Ilyushin Il-96-400M

Related lists

- List of civil aircraft
