= BOC Aviation =

Bank of China Aircraft leasing company

BOC Aviation Limited
- Formerly: Singapore Aircraft Leasing Enterprise Pte. Ltd.
- Type: Public (subsidiary)
- Traded as: SEHK: 2588
- Industry: Aircraft leasing
- Founded: 1996 (30 years ago) in Singapore
- Headquarters: 79 Robinson Road, #15-01, Downtown Core, Singapore
- Revenue: ▲US$2.619 billion (2025)
- Operating income: ▼US$936 million (2025)
- Net income: ▼US$787 million (2025)
- Total assets: ▲US$26.338 billion (2025)
- Total equity: ▲US$6.841 billion (2025)
- Number of employees: 211 (2025)
- Parent: Bank of China (70%)
- Website: www.bocaviation.com

BOC Aviation is a global aircraft operating leasing company based in Singapore. It is the largest aircraft operating leasing company headquartered in Asia, as measured by the value of owned aircraft, and is listed on the Hong Kong Stock Exchange (SEHK: 2588) with its headquarters in Singapore and offices in Dublin, London, New York and Tianjin.

== History ==
The company was founded in 1993 as Singapore Aircraft Leasing Enterprise Pte. Ltd. (SALE), a joint venture between Singapore Airlines and Boullioun Aviation Services, Inc., a U.S.-based aircraft operating leasing company. In 1995, SALE acquired its first aircraft and in 1996 placed the first order with Airbus. In 1997, Temasek Holdings and Government of Singapore Investment Corporation (GIC) invested into the company.

In 2000, the company was reported to be the largest customer of the Airbus' single-aisle aircraft in Asia.

In July 2004, SALE underwent a change in its shareholder structure, following the transfer of the 35.5% stake held by Seattle-based Boullioun Aviation Services to the US lessor's parent company WestLB AG of Germany. The remaining ownership then of SALE was unchanged, with Singapore Airlines holding 35.5%, while GIC and Temasek Holdings each retaining 14.5%.

In 2006, SALE was the largest aircraft leasing company in Asia. In December, the company was acquired by Bank of China for US$965 million and was named BOC Aviation on 2 July 2007.

On 12 May 2016, the company was converted to a public company limited by shares and the company's name was changed to BOC Aviation Limited.

On 1 June 2016, the company was listed on the Main Board of the Stock Exchange of Hong Kong.

In August 2019, BOC Aviation signed a purchase-and-leaseback agreement with Qatar Airways, the state-owned flag carrier of Qatar, for three new Airbus A350 twin-aisle aircraft to be delivered by the end of the third quarter.
