= Xinwu, Wuxi =

Xinwu 新吴区
- District
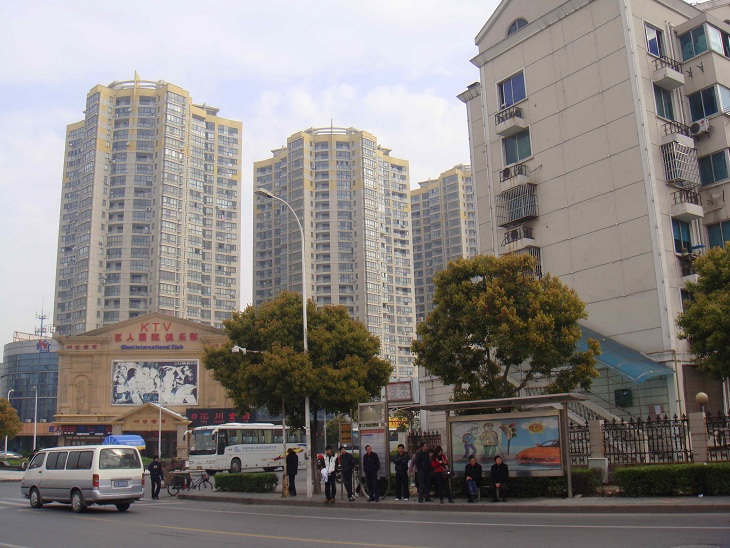
- Xinwu District in April 2010

- Location in Jiangsu
- Coordinates: 31°31′03″N 120°23′13″E
- Country: People's Republic of China
- Province: Jiangsu
- Prefecture-level city: Wuxi

Area
  - Total: 220 km^{2} (85 sq mi)

Population (2020 census)
  - Total: 720,215
  - Density: 3,300/km^{2} (8,500/sq mi)
- Time zone: UTC+8 (China Standard)
- Postal Code: 214028

Xinwu District (simplified Chinese: 新吴区; traditional Chinese: 新吳區; pinyin: Xīnwú Qū) is one of five urban districts of Wuxi, Jiangsu Province, People's Republic of China.

Located in the delta hinterland of the Yangtze River to the southeast of center Wuxi, the district has an area of 219 square kilometres (85 sq mi) and a total population of 536,807. Before 2015, Xinwu was officially known as the Wuxi New District, a national-level development area. It has been viewed as the economic engine behind the opening-up of Wuxi and a center of scientific innovation and industrial transformation.

== Background ==
Formerly known as Wuxi National Hi-Tech Industry Development Zone, Wuxi New District (WND) was founded in 1992 as an industrial zone to attract large foreign companies. After undergoing some administrative changes in 1995, 2002 and 2005, it has now six sub-districts---Wangzhuang, Shuofang, Jiangxi, Meicun, Hongshan and Xin'an, and is currently administrating the Wuxi Hi-tech Industrial Development Zone, Wuxi (Taihu) International Technology Park, Wuxi Airport Industrial Park, China (Wuxi) Industrial Expo Park, China Wu Culture Expo Park, and International Education and Living Community. In 2015, the district was renamed to Xinwu ("New Wu"). The district covers a total area of 220 square kilometers and a population of 600,000 (based on 2014 census).

== Geography ==
Xinwu is located in the suburb of Wuxi city in southeastern part of East China's Jiangsu province, between Shanghai and Nanjing. It lies within the Yangtze River Delta, China's most industrialized area. The district enjoys convenient transportation with a high-speed rail station and an airport. It also borders a great highway network and top international ports.

== Demographics ==
Xinwu has an area of 218.72 square kilometres and according to the 2010 Census, a population of 550,000 inhabitants. Among them 319,000 are registered population. The 2010 Census shows that the area has a migrant population of 345,000, including 2,857 foreign nationals.

According to Wuxi Almanac 2014, by the end of 2013, Wuxi New District has 112,651 households and a permanent population of 332,239, while the migrant population have reached 362,434, including 5,849 foreign nationals.

== Economy ==
The district has built up a pillar industry in equipment manufacturing, cultivated emerging industries in micro-electronics, Internet of things, new materials and bio-pharmaceuticals, and three characteristic industries namely airport logistics, software & service outsourcing and cultural industry.

=== Achievements ===
WND has taken the second place in comprehensive evaluation among national development parks in Jiangsu for nine consecutive years. In 2014, its GDP reached 126.1 billion yuan. The industrial output value above designated size totaled at 287.4 billion yuan. The Wuxi New District generates 15 percent of Wuxi's GDP with 4.6 percent land of the city and 6.8 percent of its population.

As of 2012, the 20th anniversary of its establishment, WND has won 28 national-level titles for its brands and bases, including recognition as a national innovation park, national ecological industry demonstration zone and national pilot zone for intellectual property.

=== Equipment Manufacturing Industry ===
According to the latest updates on the official website of Wuxi New District (bizwnd.gov.cn), high-end equipment manufacturing industry is the economic engine of WND. The district has more than 400 equipment manufacturing enterprises operating in fields including the whole machine equipment, auto parts, energy saving and environmental protection equipment, engineering machinery, and mechanical and electrical equipment. It is the first industrial cluster in WND with the total output value exceeding 100 billion yuan.

=== Internet of Things and Cloud Computing ===
In November 2009, the State Council approved Wuxi as a national innovation and demonstration area for wireless sensor network. In 2013, the output value of Internet of Things (IoT) core industry in Wuxi New District exceeded 70 billion yuan, accounting for 38.4 percent of the output value of the whole high-tech industry in the district. Wuxi New District has formed a cloud computing industrial distribution, featuring hardware, platform and application.

=== New Material ===
The new material industry in Wuxi New District takes metal material, optoelectronic material and nonmetallic composite as its development priorities. Leading enterprises in the field such as Osram and Sharp are settled in the district.

=== Biological medicine industry ===
Wuxi New District is growing up to be a biological medicine industry cluster involving life sensor, biological pharmacy, medical instruments (including diagnostic reagent) and health services. More than 200 biological medicine companies, some of which are leading giants in their respective fields worldwide, have got their branches in the district. WND's annual industrial output from the biological medicine industry was 14.3 billion yuan in 2013.

=== Microelectronics industry ===
Wuxi was made the southern base of China's microelectronics industry during the 1980s. The overall size of its integrated circuit industry now takes up 25 percent of the country's total microelectronics industry. WND is the most conducive area in Wuxi for the development of integrated circuit industry with an industrial scale accounting for more than 70 percent of the city's total in the sector. The district ranks first in the development pace of the microelectronics industry in China as far as total industrial output, design and processing technology level and attracting professional talent are concerned.

WND is also one of the eight major integrated circuit design industrialization bases approved by the State Ministry of Science and Technology. The microelectronics industry operating carrier in the district includes three professional parks---the National Integrated Circuit Design Park, the Information Industry Science and Technology Park and Integrated Circuit Industry Park.

=== Software and service outsourcing industry ===
WND is home to around 1,000 software and service outsourcing enterprises, including 25 world's top 500 enterprises, and 26 global service outsourcing top 100 companies, such as Microsoft, Intel, Oracle, IBM, NTT data, Fujitsu, Pactera, ChinaSoft International and Unissoft. In 2013, WND's output value of software and service outsourcing industry was 61 billion yuan.

=== Airport Logistics ===
Wuxi New District, with Shuofang International Airport located in the area, houses an industrial logistics cluster involving airport logistics, newport logistics and high-tech logistics. A number of logistics companies such as Mapletree, ProLogis, Kerry, SF, Deppon and Kintetsu have their offices in the district. Its future development focuses on local logistics economy include port, bonded and e-business distribution logistics.

=== Cultural Industry ===
Wuxi New District, the birthplace of the Wu Culture, has a history of 3,000 years. It boasts several cultural resources and famous attractions such as the Bodu River and Taibo Temple. According to the official update, the district now has 310 cultural enterprises and provides job posts to 13,000 people. The emerging cultural industry covers fields such as Internet advertising, e-commerce, Internet information services, video, animation and games.

== Culture ==
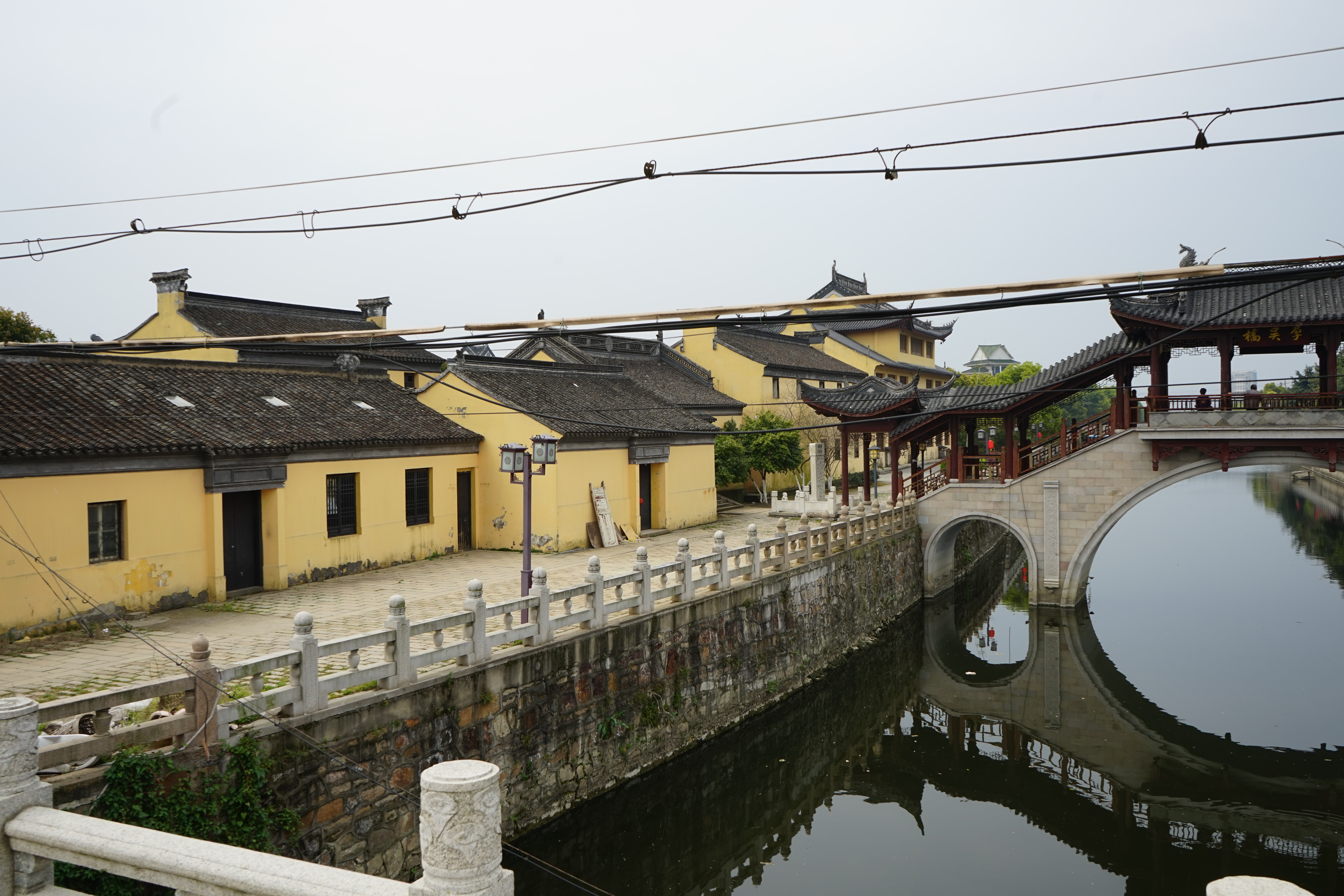
Bodu River and the back of Taibo Temple

Meicun in Xinwu is believed to be the birthplace of the Wu culture in 1100 BC, a Chinese subculture named after the Wu Kingdom of the Spring and Autumn period (770–476BC). Bodu River and Taibo Temple, two cultural relics from the state of Wu, are located in the WND.

The ninth day of the first month in the Chinese lunar calendar marks the traditional festival for Meicun people to pay tribute to Taibo, son of King Tai of the Zhou Dynasty (c. 11th century to 256 BC). Taibo brought the culture of the central plains along with its etiquette and agriculture to the region, which is viewed as the origin of Wu culture. The Taibo Temple Fair was listed as a national intangible cultural heritage in 2014. Meicun hosts the Taibo Temple Fair from February 26 to March 5 every year to carry forward traditional culture.

== Education ==
=== Wuxi International School ===
Wuxi International School, WIS for short, was established in 2003. It is the only government-owned international school in Wuxi. It aims to provide an international education environment for children of foreign people living and working in China, as well as those from Hong Kong, Macao and Taiwan. The school features an integration of Asian and Western educational systems. It takes English as the primary teaching language supplemented with Mandarin Chinese. Curriculums are based on the textbooks of Singapore, drawing on the advantages of British and American educational programs with enhanced Chinese courses. It stresses science courses with special focus on math training. Wuxi International School is located in 300 Xing Chuang Si Road in Wuxi New District. It once had a campus in another part of the Wuxi New Area. The Wuxi Japanese Saturday School (Japanese: 無錫(ﾑｼｬｸ)補習授業校 Mujaku Hoshū Jugyō Kō), a Japanese international school, as of 2008 was held at the Wuxi International School.

=== EtonHouse International School ===
EtonHouse is a Singapore-based educational group that provides educational services through international schools and pre-schools in 11 countries across Asia. EtonHouse International School in Wuxi started operations in 2008. It is located in Regent International Garden at the junction of Taishan Road and Xixing Road in Wuxi New District.

=== International Kindergartens in WND ===
There are a number of international kindergartens located in Wuxi's New District, including the Victoria Bilingual Kindergarten on Changjiang North Road, Wuxi International Child Care on Xishi Road, and Kinderworld on Changjiang North Road.

== Administrative divisions ==
At present, Xinwu District has 7 subdistricts.

7 subdistricts

- Wangzhuang (旺庄街道)
- Nanzhan (南站街道)
- Shuofang (硕放街道)
- Fangqian (坊前街道)
- Xin'an (新安街道)
- Meicun (梅村街道)
- Hongshan (鸿山街道)

== Sister City ==
- Oshawa, Ontario, Canada
- Toyokawa, Aichi, Japan

== See also ==
- China (Wuxi) University Tech Park of Sensing Network
