= SF Intra-city =

Chinese on-demand delivery services company

Hangzhou SF Intra-city Industrial Co., Ltd.
- Company type: Public
- Traded as: SEHK: 9699.HK
- Industry: On-demand delivery services
- Founded: March 2019
- Founder: SF Express
- Headquarters: Shenzhen, Guangdong, China
- Area served: China, Hong Kong
- Products: Third-party on-demand delivery services
- Revenue: RMB 10 billion (2022)
- Net income: Turned profitable in 2023
- Number of employees: 550,000 active merchants (2024)
- Website: www.sfcityrush.com

Hangzhou SF Intra-city Industrial Co., Ltd. (杭州顺丰同城实业股份有限公司), also known as SF Intra-city, is the largest independent third-party on-demand delivery platform in China. The company provides delivery services across various scenarios such as food, local retail, e-commerce, and local services, SF Intra-city is headquartered in Shenzhen, Guangdong, and is a subsidiary of SF Express.

SF Intra-city operates as a separate entity from SF Holding since 2019 and was listed on the Hong Kong Stock Exchange in December 2021. As of 2024, the platform covers more than 2,000 cities and counties across China and started offering services in Hong Kong under the brand name "SoFast."

== History ==
SF Intra-city began as an internal division of SF Express in 2015, targeting the growing market for intra-city, on-demand delivery services. In 2019, it became an independent legal entity, officially operating as Hangzhou SF Intra-city Industrial Co., Ltd.

In December 2021, the company was successfully listed on the Main Board of the Hong Kong Stock Exchange. By 2023, it became the first third-party on-demand delivery service provider in China to turn profitable. In 2024, SF Intra-city expanded its services to Hong Kong under the brand "SoFast" and was included in the Hang Seng Composite Index.

== Strategic partnerships ==
SF Intra-city has established strategic partnerships with leading platforms like Douyin (TikTok in mainland China), Alibaba Group, WeChat, and DiDi. These collaborations help SF Intra-city expand its service offerings and enhance customer experiences.

== History ==
- 2015: SF Intra-city was established as a business unit of SF Express.
- 2019: SF Intra-city became an independent legal entity.
- 2021: Listed on the Main Board of the Hong Kong Stock Exchange.
- 2023: Achieved profitability, becoming the first company in the on-demand delivery industry to do so.
- 2024: Expanded services to Hong Kong under the brand "SoFast." and soon be included in the Hang Seng Composite Index.

== See also ==
- SF Express
- SF Airlines
