= SF Holding =

Chinese multinational logistics holding company

- Type: Public
- Traded as: SZSE: 002352; SZSE 100 Component; SEHK: 6936; CSI A100
- Industry: Cargo airline and logistics
- Founded: March 26, 1993; 33 years ago in Shunde, Guangdong
- Founder: Wang Wei
- Headquarters: Shenzhen, Guangdong, China
- Area served: Worldwide
- Services: International express delivery and logistics services
- Revenue: RMB 308.2 billion (2025)
- Net income: RMB 11.117 billion (2025)
- Total assets: RMB 216.4 billion (2025)
- Number of employees: 158,761 (2025)
- Subsidiaries: SF Airlines; SF Intra-city; Kerry Logistics; SF Technology; SF Supply Chain
- Website: sf.com

SF Holding Co., Limited is a Chinese multinational integrated logistics service provider headquartered in Shenzhen, Guangdong offering a wide range of services, including express, freight, cold chain logistics, Intra-city on-demand delivery, supply chains, and international logistics. Its business covers 339 prefecture-level cities across China and operates in over 200 countries. It operates 99 cargo aircraft and over 200,000 vehicles, making it the largest air and land transport fleet in Asia. It owns SF Airlines the largest cargo airline in China.

SF Holding's business model includes direct operations, integrated capabilities, and third-party independence. It is listed on Shenzhen Stock Exchange and is included in the CSI 300 and MSCI Emerging Markets Index constituents. It has four listed companies: KLN, SF Intra-city, SF REIT and KEX Express (Thailand). In 2023, it recorded a net profit of RMB 8.2 billion.

== History ==
On March 26, 1993, Wang Wei registered SF Express in Shunde, Guangdong. It began operation with six employees with focus on express delivery business between Shunde, Lufeng and Hong Kong. In the late 1990s, SF Holding introduced a performance-based salary system that linked couriers' earnings to the number of parcels delivered and freight costs. In 2002, SF Holding cancelled the franchise system and changed to direct operations. In the same year, it established its headquarters in Futian, Shenzhen. In 2003, the outbreak of SARS led people to avoid shopping in person, accelerating the growth of online shopping and creating a new development opportunity for SF Holding. In the economic depression of that year, SF Holding signed an agreement with Yangtze River Express to charter 5 aircraft.

In 2009, SF Holding founded SF Airlines and purchased two cargo planes becoming the only private express delivery company in China that owned its own aircraft. In 2010, SF Holding expanded its business into Singapore, marking its entry into the international market. By 2012, SF Holding air fleet increased to 30 all-cargo charter flights with over 5000 business locations, more than 150 hubs and over 10,000 operating vehicles and reached a turnover of over RMB 20 billion.

In 2013, SF Holding expanded its business into new divisions such as cold chain and pharmaceutical logistics, and LTL freight, becoming an integrated logistics service provider. By 2015, SF Holding's revenue reached RMB 47.3 billion, up 23.6% year-on-year, and its profit was RMB 1.967 billion, up 80% year-on-year. Its core profit after deducting non-recurring business was RMB 1.623 billion, up 76% year-on-year. Its gross profit margin increased from 17.55% to 20.42%. Its air fleet increased to over 30 all-cargo charter flights, with over 30,000 business locations, over 200 hubs, and more than 15,000 operating vehicles. On May 23, 2016, SF Express applied for a backdoor listing on the Shenzhen A-share market. Maanshan Dingtai Rare Earth & New Material Co., Ltd. announced that it would acquire 100% of SF Holding for RMB 44.3 billion, of which Maanshan Dingtai Rare Earth & New Material Co., Ltd. would pay SF Holding shareholders by issuing 3.95 billion new shares at RMB 10.76 per share. After the transaction is completed, Mingde Holding, controlled by Wang Wei, the founder and CEO of SF Express, would hold 64.58% of the shares of the new company.

The company was listed on the Shenzhen Stock Exchange in January 2017. In February of the same year, Maanshan Dingtai Rare Earth & New Material Co., Ltd. was officially renamed SF Holding Co., Limited. On February 9, 2018, SF Holding invested RMB 45.9 billion to participate in the investment and construction of Ezhou Airport. In July 2018, SF Holding completed the acquisition of a 75% stake in HAVI China Holding LLC, planning to expand its cold chain logistics business in Mainland China, Hong Kong and Macau. In the same year, it completed the acquisition of Guangdong Xinbang Logistics Co., Ltd. and related express business assets, and established SX Freight, an independent franchise model LTL freight company. In the same year, the company acquired Deutsche Post DHL Group and its supply chain business in mainland China, Hong Kong and Macau for RMB 5.5 billion. This includes DHL Global Forwarding (Hong Kong) LTD., Ocean Overseas Holdings Limited, and Deutsche Post Beteiligungen Holding GmbH. On February 18, 2019, it was officially renamed SF DHL Supply Chain China.

In 2021, SF REIT was listed on the Main Board of the Hong Kong Stock Exchange. In the same year, SF Holding announced that it would spend RMB 17.56 billion to acquire a 51.8% stake in Kerry Logistics. After the completion of the process, SF Chairman Wang Wei was appointed as chairman of the board and Non-Executive Director of Kerry Logistics Network Limited. SF Holding also completed a private placement of A shares, raising a total of RMB 20 billion. In December 2021, SF Intra-city completed its listing on the Main Board of the Hong Kong Stock Exchange. In 2023, SF Holding was shortlisted for the Fortune Global 500. In the same year, it was shortlisted for the top 50 private logistics companies in China as evaluated by the China Federation of Logistics & Purchasing. The Ezhou cargo hub became China's first dedicated air cargo hub. The airport launched 48 domestic cargo routes and 17 international cargo routes, covering Asia and extending to Europe and America, forming an extensive air cargo network. In September 2023, SF Holding's sorting and transshipment center located in the Ezhou cargo hub officially began operations.

In May 2024, SF Holding submitted a prospectus for a secondary listing in Hong Kong. In the same year, it passed the hearing of the Hong Kong Stock Exchange on November 10 and planned to be listed on the main board of Hong Kong on November 27. The joint sponsors were Goldman Sachs, Huatai International and JPMorgan Chase, making it the first "A+H" listed company in China's logistics industry. In December 2024, SF Holding's H shares were included in the Hong Kong Stock Connect. On March 3, 2025, Kerry Logistics, a subsidiary of SF Holding, announced rebranding in both English and Chinese to KLN Logistics Group Limited. On April 21, 2025, SF Holding's infrastructure public real estate investment trust fund, "China Southern SF Warehousing & Logistics Close-end Infrastructure Fund", was officially listed on the Shenzhen Stock Exchange. On June 25, 2025, SF Holding introduced a new H-shares through its wholly-owned overseas subsidiary on The Stock Exchange of Hong Kong Limited with convertible bonds of HKD 42.15 per share totaling HKD 2.95 billion; the transaction was completed on July 4, 2025, with a total of 70 million (29.2%) new H-shares issued.

In February 2026, SF Airlines signed a 2026 cooperation memorandum with China Cargo Airlines, a subsidiary of EAL; the two parties plan to collaborate on capacity swaps on key routes such as Shanghai Pudong—Los Angeles and Shenzhen—Los Angeles, and jointly develop interline products from Southeast Asia to Europe and the US. In the same month, SF launched an income boost plan for its frontline employees nationwide, investing 200 million RMB to help all couriers increase their income, with an average raise of around 500 RMB per person. In addition, as the end of February, SF Holding had spent nearly 2 billion RMB on share buybacks, repurchasing 50.96 million A-shares, which accounts for 1.01% of its total shares.

== Business ==
=== Express, freight and cold chain ===
SF Holding focuses on the mid- to high-end express delivery market. The company entered the express freight market in 2013. On June 13, 2017, SF Cold Chain Logistics Co., Ltd. was officially established, becoming the first express logistics company in China to establish a nationwide cold chain logistics network.

=== Intra-city on-demand delivery ===
SF Intra-City focuses on on-demand delivery services, with end-to-end instant delivery throughout the city as its core business, providing delivery services for merchants, consumers, couriers and partners. With the rise of e-commerce and live streaming in China, it launched on-demand delivery services combined with e-commerce live streaming. The company was listed on the Hong Kong Stock Exchange in 2021 and was included in the Hong Kong Stock Connect in September 2024.

=== International delivery service ===
Its international logistics service provides end-to-end international direct mail service, including cargo transportation, customs clearance support and logistics tracking functions. This business integrates all-cargo aircraft and flight operation resources, improves transportation and port operation efficiency, and provides services for cross-border e-commerce, international trade and personal delivery. In July 2024, SF International and Amazon Global Store launched a new direct mail service.

=== International freight forwarding services ===
Kerry Logistics (00636.HK) focuses on international logistics services, including full container shipping and international air freight forwarding, providing enterprises with convenient cross-border services. The supply chain service provides end-to-end logistics services, including supply chain consulting, warehouse management, transportation management, supply chain optimization, logistics partnership and other services. Amazon Web Services has announced that SF Supply Chain has partnered with them to develop the intelligent integrated management platform Shuzhi Gate, designed to meet the logistics needs of multi-scenario parks and provide end-to-end supply chain visibility. SF Supply Chain has optimized its logistics solutions to cover inbound logistics, manufacturing logistics, distribution logistics, and service logistics.
