= KLN (company) =

Logistics company based in Hong Kong, China

KLN Logistics Group Limited
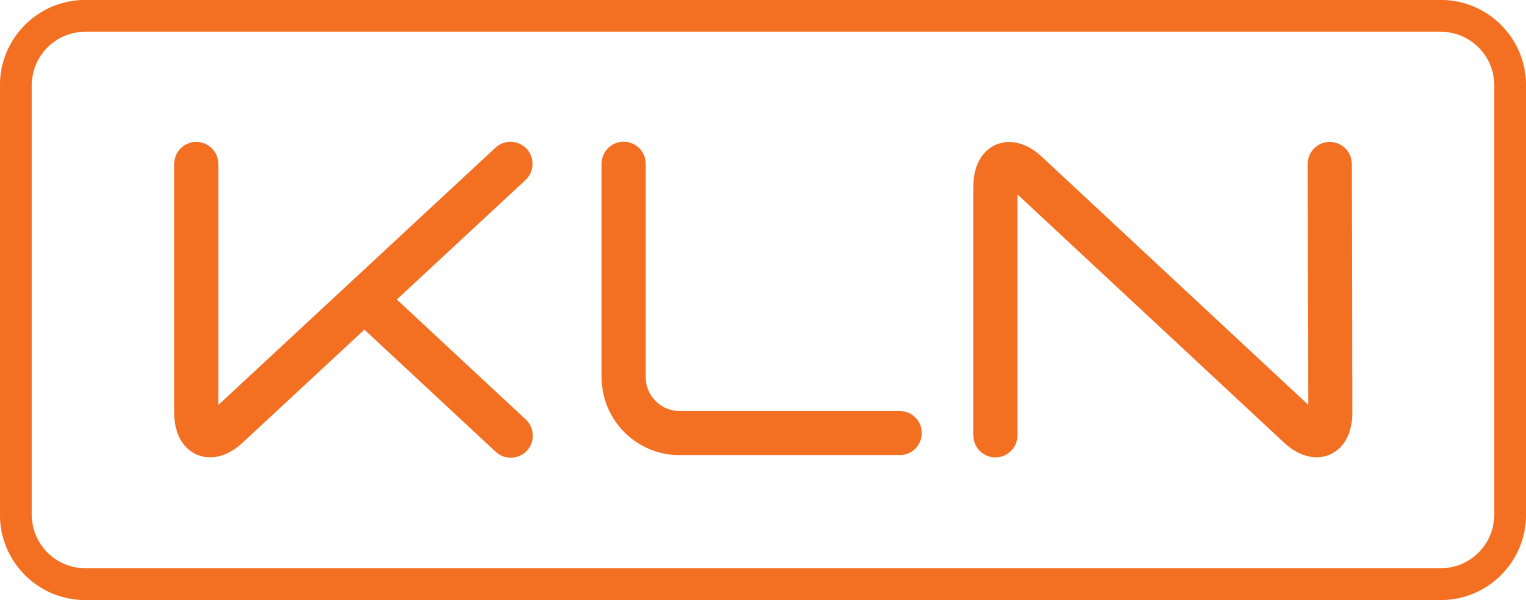
- Type: Public
- Traded as: SEHK: 636
- Industry: Logistics; Transportation; Supply chain management
- Founded: 1981; 45 years ago
- Headquarters: Hong Kong
- Area served: Worldwide
- Key people: Wang Wei (Chairman)
- Services: 3PL; Warehousing; Linehaul; Express delivery; Project cargo
- Revenue: ▲HK$58.4 bn (2024); HK$47.4 bn (2023)
- Number of employees: 18,000+ (2024)
- Parent: SF Holding 51.8% Kerry Properties 12.23%
- Website: kln.com

KLN Logistics Group Limited (KLN), formerly Kerry Logistics, is a listed company on the Hong Kong Stock Exchange and is a constituent of the Hang Seng Corporate Sustainability Benchmark Index.

KLN is an Asia-based, global 3PL with a global presence across 59 countries and territories, including Mainland China, India, Southeast Asia, the CIS, Middle East, LATAM and other locations. The group engages in supply chain solutions from integrated logistics, international freight forwarding (air, ocean, road, rail and multimodal) and e-commerce to industrial project logistics and infrastructure investment.

KLN is headquartered in Kwai Chung, Hong Kong. As of 2020, the company managed 74 million square feet (6,900,000 m^{2}) of logistics facilities globally (24 million square feet [2,200,000 m^{2}] of which is self-owned), with a fleet of over 10,000 self-owned vehicles operating in 59 countries and territories.

== History ==
Before incorporation, its first established warehouse in Hong Kong was built in 1981. By 1991, the Group had five warehouses and acquired one warehouse with an aggregate GFA of approximately 2 million square feet (200,000 m^{2}). The company was established in 1991. In 1999, they opened their flagship logistics facility, Kerry Cargo Centre, a 1.4-million-square-foot (130,000 m^{2}) multi-storey combined logistics facility and global HQ office.

The company name was changed to "Kerry Logistics Network Limited" in 2000, the same year they began to provide truck freight services to warehousing customers. International freight forwarding operations also began shortly after in Hong Kong through the acquisition of Kerry Freight (Hong Kong) Limited (previously named "R&B Transports Limited").

KLN was listed on 19 December 2013, raising over US$280 million, as a spin-off of Kerry Properties Limited. As of 2016, Kerry Logistics owned 12 logistics facilities in Hong Kong with a total GFA of 6.3 million square feet (590,000 m^{2}).

The Group generated a revenue of over HK$53 billion in 2020 and is the largest international logistics company listed on the Hong Kong Stock Exchange (Stock Code 0636.HK) as well as a selected Member of the Hang Seng Corporate Sustainability Index Series 2020–2021. The parent company of SF Express, SF Holding, has acquired a 51.8% stake in KLN, for HKD 17.6 billion in 2021. The company announced the rebranding from Kerry Logistics to KLN in March 2025, and will gradually phase out the use of its Chinese name in favor of "KLN".

== International operations ==
=== Mainland China ===
In 2003, in collaboration with a joint venture partner, the first logistics centre in China was developed. In 2005, the China division acquired a 70% equity interest in EAS, and the new joint entity was renamed Kerry EAS Logistics (KEAS). EAS, a Chinese state-owned enterprise, was one of the leading domestic freight and warehousing entities in China at the time. As of the end of 2016, KEAS managed approximately 5 million square feet (500,000 m^{2}) of self-owned logistics facilities and approximately 8 million square feet (700,000 m^{2}) of leased logistics facilities in China. The revenue in Mainland China was HK$8 billion, or about 38% of the total group revenue.

A joint venture was formed between SF Holding and KLN in 2023 to provide ground handling services for international cargo at Ezhou Huahu International Airport.

=== Taiwan ===
In 2004, KLN commenced freight forwarding operations in Taiwan. In 2008, they acquired an initial equity interest in Kerry TJ Logistics, previously named "T. Join Transportation Co., Ltd". As of the end of 2016, KLN held a total equity interest of approximately 49.67% in Kerry TJ Logistics. Kerry TJ Logistics is a major logistics service provider in Taiwan whose shares have been listed on the Taiwan Stock Exchange since 1990. It has an extensive distribution network supported by a fleet of more than 3,000 trucks.

=== Southeast Asia ===
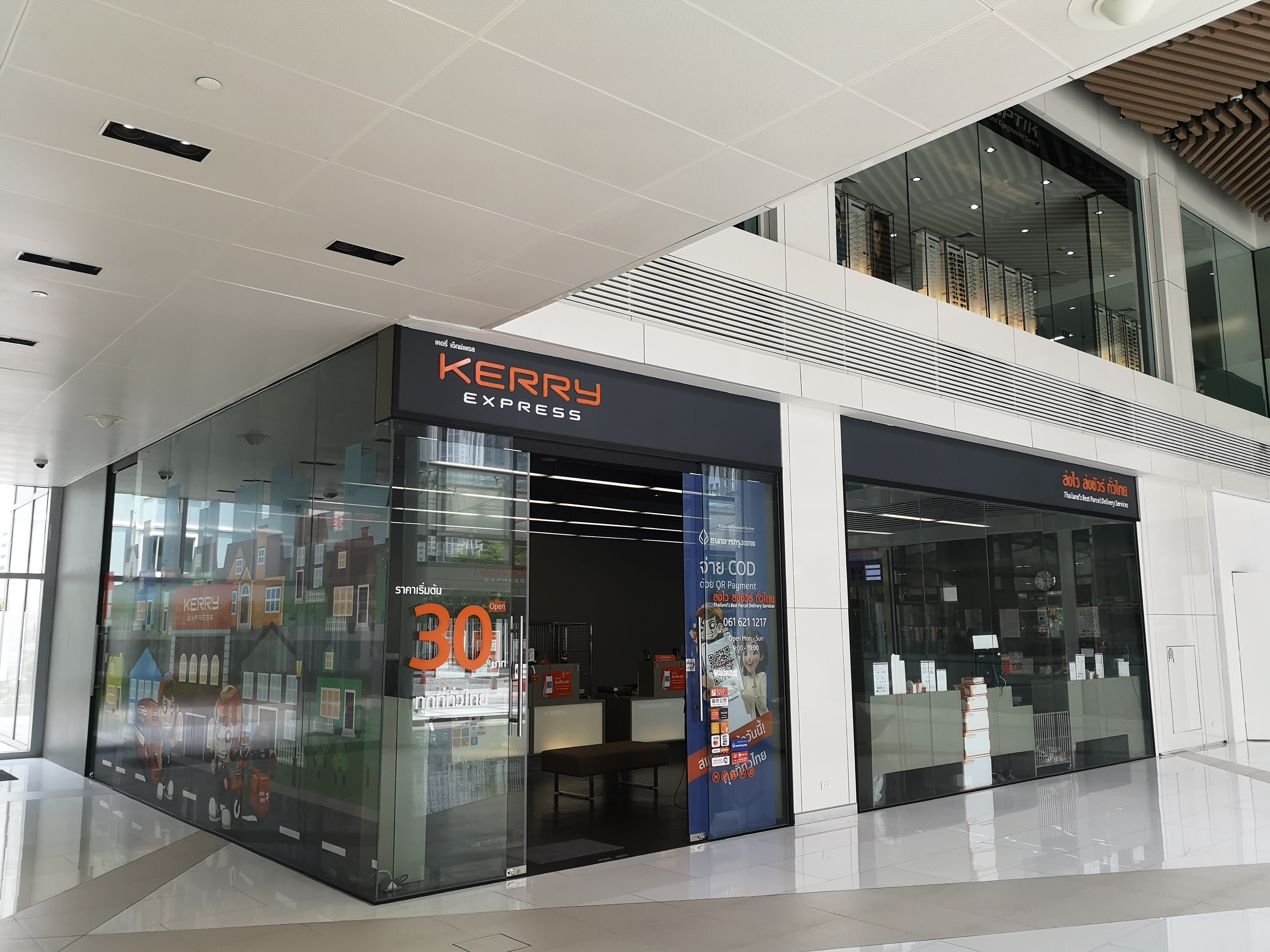
Kerry Express at AIA Capital Center Building in Bangkok.

KLN's business in ASEAN (Southeast Asia) started in 2002, with both integrated logistics and international freight forwarding operations in Thailand. In 2003, KLN completed the development of a logistics centre, with a total GFA of approximately 181,000 square feet (17,000 m^{2}), in Thailand's largest sea port in Laem Chabang, south of Bangkok. In 2004, KLN acquired an initial equity interest in Kerry Siam Seaport Limited (formerly Siam Seaport Terminal & Warehouses Co., Ltd.). As of 2013, KLN holds 79.52% interest in Kerry Siam Seaport Limited. Kerry Siam Seaport Limited operates Kerry Siam Seaport, a multi-purpose port terminal located near Laem Chabang.

Since 2004, KLN has continued to expand into other ASEAN countries by establishing international freight offices in Singapore, Malaysia, Indonesia, Cambodia, the Philippines, Vietnam and Myanmar. As of 2013, KLN managed approximately 6 million square feet (600,000 m^{2}) of completed self-owned facilities (representing an attributable GFA of approximately 4 million square feet [400,000 m^{2}]) and approximately 3 million square feet (300,000 m^{2}) of leased facilities in Thailand where Kerry Logistics trades as Kerry Express.

In March 2024, KLN completed the distribution of its entire shares of KEX Express (Thailand) Public Company Limited, a public company with limited liability registered in Thailand and listed on The Stock Exchange of Thailand (stock code: KEX), in the form of special dividend to Shareholders, and KEX Express Thailand ceased to be a subsidiary of KLN.

=== United Kingdom ===
KLN commenced European freight forwarding operations in the United Kingdom in 2002, by acquiring an initial equity interest in Kerry Logistics (UK) (previously named "Trident International Limited"). In 2013, KLN acquired the remaining equity interest, making Kerry Logistics (UK) a wholly owned subsidiary of KLN.

=== India ===
On 13 April 2016, Kerry Logistics announced the acquisition of a 50% stake in Indev Logistics Pvt. Ltd. (Indev), a Chennai-based logistics company. The stake value is estimated to be around Rs 1,000 crore. By 2018, the company is also planning to list in the Indian markets. Once this investment plan takes effect, Indev will be rebranded as Kerry-INDEV, in line with Kerry's ambition to becoming a major pan-Indian logistics company with an India focus.

== See also ==
- Kerry Properties Limited
