= One Air =

British cargo airline

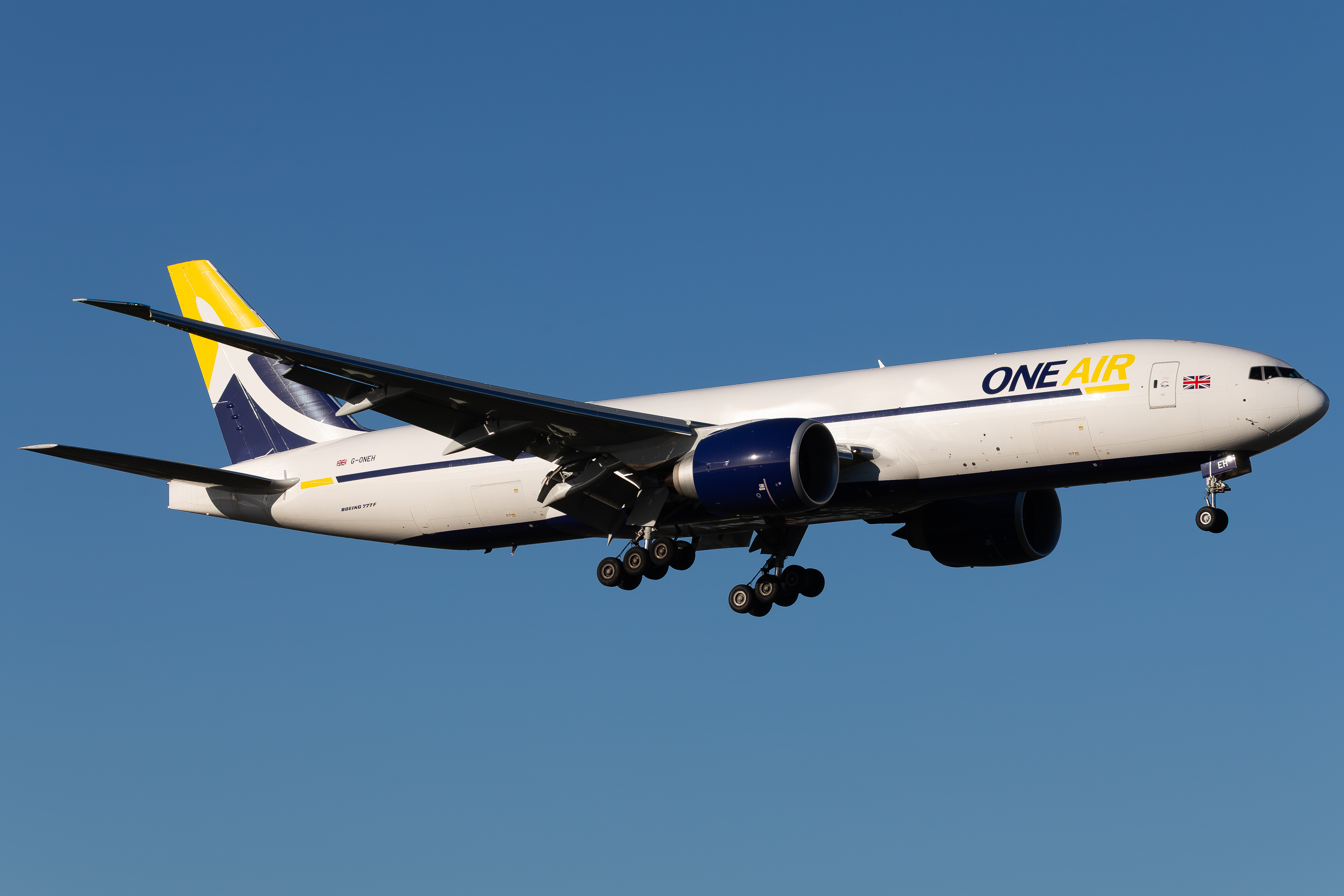
IATA	ICAO	Call sign
HE	HGO	HAMPTON
- Founded: 2021
- Commenced operations: 24 July 2023
- Hubs: East Midlands
- Focus cities: Hong Kong, Hangzhou, Zhengzhou, Ezhou
- Fleet size: 5
- Headquarters: Hampton Wick
- Key people: Paul Bennett, Jon Hartley, Chris Hope, Guneet Mirchandani
- Founder: Paul Bennett
- Website: oneair.aero

One Air Ltd is a British cargo charter airline founded in 2021. Beginning its operations in July 2023, the airline operates two Boeing 747-400BDSFs, one Boeing 747-400F and two Boeing 777Fs on charter flights primarily to China and Hong Kong with technical stops in Muscat, Oman and in Astana, Kazakhstan. It is part of Air One International Holdings, a group consisting of Air One Aviation, Aerotranscargo, and One Air.

In August 2025, One Air took delivery of its first new Boeing 777F (G-ONEG) on lease from Aerotranscargo, which entered service the following September. It took delivery of a second 777 in November of that year.

The airline flew its first commercial flight on 22 July 2023, operating from London Heathrow to Jinan Yaoqiang International Airport. Operations later moved to East Midlands Airport.

The Chinese logistics company SF Express partnered with Air One for a one-year charter agreement in November 2025, with four scheduled weekly flights between Ezhou Huahu International Airport and East Midlands Airport.

== Fleet ==
As of February 2026, One Air operates the following aircraft:

One Air fleet
Aircraft	In service	Orders	Passengers	Notes
Boeing 747-400BDSF	2	—		
Boeing 747-400ERF	1	—		
Boeing 777F	2	—		
Total	5	0		
