= East Midlands Airport =

Airport in Leicestershire, England

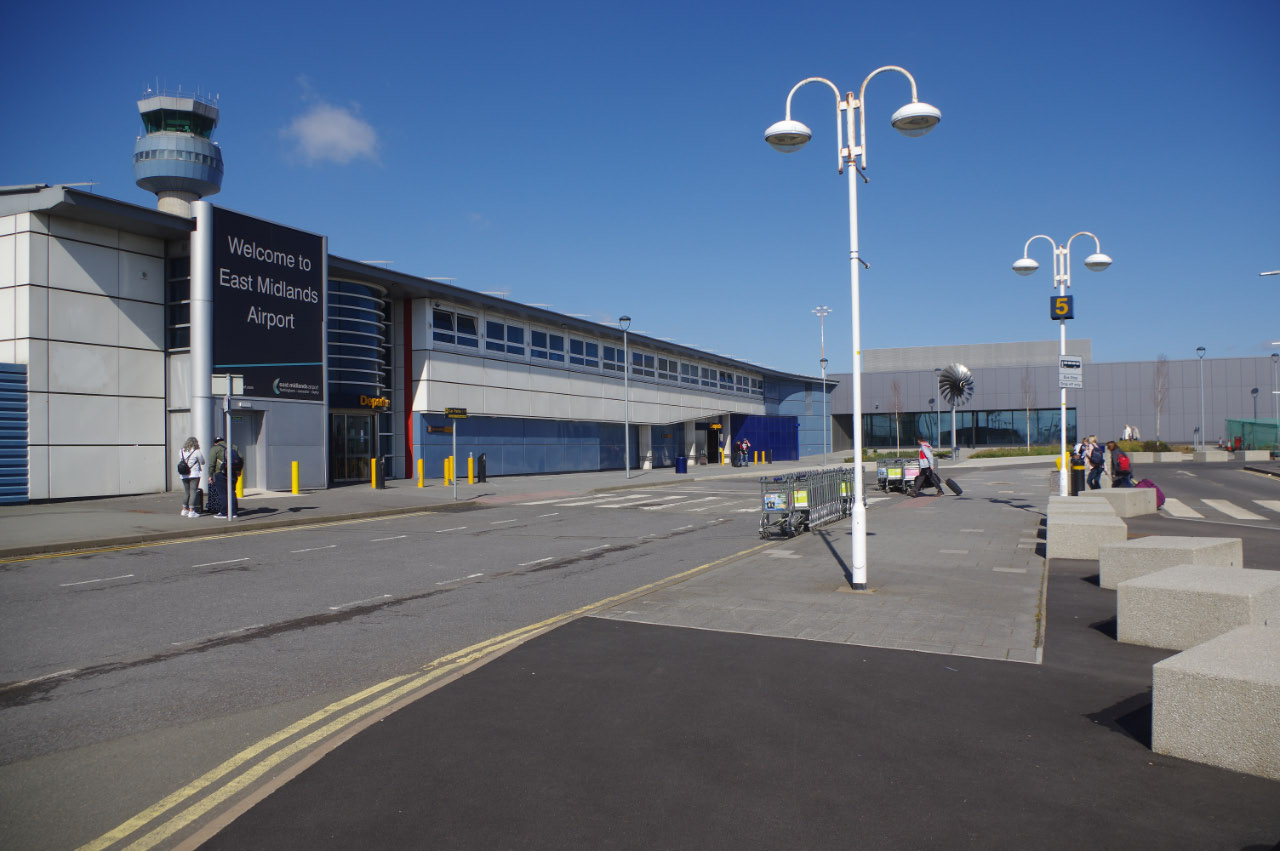
- IATA: EMA; ICAO: EGNX

Summary
- Airport type: Public
- Owner/Operator: Manchester Airports Group
- Serves: East Midlands
- Location: Castle Donington, Leicestershire, England
- Opened: April 1965; 61 years ago
- Hub for: DHL Aviation; UPS Airlines
- Operating base for: Jet2.com; Ryanair; TUI Airways
- Built: 1943; 83 years ago
- Elevation AMSL: 306 ft (93 m)
- Coordinates: 52°50′N 001°20′W
- Website: www.eastmidlandsairport.com

Map
- Location in Leicestershire EMA/EGNX (the United Kingdom)

Runways
Direction	Length		Surface
Direction	m	ft	Surface
09/27	2,893	9,491	Asphalt

Statistics (2022)
- Passengers: 3,186,367
- Passenger change 21-22: ▲283%
- Aircraft movements: 46,730
- Movements change 21-22: ▲32%
- Sources: UK AIP at NATS; Statistics from the UK Civil Aviation Authority

East Midlands Airport (IATA: EMA, ICAO: EGNX) is an international airport in Castle Donington, Leicestershire, England. The airport is situated between Loughborough (10 miles (16 km)), Derby (12.5 miles (20 km)) and Nottingham (14 miles (23 km)); Leicester is 20 miles (32 km) to the south and Lincoln 43 miles (69 km) northeast. It serves the majority of the East Midlands region consisting of the counties of Leicestershire, Nottinghamshire, Lincolnshire, Rutland and Derbyshire. The airfield was originally built as a Royal Air Force station known as RAF Castle Donington in 1943, before being redeveloped as a civilian airport in 1965.

East Midlands Airport has established itself as a hub for low-fare airlines such as Ryanair and tour operators like Jet2 and TUI Airways, which serve a range of domestic and European short-haul destinations. In 2022, the airport was the 14th-busiest airport in the UK by passenger traffic. A central air cargo hub, it was the second-busiest UK airport for freight traffic in 2016, after London Heathrow.

The airport is owned by the Manchester Airports Group (MAG), the largest British-owned airport operator, which is controlled by the ten metropolitan borough councils of Greater Manchester, with Manchester City Council retaining the controlling stake.

== History ==
=== RAF Castle Donington ===
RAF Castle Donington was opened as a Royal Air Force station in 1943, during the Second World War. The airfield was equipped with three concrete runways, together with two hangars, and was a satellite airfield to RAF Wymeswold, situated some 9 miles (14 km) to the southeast. Initially, the airfield was used by the 28 Operational Training Unit, training RAF Bomber Command crews on the Vickers Wellington, and subsequently by the 108 Operational Training Unit, later renamed 1382 Transport Conversion Unit, training RAF Transport Command crews on the Douglas Dakota. The airfield closed and the air force station was decommissioned in 1946.

=== East Midlands Airport ===
A group of local government agencies bought the former RAF station site in 1964, at which point a sizeable construction and runway investment programme was launched. The airfield was renamed East Midlands Airport to reflect the area it served, and it opened for passengers in April 1965, replacing the redundant Derby Airport.

Until 1982, when the head office moved to Donington Hall, British Midland had its head office on the airport property. BMI also had its maintenance base at the airport.

In 1993, National Express purchased the airport from the local councils. With Bournemouth Airport, it was sold to Manchester Airports Group in February 2001. In 2004 the airport was controversially renamed Nottingham East Midlands Airport. The change, however, did not last long, and on 8 December 2006, the airport's name was restored to East Midlands Airport.

EasyJet ceased operating from the airport on 5 January 2010. However, it was announced on 13 April 2011 that Bmibaby would close its Manchester and Cardiff bases, moving an additional service to East Midlands Airport with increased frequencies and new routes for summer 2012. It was announced only just over a year later, on 3 May 2012, that Bmibaby would close down and cease all operations in September 2012, with a number of services being dropped from June. The parent company, International Airlines Group, cited heavy losses and the failure to find a suitable buyer as the reasons for the decision. In light of the announcement, Flybe and Monarch Airlines announced they would establish a base at the airport, and low-cost airline Jet2.com confirmed they would also expand their operations from the airport, with new routes and an additional aircraft from the summer of 2013. In 2015, the airport announced jet2.com would base a seventh aircraft at East Midlands Airport in the summer period. Ryanair expanded its East Midlands base with a series of new routes and frequency increases on existing routes. Ryanair became the largest airline at the airport, accounting for about 50% of passenger traffic, with East Midlands now being Ryanair's third-largest UK airport, after London Stansted and Manchester, both now also owned by MAG.

In 2016, Heathrow handled 1.54 million tonnes of freight and mail, compared with 300,100 tonnes in East Midlands. DHL Aviation has a large purpose-built facility at EMA, and courier companies UPS and PostNL use the airport as a base to import and export freight.

=== Development since 2020 ===
On 4 March 2020, Flybe entered administration, with EMA announcing that all flights were cancelled with immediate effect, the following day.

In the summer of 2020, Aer Lingus announced they would commence flights to Belfast, operated by Stobart Air, taking over the route which was once operated by Flybe, until their collapse in early 2020. In June 2021, Stobart Air collapsed, ceasing the route. Later in the month, EasyJet announced they would take over the Belfast route, operating frequent flights to Belfast International Airport. This was the first easyJet route announced from East Midlands since they stopped services from the airport in January 2010.

== Airlines and destinations ==
=== Passenger ===
The following airlines operate regular scheduled passenger flights to and from East Midlands:

Airlines	Destinations
Aer Lingus	Belfast–City
Jet2.com	Alicante, Antalya, Faro, Fuerteventura, Funchal, Gran Canaria, Hurghada (begins 13 February 2027), Lanzarote, Málaga, Malta, Paphos, Paris–Charles de Gaulle (begins 26 March 2027), Sharm El Sheikh (begins 12 February 2027), Tenerife–South; Seasonal: Agadir, Berlin, Bodrum, Budapest, Burgas, Chania, Corfu, Dalaman, Dubrovnik, Enfidha (begins 1 May 2027), Gdańsk (begins 27 November 2026), Geneva, Girona, Heraklion, Ibiza, İzmir, Jersey, Kefalonia, Kos, Kraków, Larnaca, Menorca, Naples, Palma de Mallorca, Prague, Preveza/Lefkada, Pula, Reus, Rhodes, Skiathos, Thessaloniki, Verona, Vienna, Zakynthos
Loganair	Seasonal: Jersey
Ryanair	Alicante, Belfast–International, Dublin, Faro, Fuerteventura, Gran Canaria, Knock, Kraków, Lanzarote, Málaga, Riga, Tenerife–South, Wrocław; Seasonal: Barcelona, Bergamo, Bergerac, Berlin, Budapest, Carcassonne, Chania, Corfu, Girona, Limoges, Malta, Menorca, Murcia, Palma de Mallorca, Prague, Reus, Rhodes, Rome–Ciampino, Treviso, Valencia
TUI Airways	Alicante, Gran Canaria, Hurghada, Lanzarote, Málaga, Sharm El Sheikh, Tenerife–South; Seasonal: Antalya, Boa Vista, Corfu, Dalaman, Dubrovnik, Faro, Heraklion, Ibiza, Kefalonia, Kittilä, Kos, Larnaca, Menorca, Naples, Palma de Mallorca, Paphos, Rhodes, Sal, Skiathos, Turin, Zakynthos

=== Cargo ===
Airlines	Destinations
Atlas Air	Anchorage, Frankfurt, Hangzhou
Central Airlines	Chengdu–Shuangliu, Tianjin
DHL Aviation	Aberdeen, Almaty, Bahrain, Belfast–International, Bologna, Brussels, Cincinnati, Cologne/Bonn, Copenhagen, Dubai–International, Dublin, Edinburgh, Leipzig/Halle, London–Luton, Los Angeles, Madrid, Milan–Malpensa, Munich, New York–JFK, Paris–Charles de Gaulle, Reykjavík–Keflavík, Shannon, Vitoria
Ethiopian Cargo	Hong Kong, Oslo
Etihad Cargo	Abu Dhabi
FedEx Express	Belfast–International, Paris–Charles de Gaulle
Maersk Air Cargo	Belfast–International, Cologne/Bonn, Edinburgh
MNG Airlines	Istanbul
One Air	Dubai–International
Saudia Cargo	Riyadh
SF Airlines	Ezhou
UPS Airlines	Belfast–International, Cologne/Bonn, Edinburgh, Philadelphia

The three logistics giants, DHL Aviation, UPS Airlines and FedEx, have chosen EMA as their main UK hub, forming part of their US-UK-Europe network.

The airport saw a 10% increase (17,500 tonnes) in cargo volumes for the first half of 2025 compared to the first half of 2024. In early 2025, EMA attracted new cargo airlines primarily operating China-UK routes in response to a growth in e-commerce, supporting growth at the airport for ground handlers Swissport and FedEx.

EMA has Freeport tax sites on its airfield and south of the airport, which have been earmarked for development as part of EMA's cargo growth plan. This aims to meet a forecast 54% rise in cargo volumes to 2043 with the development of up to 122,000m2 of warehousing and associated apron space.

== Statistics ==
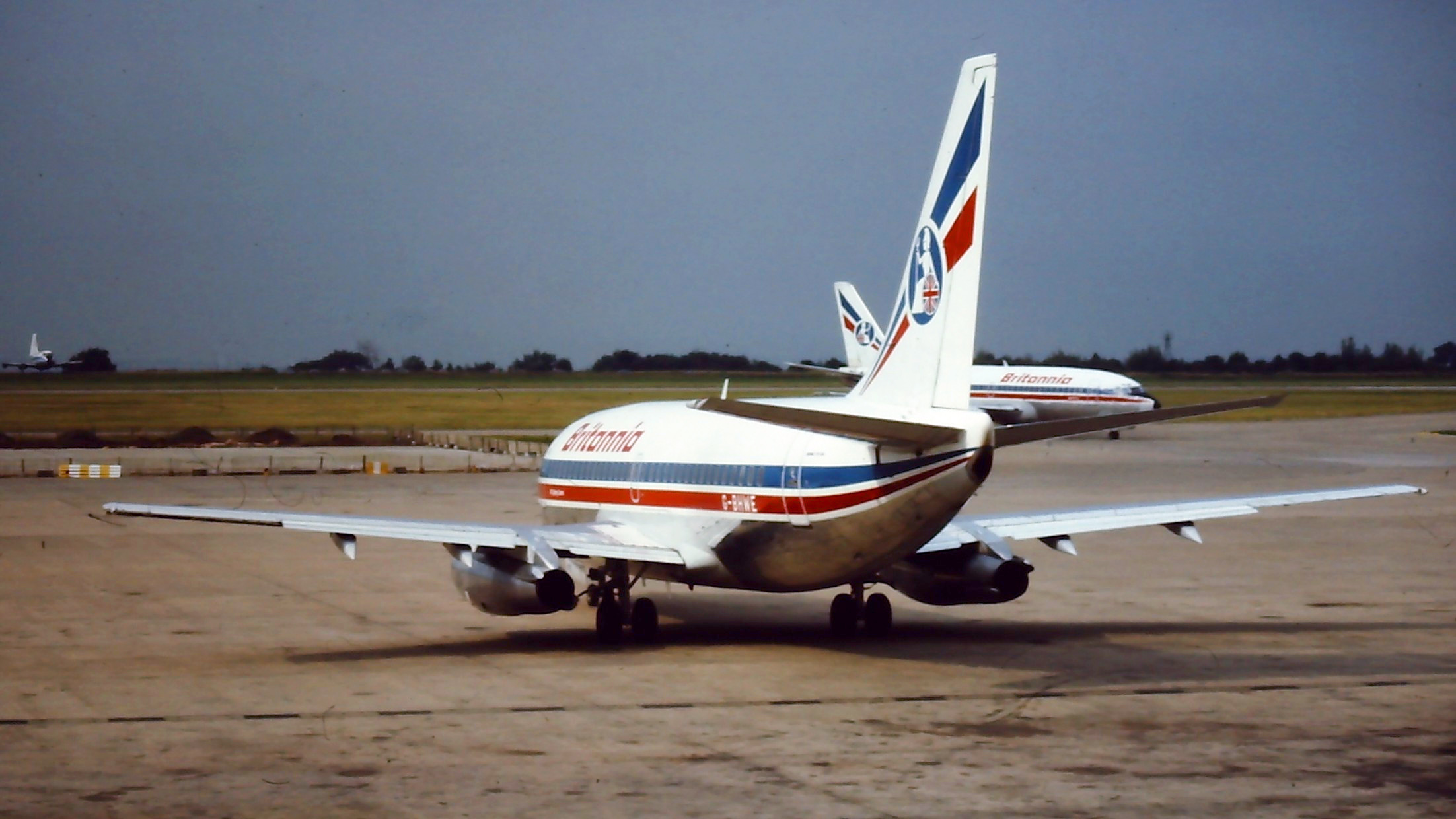
A Britannia Airways Boeing 737-200 at East Midlands Airport in 1982.

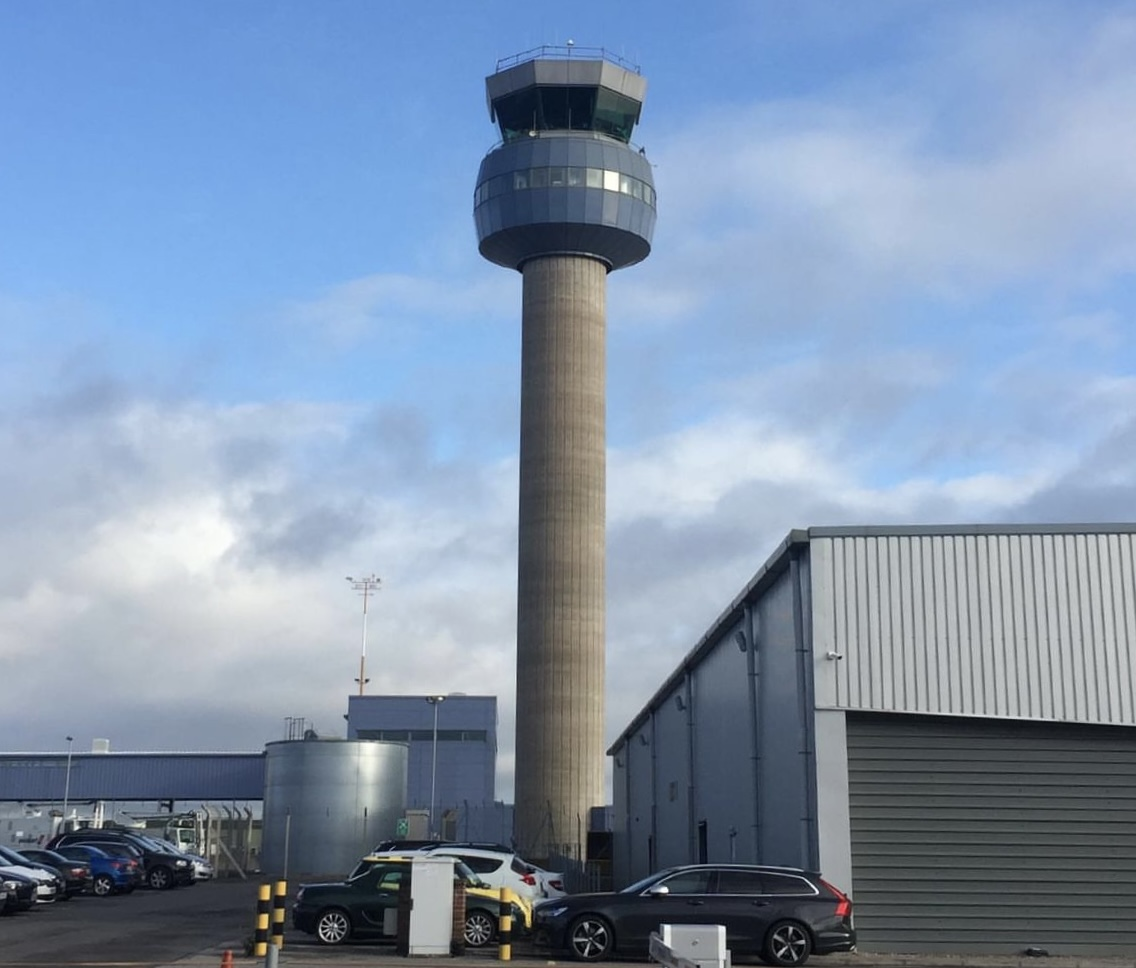
The air traffic control tower at East Midlands airport, located at the south of the airfield, next to the terminal.

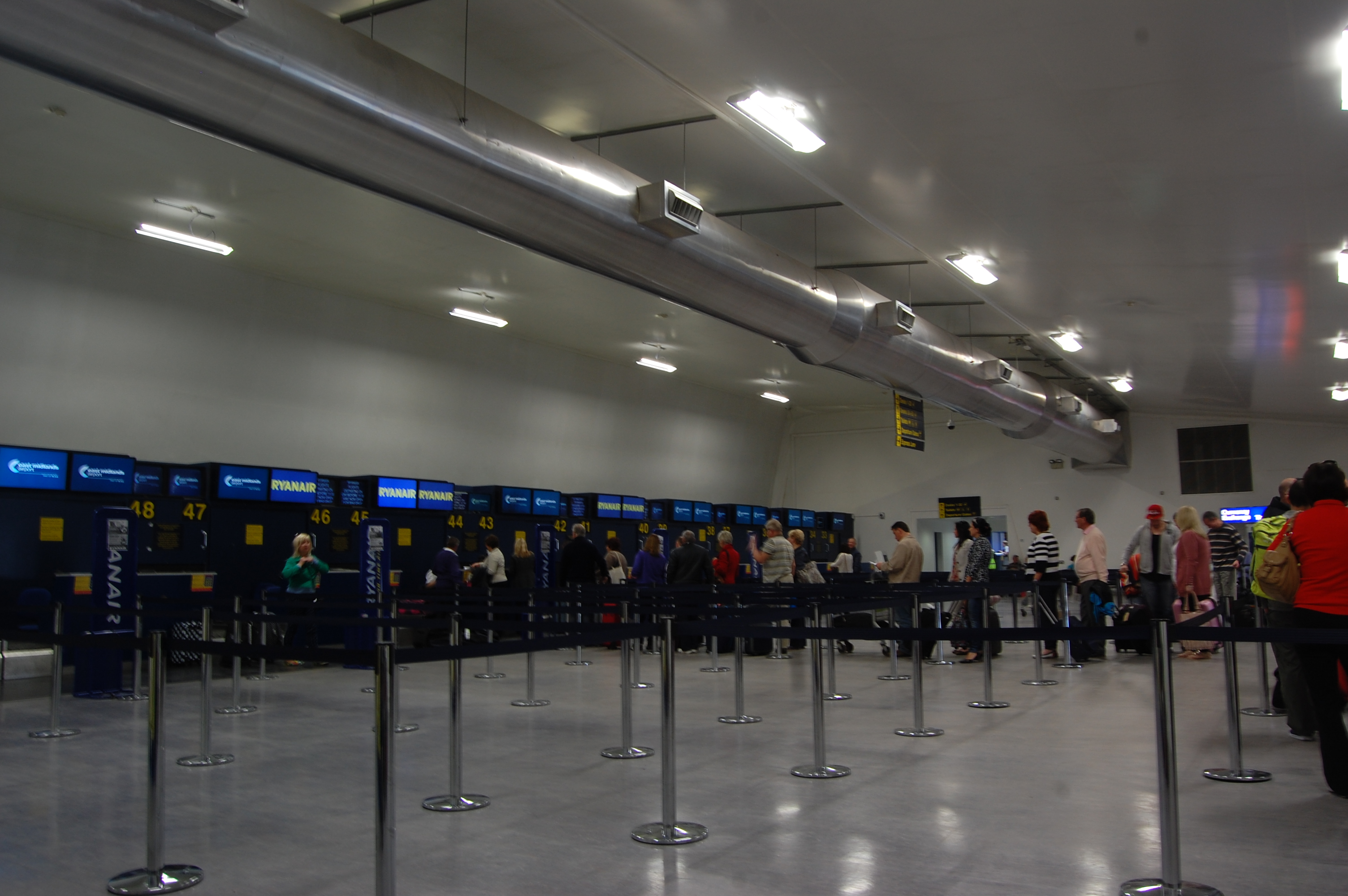
The check-in hall at the airport.

Busiest routes to and from East Midlands (2025)
Rank	Airport	Total passengers	Change 2024 / 25
1	Alicante	369,184	▲1.4%
2	Tenerife–South	318,561	▲1.2%
3	Palma de Mallorca	296,820	▼4.9%
4	Málaga	275,114	▼0.9%
5	Lanzarote	219,633	▼1.9%
6	Faro	212,100	▲4.4%
7	Dublin	149,810	▼6.4%
8	Gran Canaria	123,677	▲5.5%
9	Rhodes	103,032	▲15.3%
10	Kraków	93,047	▲4.9%

== Other facilities ==
Pegasus Business Park, an office complex, is on the airport grounds. The now-defunct airline flybmi formerly had its head office at Pegasus Business Park.

== Ground transport ==
=== Motorway ===
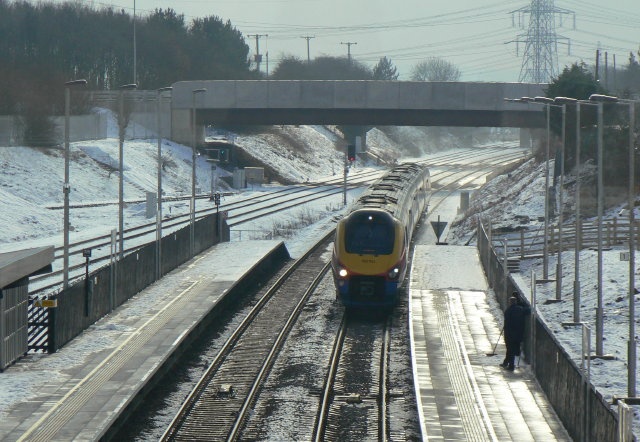
East Midlands Parkway railway station.

The airport has excellent connections to the motorway network, as it is near the intersection of the M1, A42 and A50 at Donington Park, bringing the airfield within easy reach of the major population centres of the Midlands. The A46 is also within reach for journeys to the rest of the East Midlands.

=== Drop-off fees ===
The airport introduced a charge to drop car passengers near the departure lounge in 2010.

=== Railway ===
The nearest railway station is East Midlands Parkway, four miles (six kilometres) away, with regular services to Leicester, Derby, Sheffield, Lincoln, Nottingham and London St Pancras. The original shuttle bus service linking the station and the airport ceased not long after it was introduced, but in 2015 an hourly minibus service was reintroduced by Elite Cars, restoring scheduled shuttle services to and from the airport. Connections to the airport via taxi are also available.

A dedicated railway station at the airport is proposed, which would be connected to the existing network via a spur from the Midland Main Line. If the project goes ahead, it is expected to be complete by 2040 and will offer direct services to nearby cities as well as the existing East Midlands Parkway railway station. A new line to the airport on the Nottingham Express Transit network is also proposed, planned to be open by 2045.

A 700-acre (280 ha) railfreight terminal, East Midlands Gateway, opened on the SEGRO Logistics Park to the north of the airport in 2020, so that the site is now served by air, road and rail cargo. As of December 2021, this was handling 10,000 shipping containers, with trains to ports including Felixstowe, London Gateway, Southampton and Liverpool.

=== Bus ===
Bus services are provided by Trent Barton towards Nottingham, Long Eaton, Coalville and Ilkeston with sister company Kinchbus serving Leicester, Loughborough and Derby. They also operate the Demand Response service operating around West Rushcliffe on behalf of Nottinghamshire County Council. Diamond East Midlands provides a service to Burton-upon-Trent via Swadlincote and Ashby-de-la-Zouch. There is also a shuttle bus service to connect the terminal to the car parks, which is run by FirstGroup.

== East Midlands Aeropark ==
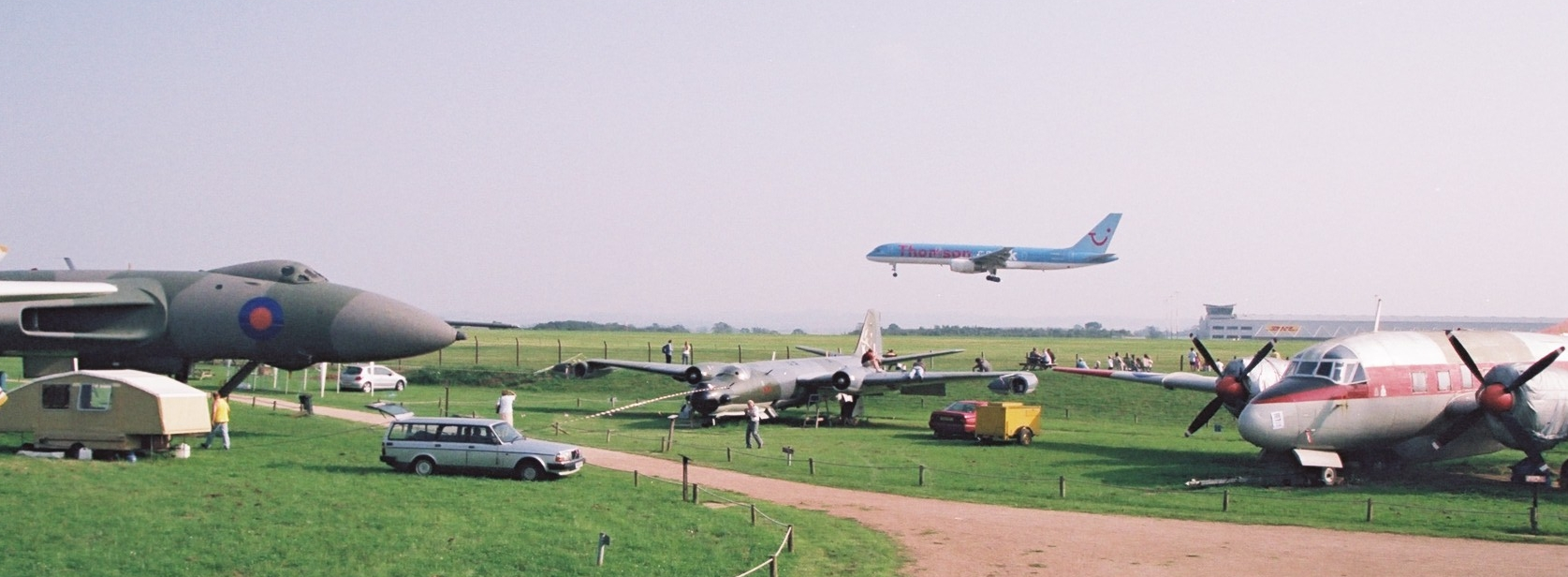
The Aeropark at East Midlands Airport

The East Midlands Aeropark to the north west corner of the airport has a large number of static aircraft on public display, the majority of which are from British manufacturers. The museum and its exhibits are managed and maintained by the Aeropark Volunteers Association (AVA). It also offers two viewing mounds for watching aircraft arriving and departing from the main runway. AVA Members are allowed free access to the Aeropark. Exhibits include an Aérospatiale Gazelle, a de Havilland Vampire and an English Electric Canberra amongst several others.

== Accidents and incidents ==
- On 20 February 1969, Vickers Viscount G-AODG of British Midland Airways was damaged beyond economic repair when it landed short of the runway. There were no casualties.
- On 31 January 1986, Aer Lingus Flight 328, a Short 360, en route from Dublin, struck power lines and crashed short of the runway. None of the 36 passengers and crew died but two passengers were injured in the accident.
- On 18 January 1987, a British Midland Fokker F27 Friendship, on a training flight, crashed on approach to East Midlands Airport due to wing and tail surface icing. There were no fatalities.
- On 8 January 1989, British Midland Flight 92 crashed on approach to East Midlands Airport, killing 47 people. The Boeing 737 aircraft had developed a fan blade failure in one of the two engines while en route from London Heathrow to Belfast and a decision was made to divert to East Midlands. The crew mistakenly shut down the functioning engine, causing the aircraft to lose power and crash on the embankment of the M1 Motorway just short of the runway. No one on the ground was injured and no vehicles were damaged despite the aircraft crashing on the embankment of one of the busiest sections of motorway in the UK. The investigation into the Kegworth air disaster, as the incident became known, led to considerable improvements in aircraft safety and emergency instructions for passengers. The official report into the disaster made 31 safety recommendations.
- On 29 October 2010, in the 2010 cargo plane bomb plot, British police searched a UPS plane at East Midlands Airport but found nothing. Later that day, when a package was found on a plane in Dubai, United Arab Emirates, British officials searched again and found a bomb. The two packages, found on two planes originating in Yemen, contained the powerful high explosive PETN. The UK and the US determined that the plan was to detonate them while in flight. Al-Qaeda in the Arabian Peninsula took responsibility.
