= Wang Wei (SF Express) =

Chinese billionaire entrepreneur (born 1970)

- Born: October 1970 (age 55); Shanghai, China
- Occupation: Businessperson
- Known for: Founder of SF Express, chairman of SF Holding
- Children: 3

Chinese name
- Simplified Chinese: 王卫
- Traditional Chinese: 王衛
Transcriptions
Standard Mandarin
- Hanyu Pinyin: Wáng Wèi
Yue: Cantonese
- Jyutping: Wong^{4} Wai^{6}

Wang Wei (Chinese: 王卫; pinyin: Wáng Wèi; born October 1970), also known as Dick Wang, is a Chinese billionaire entrepreneur, who is the founder and chairman of SF Express, a Shenzhen-based multinational delivery services and logistics company.

As of August 2026, his net worth was estimated at US$15.3 billion. He remains chairman and majority shareholder of the Chinese conglomerate SF Holding.

== Early life ==
Wang Wei was born in Shanghai, China in 1971. His father was a Russian language translator for the Chinese Air Force, and his mother was a university professor. As a child, he moved to Hong Kong with his family, at age 7, where he attended primary and secondary school. After graduating, Wang did not go to university, but instead went to work in the manufacturing sector.

== Career ==
=== Founding SF Express (1990s-2000) ===
Wang's career started in print and dyeing factories in Shunde District, Foshan, a commercial and manufacturing center in Guangdong province with easy river access to Hong Kong. In the early 1990s, factories in Shunde needed to get samples to Hong Kong-based buyers, but frequently had issues with long shipping delays. To speed up this process, Wang founded ShunFeng Express as a small courier service with six employees. He started the business in a shop in Mong Kok, in the Kowloon district in 1993, using US$13,000 loaned from his father as startup money. The company initially had six delivery drivers, with Wang among them, and one van. Weeks in China reported that SF Express was one of the earliest parallel traders to cross the Hong Kong-Shenzhen border.

=== SF Holding expansion (2001-2026) ===
By 2014, he had been reported in the press to be a billionaire. The South China Morning Post reports that he declined all media interviews until 2011. As of 2017, SF Express was a multinational courier service with over 400,000 employees. He took SF Holding public through a reverse merger on the Shenzhen Stock Exchange in March 2017, with Wei becoming one of the three richest businesspeople in China, with US$26.5 billion in value according to the Bloomberg Billionaires Index. By 2020, SF Express also operated the cargo airline arm SF Airlines. In 2022, he owned a 68% stake in SF Express, remaining the third richest businessperson in China.

As of February 2024, his net worth was estimated at US$13.5 billion. SF Holding listed publicly in Hong Kong in 2024. As of August 8, 2026, Forbes listed his wealth at $15.3 billion, ranking him #199 in the world. He remains chairman of S.F. Holding, the parent of SF Express, and majority owner of SF Holding as well.

== Personal life ==
Wang lives in Shenzhen, China.

== See also ==
- List of Chinese by net worth
