= Wuxi Boston International School =

International school in Wuxi, China

Wuxi Boston International School (BIS) is an international school located in Xinwu District in Wuxi, China. BIS was opened in the 2017–2018 school year. Enrollment is open to students from pre-kindergarten to grade 12.

BIS follows the International Baccalaureate curriculum. Brian Rotunno was the Academic Principal from 2019 to 2023. BIS is accredited through WASC.
