= Jade Cargo International =

Cargo airline of China (2004–2011)

Jade Cargo International 翡翠国际货运航空公司 Fěicùi Guójì Huòyùn Hángkōng Gōngsī

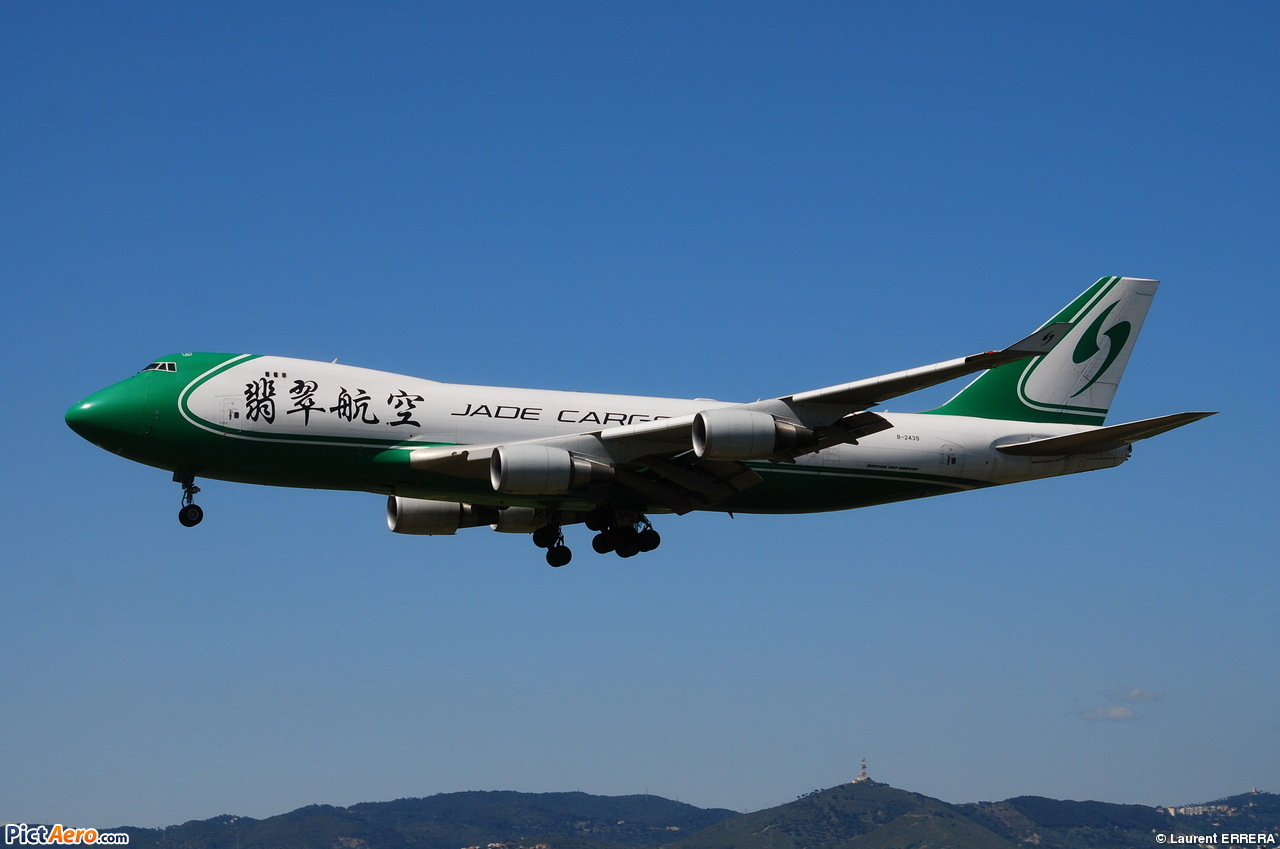
- Jade Cargo International Boeing 747-400ERF in 2009
IATA	ICAO	Call sign
JI	JAE	JADE CARGO
- Founded: August 2004
- Commenced operations: 5 August 2006
- Ceased operations: December 2011
- Hubs: Shenzhen; Shanghai–Pudong
- Fleet size: 6
- Destinations: 10
- Parent company: Jade Cargo International Company Ltd.
- Headquarters: Shenzhen Bao'an International Airport; Bao'an, Shenzhen, Guangdong, China
- Key people: Feng Gang (Chairman of the Board); Frank Naeve (CEO)
- Website: www.jadecargo.com

Jade Cargo International was a cargo airline with its headquarters on the sixth floor of the Shenzhen Airlines Flight Operations Building at Shenzhen Bao'an International Airport, Bao'an District, Shenzhen, Guangdong, China. It operated regular cargo services to Asia, Europe, South East Asia and the Middle East, plus a host of other worldwide destinations. It main base was Shenzhen Bao'an International Airport.

== History ==
Jade Cargo International was established in October 2004 and was co-owned by Shenzhen Airlines, which had a 51% stake; Lufthansa Cargo with 25%; and DEG – Deutsche Investitions- und Entwicklungsgesellschaft mbH, a subsidiary of German state-owned bank KfW – with 24%. It started operations in August 2006. It was the first cargo airline in China with foreign ownership and had 350 employees (as of March 2009).

On December 25, 2011, Jade Cargo International flew its last scheduled flight, as JI7466 from Frankfurt (FRA) to Shanghai (PVG), via Shenyang (SHE). A few days later, on December 31, 2011, the airline officially grounded its fleet, citing a combination of lack of demand and "extended discussions" with Jade Cargo's other owners, with the service suspension lasting for several weeks until new funding was to be found through UniTop Group, which had plans to restructure the airline.

Late in May 2012, UniTop withdrew its Letter of Intent (LOI) for the restructuring plans. Jade Cargo International leadership subsequently announced the closure of the company and the start of liquidation proceedings effective June 4, 2012.

In 2017, three former Jade Cargo Boeing 747 planes (B-2421, B-2422, and B-2423) were up for auction on Taobao. On 20 November 2017, SF Airlines purchased two of the three Boeing 747 planes on Taobao, each for over ¥160,000,000 Chinese Yuan.

== Fleet ==
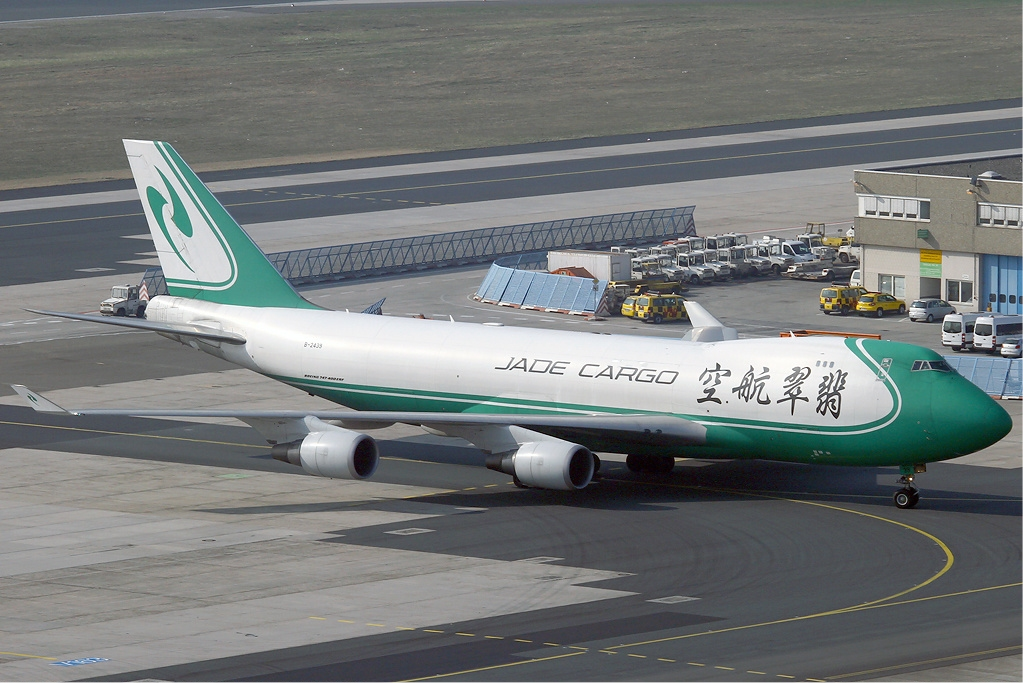
Jade Cargo International Boeing 747-400ERF in 2011.

The Jade Cargo International fleet consisted of the following aircraft (as of June 2015):

Jade Cargo International Fleet
Aircraft	In fleet	Order	Notes
Boeing 747-400ERF	2	—	Disposed to CAL Cargo Air Lines
Boeing 747-400ERF	2	—	Disposed to SF Airlines
Boeing 747-400ERF	1	—	Disposed to AirBridgeCargo
Boeing 747-400ERF	1	—	Disposed to Southern Air

== See also ==
- Shenzhen Airlines
- Lufthansa Cargo
