= China (Wuxi) University Tech Park of Sensing Network =

Science park in Wuxi, Jiangsu, China

Founded on February 25, 2010, the China (Wuxi) University Tech Park of Sensing Network is the first professional high-tech park focusing on research on sensing network in China. It is located in the Taihu International Tech-Park in Wuxi, Jiangsu province and is the only national-level university technology park themed on sensing network.

== Background ==
In 2008, the city of Wuxi in Jiangsu province launched the first professional sensing network focused on nanotechnology, and the first R&D center for sensing network. With cooperation with the China Academy of Sciences, the city has also established an R&D center of high-end nanotechnology and sensing network engineering technology.

Relied on the teaching faculty and technologies of colleges and research institutes, the park is expected to accelerate the integration of industries related to the Internet of Things by incorporating innovation and talents. It also strives to become an incubator for the commercialization of research findings and to lead the transformation of traditional industries and the upgrading of product variations.

== Development ==
In September 2014, the park was approved as a national-level university technology park by the Ministry of Science and Technology and the Ministry of Education.

The Beijing University of Posts and Telecommunications Wuxi research institute of sensing technology is the first institute opening in the park. As of December 12, 2015, the park has collected 12 cooperative units with 10 colleges in China, including Tsinghua University, Shanghai Jiao Tong University, Nanjing University and Southeast University, and 230 enterprises related to the Sensing Network.

== See also ==
- Wuxi Software Park
