= Ezhou Huahu International Airport =

Airport in Hubei, China

Ezhou Huahu International Airport 鄂州花湖国际机场
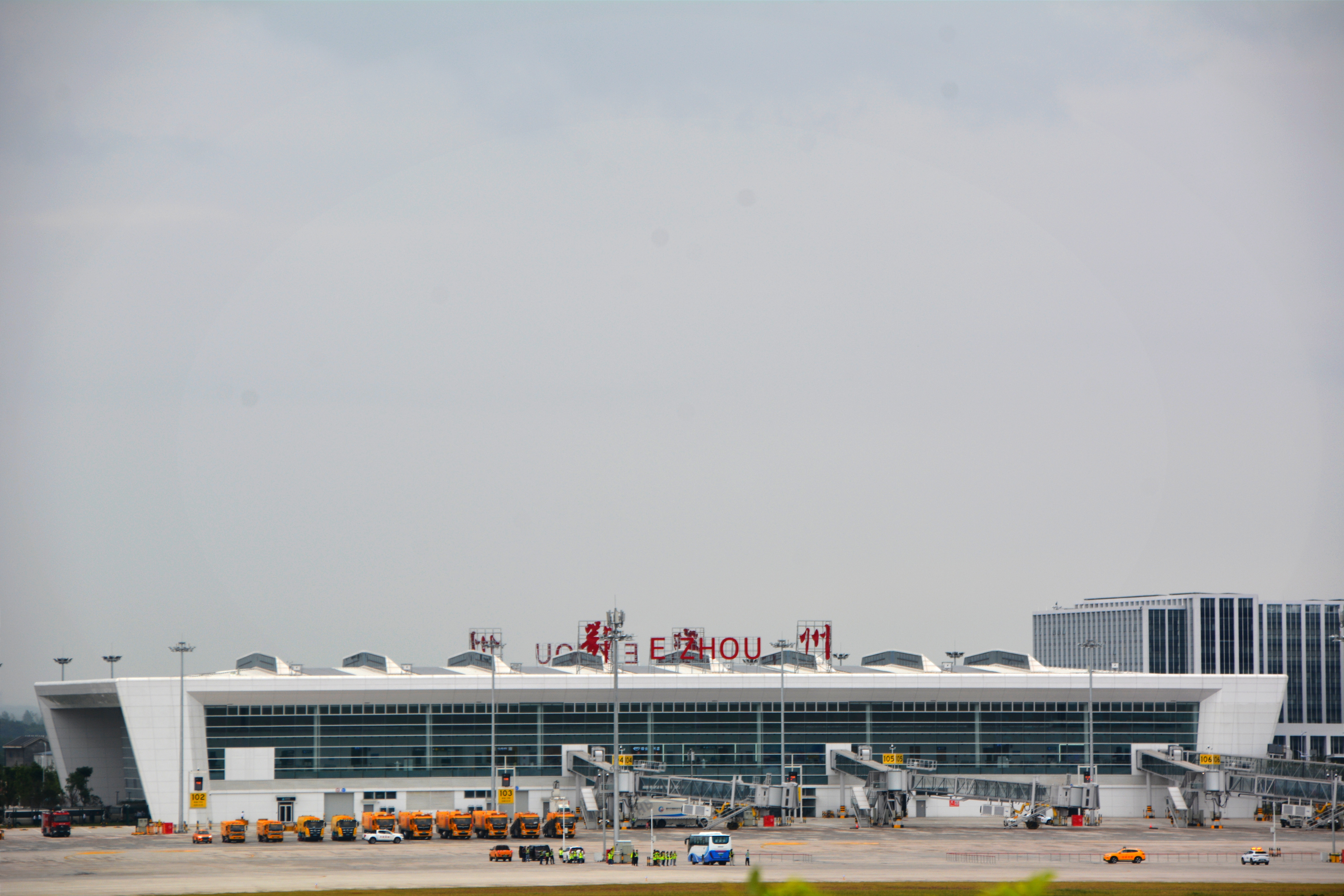
- IATA: EHU; ICAO: ZHEC

Summary
- Airport type: Public
- Serves: Ezhou; Huanggang; Huangshi; Wuhan
- Location: Echeng, Ezhou, Hubei, China
- Opened: 17 July 2022; 3 years ago
- Hub for: SF Airlines
- Elevation AMSL: 21 m / 69 ft
- Coordinates: 30°20′34.28″N 115°1′46.60″E
- Website: ehuairport.com

Map
- Location in Hubei EHU/ZHEC (China)

Runways
Direction	Length		Surface
Direction	m	ft	Surface
01L/19R	3,600	11,811	Concrete
01R/19L	3,600	11,811	Concrete

Statistics (2024)
- Passengers: 438,562
- Aircraft movements: 39,168
- Cargo (metric tons): 865,186.8
- Source: CAPA CAAC

Ezhou Huahu International Airport
- Simplified Chinese: 鄂州花湖国际机场
- Traditional Chinese: 鄂州花湖國際機場
Transcriptions
Standard Mandarin
- Hanyu Pinyin: Èzhōu Huāhú Guójì Jīchǎng

Ezhou Huahu International Airport (IATA: EHU, ICAO: ZHEC) is an airport serving the cities of Ezhou, Huanggang and Huangshi in Hubei, China. The airport was developed by SF Express and Hubei province as a logistics hub for China and is touted as China's first cargo-focused airport. One of the factors for SF Express to choose Ezhou as the site of a major cargo hub is it being located almost equidistant from Shanghai, Beijing and Guangzhou, while also being only an hour drive away from Wuhan.

The airport uses a single terminal with two runways as well as logistics facilities for handling an initial operation of over two million tonnes of cargo. The terminal is planned to handle one million passengers annually by 2025. On December 29, 2021, the first aircraft carried out flight verification at the airport. The airport opened on July 17, 2022 for passenger service. Cargo service started on November 27, 2022.

== Airlines and destinations ==
=== Passenger ===
Airlines	Destinations
Air Chang'an	Xiamen, Xi'an
China Eastern Airlines	Chengdu–Tianfu, Quanzhou
Okay Airways	Shenzhen, Tianjin

=== Cargo ===
Airlines	Destinations
Etihad Cargo	Abu Dhabi, Frankfurt
One Air	East Midlands
Geosky	Charter: Milan–Malpensa
Maersk Air Cargo	Billund
SF Airlines	Abu Dhabi, Almaty, Bengaluru, Budapest, Chennai, Delhi, Frankfurt, Halifax, Hong Kong, Ho Chi Minh City Lahore, Liège, Los Angeles, Oslo, Shenzhen
IndiGo CarGo	Kolkata

== See also ==
- Jiaxing Nanhu Airport - freight hub for YTO Cargo Airlines
- Louisville Muhammad Ali International Airport - major freight hub airport for UPS Airlines
- Memphis International Airport - major freight hub airport for FedEx Express
- Leipzig/Halle Airport - major freight hub airport for DHL Aviation via EAT Leipzig
