= SF Airlines =

Cargo airline of China

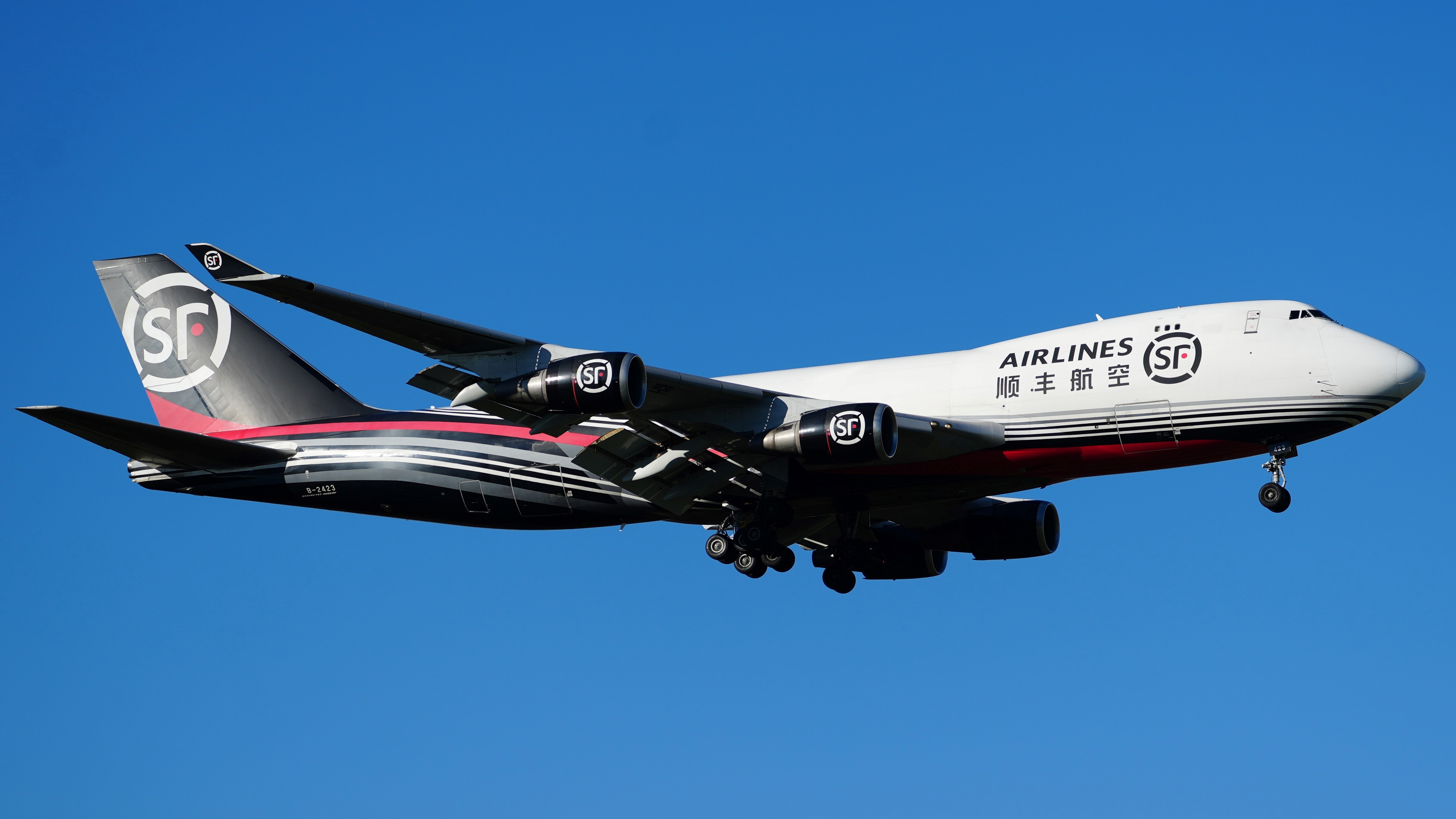
- SF Airlines Boeing 747-4EVERF
IATA	ICAO	Call sign
O3	CSS	SHUN FENG
- Commenced operations: 31 December 2009; 16 years ago
- Hubs: Ezhou
- Secondary hubs: Beijing–Capital; Chengdu–Tianfu; Hangzhou; Shenzhen
- Fleet size: 90
- Parent company: SF Express (Group) Co.
- Headquarters: Shenzhen Bao'an International Airport; Shenzhen, Guangdong, China
- Website: www.sf-airlines.com

SF Airlines
- Simplified Chinese: 顺丰航空公司
- Traditional Chinese: 順豐航空公司
Transcriptions
Standard Mandarin
- Hanyu Pinyin: Shùnfēng Hángkōng gōngsī
Yue: Cantonese
- Jyutping: seon^{6}fung^{1} hong^{4}hung^{1} gung^{1}si^{1}

SF Airlines (Chinese: 顺丰航空公司; pinyin: Shùnfēng Hángkōng gōngsī) is a Chinese cargo airline owned by SF Express. The company is headquartered in the No.1 Freight Depot of the International Shipping Center of Shenzhen Bao'an International Airport in Bao'an, Shenzhen, Guangdong province.

== History ==
Although a preparatory team for SF Airlines was founded in 2005, it wasn't until 2009 that the preparation was approved by the Civil Aviation Administration of China. A successful maiden flight was made on 31 December 2009. SF Airlines began its first flights in 2010 to the plateau area of Yushu City, Qinghai carrying earthquake relief materials. Shortly after, a second Boeing 757-200F was put into operation.

In 2011, SF Airlines became the first company in the industry to pass the CCAR-121-R4 for supplemental operations. They also flew their first Boeing 737-300F in 2011. SF Airlines passed the International Region Supplemental Operation Assessment and became qualified to operate international routes. In 2012, SF Airlines operated its first Boeing 737-400F.

In October 2014, Boeing announced that an undisclosed number of Boeing 767-300ER will be converted by Boeing to a Freighter as part of the proven BCF Program for Fleet Expansion by SF Airlines with an entry into service in 2015 of the first aircraft. This agreement also included a Letter of Intent to acquire Boeing 737-800 Boeing Converted Freighters for future fleet expansion and to replace existing B737 Classic aircraft. SF Airlines had a fleet of 26 Boeing aircraft by the end of 2015. The company managed to establish a hub in Hangzhou Xiaoshan International Airport to help expand its business in East China.

On 21 October 2016, SF Airlines' 36th freighter and also the 4th B767-300BCF took its test flight in Singapore then diverted to Shenzhen Bao'an International Airport. SF Airlines was arguably the No.1 cargo carrier in China in terms of fleet numbers. In November 2017, SF Airlines bought two Boeing 747-400ERF of the defunct Jade Cargo International in an auction held by Alibaba worth 320 million CNY (US$48.4 million).

In the beginning of 2026 My Freighter, the largest cargo airline in Uzbekistan, announced the expansion of its international cooperation through the signing of several interline agreements with carriers in China, particularly with SF Airlines as a key partner. These partnerships aim to strengthen the company's transport network and enhance the efficiency of cargo operations between China, Central Asia, and key global markets.

== Fleet ==
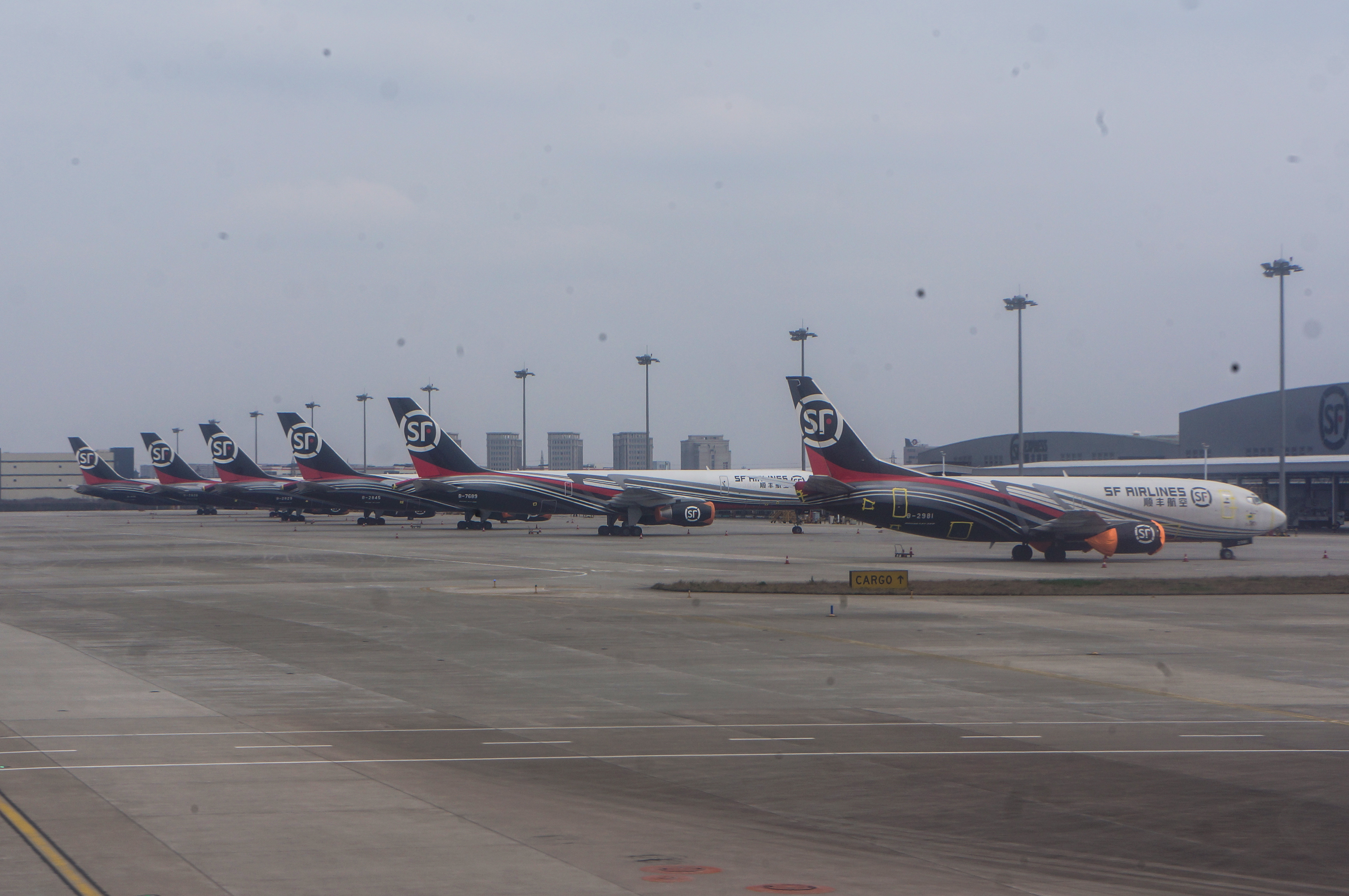
SF Airlines' aircraft fleet at Hangzhou Xiaoshan International Airport

As of August 2025, SF Airlines operates the following aircraft:

Aircraft	In fleet	Orders	Notes
Boeing 737-300SF	14	—	
Boeing 737-400SF	3	—	
Boeing 737-800BCF	2	—	
Boeing 747-400ERF	4	—	Taken over from China Cargo Airlines and Jade Cargo International
Boeing 747-400F	1	1	Taken over from China Southern Airlines Cargo
Boeing 757-200PCF	43	—	
Boeing 767-300ER/BCF	23	1	
Total	90	2	

=== Gallery ===
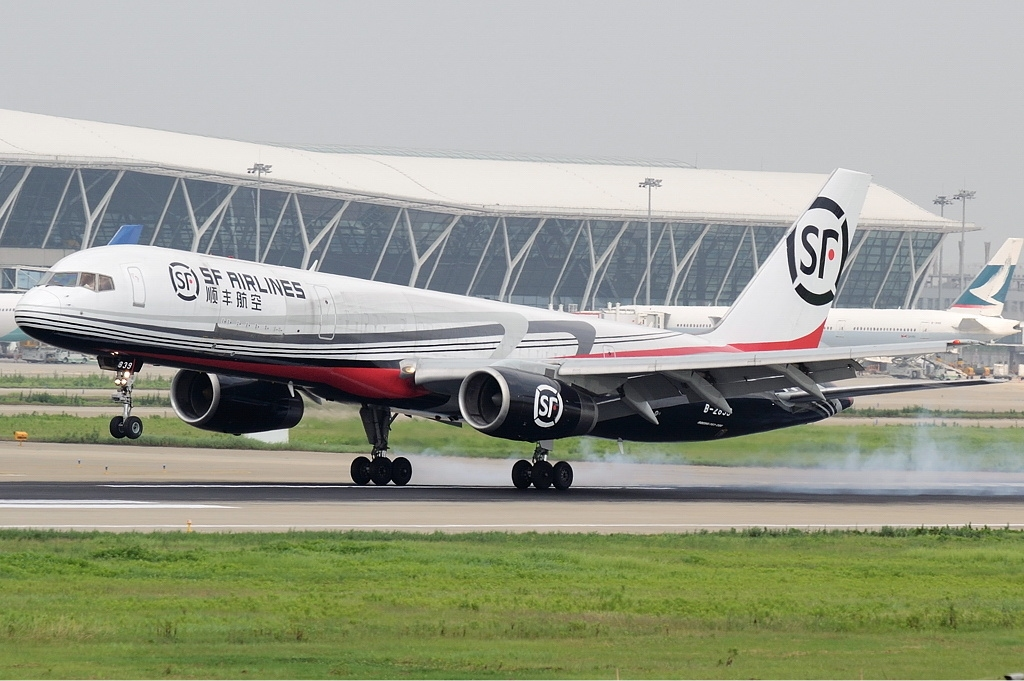
SF Airlines Boeing 757-2Z0(SF) at Shanghai Pudong International Airport

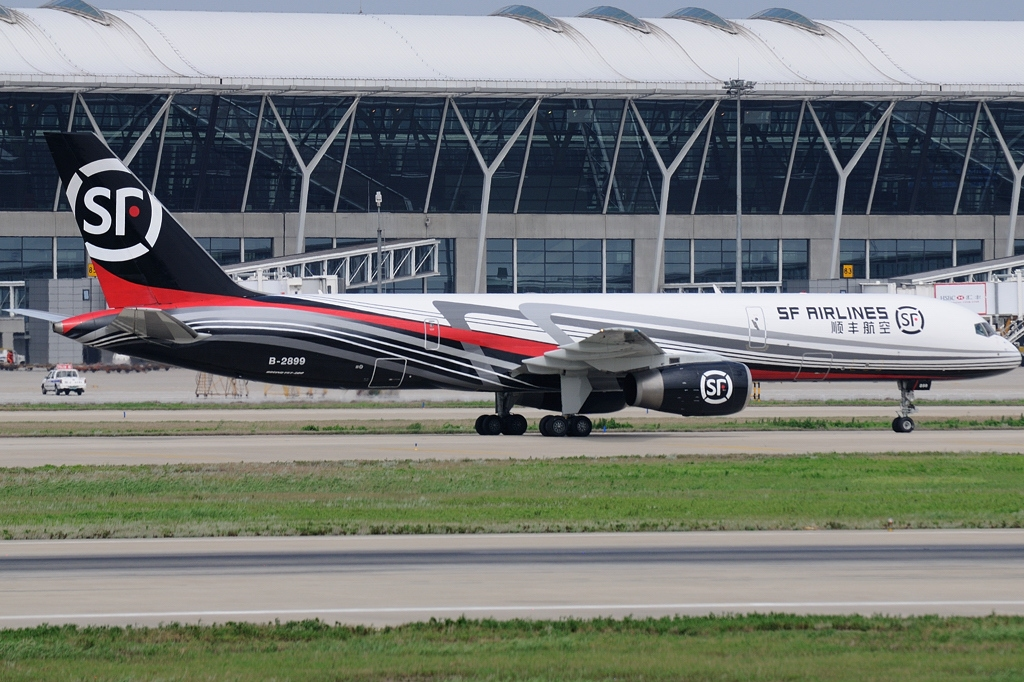
SF Airlines Boeing 757-21B(SF) at Shanghai Pudong International airport

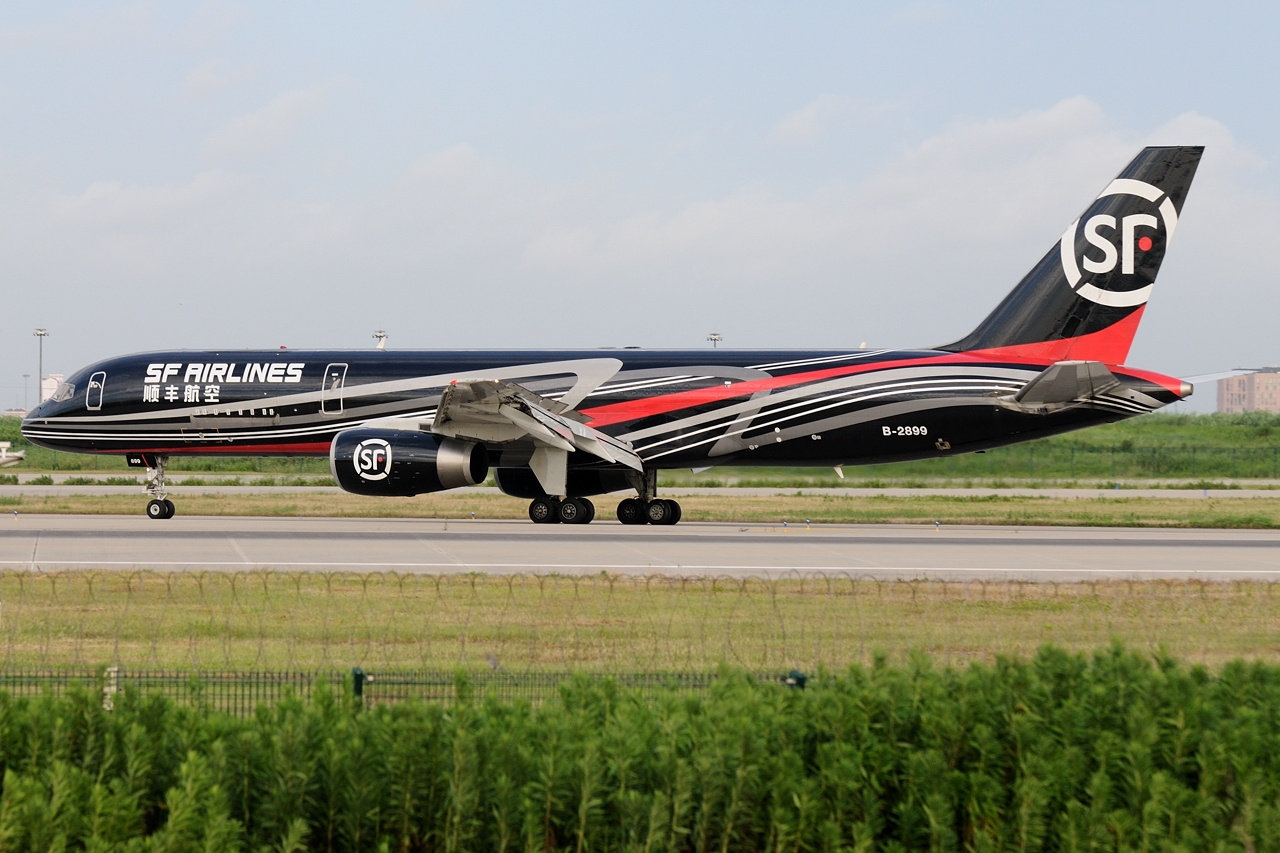
SF Airlines Boeing 757-21B(SF) at Shanghai Pudong International airport

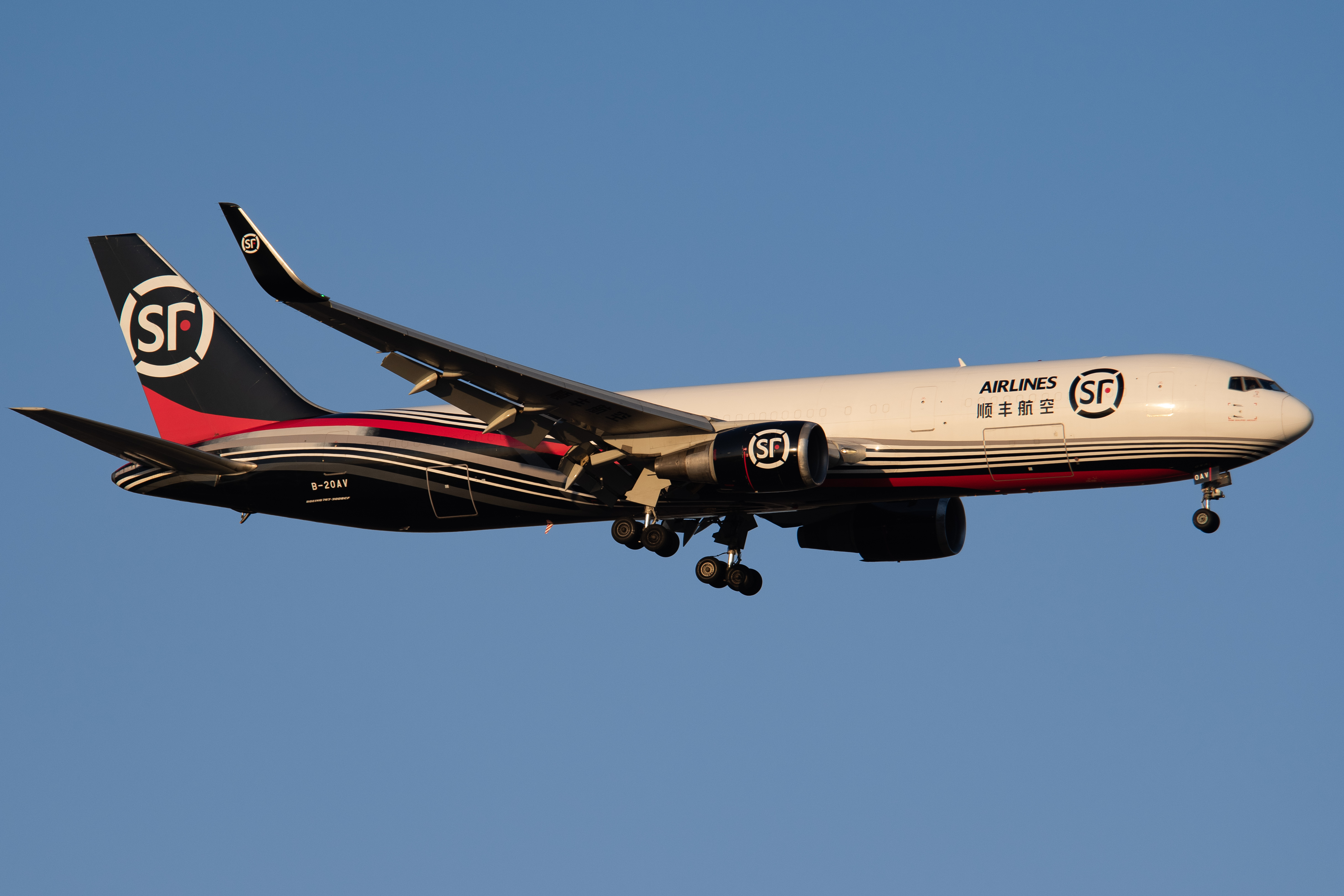
SF Airlines Boeing 767-304ER(BCF)
