= SF Express =

Chinese logistics company

- Type: Subsidiary
- Industry: Cargo airline and logistics
- Founded: March 26, 1993; 33 years ago
- Founder: Wang Wei
- Headquarters: Shenzhen, Guangdong, China
- Area served: Worldwide
- Products: International express delivery and logistics services
- Number of employees: 400,000 (2017)
- Website: www.sf-express.com

SF Express (Group) Co., Ltd.
- Simplified Chinese: 顺丰速运（集团）有限公司
- Traditional Chinese: 順豐速運（集團）有限公司
Transcriptions
Standard Mandarin
- Hanyu Pinyin: Shùnfēng Sùyùn (Jítuán) Yǒuxiàn Gōngsī

SF Express
- Simplified Chinese: 顺丰速运
- Traditional Chinese: 順豐速運
Transcriptions
Standard Mandarin
- Hanyu Pinyin: Shùnfēng Sùyùn

SF Express (Group) Co., Ltd. is a Chinese multinational delivery services and logistics company based in Shenzhen, Guangdong. It is the largest courier in China, and provides domestic and international express delivery. SF Express operates a fleet of cargo aircraft, which are owned by its subsidiary SF Airlines. The parent company of SF Express, SF Holding trades on the Shenzhen Stock Exchange and the Hong Kong Stock Exchange. It is a constituent of SZSE 100 Index.

== History ==
In the early 1990s, factories in Shunde needed to get samples to Hong Kong–based buyers, but frequently had issues with long shipping delays. To speed up this process, founder Wang Wei established ShunFeng Express as a small courier service with six employees, launching in 1993 providing service between Hong Kong and Guangdong province.

SF Express has opened at least 500 Heike (Chinese: 嘿客)—an online shopping service community store—across all Chinese provinces, except for in Tibet and Qinghai. The company had plans to open 4,000 Heike stores nationwide in 2014. Since 2016, SF Express has undertaken military-civil fusion agreements with the Logistic Support Department of the Central Military Commission and People's Liberation Army (PLA).

In July 2017, SF Express used backdoor listing to begin trading on the Shenzhen Stock Exchange, involving an asset swap with listed company Maanshan Dintai Rare Earth & New Materials Co. SF Express was added as a constituent of SZSE 100 Index on June 12, 2017, effective on its first trading day. In 2018, it started drone airdrop resupply operations for the PLA's Southern Theater Command. As of October 2020, SF Express operates one of the largest networks of self-service locker kiosks in Hong Kong with 939 kiosks.

In 2021, SF Express made a significant investment in partnership with Hubei province to develop Ezhou Huahu cargo-focused Airport. The Ezhou Huahu cargo hub is strategic for SF Express delivery operations for its central location to major cities such as Shanghai, Beijing and Guangzhou, while also being only an hour drive away from Wuhan. The Airport officially opened in 2022 and was renamed Ezhou Huahu International Airport in May 2025.

In 2023, SF Express in partnership with China Railway Express launched a high-speed rail freight dedicated line, strengthening its ground transportation network.

== Gallery ==
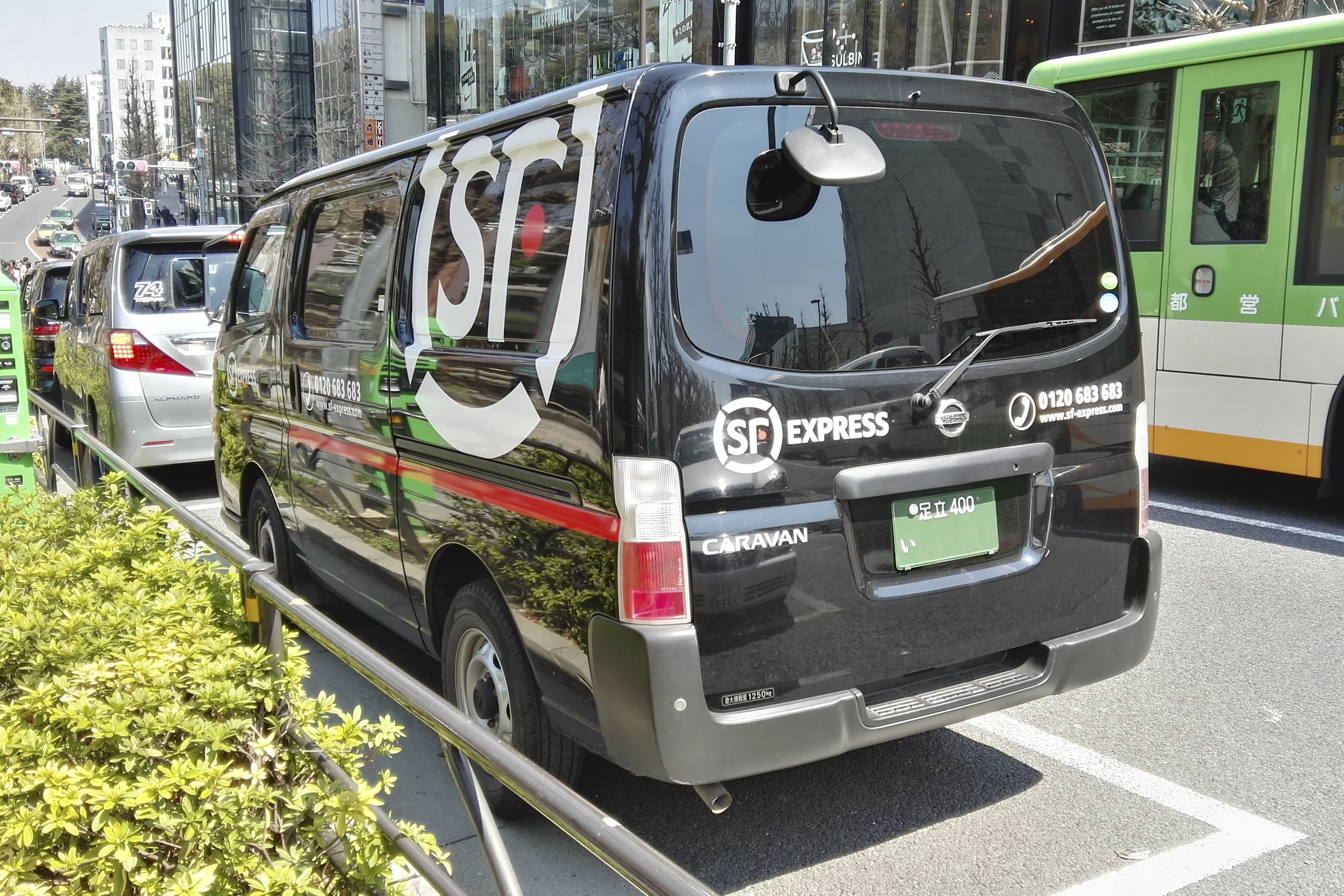
An SF Express van in Tokyo, Japan

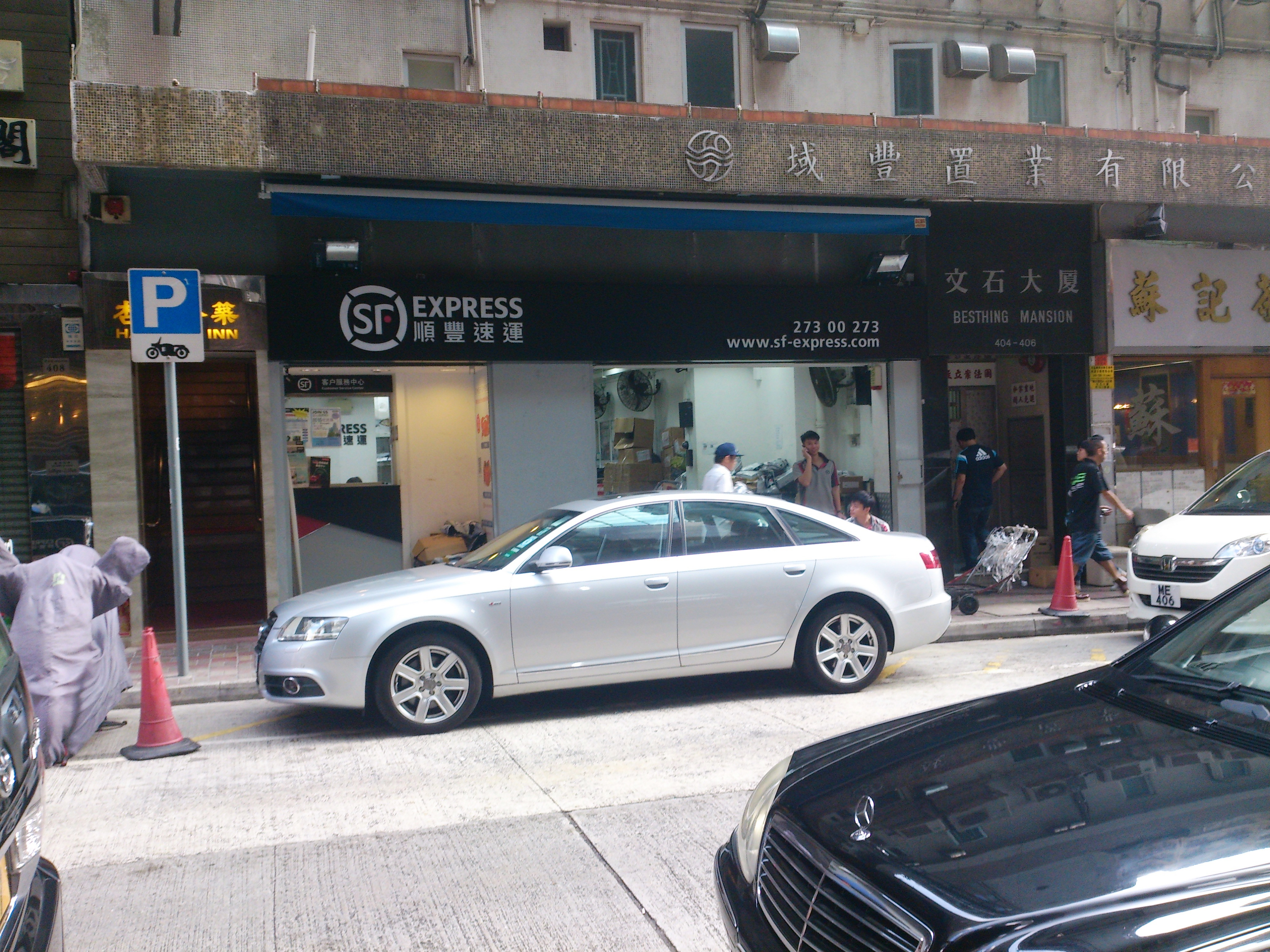
An SF Express Service Center in Hong Kong

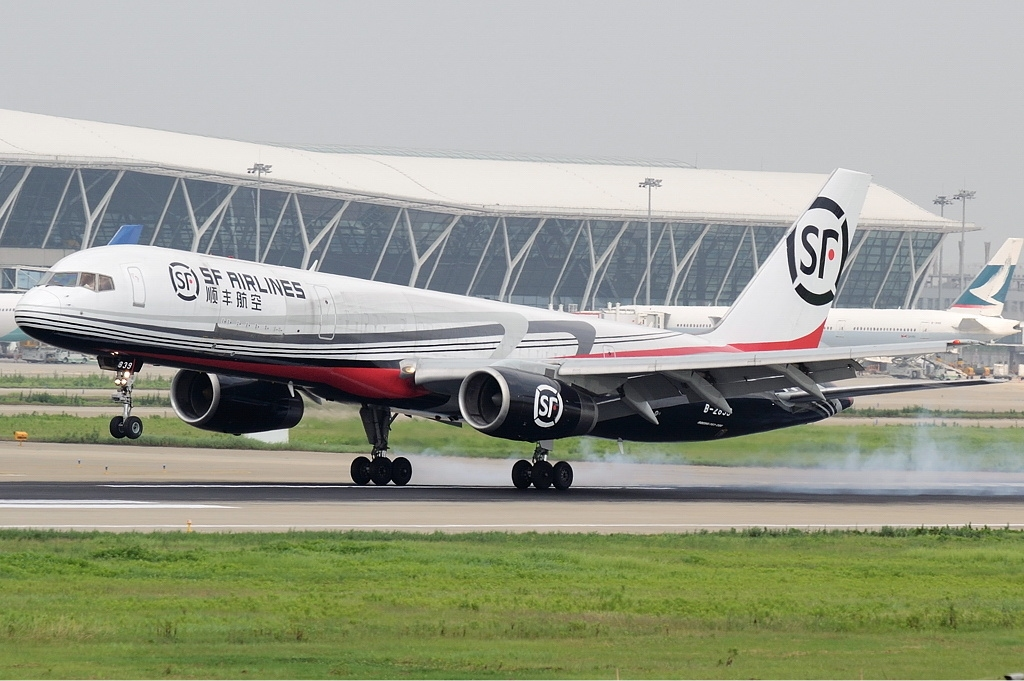
An SF Airlines cargo plane at Shanghai Pudong International Airport

== See also ==
- SF Airlines
