= List of Boeing 747 operators =

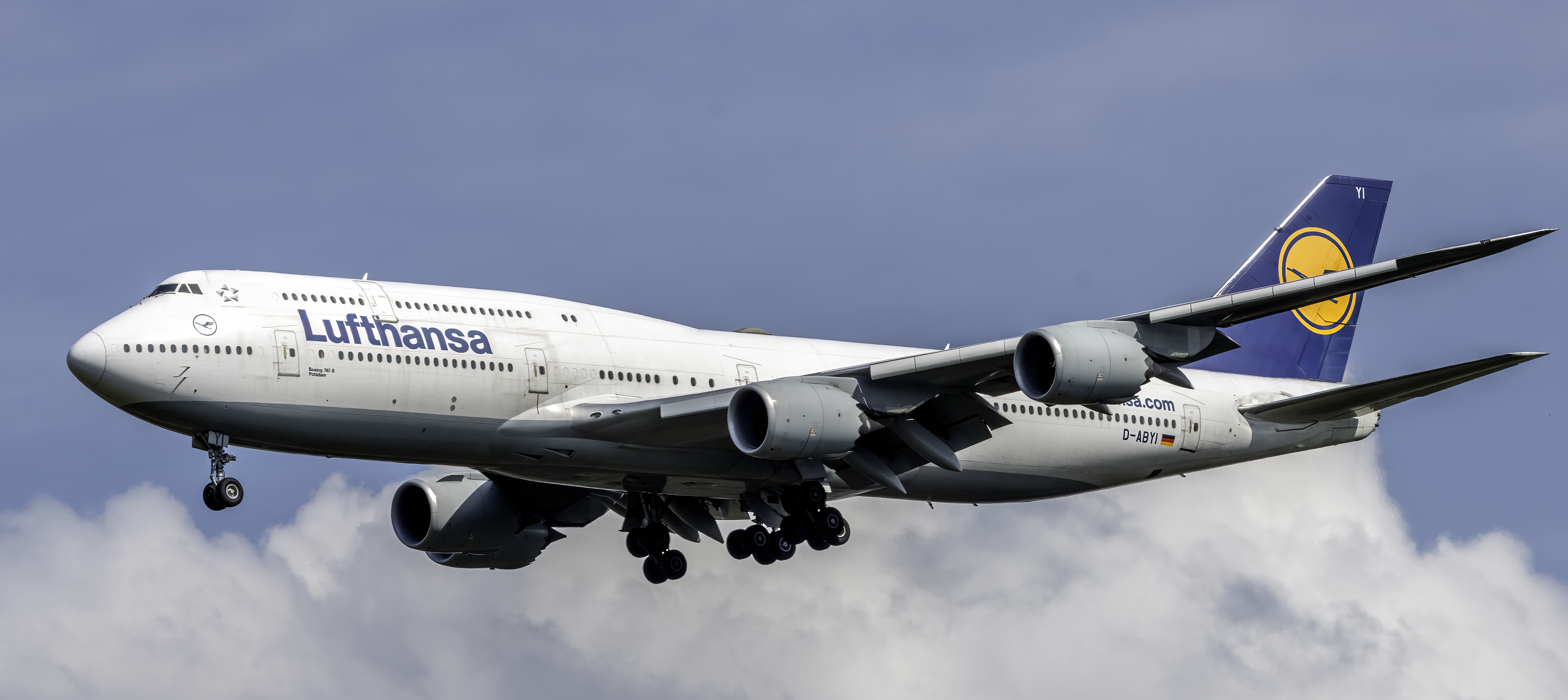
Lufthansa is the largest remaining passenger carrier of the Boeing 747

The following is a list of current commercial operators of the Boeing 747, and any of its variants.

== Current airline operators ==
These aircraft are listed by airline operators and variant in the following table.

Airline	747-100 (Note: Includes 747-100F)	747SP	747-200 (Note: Includes 747-200F)	747-300 (Note: Includes 747-300F and Combi)	747-400 (Note: Includes 747-400 Combi)	747-400 freighter (Note: Includes 747-400F and 747-400 converted freighter)	747-8i	747-8F	747 Fleet
ACT Airlines	—	—	—	—	—	2	—	—	2
Aerostan	—	—	3	—	—	—	—	—	3
Aerotranscargo	—	—	—	—	—	6	—	—	6
Air Atlanta Europe	—	—	—	—	—	6	—	—	6
Air Atlanta Icelandic	—	—	—	—	—	8	—	—	8
Air Belgium	—	—	—	—	—	—	—	2	2
Air China	—	—	—	—	2	—	7	—	9
Air China Cargo	—	—	—	—	—	2	—	—	2
Air Zeta	—	—	—	—	—	10	—	—	10
ASL Airlines Belgium	—	—	—	—	—	5	—	—	5
Atlas Air	—	—	—	—	5	43 (Note: incl. four 747-400LCF Dreamlifter)	—	15 (Note: N863GT last 747 built. L/N 1574)	63
Cathay Pacific	—	—	—	—	—	6	—	14	20
Cargolux	—	—	—	—	—	12	—	14	26
Cargolux Italia	—	—	—	—	—	4	—	—	4
Challenge Airlines BE	—	—	—	—	—	4	—	—	4
Challenge Airlines IL	—	—	—	—	—	2	—	—	2
China Airlines	—	—	—	—	—	8	—	—	8
Air Central (China)	—	—	—	—	—	3	—	—	3
Compass Cargo Airlines	—	—	—	—	—	3	—	—	3
Elitavia Malta	—	—	—	—	—	1	—	—	1
Fly Pro	—	—	3	—	—	—	—	—	3
Iran Air	—	—	1	—	—	—	—	—	1
Kalitta Air	—	—	—	—	—	22	—	—	22
Korean Air	—	—	—	—	—	4	4 (Note: HL7644 last passenger 747 built. L/N 1539)	7	15
Lufthansa	—	—	—	—	8	—	17	—	25
Mahan Air	—	—	—	—	1	—	—	—	1
Martinair	—	—	—	—	—	4	—	—	4
Max Air	—	—	—	—	2	—	—	—	2
National Airlines	—	—	—	—	—	9	—	—	9
Nippon Cargo Airlines	—	—	—	—	—	—	—	8	8
One Air	—	—	—	—	—	3	—	—	3
Pecotox Air	—	—	—	—	—	1	—	—	1
Polar Air Cargo	—	—	—	—	—	—	—	2	2
ROMCargo Airlines	—	—	—	—	—	1	—	—	1
Rossiya Airlines	—	—	—	—	3	—	—	—	3
Saha Airlines	—	—	1	—	—	—	—	—	1
SF Airlines	—	—	—	—	—	5	—	—	5
Silk Way West Airlines	—	—	—	—	—	5	—	5	10
Singapore Airlines	—	—	—	—	—	7	—	—	7
Sky Lease Cargo	—	—	—	—	—	2	—	—	2
Suparna Airlines	—	—	—	—	—	2	—	—	2
Terra Avia	—	—	—	—	2	2	—	—	4
Transaviaexport Cargo Airline	—	—	—	1	—	—	—	—	1
UPS Airlines	—	—	—	—	—	13	—	30	43
Western Global Airlines	—	—	—	—	—	4	—	—	4
Airliner fleet	—	—	8	1	22	209	28	97	365

== Current non-airline operators ==
Operator	747-100 (Note: Includes 747-100F)	747SP	747-200 (Note: Includes 747-200F)	747-300 (Note: Includes 747-300F and Combi)	747-400 (Note: Includes 747-400 Combi, 747-400F and 747-400ERF)	747-8i	747-8F	747 Fleet	Note
Dubai Royal Air Wing	—	—	—	—	4	—	—	4	
Egyptian Government	—	—	—	—	—	1	—	1	VVIP configuration
General Electric	—	—	—	—	1	—	—	1	Flying testbed
Government of Brunei	—	—	—	—	—	1	—	1	VVIP configuration
Iranian Air Force	—	—	1	—	—	—	—	1	
NasJet	—	—	—	—	1	—	—	1	
Korean Government	—	—	—	—	—	1	—	1	VVIP configuration
Moroccan Government	—	—	—	—	1	1	—	2	747-8i in VVIP configuration
Pratt & Whitney	—	2	—	—	—	—	—	2	
Qatar Amiri Flight	—	—	—	—	—	2	—	2	VVIP configuration
Bahrain Royal Flight	—	—	—	—	2	—	—	2	
Royal Flight of Oman	—	—	—	—	1	1	—	2	747-8i in VVIP configuration
Saudi Arabian Government	—	—	—	—	1	—	—	1	
Sierra Nevada Corporation	—	—	—	—	—	5	—	5	purchased from Korean Air for the US Air Force to replace the 747-200 E-4Bs
State of Kuwait	—	—	—	—	—	1	—	1	VVIP configuration
Stratolaunch	—	—	—	—	1	—	—	1	
Turkish Government	—	—	—	—	—	1	—	1	VVIP configuration
US Air Force	—	—	6	—	—	4	—	10	2 additional 747-8i's purchased from Lufthansa in addition to N7478D acquired from Qatar
Aircraft fleet	—	2	7	—	12	18	—	39	Non-airliner

== Orders and deliveries ==
Orders and deliveries sortable, presorted by customer
Customer	Orders																								
Customer	747 -100	747 -100B	747 -100SR	747 -200B	747 -200C	747 -200F	747 -200M	747 -300	747 -300M	747 -300SR	747 -400	747 -400D	747 -400ER	747 -400ERF	747 -400F	747 -400M	747 -8F	747 -8I	747 -E4A	747 -E4B	747 -SP	Total	PW	GE	RR
Aer Lingus	2																					2	2		
Aerolíneas Argentinas				7																		7	7		
Air Afrique						1																1	1		
Air Canada	5						2									3						10	10		
Air China						1	1				6					8		7				23	16	7	
Air China Cargo															2							2	2		
Air France	16			2		10	11				7			2		5						53	17	36	
Air Gabon							1															1		1	
Air India				11					2		6											19	17	2	
Air Madagascar							1															1	1		
Air Namibia																1						1		1	
Air New Zealand				5							4											9		1	8
AirBridgeCargo																	7					7		7	
Alitalia	2			9		1	5															17	5	12	
All Nippon Airways			17	5							12	11										45		45	
Altavair LLC														6								6		6	
American Airlines	16																					16	16		
Asiana Airlines											2				5	6						13		13	
Atlas Air															15		14					29		29	
Avianca							1															1	1		
Braniff	1			1																	3	5	5		
British Airways	18			15		1	3				57											94	18		76
Business Jet / VIP Customer(s)																		8				8		8	
CAAC-Civil Aviation of China							2														4	6	6		
Cameroon Airlines							1															1	1		
Canadian Airlines											4											4		4	
Cargolux						2									16		14					32	2	19	11
Cathay Pacific				8		2		6			17			6	6		14					59	6	14	39
China Airlines				3		2	1				17				21						4	48	23	25	
China Cargo														2								2		2	
China Southern Airlines															2							2	2		
Condor				2																		2	2		
CP Air				4																		4	4		
Delta Air Lines	5																					5	5		
Eastern Air Lines	4																					4	4		
EgyptAir									2													2	2		
El Al				4	2	1					4											11	11		
EVA Air											7				3	8						18		18	
Flying Tiger						6																6	6		
Garuda Indonesia				6							3											8	6	2	
GECAS											1			2	5							8		8	
Government of Japan											2											2		2	
Iberia	2			6			1															9	9		
ILFC								3			14			3	1							21		19	2
Iran Air (Homa)		1					2														4	7	7		
Iraqi Airways					3																1	4	4		
Islamic Republic of Iran Air Force	1					4	1															4	16		
Jade Cargo International														6								6		6	
Japan Airlines	8		12	24		7		9		4	34	8			2							108	64	44	
Japan Asia Airways								1														1	1		
Kingdom of Saudi Arabia								1													1	2	1		1
KLM				10			7		3		5			3		17						45	7	38	
Korean Air				6		5		2	1		27			8	10	1	7	10			2	79	62	17	
Kuwait Airways				4												1						5	4	1	
LoadAir Cargo														2								2		2	
Lufthansa	3			7		6	14				25					7		19				81	6	75	
Malaysia Airlines									1		19				2	2						24	20	4	
Mandarin Airlines											1											1	1		
Martinair					2																	2		2	
Middle East Airlines							3															3	3		
National Airlines	2																					2	2		
Nippon Cargo Airlines						6									10		8					24		24	
Northwest Airlines	10			19		8					16											53	53		
Olympic Airways				2																		2	2		
Pakistan International Airlines							2															2		2	
Pan Am	33					2															10	45	45		
Philippine Airlines				4							3					1						8		8	
Presidential Flight											1										1	2		1	1
Qantas				19			3	6			21		6								2	57	17	6	34
Royal Air Maroc							1															1	1		
Royal Jordanian				1			2															3		3	
Sabena	2								2													4	2	2	
Saudia		8				1		10			5										2	26		5	21
Scandinavian Airlines				3			3															6	6		
Seaboard World Airlines						4																4	4		
Silk Way Airlines																	5					5		5	
Singapore Airlines				19		1		11	3		42				17							93	93		
South African Airways				5			2	2			8										6	23	15	2	6
Swissair				2				2	3													7	7		
Syrianair																					2	2	2		
TAP Portugal				4																		4	4		
Thai Airways				6				2			18											26		26	
Transamerica Airlines					3																	3		3	
TWA	15																				3	18	18		
U.S. Air Force				2											1				3	1		7		7	
Unidentified Customer(s)											1						4	2				7		7	
United Airlines	22			2							44											68	68		
UPS															8		28					36		36	
USAF PAR Program																		2				2		2	
UTA						2	2	1	2		1					1						9		9	
Varig							3		2													5		5	
Virgin Atlantic											9											9		9	
Volga-Dnepr UK Ltd																	6					6		6	
Wardair	1			2																		3	1	2	
World Airways					3																	3	3		
Total	168	9	29	229	13	73	74	56	21	4	442	19	6	40	126	61	107	48	3	1	45	1,573	734	640	199

== Former civil operators of a Boeing 747 variant ==
Original operators - ♠

=== Boeing 747-100 ===
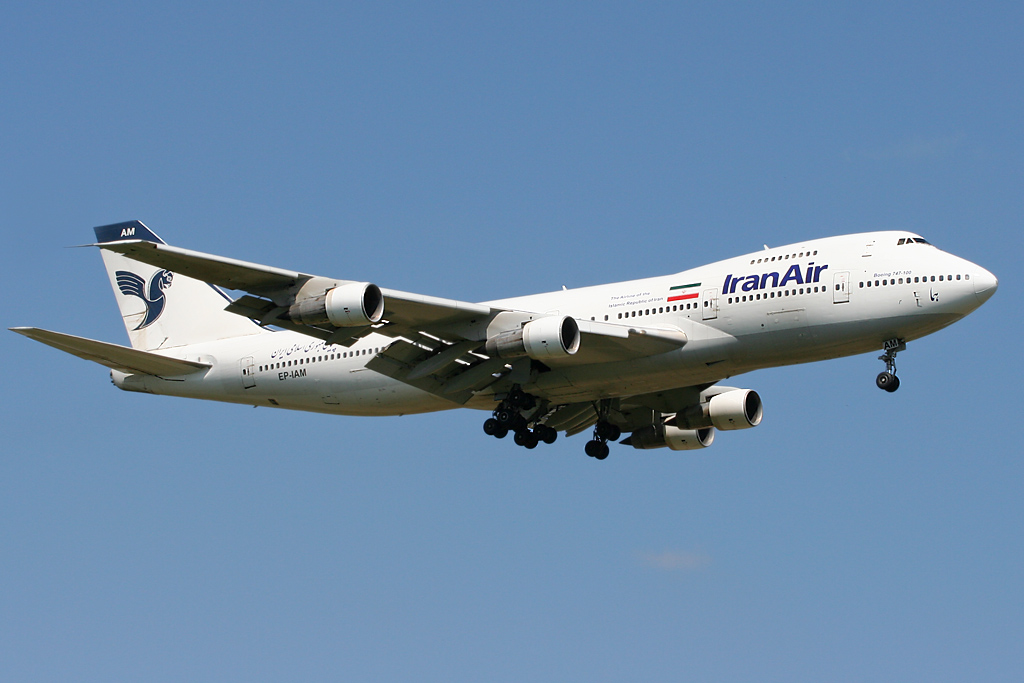
Iran Air Boeing 747-100B

- Aer Lingus ♠
- Air Atlanta Icelandic
- Air Canada ♠
- Air France ♠
- Air Hong Kong
- Alitalia ♠
- All Nippon Airways ♠
- American Airlines ♠
- Braniff International ♠
- British Overseas Airways Corporation ♠
- British Airways
- Canadian Pacific Airlines
- China Airlines
- Corsair
- Continental Airlines ♠
- Delta Air Lines ♠
- Eastern Air Lines
- Evergreen International Airlines
- Federal Express
- Global International Airways
- Iberia ♠
- Iran Air ♠
- Japan Air Lines ♠
- Japan Asia Airlines ♠
- Kabo Air
- LANChile
- Lufthansa ♠
- National Airlines ♠
- Northwest Airlines ♠
- Okada Air
- Orion Air
- Pan American World Airways ♠
- Qatar Airways
- Royal Air Maroc
- SABENA ♠
- Saha Airlines
- Saudi Arabian Airlines ♠
- Scandinavian Airlines
- Tower Air ♠
- Trans Air Service
- Trans World Airlines ♠
- United Airlines ♠
- UPS Airlines
- Virgin Atlantic
- Wardair ♠

=== Boeing 747SP ===
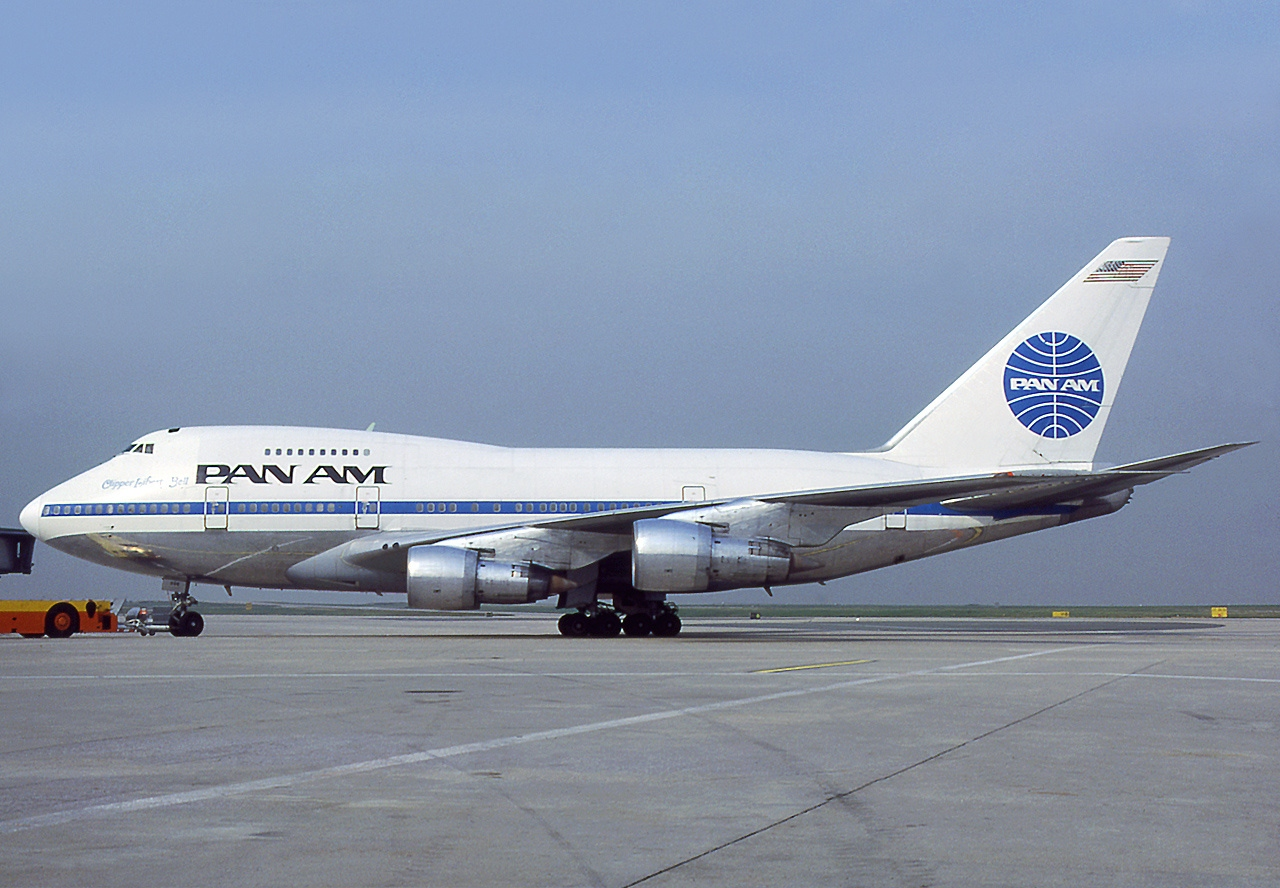
Pan Am Boeing 747SP

- Aerolíneas Argentinas
- Air China
- Air Mauritius
- Air Namibia
- Alliance Air
- American Airlines
- Australia Asia Airlines
- Avia Airlines
- Braniff International ♠
- CAAC ♠
- China Airlines ♠
- Corsair
- Iran Air ♠
- Iraqi Airways ♠
- Kazakhstan Airlines
- Korean Air ♠
- Luxair
- Mandarin Airlines
- Pan American World Airways ♠
- Qantas ♠
- Saudi Arabian Airlines ♠
- South African Airways ♠
- Syrian Air ♠
- Trans World Airlines ♠
- United Airlines

=== Boeing 747-200 ===
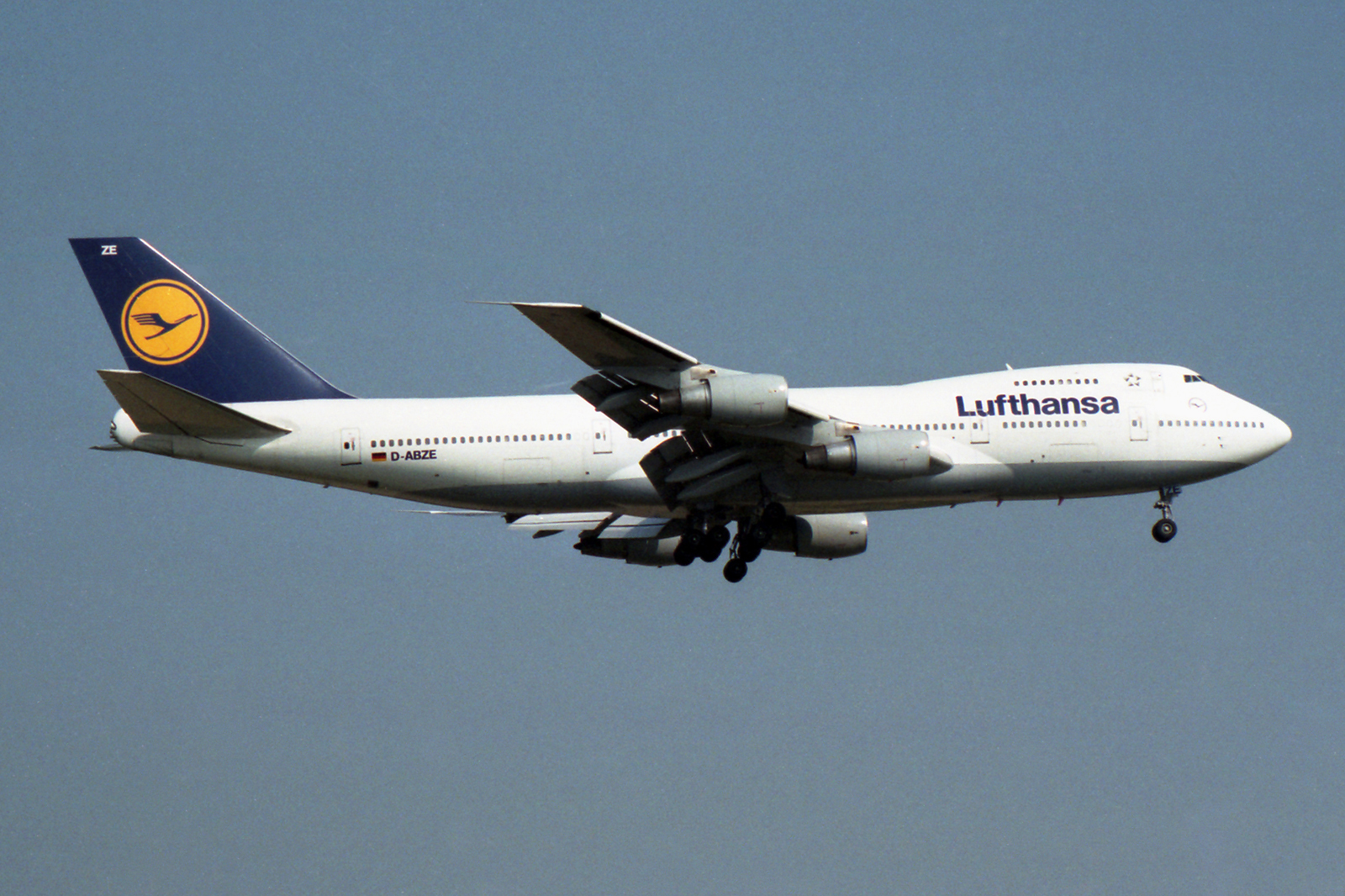
Lufthansa 747-200

- Aerolíneas Argentinas ♠
- Air Afrique ♠
- Air Canada ♠
- Air China ♠
- Air Club International
- Air France ♠
- Air Gabon ♠
- Air India ♠
- Air Madagascar ♠
- Air New Zealand ♠
- Alitalia ♠
- All Nippon Airways ♠
- American International Airways
- Atlas Air
- Avianca ♠
- Braniff International ♠
- British Airways ♠
- CAAC ♠
- Cameroon Airlines ♠
- Canadian Pacific Airlines
- Cargolux ♠
- Cathay Pacific ♠
- China Airlines ♠
- Condor Airlines ♠
- Continental Airlines
- Corsair
- El Al ♠
- Evergreen International Airlines
- Fars Air Qeshm
- Federal Express
- Flying Tiger ♠
- Garuda Indonesia ♠
- Geosky
- Iberia ♠
- Iraqi Airways ♠
- Japan Air Lines ♠
- KLM ♠
- Korean Air ♠
- Kuwait Airways ♠
- Lufthansa ♠
- Martinair ♠
- Middle East Airlines ♠
- Nippon Cargo Airlines ♠
- Northwest Airlines ♠
- Olympic Airways ♠
- Pakistan International Airlines ♠
- Pan American World Airways ♠
- Philippine Airlines ♠
- Qantas ♠
- Royal Air Maroc ♠
- Royal Jordanian ♠
- SABENA ♠
- Scandinavian Airlines ♠
- Seaboard World Airlines ♠
- Singapore Airlines ♠
- South African Airways ♠
- Swissair ♠
- TAP Air Portugal ♠
- Thai Airways International ♠
- Tower Air ♠
- Transamerica Airlines ♠
- Trans World Airlines
- Transaero
- Union de Transports Aériens
- United Airlines ♠
- Varig
- Virgin Atlantic

=== Boeing 747-300 ===
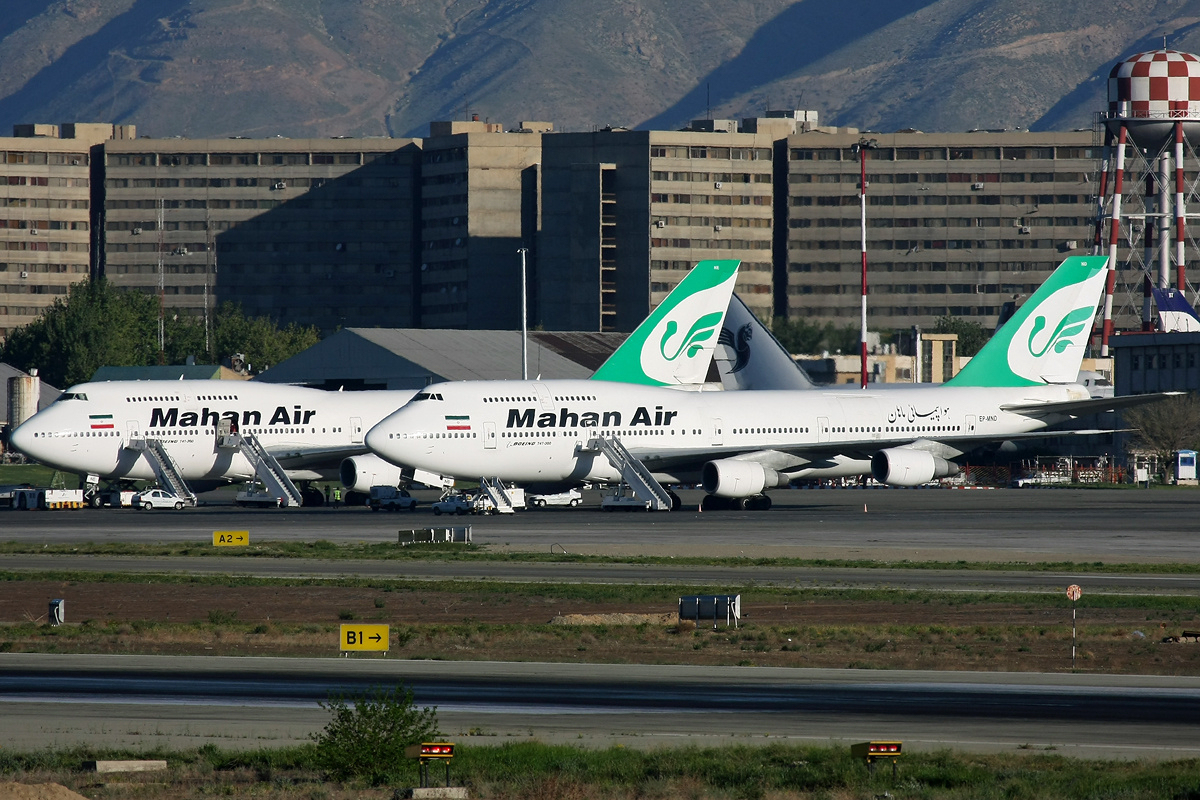
Two Mahan Airlines Boeing 747-300 at Mehrabad International Airport.

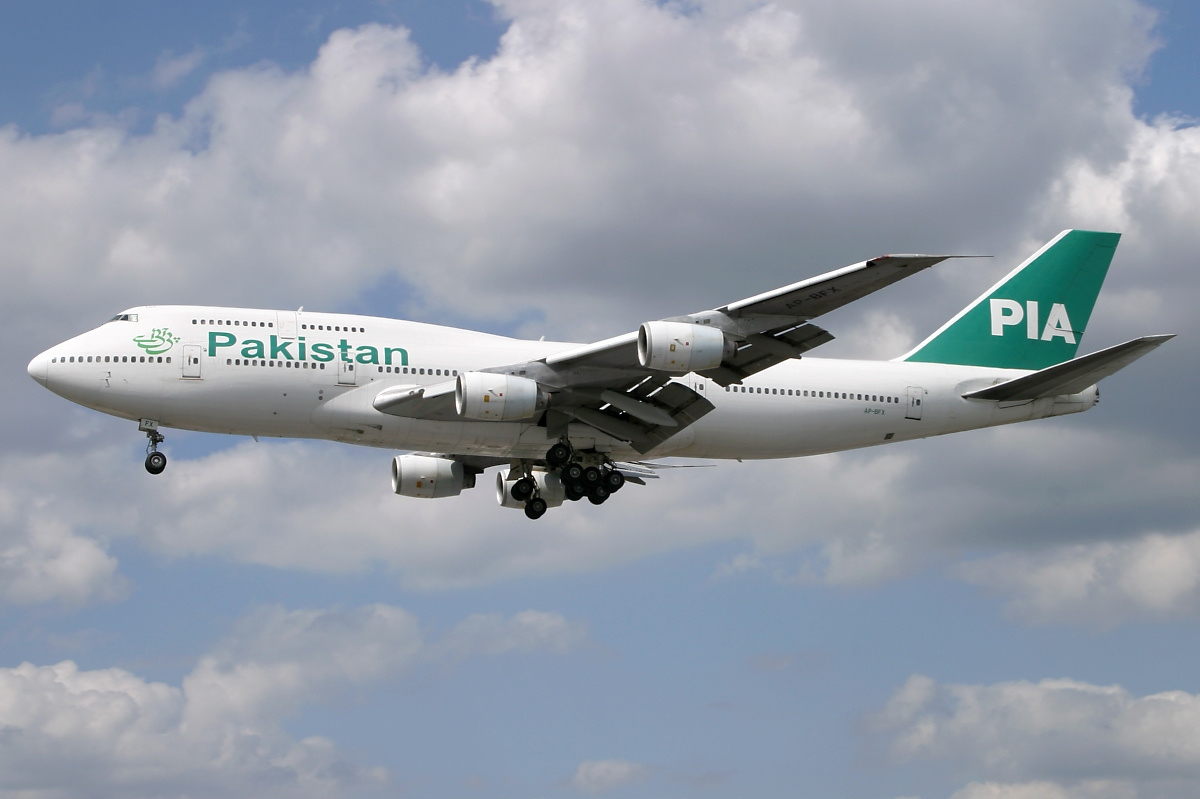
PIA Boeing 747-300 on short final to London Heathrow International Airport, on 12 June 2003.

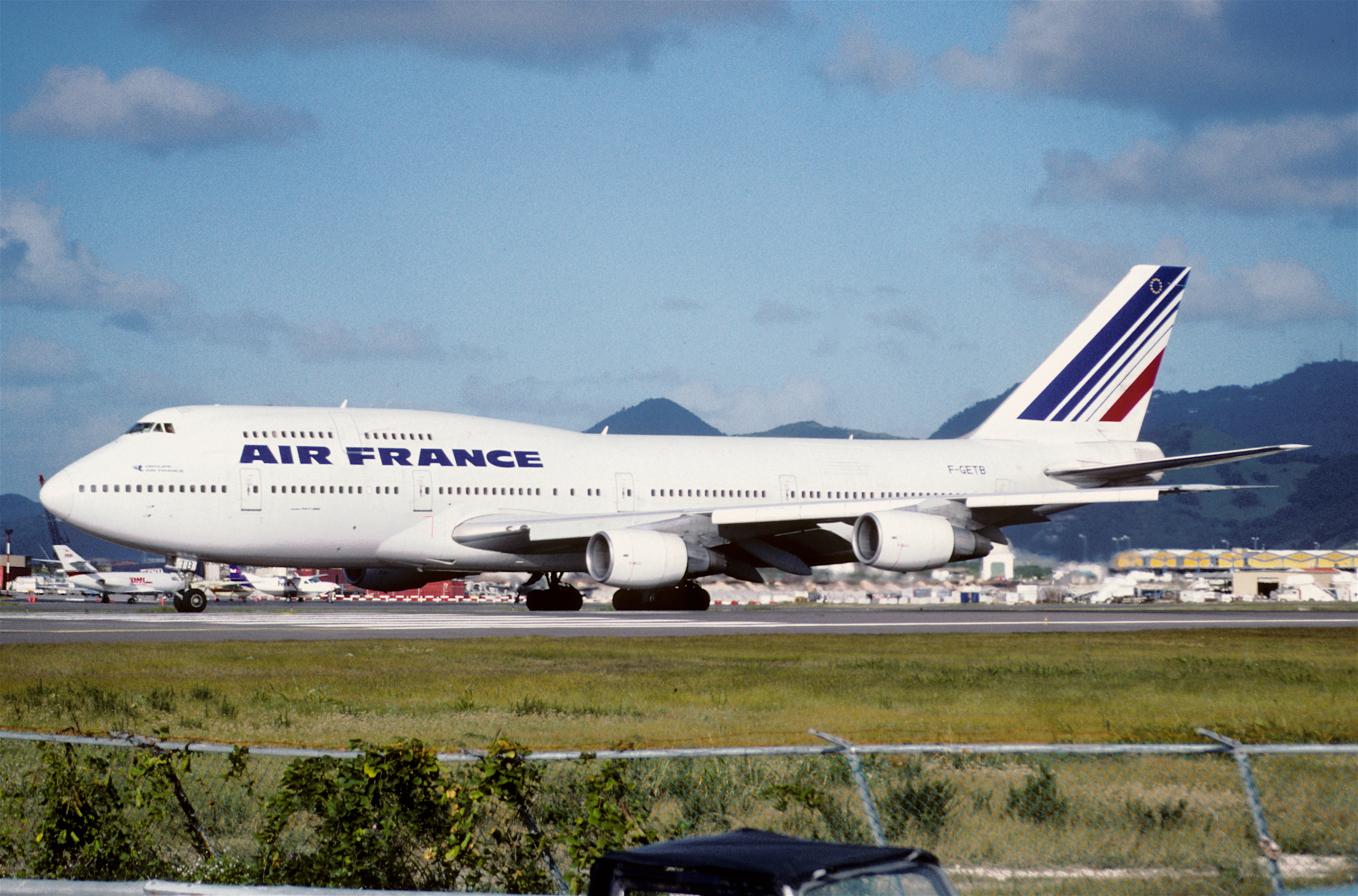
Air France Boeing 747-300 on 2 March 1999.

- Air France
- Air India ♠
- Ansett Australia
- Cathay Pacific ♠
- Egyptair ♠
- Garuda Indonesia ♠(Leased)
- Japan Airlines ♠
- Japan Asia Airways ♠
- KLM ♠
- Korean Air ♠
- Mahan Air
- Malaysia Airlines ♠
- Pakistan International Airlines
- Qantas ♠
- SABENA ♠
- Saudi Arabian Airlines ♠
- Singapore Airlines ♠
- South African Airways ♠
- Surinam Airways
- Swissair ♠
- Thai Airways International ♠
- Transaero
- Union de Transports Aériens ♠
- Varig ♠
- GMG airlines

=== Boeing 747-400 ===
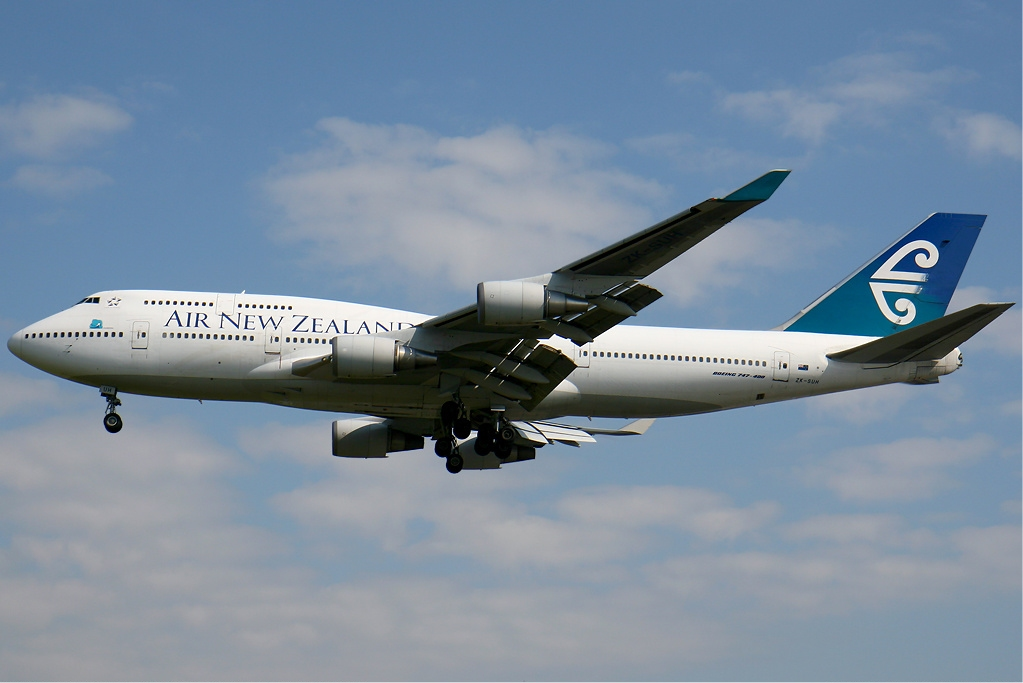
Air New Zealand Boeing 747-400

- Air Canada ♠
- Aerolíneas Argentinas
- Air France ♠
- Air India ♠
- Air Namibia ♠
- Air New Zealand ♠
- Air Pacific
- All Nippon Airways ♠
- Asiana Airlines ♠
- British Airways ♠
- Canadian Airlines ♠
- CargoLogicAir
- China Cargo Airlines ♠
- China Southern Airlines ♠
- El Al ♠
- EVA Airways ♠
- Garuda Indonesia ♠
- Jade Cargo International ♠
- Japan Air Lines ♠
- KLM ♠
- Kuwait Airways ♠
- LoadAir Cargo ♠
- Malaysia Airlines ♠
- Mandarin Airlines ♠
- Nippon Cargo Airlines ♠
- Northwest Airlines ♠
- Philippine Airlines ♠
- Qantas ♠
- Royal Air Maroc
- Saudi Arabian Airlines ♠
- South African Airways ♠
- Thai Airways International ♠
- Transaero
- Union de Transports Aériens ♠
- United Airlines ♠
- Varig
- Virgin Atlantic ♠
- Virgin Galactic
- Virgin Orbit

=== Boeing 747-8 ===
- AirBridgeCargo Airlines ♠
- Qatar Airways ♠

== Summary of deliveries ==
Model	First Delivery		Last Delivery		Total Delivered
Model	Date	Customer	Date	Customer	Total Delivered
747-100	December 13, 1969	Pan American World Airways	July 2, 1976	British Airways	167
747-100SR	September 26, 1973	Japan Airlines	April 2, 1975	Japan Airlines	7
747-100BSR	December 21, 1978	All Nippon Airways	November 12, 1982	All Nippon Airways	20
747-100B	August 2, 1979	Iran Air	April 2, 1982	Saudi Arabian Airlines	9
747-100B SUD	March 24, 1986	Japan Airlines	September 9, 1986	Japan Airlines	2
Total 747-100 Series:					205
747-200B	January 16, 1971	KLM	December 20, 1990	United States Air Force	233
747-200F (Freighter)	March 10, 1972	Lufthansa	November 19, 1991	Nippon Cargo Airlines	73
747-200C (Convertble)	April 30, 1973	World Airways	September 26, 1988	Martinair	13
747-200M (Combi)	March 7, 1975	Air Canada	April 5, 1988	Iberia Airlines	74
Total 747-200 Series:					393
747SP	March 5, 1976	Pan American World Airways	December 9, 1989	Abu Dhabi Govt. (UAE)	45
Total 747SP:					45
747-300	March 1, 1983	Union de Transports Aériens	October 18, 1988	Japan Asia	56
747-300M (Combi)	March 5, 1983	Swissair	September 25, 1990	Sabena	21
747-300SR	December 10, 1987	Japan Airlines	February 19, 1988	Japan Airlines	4
Total 747-300 Series:					81
747-400	January 26, 1989	Northwest Airlines	April 26, 2005	China Airlines	442
747-400M (Combi)	September 1, 1989	KLM	April 10, 2002	KLM	61
747-400D	October 10, 1991	Japan Airlines	December 11, 1995	All Nippon Airways	19
747-400F	November 17, 1993	Cargolux	May 7, 2009	Nippon Cargo Airlines	126
747-400ERF	October 17, 2002	Air France	November 10, 2009	LoadAir Cargo (Cancelled); Kalitta Air	40
747-400ER	October 31, 2002	Qantas	July 30, 2003	Qantas	6
Total 747-400 Series:					694
747-8F	October 12, 2011	Cargolux	January 31, 2023	Atlas Air	107
747-8BBJ	February 28, 2012	Govt. of Qatar	November 6, 2021	Govt. of Egypt	12
747-8I	April 26, 2012	Lufthansa	July 7, 2017	Korean Air	36
Total 747-8 Series:					155
Total Delivered (All series):					1,573

- Boeing data through end of February 2023.

== See also ==
- List of Boeing 777 operators
- List of Airbus A380 operators
- List of Airbus A350 operators
