= List of Boeing 787 operators =

The following is a list of commercial operators of the Boeing 787 Dreamliner.

== Airline operators ==
Airline	Country	First commercial service	Photo	787-8	787-9	787-10	Total in service	Notes
Aeroméxico	Mexico	September 24, 2013		8	16		24	
Air Austral	Réunion	June 10, 2016		2			2	
Air Canada	Canada	May 23, 2014		8	32		40	
Air China	China	May 26, 2016			14		14	
Air Europa	Spain	April 1, 2016		10	17		27	
Air France	France	January 9, 2017			10		10	
Air India	India	September 19, 2012		26	7		33	One Boeing 787-8 (VT-ANB) written off after crashing as Air India Flight 171.
Air New Zealand	New Zealand	August 9, 2014			14		14	Launch customer of 787-9.
Air Premia	South Korea	March 31, 2021			9		9	
Air Tahiti Nui	French Polynesia	November 1, 2018			4		4	
Air Tanzania	Tanzania	July 29, 2018		3			3	
Alaska Airlines	United States	September 18, 2024			5		5	Acquired from merger with Hawaiian Airlines
All Nippon Airways	Japan	October 26, 2011		36	44	10	90	Launch customer of 787-8. Largest operator overall.
American Airlines	United States	May 7, 2015		37	33		70	Largest 787-8 operator.
Austrian Airlines	Austria	June 17, 2024			3		3	
Avianca	Colombia	January 16, 2015		16			16	
Azerbaijan Airlines	Azerbaijan	March 1, 2015		2			2	
Biman Bangladesh Airlines	Bangladesh	September 5, 2018		4	2		6	
British Airways	United Kingdom	August 9, 2013		12	18	12	42	
China Eastern Airlines	China	November 1, 2018			5		5	
China Southern Airlines	China	June 7, 2013		10	21		31	
Egyptair	Egypt	March 31, 2019			8		8	
El Al	Israel	August 23, 2017		4	12		16	
Ethiopian Airlines	Ethiopia	August 16, 2012		20	11		31	
Etihad Airways	United Arab Emirates	February 1, 2015			37	10	47	
EVA Air	Taiwan	November 1, 2018			7	12	19	
Gulf Air	Bahrain	June 15, 2018			10		10	
Hainan Airlines	China	July 8, 2013		10	28		38	
Iraqi Airways	Iraq	June 22, 2023		2			2	
Japan Airlines	Japan	April 22, 2012		23	22		45	
Jetstar	Australia	November 13, 2013		11			11	
Juneyao Airlines	China	October 25, 2018			9		9	
Kenya Airways	Kenya	June 4, 2014		9			9	
KLM	Netherlands	November 23, 2015			13	14	27	
Korean Air	South Korea	March 7, 2017			14	15	29	787-8 is in BBJ configuration.
LATAM Airlines Group	Chile			10	27		37	
LOT Polish Airlines	Poland	December 14, 2012		8	7		15	
Lufthansa	Germany	August 29, 2022			16		16	
MIAT Mongolian Airlines	Mongolia	August 10, 2023			2		2	
Neos	Italy	December 25, 2017			6		6	
Norse Atlantic Airways	Norway	June 14, 2022			8		8	
Norse Atlantic UK	United Kingdom	March 23, 2023			4		4	
Oman Air	Oman	October 17, 2015		2	8		10	One Boeing 787-8 leased to Qatar Airways. One Boeing 787-9 leased to Riyadh Air.
Qantas	Australia	December 25, 2017			14		14	
Qatar Airways	Qatar	November 20, 2012		31	20		51	130 more Boeing 787s across each variant on order.
Royal Air Maroc	Morocco	January 20, 2015		5	6		11	
Royal Brunei Airlines	Brunei	October 18, 2013		5			5	
Royal Jordanian	Jordan	September 1, 2014		7	1		8	
Saudia	Saudi Arabia	March 11, 2016			13	5	18	
Scoot	Singapore	February 5, 2015		13	10		23	
Shanghai Airlines	China	October 1, 2018			9		9	
Singapore Airlines	Singapore	May 3, 2018				26	26	Launch customer and largest operator of 787-10. Operates the 1000th 787 Dreamliner (9V-SCP).
TAAG Angola Airlines	Angola				1		1	
Thai Airways International	Thailand	July 25, 2014		6	4		10	The order for 45 new 787-9 aircraft was officially confirmed on 20 February 2024; Three aircraft were leased from AerCap with additional order options. Will be the largest operator of Boeing 787 Dreamliner in Southeast Asia once all planes are delivered.
TUI Airways	United Kingdom	July 8, 2013		8	5		13	
TUI fly Belgium (Note: TUI fly Belgium was known as Jetairfly when they first introduced the Boeing 787 into commercial service.)	Belgium	October 19, 2016		1			1	
TUI fly Netherlands (Note: TUI fly Netherlands was known as Arkefly when they first introduced the Boeing 787 into commercial service.)	Netherlands	October 1, 2015		4			4	
TUI fly Nordic	Sweden	September 21, 2021			1		1	
Turkish Airlines	Turkey	July 8, 2019			24		24	
United Airlines	United States	November 4, 2012		12	52	21	85	
Uzbekistan Airways	Uzbekistan	September 5, 2016		7			7	Remaining 787s to be delivered starting 2029.
Vietnam Airlines	Vietnam	August 4, 2015			11	6	17	
Virgin Atlantic	United Kingdom	October 28, 2014			17		17	
WestJet	Canada	April 28, 2019			7		7	
XiamenAir	China	September 3, 2014		6	6		12	
Zipair Tokyo	Japan	October 16, 2020		8			8	787-9 deliveries due to begin in 2027.

== Former operators ==
Airline	Country	First commercial service	Photo	Notes
Air Japan	Japan	February 1, 2024		Ceased operations on March 28, 2026.
Arke	Netherlands	June 8, 2014		Rebranded to TUI fly Netherlands in 2015.
Bamboo Airways	Vietnam	January 1, 2020		2 were transferred to Austrian Airlines.
Hawaiian Airlines	United States	April 15, 2024		Merged with Alaska Airlines
Jetairfly	Belgium	December 8, 2013		Rebranded to TUI fly Belgium in 2016.
LAN Airlines	Chile	October 1, 2012		Rebranded to LATAM Chile in 2016.
Norwegian Air Sweden	Sweden	April 10, 2019		
Norwegian Air UK	United Kingdom	July 20, 2016		Ceased operations in 2021.
Norwegian Long Haul	Norway	May 29, 2015		Ceased operations in 2021.
Suparna Airlines	China	December 15, 2018		787-8 transferred to Hainan Airlines. One 787-9 transferred to MIAT Mongolian Airlines.
Vistara	India	February 29, 2020		Merged with Air India.

== See also ==
- List of Airbus A330 operators
- List of Airbus A350 operators
- List of Boeing 767 operators
- List of Boeing 777 operators
