= List of Airbus A380 operators =

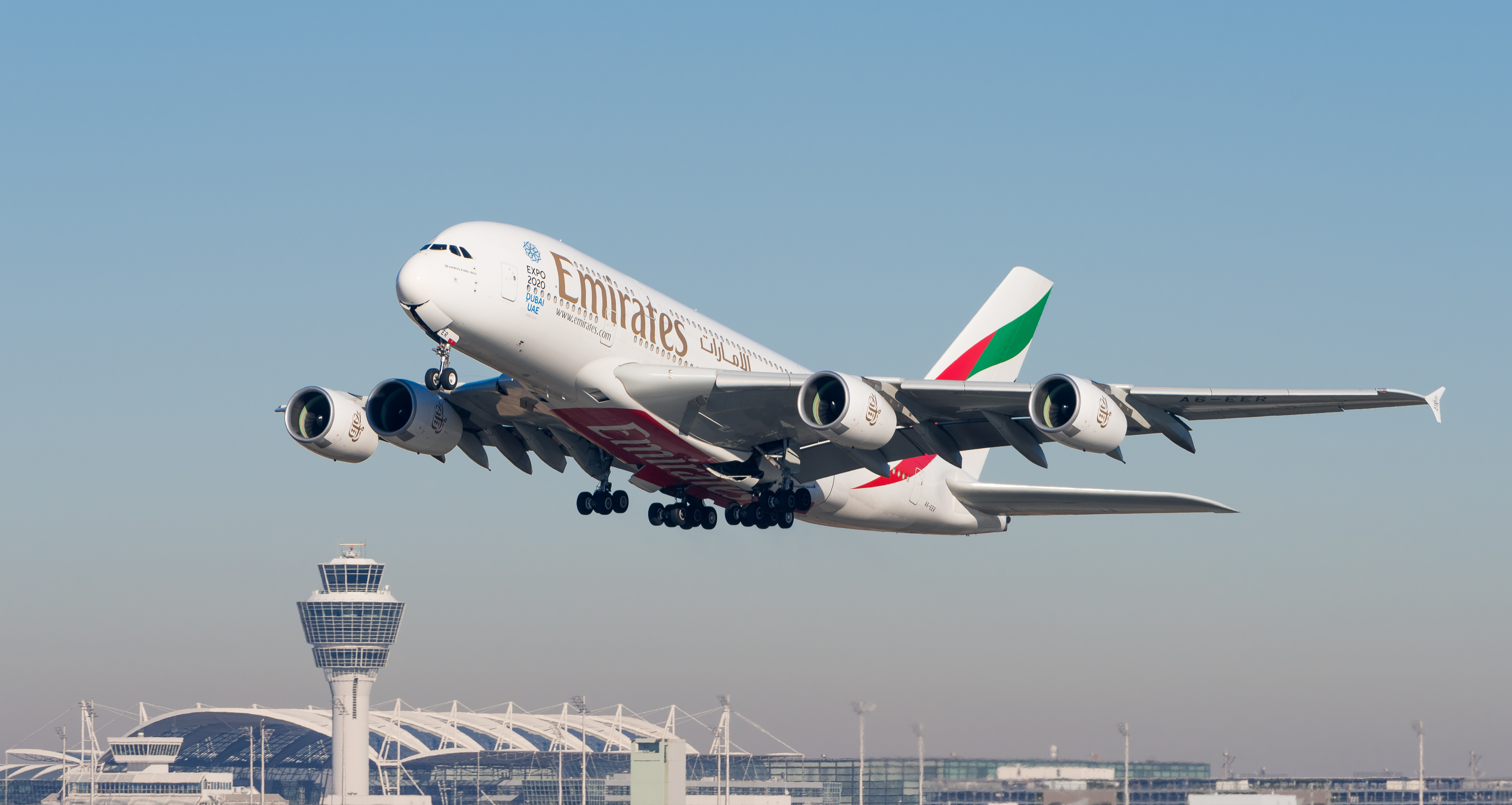
Emirates is the world's largest Airbus A380 operator.

The following is a list of current and former operators of the Airbus A380, the world's largest passenger aircraft.

== Overview ==
The first flight was on April 27, 2005. Singapore Airlines was the first carrier to operate the A380 in October 2007. Emirates, one of the two flag carriers of the United Arab Emirates, is the largest operator, with 121 aircraft in its fleet, including the last one, which was delivered in 2021.

The COVID-19 pandemic significantly affected the global A380 fleet, prompting some airlines to cease its operation entirely. Prior to the pandemic, the aircraft had already been slated for gradual retirement due to operational inflexibility and high fuel consumption. However, delays in the delivery of newer models, the surge in global travel demand led to a renewed appreciation for the aircraft, resulting in its reintroduction by major airlines.

As of August 2025, a total of 186 A380s remain in service, while 36 are stored, and 24 have been scrapped.

== Operators by country ==
These airlines have the Airbus A380 in the fleet. Fleet numbers are current as of June 2026.

| Airline | Country | Photo | Entry Year | Last Delivery | Current | Retired | Notes |
|---|---|---|---|---|---|---|---|
| All Nippon Airways | (Japan) | | 2019 | 2021 | 3 | — | Last "new" customer to order the A380. |
| Asiana Airlines | (South Korea) | | 2014 | 2016 | 6 | — | Planned 2026 retirement postponed - Awaiting delayed A350 replacement. |
| British Airways | (United Kingdom) | | 2013 | 2016 | 12 | — | |
| Emirates | (United Arab Emirates) | | 2008 | 2021 | 116 (21 parked) | 7 | World's largest A380 operator. |
| Etihad Airways | (United Arab Emirates) | | 2014 | 2018 | 9 | 1 | |
| Korean Air | (South Korea) | | 2011 | 2014 | 5 | 5 | To be retired before 2031. |
| Lufthansa | (Germany) | | 2010 | 2013 | 8 | 6 | To be retired after 2030. 6 of their 14 total A380s have been returned to Airbus. |
| Qantas | (Australia) | | 2008 | 2011 | 10 | 2 | To be phased out from 2028. One involved in Flight 32. |
| Qatar Airways | (Qatar) | | 2014 | 2017 | 8 | 2 | To be replaced with Airbus A350-1000 aircraft in 2035. |
| Singapore Airlines | (Singapore) | | 2007 | 2017 | 12 | 12 | Launch customer of the A380. |

== Former operators ==
The aircraft type was operated by these airlines in the past:

| Airline | Country | Photo | Total | Entry year | Exit year | Cause of retirement | Notes |
|---|---|---|---|---|---|---|---|
| Air France | (France) | | 10 | 2009 | 2020 | COVID-19 and high fuel costs | First airline to completely remove all A380s from its fleet. One involved in Flight 066. |
| China Southern Airlines | (China) | | 5 | 2011 | 2022 | High fuel costs | |
| Global Airlines | (United Kingdom) | | 1 (Note: formerly China Southern Airlines.) | 2024 | 2026 | Airline Ceased Operations | Operated by Hi Fly Malta. Former China Southern Airlines aircraft. Lone airframe currently parked indefinitely. Second shortest operator of the A380, only operating it for 2 years and 9 months. |
| Hi Fly Malta | (Malta) | | 1 (Note: formerly Singapore Airlines.) | 2018 | 2020 | COVID-19 | Shortest operator of the A380, only operating it for 2 years and 5 months. |
| Malaysia Airlines | (Malaysia) | | 6 | 2012 | 2022 | COVID-19 and high fuel costs | |
| Thai Airways International | (Thailand) | | 6 | 2012 | 2020 | COVID-19 and high fuel costs | Third shortest operator of the A380, only operating it for 8–9 years. |

Updated: November 2026

== See also ==
- List of Airbus A380 orders and deliveries
- List of Airbus A340 operators
- List of Boeing 747 operators
- List of Boeing 777 operators
- List of Airbus A350 operators
- Seat configurations of Airbus A380
