= Cargolux Italia =

Cargo airline of Italy

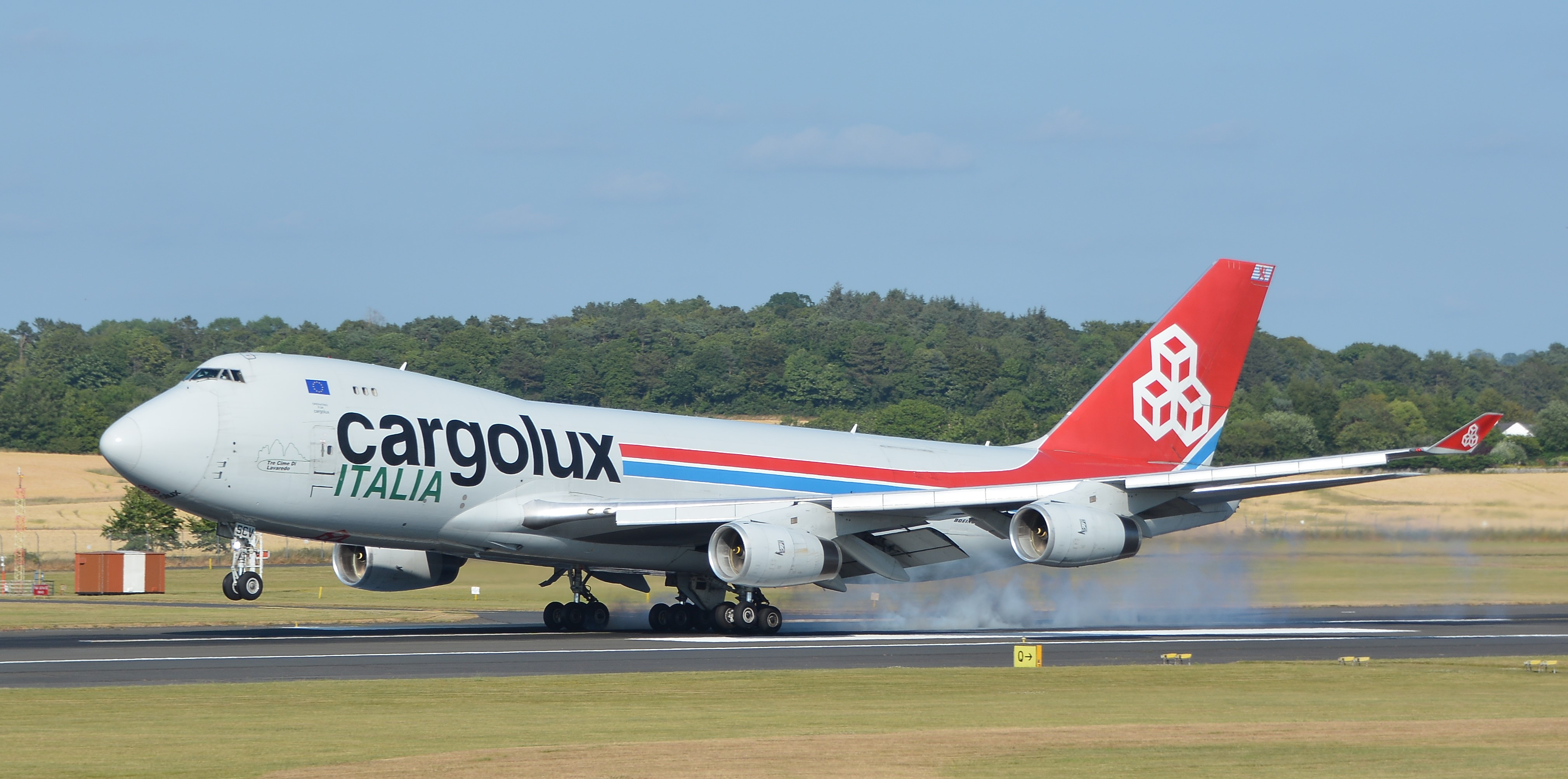
- Boeing 747-400F
IATA	ICAO	Call sign
C8	ICV	CARGOLUX ITALIA
- Founded: December 2008; 17 years ago
- Commenced operations: June 2009; 17 years ago
- Hubs: Milan Malpensa Airport
- Fleet size: 4
- Destinations: 22
- Parent company: Cargolux
- Headquarters: Vizzola Ticino, Italy
- Website: www.cargolux-italia.com

Cargolux Italia S.p.A. is an Italian cargo airline, set up as a joint venture between various Italian investors and the Luxembourgish Cargolux. Its head office is located at Vizzola Ticino and its hub is Milan Malpensa Airport. The airline was established in December 2008 and commenced operations in June 2009.

== Destinations ==
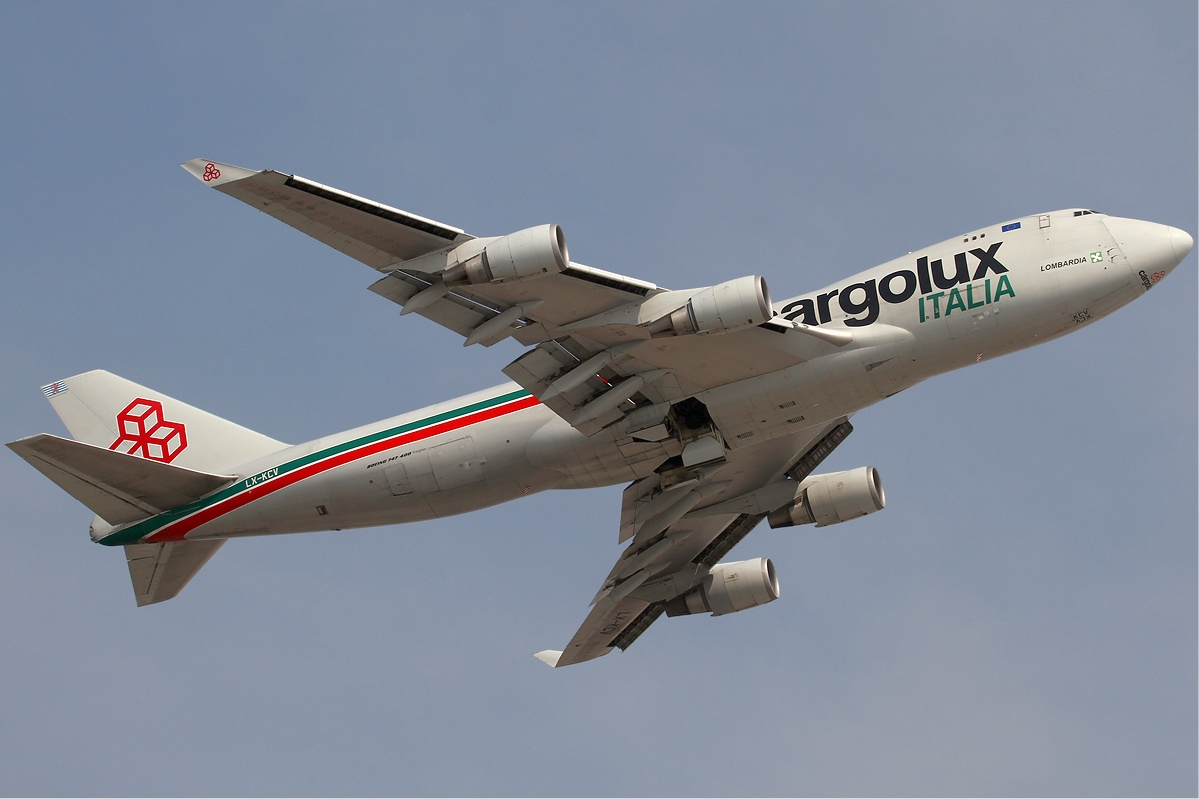
A Boeing 747-400F in former livery

Cargolux Italia serves the following destinations with scheduled cargo flights:

Country	City	Airport	Notes
China	Hong Kong	Hong Kong International Airport	
China	Zhengzhou	Zhengzhou Xinzheng International Airport	
Côte d'Ivoire (Ivory Coast)	Abidjan	Félix-Houphouët-Boigny International Airport	
Democratic Republic of Congo	Kinshasa	N'djili Airport	
Estonia	Tallinn	Tallinn Airport	
Ghana	Accra	Accra International Airport	
Italy	Milan	Milan Malpensa Airport	Hub
Kenya	Nairobi	Jomo Kenyatta International Airport	
Kuwait	Kuwait City	Kuwait International Airport	
Latvia	Riga	Riga International Airport	
Lithuania	Vilnius	Vilnius Airport	
Luxembourg	Luxembourg	Luxembourg Airport	
Mali	Bamako	Bamako–Sénou International Airport	
Nigeria	Lagos	Murtala Muhammed International Airport	
Nigeria	Port Harcourt	Port Harcourt International Airport	
Puerto Rico	San Juan	Luis Muñoz Marín International Airport	
Republic of Congo	Brazzaville	Maya-Maya Airport	
Russia	Novosibirsk	Tolmachevo Airport	Terminated
South Africa	Johannesburg	O. R. Tambo International Airport	
South Korea	Seoul	Incheon International Airport	
Turkey	Istanbul	Atatürk Airport	Airport Closed
Turkey	Istanbul	Istanbul Airport	
United Arab Emirates	Dubai	Al Maktoum International Airport	
United Kingdom	London	London Stansted Airport	

== Fleet ==
=== Current fleet ===
As of July 2026, Cargolux Italia operates the following aircraft:

Cargolux Italia fleet
Aircraft	In service	Orders	Notes
Boeing 747-400F	4	—	
Total	4	—	

=== Former fleet ===
As of August 2025, Cargolux Italia operated 4 Boeing 747-400F.
