= Cargolux =

Cargo airline of Luxembourg

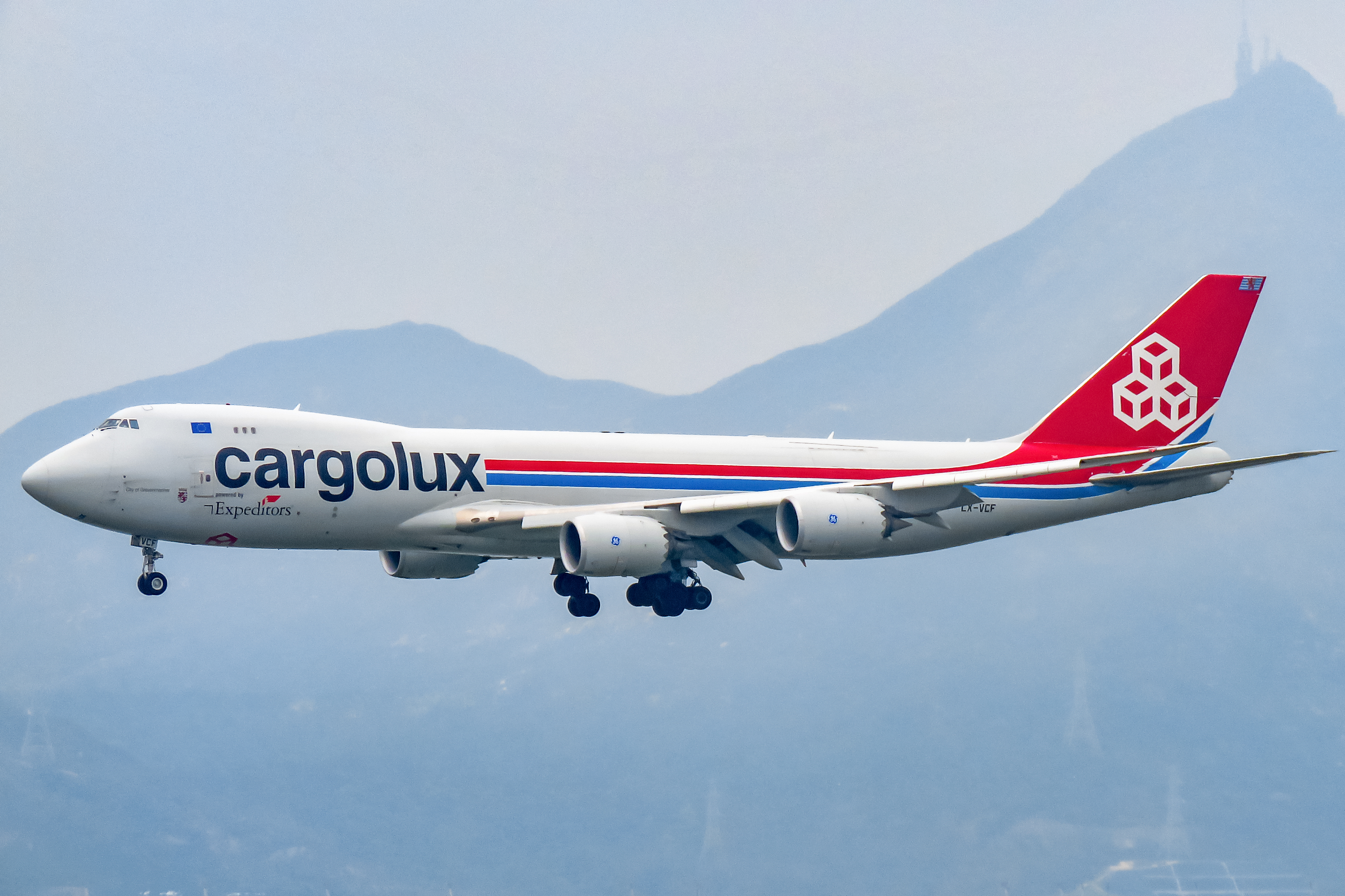
- Cargolux 747-8R7F in standard livery
IATA	ICAO	Call sign
CV	CLX	CARGOLUX
- Founded: 4 March 1970; 56 years ago
- Commenced operations: May 1970; 56 years ago
- Hubs: Luxembourg Airport
- Subsidiaries: Cargolux Italia
- Fleet size: 26
- Destinations: 90
- Headquarters: Sandweiler, Luxembourg
- Key people: Richard Forson (President & CEO)
- Employees: 2,000 (2018)
- Website: www.cargolux.com

Cargolux, officially known as Cargolux Airlines International S.A., is the flag carrier cargo airline of Luxembourg, with its headquarters and hub at Luxembourg Airport. With a global network, it is among the largest scheduled all-cargo airlines in the world. The airline also offers charter flights and third-party maintenance. It has 85 offices in over 50 countries as of 2018, and operates a global trucking network to more than 250 destinations.

== History ==
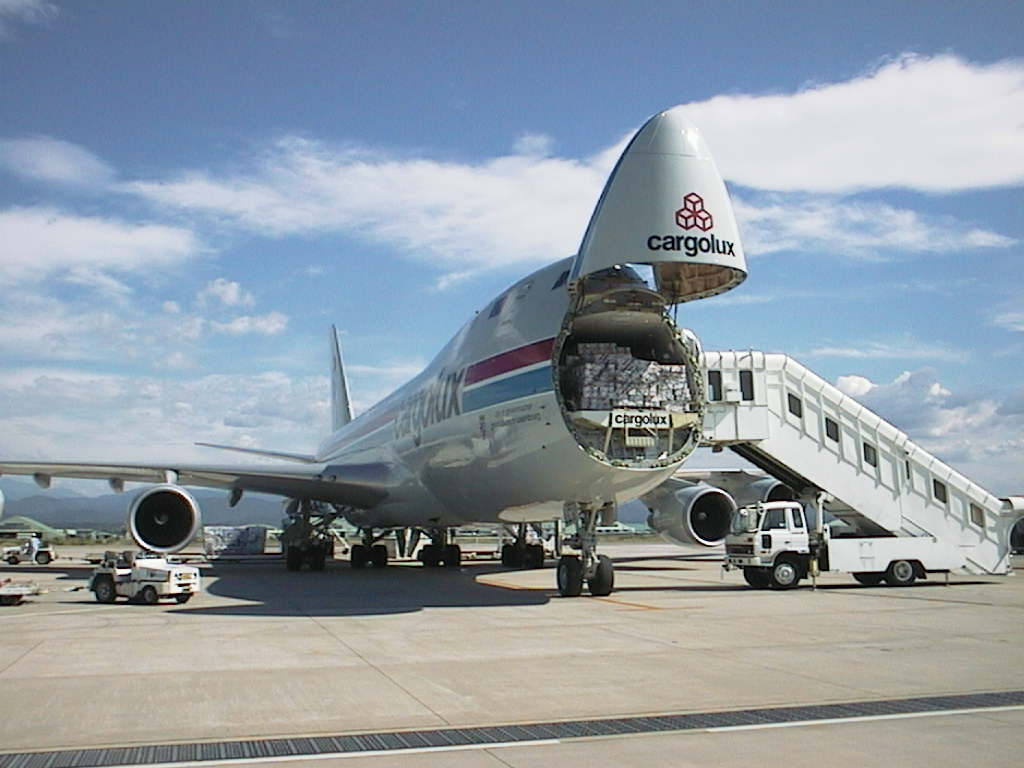
A Cargolux Boeing 747-400F during loading

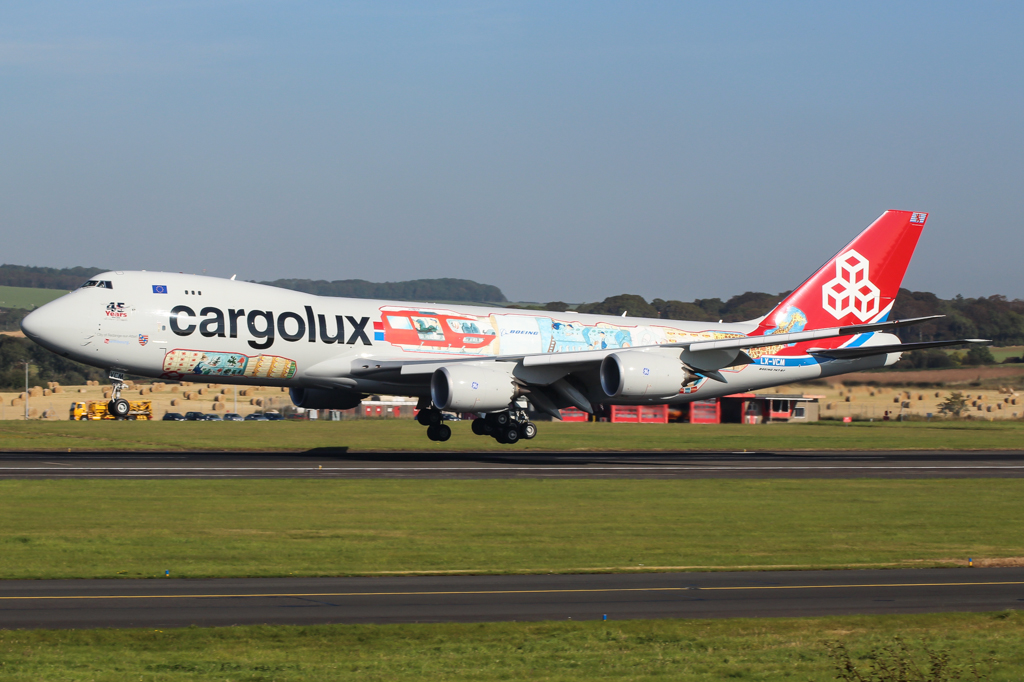
A Cargolux Boeing 747-8F in a special "cutaway" livery celebrating the airline's 45th anniversary.

The airline was established in March 1970 by Luxair, the Salen Shipping Group, Loftleiðir, and various private interests in Luxembourg. Einar Ólafsson was the airline's first employee and CEO. It started operations in May 1970 with one Canadair CL-44 freighter with services from Luxembourg to Hong Kong. Over the next two years, the airline grew, as did its public visibility.

By 1973, Cargolux had five CL-44s and made the leap into the jet age by acquiring a Douglas DC-8. This enabled the company to speed up its cargo deliveries. In 1974, Loftleiðir and Cargolux amalgamated their maintenance and engineering departments, and by 1975, Cargolux enjoyed new facilities consisting of central offices and two hangars.

In 1978, the airline began to take shape into the company it is today. The CL-44s began to be retired and the airline ordered its first Boeing 747s. In that same year it also began flying to other places in Asia, as well as to the United States. In 1979, as the company concluded its first decade, its first Boeing 747s were delivered.

In 1982, China Airlines became the first airline company to sign a strategic alliance with Cargolux.

1983 saw the introduction of the CHAMP (Cargo Handling and Management Planning) computer system and the start of some charter passenger flights for the Hajj pilgrimage.

1984 saw the departure of the last Douglas DC-8 in the fleet and the addition of a third Boeing 747. Lufthansa bought a 24.5% share of the airline in 1987 and Luxair increased its share to 24.53%.

1988 saw the birth of Lion Air, a passenger charter airline established by both Cargolux and Luxair. The airline had two Boeing 747s but Cargolux's venture into the passenger charter airline world proved to be an issue with the Luxembourg government and soon Lion Air folded.

Despite that setback, Cargolux made it into the 1990s in proper financial shape. It added two more Boeing 747s in 1990, as a way of celebrating its 20th anniversary, and in 1993, three Boeing 747-400Fs arrived at Luxembourg. In 1995 Cargolux had a year-long celebration of its 25th anniversary and Heiner Wilkens was named CEO and President.

In 1997, Luxair was able to increase its share to 34%, while in September that year Lufthansa sold its 24.5% stake to SAir Logistics; and Swissair Cargo made a cooperation agreement with the Luxembourg company. The following year SAir Logistics increased its share to 33%.

By 1999, Cargolux's fleet had reached double figures, with 10 Boeing 747s. In 2000 a route was opened to Seoul, South Korea, and in 2001 Wilkens decided to step down as president and CEO of the air company.

In 2006, Cargolux built a new hangar which can hold two Boeing 747s simultaneously. It houses the maintenance and engineering department, which at the time had over 490 maintenance employees.

In October 2010, Ulrich Ogiermann, the chief executive officer of Cargolux was indicted on suspicion of price-fixing; After pleading guilty, he was sentenced to 13 months in federal prison. In November 2010, Cargolux was fined for price-fixing by the European Commission.

On 8 September 2011, Qatar Airways purchased a 35% share in the company making it the second largest shareholder after Luxair (43.4%). The other shareholders were the Banque et Caisse d'Epargne de l'Etat (10.9%) and the Société Nationale de Crédit et d'Investissement (10.7%). In November 2012 Qatar Airways announced plans to sell its stake after strategic differences with other major shareholders such as whether the interim CEO and CFO, Richard Forson, should become the permanent CEO. Unions had claimed Forson was effectively a Qatar Airways representative after comments he made about relocating maintenance to the Middle East and rumours of plans for aircraft to be re-registered in Qatar. Qatar Airways sold its share to the Government of Luxembourg, which then sold that share to Henan Civil Aviation Development and Investment, a Chinese company, for $120 million in 2014. As part of that agreement, Cargolux launched a service from Luxembourg to Zhengzhou in Henan. According to the Dutch OSINT platform Datenna, Henan Civil Aviation's stake in Cargolux leads to a high risk of state influence on Cargolux by the Chinese government. In 2017, Cargolux entered into a joint venture with Henan Civil Aviation Development and Investment to create Henan Cargo Airlines, and holds a 25% stake in the operation.

On 17 September 2011, Cargolux announced that it would not accept the first two Boeing 747-8F aircraft it had ordered, scheduled for delivery within a few days, due to "unresolved contractual issues between Boeing and [the airline]" concerning the aircraft. After resolving their contractual issues, Boeing handed over the first 747-8F to Cargolux in Everett, Washington, on 12 October 2011. The freighter then flew to Seattle–Tacoma International Airport and picked up cargo before flying to Luxembourg.

In 2019, Cargolux sponsored a flight for two Beluga whales from China to a marine wildlife sanctuary in Iceland, in partnership with the Sea Life Trust and the Whale and Dolphin Conservation.

Cargo 2000 (now Cargo iQ) — an industry group within the International Air Transport Association (IATA) consisting of some 80 major airlines, freight forwarders, ground handling agents, trucking companies and IT providers — announced on 15 March 2012 at its annual general meeting, that Cargolux Airlines International S.A. had gained Cargo 2000 platinum membership status.

In June 2020, Cargolux and Unilode extended their partnership with a new agreement.

In 2022, Cargolux sold its remaining shares in CHAMP Cargosystems to SITA.

Cargolux inaugurated a new aerial firefighting business unit in 2024, which will operate a fleet of 12 aircraft, three of which have already been delivered. Also in 2024, Cargolux and Norwegian Air Shuttle signed a contract for more than 140,000 tonnes of e-SAF (e-Sustainable Aviation Fuel) to be supplied by Norsk e-Fuel from 2026.

== Destinations ==
Cargolux covers 90 destinations, 70 of which are served on scheduled all-cargo flights as of 2018.

Country/Region	City	Airport	Notes	Refs
Austria	Vienna	Vienna International Airport		
Bahrain	Manama	Bahrain International Airport		
Brazil	Campinas	Viracopos International Airport		
Brazil	Curitiba	Afonso Pena International Airport		
Brazil	Rio de Janeiro	Rio de Janeiro/Galeão International Airport		
Canada	Calgary	Calgary International Airport		
China	Beijing	Beijing Capital International Airport		
China	Shanghai	Shanghai Pudong International Airport		
China	Xiamen	Xiamen Gaoqi International Airport		
China	Zhengzhou	Zhengzhou Xinzheng International Airport		
Ecuador	Quito	Mariscal Sucre International Airport		
Hong Kong	Hong Kong	Hong Kong International Airport		
Hungary	Budapest	Budapest Ferenc Liszt International Airport		
Indonesia	Jakarta	Soekarno–Hatta International Airport		
Italy	Milan	Milan Malpensa Airport		
Japan	Komatsu	Komatsu Airport		
Japan	Tokyo	Narita International Airport		
Kenya	Nairobi	Jomo Kenyatta International Airport		
Luxembourg	Luxembourg City	Luxembourg Airport	Hub	
Malaysia	Kuala Lumpur	Kuala Lumpur International Airport		
Malaysia	Penang	Penang International Airport		
Mexico	Guadalajara	Guadalajara International Airport		
Mexico	Mexico City	Felipe Ángeles International Airport		
Netherlands	Amsterdam	Amsterdam Airport Schiphol		
Puerto Rico	San Juan	Luis Muñoz Marín International Airport		
Singapore	Singapore	Changi Airport		
South Africa	Johannesburg	O. R. Tambo International Airport		
South Korea	Seoul	Incheon International Airport		
Taiwan	Taipei	Taoyuan International Airport		
Thailand	Bangkok	Suvarnabhumi Airport		
Turkmenistan	Ashgabat	Ashgabat International Airport		
United Arab Emirates	Dubai	Al Maktoum International Airport		
United Kingdom	Glasgow	Glasgow Prestwick Airport		
United Kingdom	London	London Stansted Airport		
United States	Atlanta	Hartsfield–Jackson Atlanta International Airport		
United States	Chicago	O'Hare International Airport		
United States	Dallas	Dallas Fort Worth International Airport		
United States	Houston	George Bush Intercontinental Airport		
United States	Indianapolis	Indianapolis International Airport		
United States	Los Angeles	Los Angeles International Airport		
United States	Miami	Miami International Airport		
United States	New York City	John F. Kennedy International Airport		
United States	Seattle	Seattle–Tacoma International Airport		
Vietnam	Hanoi	Noi Bai International Airport		
Vietnam	Ho Chi Minh City	Tan Son Nhat International Airport		

=== Interline agreements ===
- My Freighter Airlines

== Fleet ==
=== Current fleet ===
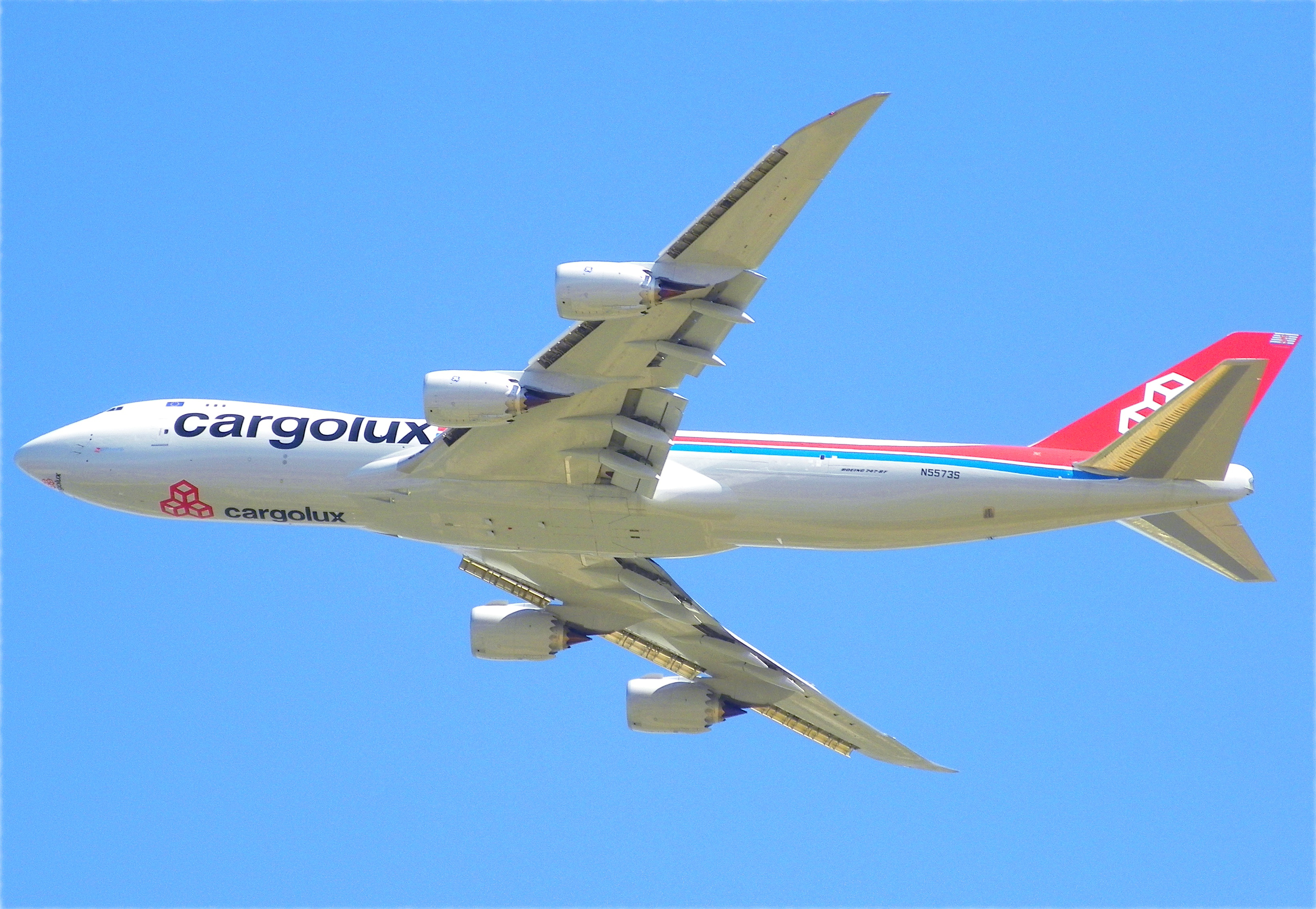
A Cargolux Boeing 747-8F

As of July 2026, Cargolux operates the following aircraft:

Cargolux fleet
Aircraft	In service	Orders	Notes
Boeing 747-400ERF	6	—	
Boeing 747-400F	6	—	
Boeing 747-8F	14	—	Launch customer. Includes the Boeing 747-8 prototype.
Boeing 777-8F	—	10	Order with 6 options. To receive deliveries by 2027.
Total	26	10	

=== Former fleet ===
As of August 2025, Cargolux operated 6 Boeing 747-400ERF, 6 Boeing 747-400F and 14 Boeing 747-8F

== Accidents and incidents ==
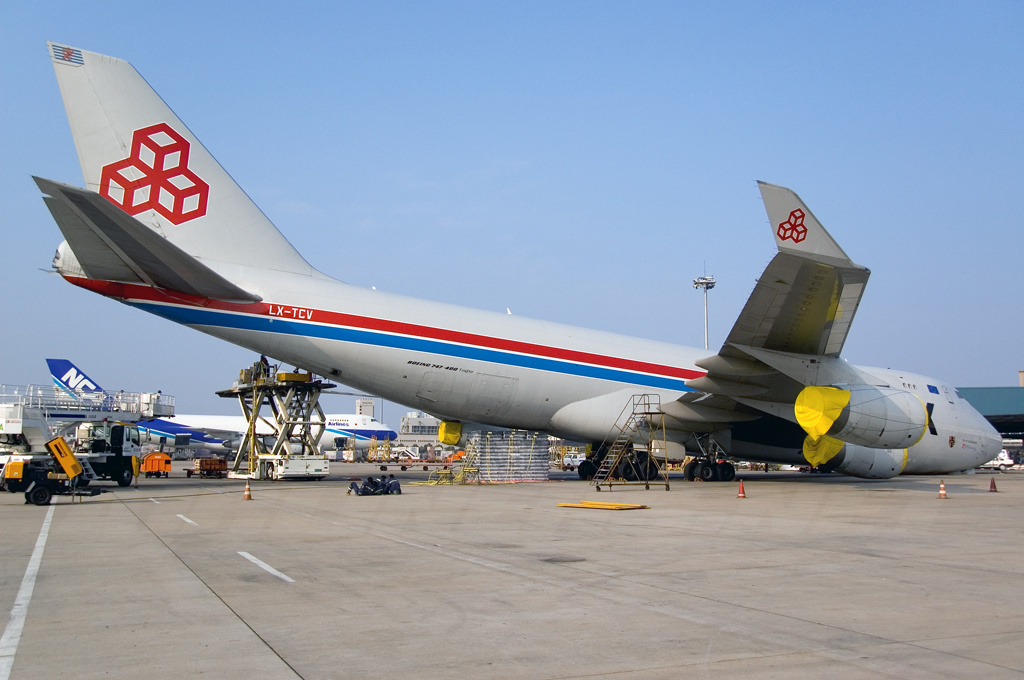
A Cargolux 747-400F with registration "LX-TCV" involved in an accident where the landing gear collapsed while the aircraft was still on the ground (Shanghai Pudong International Airport, January 2006)

- 2 December 1970: Canadair CL-44J, aircraft registration TF-LLG, crashed on approach to Tejgaon Airport. All four crew members and three people on the ground were killed. Investigators concluded that the gust lock system engaged and locked the controls in flight due to a hydraulic fault.
- 1 November 1992: Boeing 747-228F LX-DCV was substantially damaged when the outermost right-hand engine was torn away and the engine pylon was pushed through the wing on touchdown at Luxembourg-Findel Airport (LUX).
- 21 January 2010: Boeing 747-4R7F LX-OCV, operating as Flight 7933, touched down on the roof of a maintenance van on the active runway at LUX, badly damaging the van and causing minor damage to an aircraft tire. The 747 taxied to the parking area without incident. The accident was attributed to the failure of air traffic control (ATC) to ensure that the maintenance crew had cleared the runway, inadequate coordination between ATC and the airport maintenance department, and the inappropriate decision to perform maintenance on an active runway in low visibility.
- 14 May 2023: Boeing 747-4R7F LX-OCV, operating as Flight CV6857 returned to Luxembourg Airport (ELLX) after one of the center landing gear bogie's tilted down while on takeoff. The aircraft was unable to retract the landing gear and declared an emergency. After holding and dumping around 40 tons fuel over Belgium the aircraft returned to Luxembourg where the right-hand center landing gear broke off and struck the lower aft fuselage multiple times as well as the right-hand horizontal stabilizer. The aircraft was repaired and returned to service. The aircraft had also previously been involved in an incident in 2010 where it struck a maintenance van while landing.

== See also ==
- Cargolux Italia
