= List of Boeing 767 operators =

The following is a list of current commercial operators of the Boeing 767, and any of its variants.

== Current airline operators ==
Airline	767- 200	767-200 freighter	767- 200ER	767-200ER freighter	767- 300	767- 300ER	767-300/ER freighter	767- 400ER	767 Fleet
21 Air	—	1	—	2	—	—	10	—	13
ABX Air	—	8	—	—	—	—	25	—	33
Aeronexus	—	—	—	—	—	1	—	—	1
Air Astana	—	—	—	—	—	3	—	—	3
Air Canada Cargo	—	—	—	—	—	—	6	—	6
Air Do	—	—	—	—	—	4	—	—	4
Air Niugini	—	—	—	—	—	2	—	—	2
Air Transport International	—	7	—	—	—	—	38	—	45
Air Zimbabwe	—	—	2	—	—	—	—	—	2
AirZeta	—	—	—	—	—	—	1	—	1
All Nippon Airways	—	—	—	—	—	15	6	—	21
Amerijet International	—	1	—	—	—	—	12	—	13
Astral Aviation	—	1	—	—	—	—	1	—	2
Atlas Air	—	—	—	—	—	5	25	—	30
Austrian Airlines	—	—	—	—	—	3	—	—	3
Azerbaijan Airlines	—	—	—	—	—	3	—	—	3
Azur Air	—	—	—	—	—	7	—	—	7
Cargojet	—	—	—	2	—	—	23	—	25
Delta Air Lines	—	—	—	—	—	37	—	21	58
DHL Air UK	—	5	—	—	—	—	8	—	13
DHL International Aviation ME	—	—	—	—	—	—	10	—	10
Eastern Airlines	—	—	3	—	—	4	—	—	8
EuroAtlantic Airways	—	—	—	—	—	3	—	—	3
Ethiopian Airlines	—	—	—	—	—	—	4	—	4
FedEx Express	—	—	—	—	—	—	145	—	145
Flykhiva	—	—	—	—	—	—	1	—	1
Icelandair	—	—	—	—	—	3	1	—	4
Japan Airlines	—	—	—	—	—	24	3	—	27
Jordan Aviation	—	—	1	—	—	—	—	—	1
Knight Sky II	—	—	1	—	—	—	—	—	1
LATAM Airlines Group	—	—	—	—	—	9	20	—	29
Maersk Air Cargo (Note: formerly Star Air)	—	5	—	5	—	—	7	—	17
MIAT Mongolian Airlines	—	—	—	—	—	1	—	—	1
My Freighter Airlines	—	—	—	—	—	—	6	—	6
Omni Air International	—	—	3	—	—	9	—	—	12
Raya Airways	—	—	—	5	—	—	—	—	5
Royal Air Maroc	—	—	—	—	—	—	1	—	1
Samaritan's Purse	—	—	—	—	—	—	1	—	1
SF Airlines	—	—	—	—	—	—	23	—	23
Sky Taxi	—	1	—	—	—	—	2	—	3
Skyline Express	—	—	—	—	—	3	—	—	3
SpaceBee Airlines	—	2	—	—	—	—	—	—	2
Sunday Airlines	—	—	—	—	—	1	—	—	1
United Airlines	—	—	—	—	—	37	—	16	53
UPS Airlines	—	—	—	—	—	—	99	—	99
UTair Aviation	—	—	3	—	—	—	—	—	3
Uzbekistan Airways	—	—	—	—	—	5	2	—	7
Weststar Aviation	—	—	1	—	—	—	—	—	1
Total fleet	—	31	14	14	—	179	476	37	751

== Former airline operators ==
Former operators of the Boeing 767 were for example:

- Aeroméxico
- American Airlines
- British Airways – retired last 767s in December 2018
- El Al
- Lloyd Aéreo Boliviano

== Current government and military operators ==
Brazil

- Brazilian Air Force – one 767-300ER

Italy

- Italian Air Force – four Boeing KC-767
