= List of Boeing 777 operators =

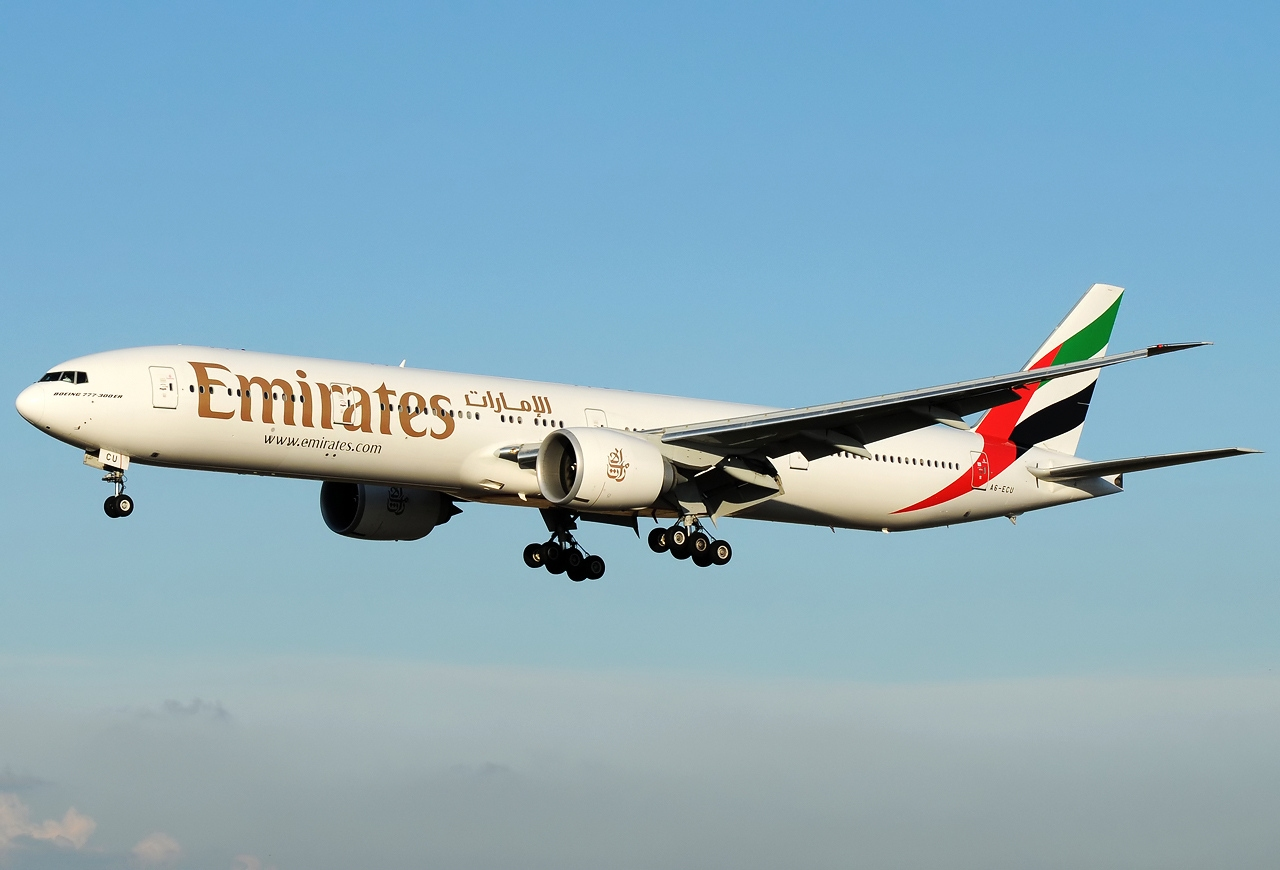
An Emirates 777-300ER. Emirates is the largest operator of the Boeing 777 with 133 aircraft as of November 2023.

The following is a list of airlines that operate the Boeing 777.

The Boeing 777 is a long-range wide-body twin-engine jet airliner designed and manufactured by Boeing Commercial Airplanes, the commercial business unit of Boeing. Commonly referred to as the "Triple Seven", it is the largest twinjet. The 777 can accommodate between 301 and 450 (Air Canada High Density) passengers in a three-class layout, and has a range of 5,235 to 9,380 nautical miles (9,695 to 17,372 km), depending on the model. Developed in consultation with eight major airlines, the 777 was designed to replace older wide-body airliners and bridge the capacity difference between the 767 and 747.

The 777 is produced in two fuselage lengths. The original 777-200 model first entered service in 1995, followed by the extended-range 777-200ER in 1997. The stretched 777-300, which is 33.3 ft (10.1 m) longer, began service in 1998. The longer-range 777-300ER and 777-200LR variants entered service in 2004 and 2006, respectively, while a freighter version, the 777F, debuted in 2009.

United Airlines first placed the 777 into commercial airline service in 1995. The most successful variant is the 777-300ER with 799 aircraft delivered and over 844 orders to date. Emirates operates the largest 777 fleet with 148 aircraft. FedEx Express operates the largest fleet of the 777F cargo aircraft. As of April 2024, 2,268 Boeing 777s, of all variants, have been ordered and 1,729 have been delivered.

== Model summary ==
United Airlines placed the launch order for the 777 program on 14 October 1990 when it purchased 34 Pratt & Whitney PW4084-powered 777-200s valued at US$11 billion with options on an additional 34. The 777-200 entered into service with United Airlines on 7 June 1995 with its first flight from London Heathrow Airport to Dulles International Airport. From day one, the 777 was awarded 180-minute ETOPS clearance by the Federal Aviation Administration, making it the first airliner to carry an ETOPS-180 clearance into service. This would later be increased to 207 minutes by October 1996. (Note: 180-minute ETOPS approval was granted to the General Electric GE90-powered 777 on 3 October 1996, and to the Rolls-Royce Trent 800-powered 777 on 10 October 1996.) British Airways placed the first model with General Electric GE90-77B engines into service on 17 November 1995. The first Rolls-Royce Trent 877-powered aircraft was delivered to Thai Airways International on 31 March 1996, completing the introduction of the three power-plants initially developed for the airliner.

Subsequent versions of the 777, including the 777-200ER, 777-200LR, 777-300, 777-300ER, 777F and the upcoming 777-8X and -9X, have been launched by Air France, British Airways, Cathay Pacific, and Pakistan International Airlines (PIA). The following table lists milestone dates for each model of the aircraft.

In July 2009, Emirates surpassed Singapore Airlines as the biggest 777 operator, when the 78th aircraft was delivered. Since 2010, Emirates is the largest Boeing 777 operator, with 152 aircraft; the carrier began phasing out older −200s, −200ERs and −300s in February 2011. Other primary operators are United Airlines (96), Qatar Airways (81), Air France (70), American Airlines (67), and Cathay Pacific (52). As of November 2011, 62 airline customers operated variants of the Boeing 777.

Model	Launch order	Launch customer	Go-ahead	Rollout	Maiden flight	Certification	First Delivery	Service entry
777-200	15 Oct 1990	United Airlines	29 Oct 1990	9 Apr 1994	12 Jun 1994	19 Apr 1995	15 May 1995	7 Jun 1995
777-200ER	14 Jun 1991	British Airways	29 Oct 1990	3 Sep 1996	7 Oct 1996	17 Jan 1997	6 Feb 1997	9 Feb 1997
777-200LR	27 Feb 2000	Pakistan International Airlines	29 Feb 2000	15 Feb 2005	8 Mar 2005	2 Feb 2006	27 Feb 2006	3 Mar 2006
777-300	14 Jun 1995	Cathay Pacific	26 Jun 1995	8 Sep 1997	16 Oct 1997	4 May 1998	21 May 1998	27 May 1998
777-300ER	31 Mar 2000	Air France	29 Feb 2000	14 Nov 2002	24 Feb 2003	16 Mar 2004	29 Apr 2004	10 May 2004
777F	24 May 2005	Air France	24 May 2005	21 May 2008	14 Jul 2008	6 Feb 2009	19 Feb 2009	22 Feb 2009

== Current operators ==
The following table lists active operators of the aircraft.

Airline	Country / Region	200	200ER	200LR	300	300ER	Freighter	Total
Aeroflot	Russia					22		22
AeroLogic	Germany						25	25
Air Austral	Réunion					3		3
Air Canada	Canada			6		19		25
Air China	China					20		20
Air China Cargo	China						12	12
Air France	France		25			43	2	63
Air India	India			5		19		24
Air New Zealand	New Zealand					10		10
Air Peace	Nigeria		2		2			4
Alexandria Airlines	Egypt				1			1
All Nippon Airways	Japan	2	8		3	13	2	28
American Airlines	United States		47			20		67
Asiana Airlines	South Korea		9					9
Atlas Air	United States						18	18
Austrian Airlines	Austria		6					6
Azerbaijan Airlines	Azerbaijan			1				1
Azur Air	Russia					7		7
Biman Bangladesh Airlines	Bangladesh					4		4
British Airways	United Kingdom		43			16		59
Cathay Pacific	Hong Kong				17	33		50
Central Airlines	China						5	5
China Airlines	Taiwan					10	10	20
China Cargo Airlines	China						15	15
China Eastern Airlines	China					20		20
China Southern Airlines	China					10	14	24
CMA CGM Air Cargo	France						2	2
DHL Air UK	United Kingdom						7	7
EgyptAir	Egypt					5		5
El Al	Israel		4					4
Emirates	United Arab Emirates			10		118		128
Emirates SkyCargo	United Arab Emirates					1	12	13
Ethiopian Airlines	Ethiopia			6		5	12	23
Etihad Airways	United Arab Emirates					9	5	14
EuroAtlantic Airways	Portugal		2					2
EVA Air	Taiwan					33	9	42
FedEx Express	United States						59	59
Garuda Indonesia	Indonesia					10		10
Ikar	Russia		2					2
Iraqi Airways	Iraq			1				1
Japan Airlines	Japan					9		9
Jin Air	South Korea		4					4
Kalitta Air	United States					2	8	10
Kenya Airways	Kenya					1		1
KLM	Netherlands		15			14		29
Korean Air	South Korea		3		4	25	12	44
Kuwait Airways	Kuwait					10		10
LATAM Brasil	Brazil					10		10
Lufthansa Cargo	Germany						12	12
Maersk Air Cargo	Denmark						2	2
Mahan Air	Iran		2					2
Mavi Gök Airlines	Turkey					1		1
Mid East Jet	Saudi Arabia		1					1
MSC Air Cargo	United States						7	7
National Airlines	United States		2					2
Nordwind Airlines	Russia		2			3		5
Omni Air International	United States		3					3
Pakistan International Airlines	Pakistan		6	2		2		10
Philippine Airlines	Philippines					10		10
Polar Air Cargo	United States						2	2
Qatar Airways	Qatar			7		57	28	92
Red Wings Airlines	Russia		3					3
Rossiya Airlines	Russia				5	5		10
Saudia	Saudi Arabia					35	4	39
Silk Way West Airlines	Azerbaijan						2	2
Singapore Airlines	Singapore					25	5	30
Skyline Express	Ukraine					1		1
Southwind Airlines	Turkey				3	1		4
Swiss International Air Lines	Switzerland					12		12
TAAG Angola Airlines	Angola		3			5		8
Thai Airways	Thailand		3			17		20
Turkish Airlines	Turkey					36	8	44
Turkmenistan Airlines	Turkmenistan			4				4
United Airlines	United States	12	52			22		86
Airliner fleet	Global	14	247	42	35	581	289	1,208

== Government operators ==
Operators	777-200	777-200ER	777-200LR	777-300	777-300ER	777F	777 Fleet
Equatorial Guinea Govt	–	–	1	–	–	–	1
Indian Air Force	–	-	–	–	2	–	2
Indonesian Government (Leased from Garuda Indonesia)	-	-	-	-	2	-	2
Japan Air Self-Defense Force	–	–	–	–	2	–	2
Presidential Flight UAE	–	1	–	–	1	–	2
Saudi Royal Flight	-	-	-	-	2	-	2
Aircraft fleet	-	1	1	-	9	-	11

== See also ==
- List of Boeing 777 orders and deliveries
- List of Boeing 747 operators
- List of Airbus A350 operators
- List of Airbus A380 operators

== Bibliography ==
- Birtles, Philip (1998). Boeing 777, Jetliner for a New Century. St. Paul, Minnesota: Motorbooks International. ISBN 0-7603-0581-1.
- Eden, Paul, ed. (2008). Civil Aircraft Today: The World's Most Successful Commercial Aircraft. London: Amber Books Ltd. ISBN 978-1-84509-324-2.
- Norris, Guy; Mark Wagner (1999). Modern Boeing Jetliners. Minneapolis, Minnesota: Zenith Imprint. ISBN 0-7603-0717-2.
