= List of Airbus A350 operators =

The following is a list of current commercial operators of the Airbus A350.

== Airline operators ==
There were 632 A350 aircraft in service with 44 operators as of March 20, 2025. The top 10 largest operators are Singapore Airlines (65), Qatar Airways (58), Cathay Pacific (48), Air France (41), Delta Air Lines (37), Air China (30), Lufthansa (30), Turkish Airlines (25), Japan Airlines (24) and Ethiopian Airlines (23).

Legend	Notes
*	Current
*	Former
	Orders

Airline	Country/Territory	Photo	900	900ULR	1000	1000ULR	1000F	Total in fleet	Notes
Aeroflot	Russia		7					7	No longer supported by Airbus as an effect of the Russian invasion of Ukraine.
Aerolíneas Estelar	Venezuela		1					1	Leased from Iberojet.
Aircalin	New Caledonia		2						Deliveries to begin by the end of 2026
Air Canada	Canada				8				Deliveries to begin in 2030
Air Caraïbes Atlantique	Guadeloupe		3		4			7	First operator in France.
Air China	China		30					30	
Air Europa	Spain		40						Deliveries to begin in 2028
Air France	France		41				4	41	
Air India	India		6		25			6	14 A350-1000 orders were converted into A350-900, deliveries and introduction to service began in 2024. 10 more were ordered in mid-2024
Air Mauritius	Mauritius		4					4	3 more to be delivered between 2025 and 2026.
Asiana Airlines	South Korea		15					15	
Atlas Air	United States						20		To be delivered between 2029 and 2034
Azul Brazilian Airlines	Brazil	Azul-a350-poa	2						Replaced by the Airbus A330neo.
British Airways	United Kingdom				18			18	
Cathay Pacific	Hong Kong		30		18		8	48	A350F deliveires to start from 2027.
China Airlines	Taiwan		15		10			15	A350-1000 to be delivered from 2029.
China Eastern Airlines	China		20					20	
China Southern Airlines	China		20					20	
CMA CGM Air Cargo	France						8		Deliveries to begin in 2027
Corendon Dutch Airlines	Netherlands		1					1	Leased from World2Fly.
Delta Air Lines	United States		37		20			37	First operator in North America. A350-1000 deliveries due to begin in early 2027.
Edelweiss Air	Switzerland	An Edelweiss Air Airbus A350	3					3	Deliveries began in April 2025. Total of 6 aircraft expected by 2027.
Egyptair	Egypt		4						One delivered in early 2026.
Emirates	United Arab Emirates		16					16	
Ethiopian Airlines	Ethiopia		20		3			22	A350-1000 orders were converted from A350-900. First operator in Africa.
Etihad Airways	United Arab Emirates				6		10	6	
Evelop Airlines	Spain		2						Renamed to Iberojet in 2021.
EVA Air	Taiwan				18				To be delivered between 2026 and 2030.
Fiji Airways	Fiji		4					4	First operator in the South Pacific.
Finnair	Finland		17					17	First operator in Europe.
French Bee	France		4		2			6	
Hainan Airlines	China		9						
Hong Kong Airlines	Hong Kong		9						
Iberia	Spain		22					22	
Iberojet	Spain		2					2	
ITA Airways	Italy		6					6	
IndiGo	India		60						To be delivered by 2027, additional 30 ordered and purchase rights of 40.
Japan Airlines	Japan		15		10			25	1 of 16 A350-900 (JA13XJ) written off after a collision with another aircraft at Tokyo Haneda Airport.
KLM	Netherlands		39		11				To be delivered to 2026. A350-900s to be shared with Air France.
Korean Air	South Korea		2		27			2	Deliveries began in late December 2024.
Kuwait Airways	Kuwait		2						
LATAM Brasil	Brazil		13						Retired early due to the COVID-19 pandemic.
Libyan Airlines	Libya		6						
Lufthansa	Germany		30		15			30	15 A350-1000 on order; deliveries due to begin in October 2026.
Malaysia Airlines	Malaysia		7					7	
Martinair	Netherlands						4		To be delivered by 2026.
Philippine Airlines	Philippines		2		3			3	A350-1000 to be delivered from 2025 through 2027. First A350-1000 delivered in December 2025.
Qantas	Australia				12	12			A350-1000ULR to be delivered starting from April 2027. Further 12 A350-1000 to be delivered starting from 2028.
Qatar Airways	Qatar		34		24			58	Launch customer of the A350-900 and A350-1000. Largest A350-1000 operator.
Really Cool Airlines	Thailand		4						
Riyadh Air	Saudi Arabia				25				
Scandinavian Airlines	Sweden; Norway; Denmark		4					4	
Sichuan Airlines	China		9					9	
Silk Way West Airlines	Azerbaijan						2		To be delivered by 2027.
Singapore Airlines	Singapore		58	7			7	65	Launch customer of the A350-900ULR and the A350F freighter. Largest A350 operator. Includes the 10000th Airbus aircraft ever built, 9V-SMF. Only airline operating the -900ULR variant.
South African Airways	South Africa		4						Leased from Air Mauritius and Avolon.
Starlux Airlines	Taiwan		10		2		10	12	18 A350-1000 ordered; 2 delivered
Swiss International Air Lines	Switzerland		2					2	Deliveries began in October 2025.
TAM Linhas Aéreas	Brazil		3						Rebranded to LATAM Brasil in 2016. First operator in the Americas.
Thai Airways International	Thailand		23					23	
Turkish Airlines	Turkey		25		15		5	25	
United Airlines	United States		45						To be delivered by 2030.
Vietnam Airlines	Vietnam		14					14	
Virgin Atlantic	United Kingdom				12			12	
World2Fly	Spain	A350-900 EC-NOI	3					3	
Yemenia	Yemen		10						
Total			790	7	310	12	106	669	

== See also ==
- List of Airbus A350 orders and deliveries
- List of Airbus A330 operators
- List of Airbus A380 operators
- List of Boeing 787 operators
- List of Boeing 777 operators
