= Japan Asia Airways =

Airline of Japan and Taiwan (1975–2008)

Japan Asia Airways, Co., Ltd. 日本アジア航空株式会社 Nihon Ajia Kōkū Kabushiki-gaisha
IATA	ICAO	Call sign
EG	JAA	ASIA
- Founded: 8 August 1975
- Ceased operations: 31 March 2008 (re-integrated into Japan Airlines)
- Focus cities: Nagoya–Centrair; Osaka–Kansai; Taipei–Taoyuan; Tokyo–Narita
- Alliance: Oneworld (affiliate; 2007–2008)
- Parent company: Japan Airlines Corp.
- Headquarters: Shinagawa, Tokyo, Japan

Japan Asia Airways (JAA) was a subsidiary of Japan Airlines (JAL) founded due to the legal status of the Republic of China (Taiwan) and territory disputes with the People's Republic of China in order to allow Japan Airlines to continue flying to Taiwan from Japan. JAA was headquartered in the Japan Airlines Building in Shinagawa, Tokyo.

JAA was established as a wholly owned subsidiary of JAL on 8 August 1975 and given the responsibility of providing air links between Japan and Taiwan, formerly offered by JAL.

Direct flights between Japan and Taiwan had been suspended since April 1975, following the signing of a civil air treaty with the People's Republic of China. However, following negotiations between the Interchange Association, Japan and Taiwan's Association of East Asian Relations, JAA was created and direct flights to Taipei were resumed. JAA began flights to Taipei on September 15, 1975.

Similar arrangements were later made by Air France, British Airways, KLM, Qantas and Swissair for their services to Taiwan.

In 1985, JAA was headquartered in the Yurakucho-Denki Building in Chiyoda, Tokyo, in a facility separate from the JAL headquarters in the Tokyo Building in Chiyoda.

Following JAL's privatization, the new 2007 Japan-Taiwan air transport agreement led JAL to liquidate JAA as a cost-saving measure and to normalize Japan-Taiwan flight status. JAA flew its last flights on March 31, 2008, and all flights were operated by JAL from April 1, 2008.

== Destinations ==
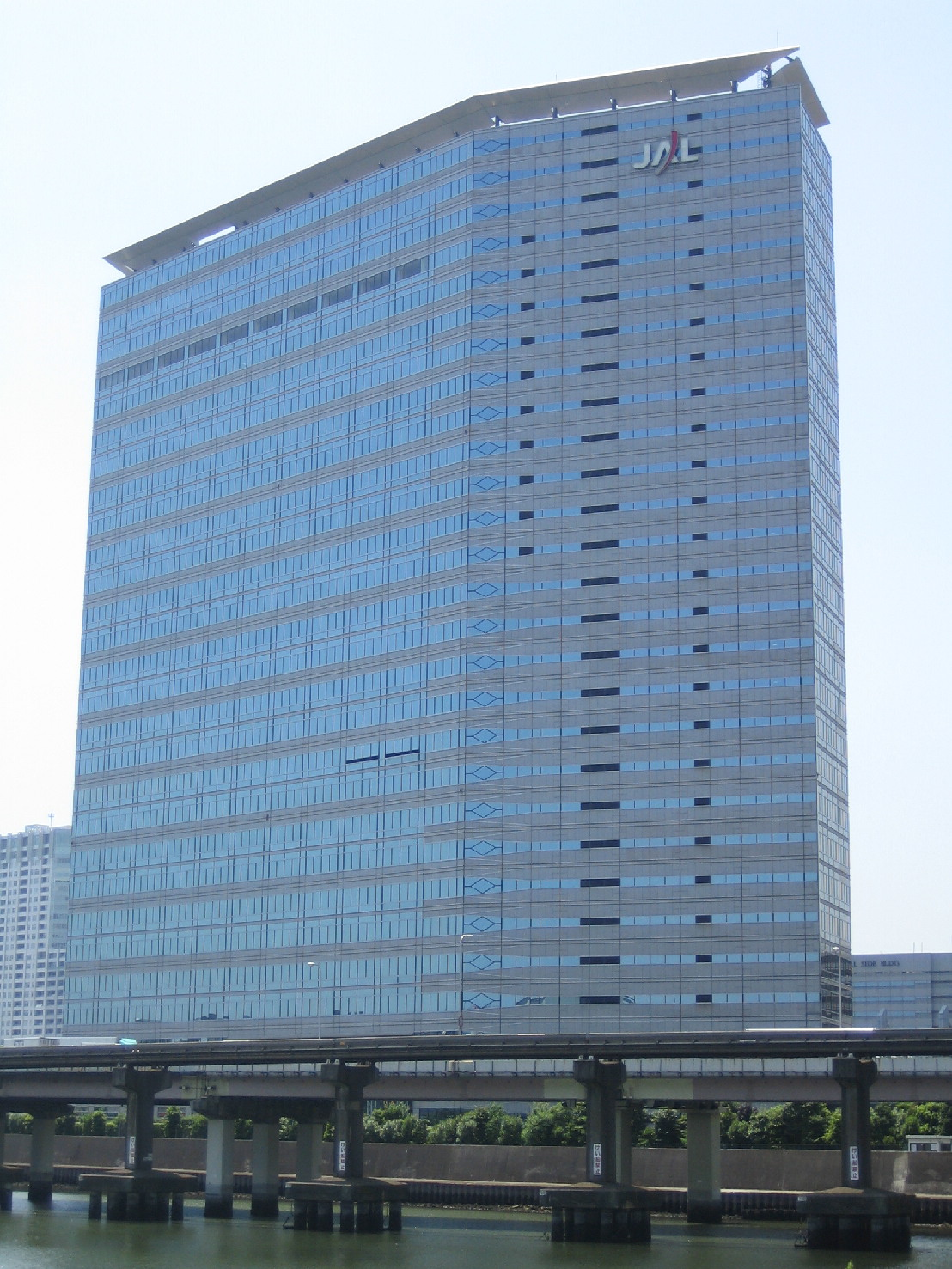
The Japan Airlines headquarters in Shinagawa included the JAA headquarters

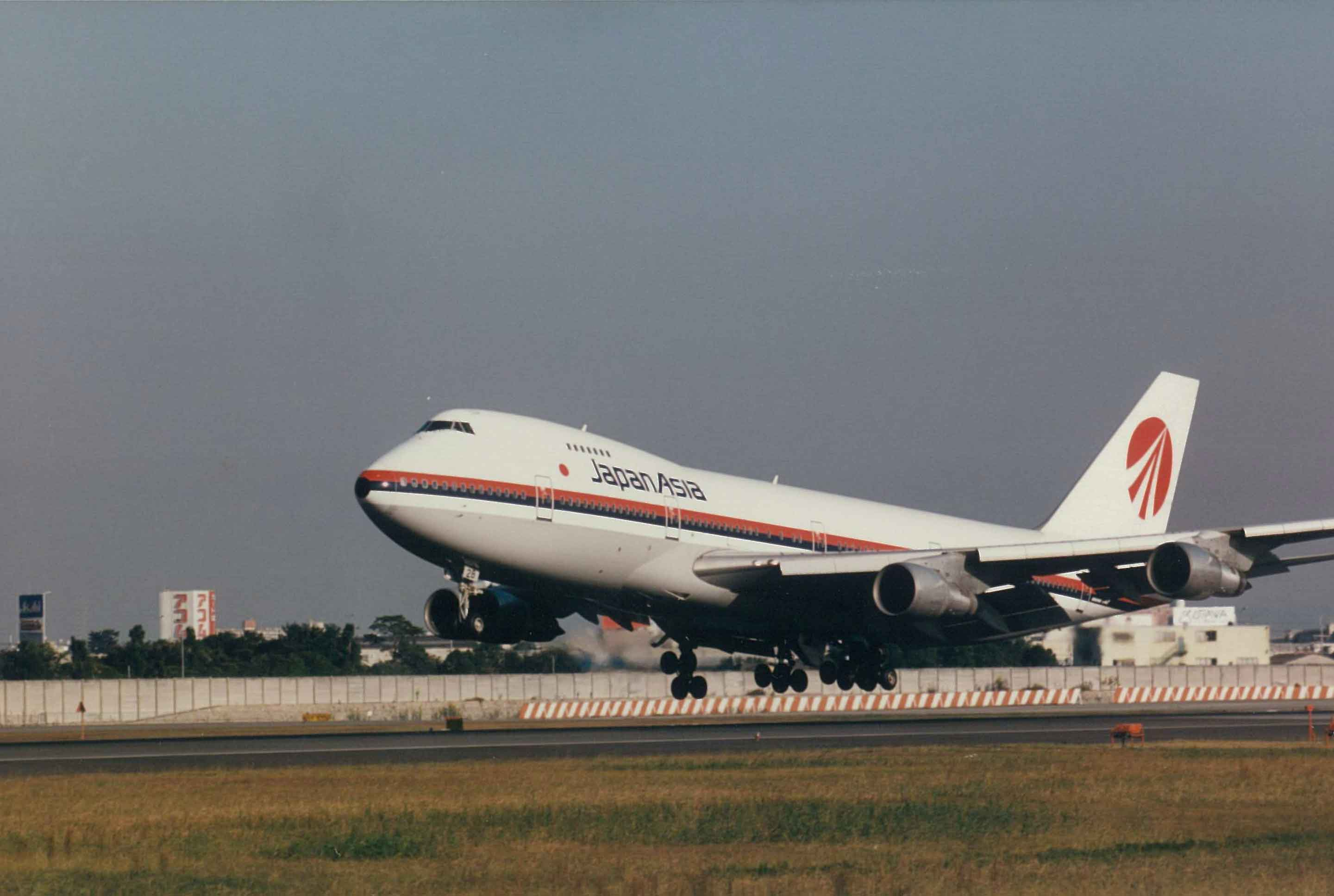
Japan Asia Airways Boeing 747-200 in original livery

Routes served by JAA before being folded into JAL:

- Taiwan Taoyuan International Airport — Narita International Airport
- Taiwan Taoyuan International Airport — Kansai International Airport
- Taiwan Taoyuan International Airport — Chubu Centrair International Airport
- Kaohsiung International Airport — Narita International Airport

The above routes were all taken over by JAL on 1 April 2008.

Historically, JAA even offered Taipei — Okinawa, Taipei — Hong Kong, and Taipei — Manila routes under the Fifth Freedom traffic rights granted by Taiwan, as well as the connection flights between Taipei and Kaohsiung before the direct Narita–Kaohsiung route was inaugurated in August 2005. JAA was to date the only international carrier to be granted the right to fly in-island by the Civil Aeronautics Administration (Republic of China).

== Fleet ==
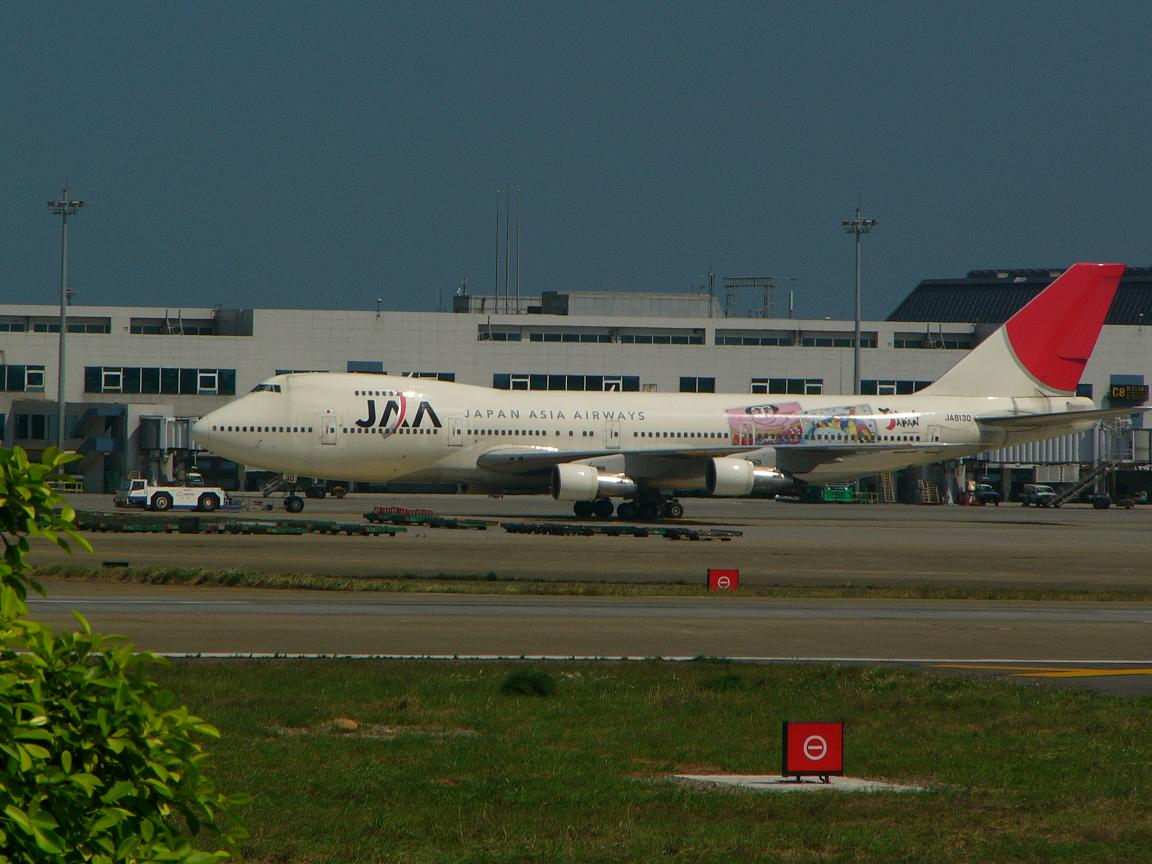
Japan Asia Airways Boeing 747-200 in final livery

The Japan Asia Airways fleet consisted of the following aircraft before its integration to Japan Airlines:

- Boeing 767-300
- Boeing 747-300
- Boeing 747-100
- Boeing 747-200
- McDonnell Douglas DC-8-62H
- McDonnell Douglas DC-10-40

Beginning in 2004, most JAA flights were operated with JAL Boeing 747-400 aircraft to meet market demand and to improve JAL fleet utilization. Previously, JAA operated Douglas DC-8-53/61, Boeing 747-100/200 and McDonnell Douglas DC-10-40 aircraft.

== See also ==
- Foreign relations of Taiwan § Air links
- British Asia Airways
- KLM Asia
- Australia Asia Airlines
- Swissair Asia
- Air France Asie
