= List of Madagascar Airlines destinations =

Madagascar Airlines was established as Madair on 1 January 1962 by Air France and the original 1947-formed Air Madagascar —subsidiary of Transports Aériens Intercontinentaux (TAI) at that time— when it took over the domestic routes operated by these two airlines. Air France and Air Madagascar initially had a 44% and 36% stake in Madair, respectively, while the Malagasy government held the balance. On 20 October 1961, intercontinental services were started, flying a weekly Tananarive–Djibouti–Nice–Paris service using a DC-7 leased from TAI.

Madair changed its name to Air Madagascar in 1963. That year, a regional service to the Comoro Islands was launched using DC-4 equipment. An agreement with Air France permitted the company to start Boeing 707 flights to Paris via Djibouti; they commenced in July 1964. Johannesburg was made part of the route network on 6 August 1967.

By March 1970, the carrier operated an extensive domestic network plus regional routes to the Comoro Islands, Johannesburg and Réunion Island and a weekly intercontinental 707 service to Paris via Djibouti and Marseille. Thirty years later, Dzaoudzi, Johannesburg, Mauritius, Moroni, Nairobi, Paris, Rome, Singapore and St. Denis de la Reunion comprised the international list of destinations, whereas Ambanja, Ambatomainty, Ambatondrazaka, Analalava, Ankavandra, Antalaha, Antsalova, Antsiranana, Antsohihy, Belo, Besalampy, Farafangana, Fianarantsoa, Fort Dauphin, Mahanoro, Maintirano, Majunga, Mampikony, Manakara, Mananara, Mananjary, Mandritsara, Manja, Maroansetra, Miandrivazo, Morafenobe, Morombe, Morondava, Nossi-Be, Port Berge, Sambava, Soalala, Ste Marie, Tamatave, Tambohorano, Tsaratanana, Tsiroanomandidy, Tulear, Vatomandry and Vohemar made up the domestic route network. Air Madagascar launched flights to Guangzhou on 6 July 2009.

== List ==
As of February 2025, Air Madagascar operates to the following destinations:

Country	City	Airport	Notes	Refs
China	Guangzhou	Guangzhou Baiyun International Airport	Terminated	
Comoros	Anjouan	Ouani Airport	Terminated	
Comoros	Moroni	Prince Said Ibrahim International Airport	Terminated	
Djibouti	Djibouti City	Djibouti–Ambouli International Airport	Terminated	
France	Marseille	Marseille Provence Airport	Terminated	
France	Nice	Nice Côte d'Azur Airport	Terminated	
France	Paris	Charles de Gaulle Airport	Terminated	
Germany	Munich	Munich Airport	Terminated	
Italy	Milan	Milan Malpensa Airport	Terminated	
Italy	Rome	Rome Fiumicino Airport	Terminated	
Kenya	Nairobi	Jomo Kenyatta International Airport	Terminated	
Madagascar	Ambanja	Ambanja Airport	Terminated	
Madagascar	Ambatomainty	Ambatomainty Airport	Terminated	
Madagascar	Ambatondrazaka	Ambatondrazaka Airport	Terminated	
Madagascar	Ambilobe	Ambilobe Airport	Terminated	
Madagascar	Analalava	Analalava Airport	Terminated	
Madagascar	Andriamena	Andriamena Airport	Terminated	
Madagascar	Ankavandra	Ankavandra Airport	Terminated	
Madagascar	Antalaha	Antsirabato Airport	Terminated	
Madagascar	Antananarivo	Ivato International Airport	Hub	
Madagascar	Antsalova	Antsalova Airport	Terminated	
Madagascar	Antsiranana	Arrachart Airport		
Madagascar	Antsohihy	Ambalabe Airport	Terminated	
Madagascar	Belo sur Tsiribihina	Belo sur Tsiribihina Airport	Terminated	
Madagascar	Besalampy	Besalampy Airport	Terminated	
Madagascar	Boriziny	Port Bergé Airport	Terminated	
Madagascar	Farafangana	Farafangana Airport	Terminated	
Madagascar	Fianarantsoa	Fianarantsoa Airport	Terminated	
Madagascar	Mahajanga	Amborovy Airport		
Madagascar	Maintirano	Maintirano Airport	Terminated	
Madagascar	Mampikony	Mampikony Airport	Terminated	
Madagascar	Manakara	Manakara Airport	Terminated	
Madagascar	Mananjary	Mananjary Airport	Terminated	
Madagascar	Mandritsara	Mandritsara Airport	Terminated	
Madagascar	Manja	Manja Airport	Terminated	
Madagascar	Maroantsetra	Maroantsetra Airport		
Madagascar	Miandrivazo	Miandrivazo Airport	Terminated	
Madagascar	Morafenobe	Morafenobe Airport	Terminated	
Madagascar	Morombe	Morombe Airport	Terminated	
Madagascar	Morondava	Morondava Airport		
Madagascar	Nosy Be	Fascene Airport		
Madagascar	Sainte-Marie	Sainte Marie Airport		
Madagascar	Sambava	Sambava Airport		
Madagascar	Soalala	Soalala Airport	Terminated	
Madagascar	Tambohorano	Tambohorano Airport	Terminated	
Madagascar	Tolagnaro	Tôlanaro Airport		
Madagascar	Toamasina	Toamasina Airport		
Madagascar	Toliara	Toliara Airport		
Madagascar	Tsaratanana	Tsaratanana Airport	Terminated	
Madagascar	Tsiroanomandidy	Tsiroanomandidy Airport	Terminated	
Madagascar	Vatomandry	Vatomandry Airport	Terminated	
Madagascar	Vohemar	Vohemar Airport	Terminated	
Mauritius	Port Louis	Sir Seewoosagur Ramgoolam International Airport	Terminated	
Mayotte	Dzaoudzi	Dzaoudzi–Pamandzi International Airport	Terminated	
Réunion	Saint-Denis	Roland Garros Airport	Terminated	
Seychelles	Mahé	Seychelles International Airport	Terminated	
Singapore	Singapore	Changi Airport	Terminated	
South Africa	Johannesburg	O. R. Tambo International Airport	Terminated	
Switzerland	Zürich	Zurich Airport	Terminated	
Thailand	Bangkok	Suvarnabhumi Airport	Terminated	

== See also ==
- Transport in Madagascar

== Bibliography ==
- Guttery, Ben R. (1998). Encyclopedia of African Airlines. Jefferson, North Carolina: McFarland & Company, Inc. ISBN 0-7864-0495-7.
