= Arrachart Airport =

Airport in Madagascar

- IATA: DIE; ICAO: FMNA

Summary
- Airport type: Public
- Operator: Government
- Serves: Antsiranana, Madagascar
- Elevation AMSL: 374 ft / 114 m
- Coordinates: 12°20′57″S 049°17′30″E

Map
- Location within Madagascar

Runways
Direction	Length		Surface
Direction	m	ft	Surface
13/31	1,500	4,921	Asphalt
- Source: DAFIF

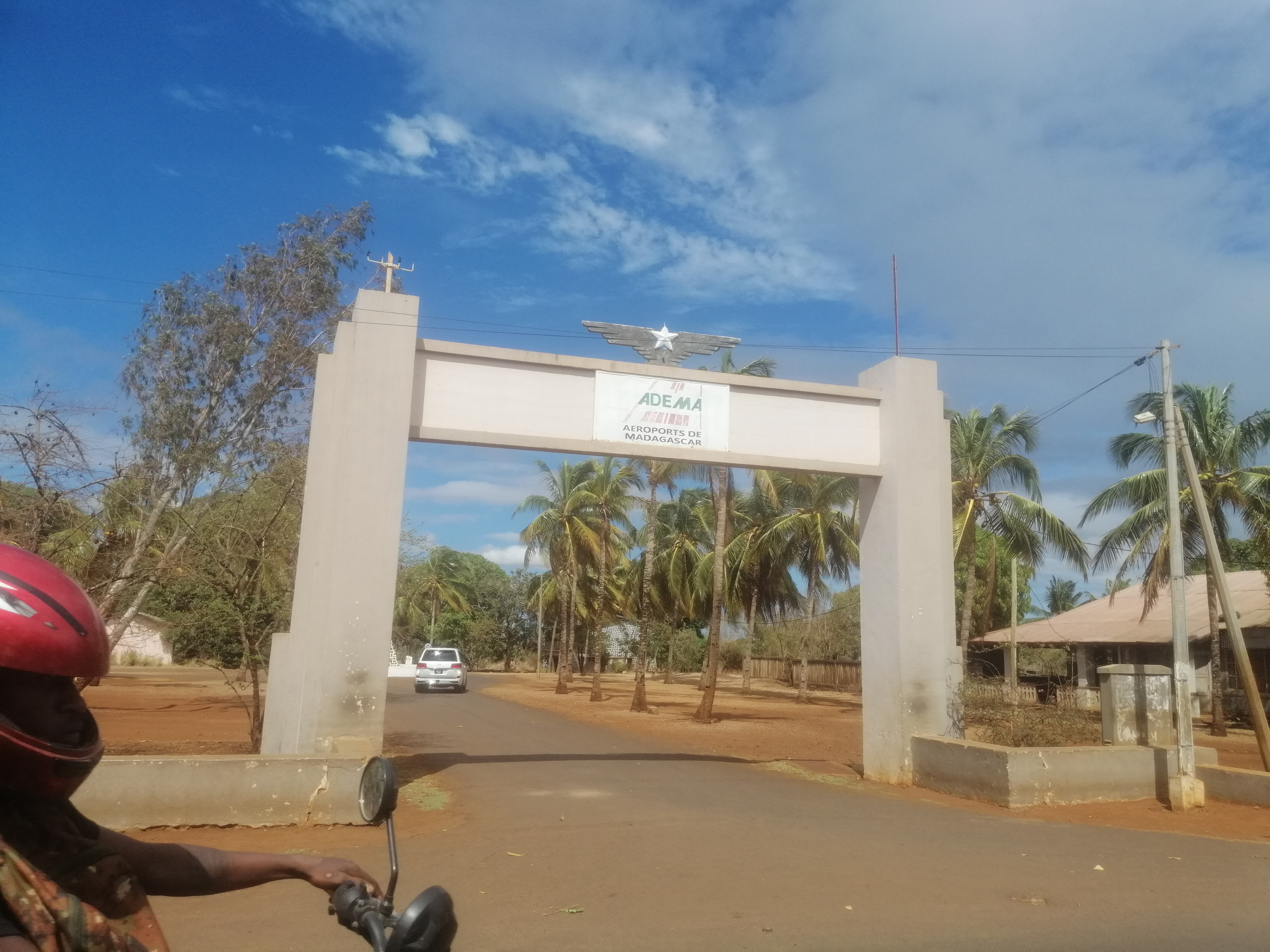
Entrance to Arrachart airport

Arrachart Airport (IATA: DIE, ICAO: FMNA) is an airport located near Antsiranana (formerly Diego-Suárez) in Madagascar.

Created before the Second World War as Camp Arrachart, a French military and civilian air facility, the airport was named after Ludovic Arrachart, a French aviator and pioneer of intercontinental flying, who made one of the first postal flights between France and Madagascar and died in an accident in 1933. The French air force (Armée de l'air) left in 1973.

== Airlines and destinations ==
Airlines	Destinations
Air Austral	Saint-Denis de la Réunion
Ewa Air	Dzaoudzi
Madagascar Airlines	Antananarivo, Nosy-Be, Sambava
