= Air Austral =

National airline of Réunion

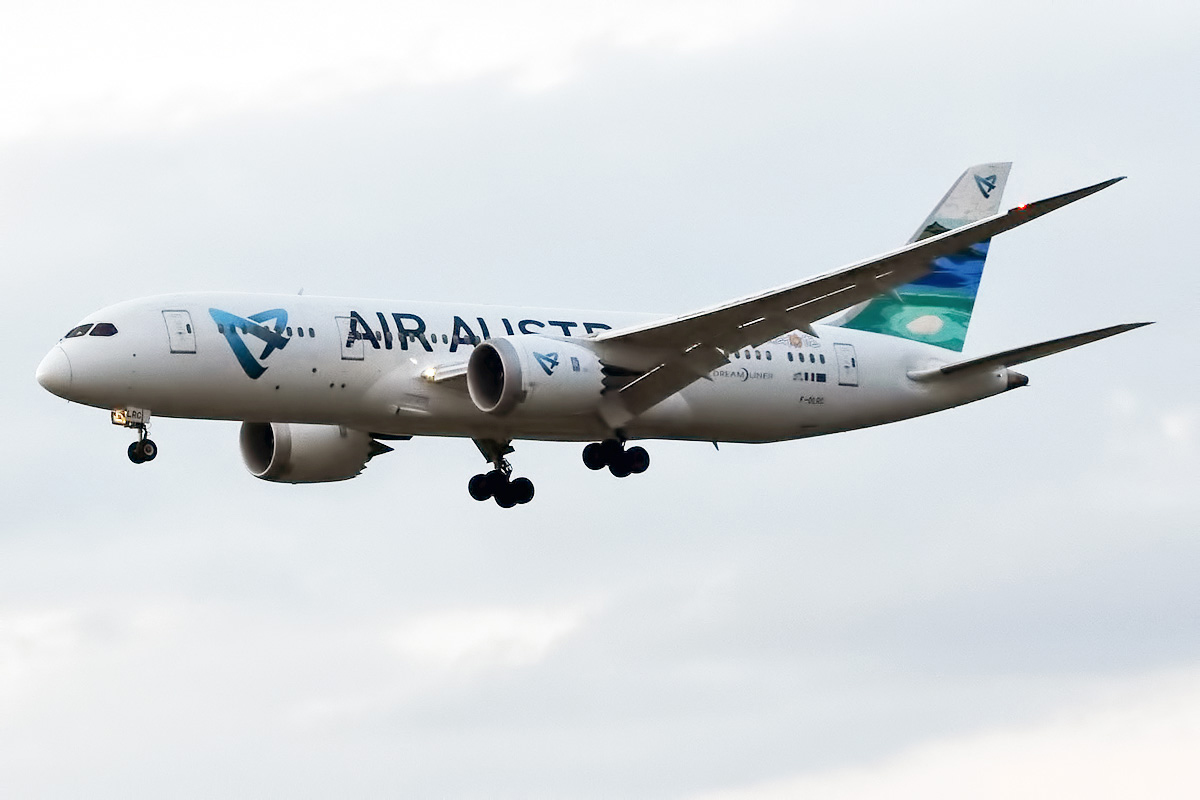
- Air Austral Boeing 787-8
IATA	ICAO	Call sign
UU	REU	REUNION
- Founded: December 1974; 51 years ago
- Hubs: Saint-Denis de la Réunion
- Focus cities: Dzaoudzi
- Frequent-flyer program: Capricorn
- Alliance: Vanilla Alliance
- Subsidiaries: Ewa Air
- Fleet size: 8
- Destinations: 17
- Headquarters: Roland Garros Airport, Sainte-Marie, Réunion
- Key people: Joseph Bréma (CEO)
- Founder: Gerard Etheve
- Website: www.air-austral.com

Air Austral is a French airline that is also the flag carrier of the overseas department and region of Réunion. The airline is based at Roland Garros Airport. It operates scheduled services from Réunion to metropolitan France, South Africa, Thailand and a number of destinations in the Indian Ocean. The company has eight airplanes in the fleet and employs around 900 people.

== History ==
Air Austral's former logo, used until 2014

=== 1974–1990: Founding years as RAS and Air Réunion ===
Air Austral was created in December 1974 by local businessman Gérard Ethève as Réunion Air Services (RAS), Réunion's first commercial airline. By August 1977, RAS had started regional services from Sainte-Marie to Mayotte with a 32-seat Hawker Siddeley HS 748 turboprop. RAS became Air Réunion in December 1986.

In October 1990, Sematra, a company 46% owned by the local councils of Réunion with the remaining shares owned by banks and other private partners, purchased Air Réunion.

=== 1990–2011: Development as Air Austral and growth in operations ===
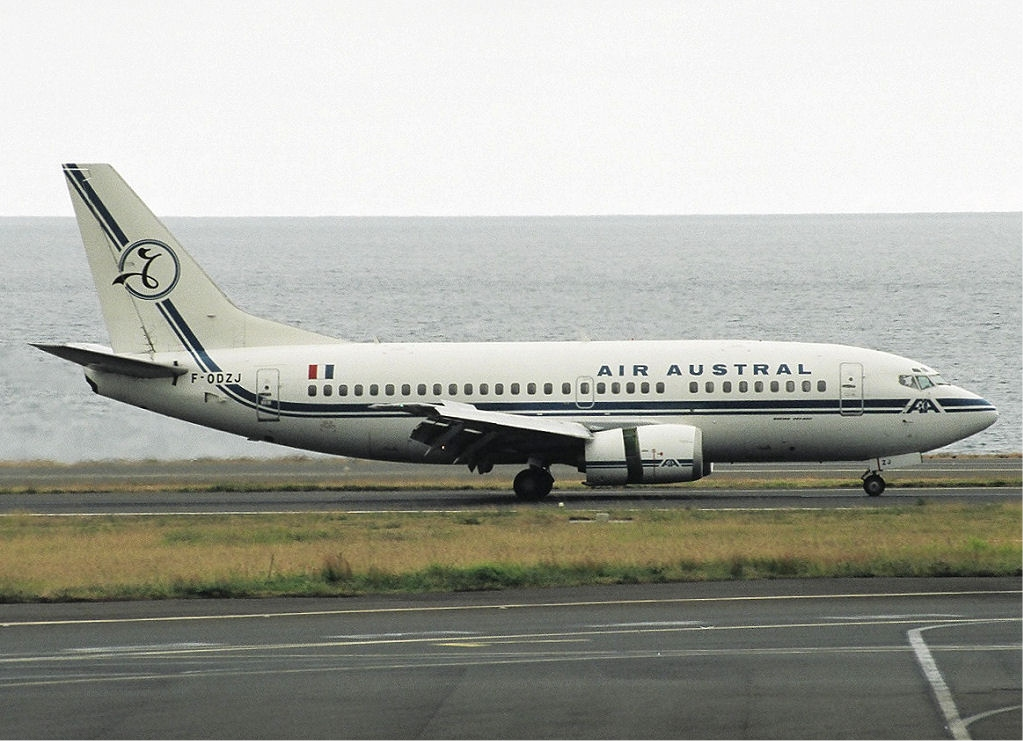
Former Air Austral Boeing 737-500 at Roland Garros Airport

In November 1990, Air Réunion became Air Austral. Two months later, Air Austral bought its first Boeing 737-500. Another 737-300 was acquired in 1994, and in 1997, the airline purchased a 737-300QC, which enabled both passenger and cargo only traffic.

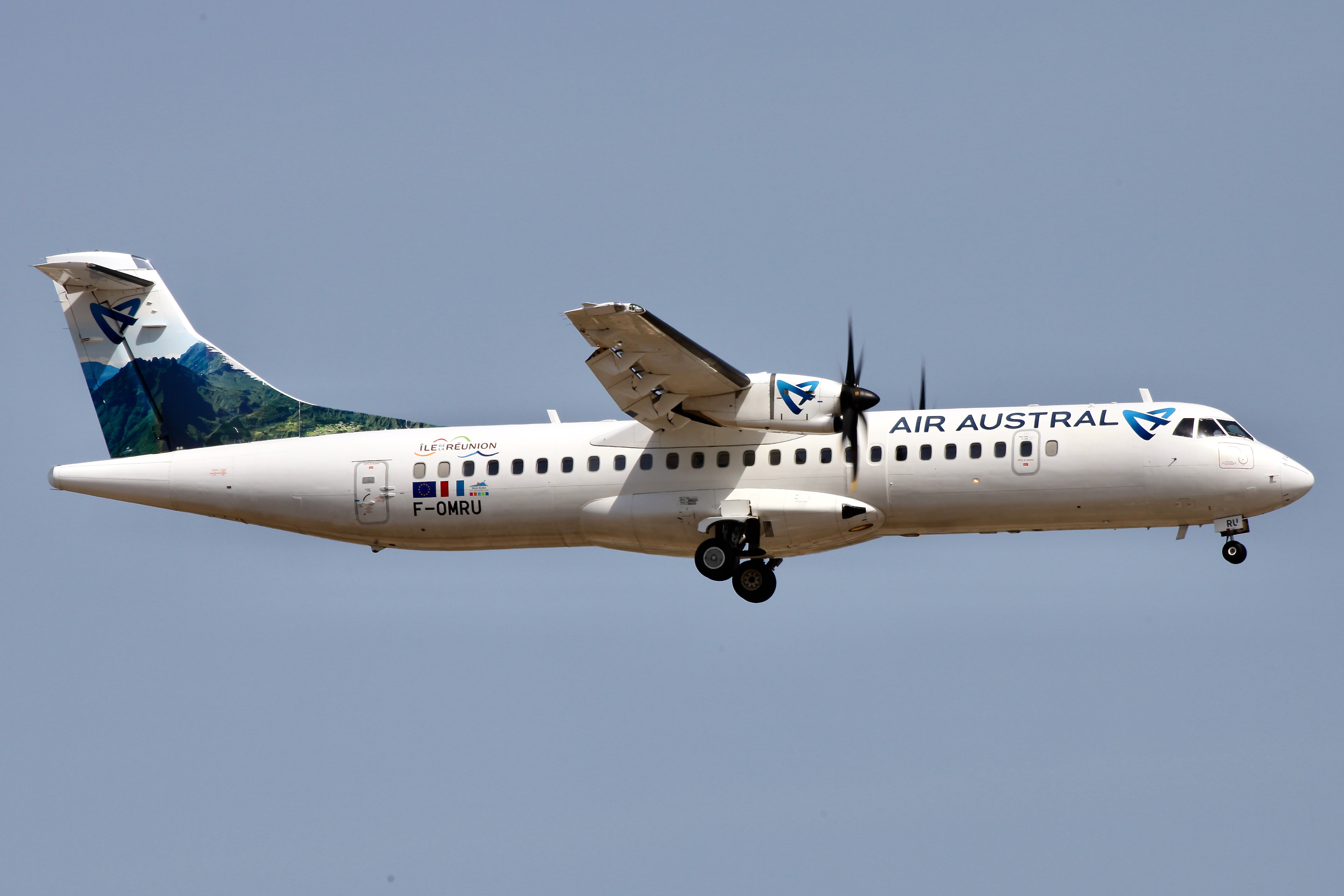
Former Air Austral ATR 72-500

In 2000, the airline took delivery of an ATR 72-500 short-haul turboprop. By then, Air Austral operated from both Roland Garros Airport in Sainte-Marie and Pierrefonds Airport in Saint-Pierre, with scheduled services to Mayotte, South Africa (Johannesburg), Comoros, Mauritius, the Seychelles, and four destinations in Madagascar (Antananarivo, Tamatave, Nosy Be, Majunga). In 2003, Air Austral launched its first long-haul service between Réunion and Paris, with two Boeing 777-200ERs. The two Boeing 777s were joined by a third Boeing 777-200ER in 2005. A second long-haul route from Réunion to Marseille and Lyon was established.

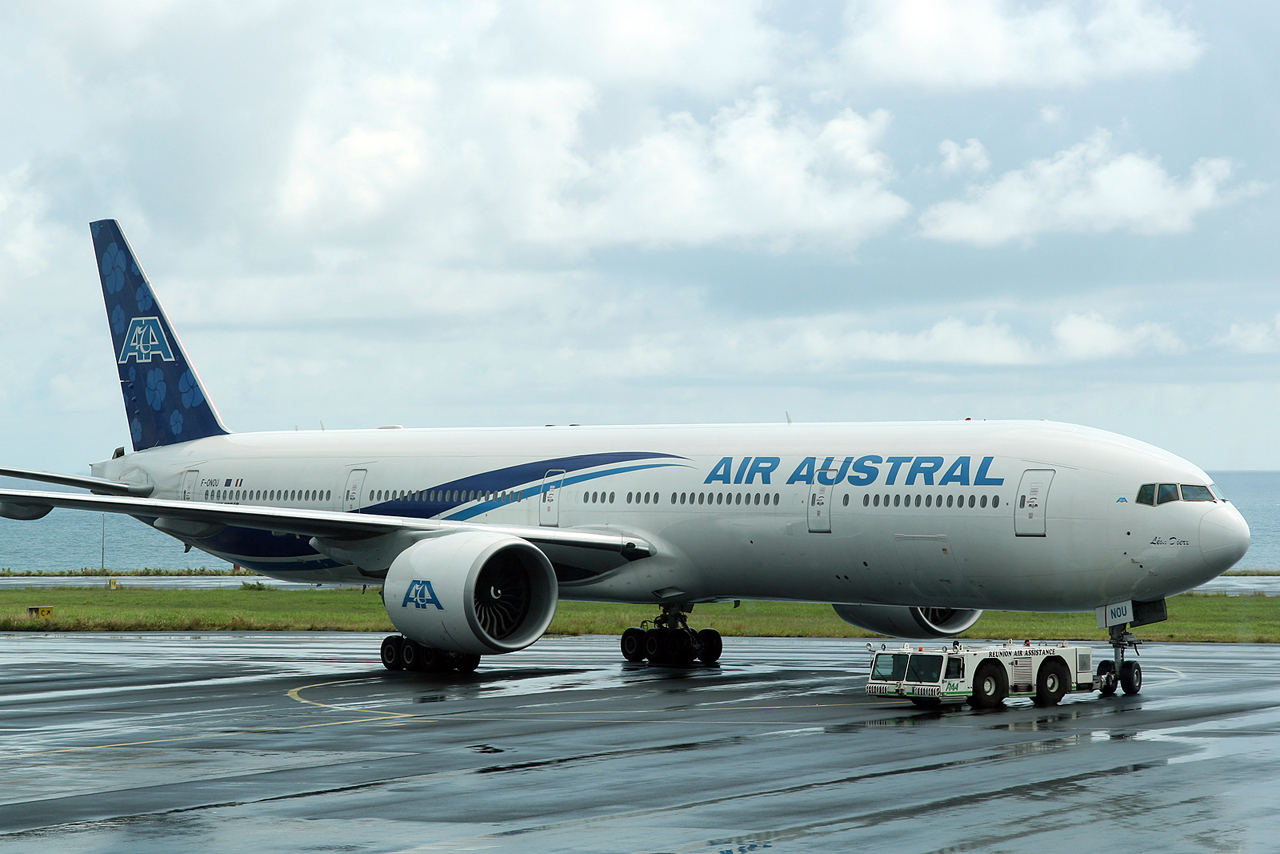
Former Air Austral Boeing 777-300ER at Roland Garros Airport

In 2007, a third long-haul service to Toulouse via Marseille started. In 2008, the airline introduced new uniforms for staff and crew members, designed by Balenciaga. A second ATR 72-500 was added to the fleet, followed by a third a few months later. In April 2009, Air Austral started a new service to Sydney and New Caledonia, thus opening up a new route between Paris and Sydney via Réunion. The airline also acquired two Boeing 777-300ERs. In November, it placed a firm order for two all-economy class 840-seat Airbus A380s, for delivery in 2014. These were intended for Air Austral's Réunion-Paris flights. In June 2010, Air Austral announced it would start scheduled flights from Réunion to Bordeaux and Nantes from February 2011. In August 2011, Air Austral received its first Boeing 777-200LR.

=== 2012–present: Economic struggles and subsequent rebound ===
In April 2012, founder and chief executive Gérard Ethève was replaced by Marie-Joseph Malé following financial difficulties caused by risky business decisions and made worse by high fuel prices. Non-profitable routes to Nouméa, Sydney, Marseille, Bordeaux, Nantes, Toulouse, and Lyon were closed. Additionally, Air Austral was unable to pay for a new 777-200LR awaiting delivery and looked to sell the plane instead of taking delivery. Following this development, Air Austral announced in May 2012 that it would defer or cancel its order for two Airbus A380s, with a decision to be made by the end of June 2012.

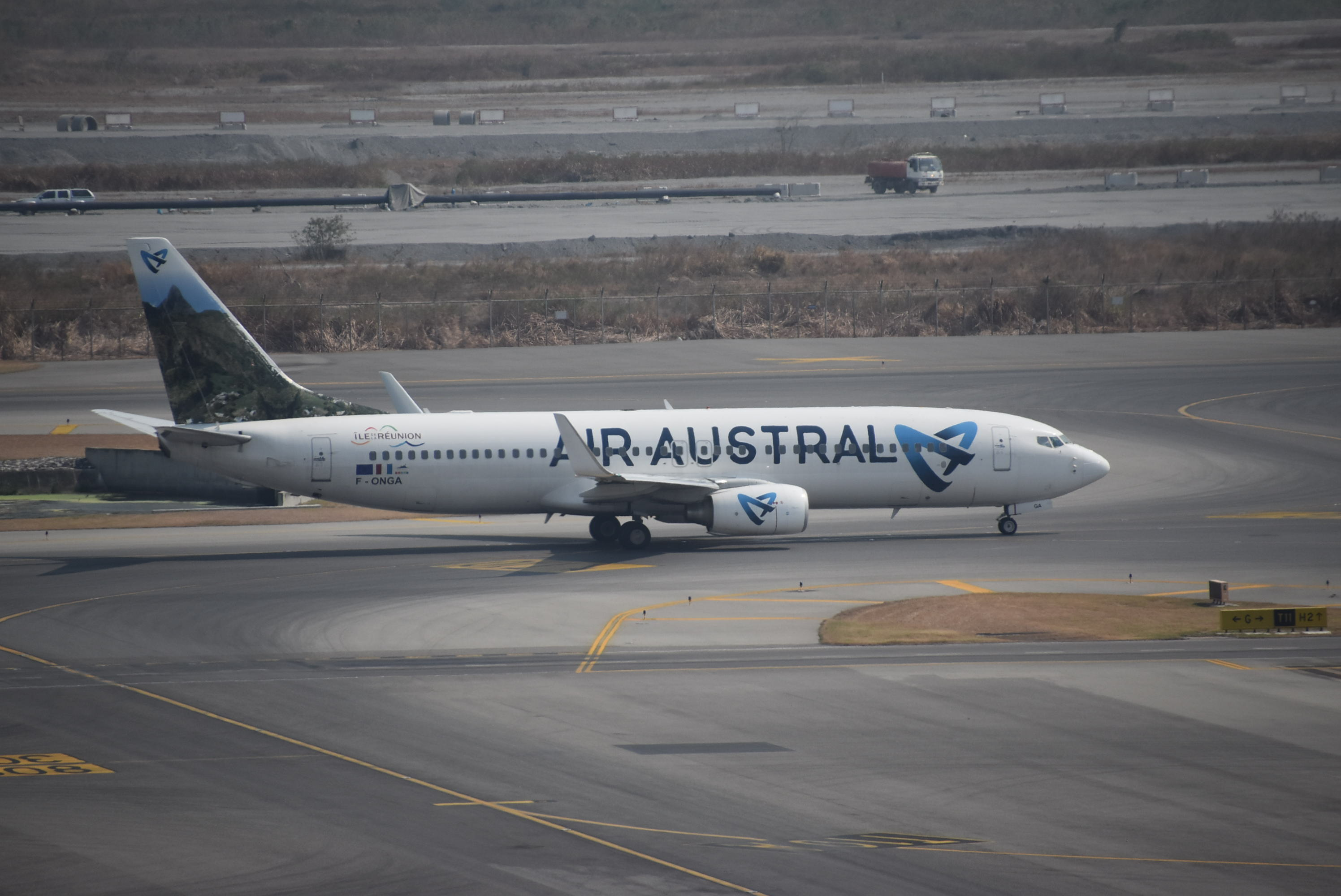
Former Air Austral Boeing 737-800 at Suvarnabhumi Airport

In June 2013, Air Austral introduced direct flights to Chennai, India with its new Boeing 737-800s. In February 2015, the company announced an order for two Boeing 787-8s, to be delivered in May and October 2016 respectively. In March 2015, it also announced the lease of 2 more B777-300ER from Air Lease Corporation (ALC). These aircraft, delivered in late 2016, replaced the oldest two models of the same type then operated by Air Austral.

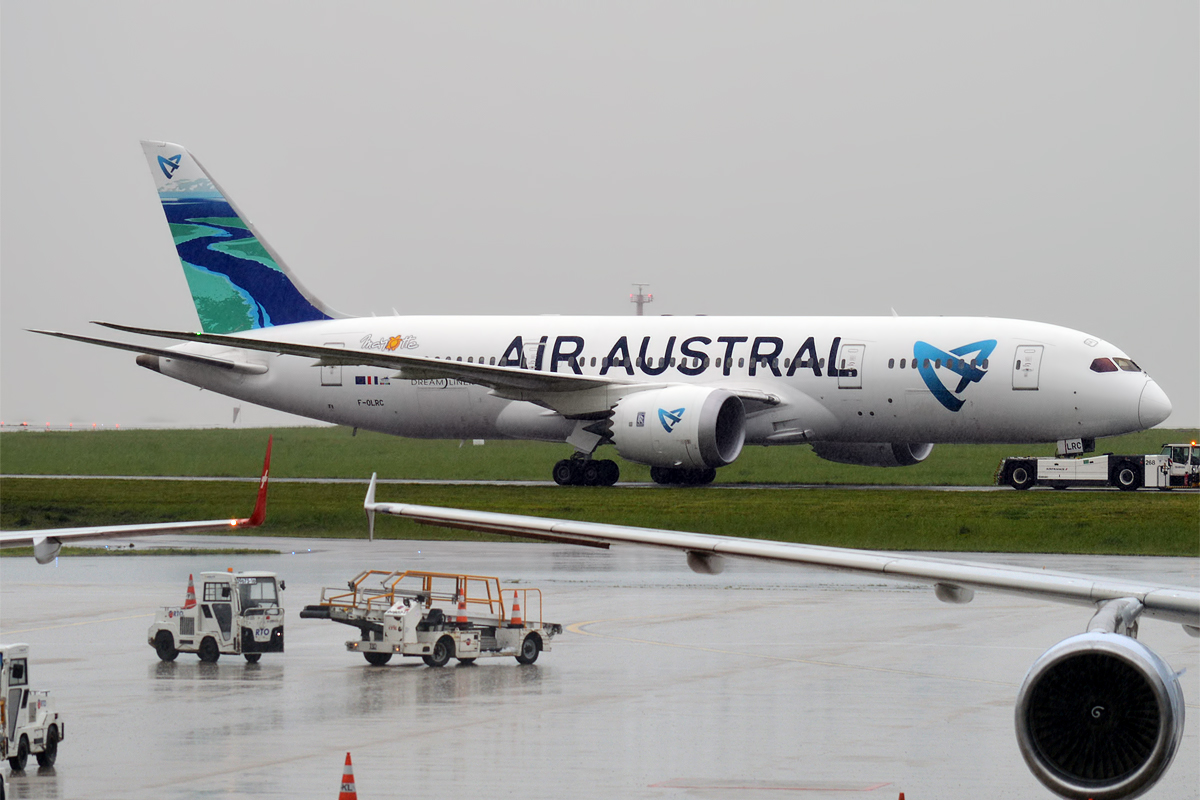
Air Austral Boeing 787-8 Dreamliner at Charles de Gaulle Airport

In November 2015, the company sold its single Boeing 777-200LR to Florida-based broker Atlas Aviation, which became the "Crystal Skye" ultraluxury air cruise aircraft. Air Austral simultaneously announced the lease, from November 2015 to May 2016, of a Boeing 737-300QC (QC for quick change) from ASL Airlines France (formerly Europe Airpost). The plane involved was F-ODZZ, a convertible version of the 737–300 (a cabin that can be changed from passenger to freight configuration) that had already been in Air Austral service between 1997 and 2005. It was used until the first of two Boeing 787-8s ordered by the company was delivered in May 2016.

In October 2017, Air Austral signed a strategic partnership agreement with Air Madagascar to become the airline's minority shareholder, owning a 49% stake in the company, after the two companies established their relationship in 2016. The move was done in part to help Air Madagascar return to profitability and facilitate stronger connections within the regional market for the two airlines. In February 2018, Air Austral revealed its restructuring strategy for Air Madagascar through 2027, which included stabilising the company's finances, launching strategic routes, and expanding the company's fleet. In July 2018, Kenya Airways signed a memorandum of understanding to join the partnership in an effort to strengthen Nairobi's connections to Réunion and Madagascar and to also open up the possibilities of codesharing between the three carriers. The agreement was later finalized by the three airlines in December 2018. However, in November 2019, reports revealed that the partnership between Air Austral and Air Madagascar was at risk of dissolution after Air Austral did not contribute its second payment of €25 million for its equity share in the airline.

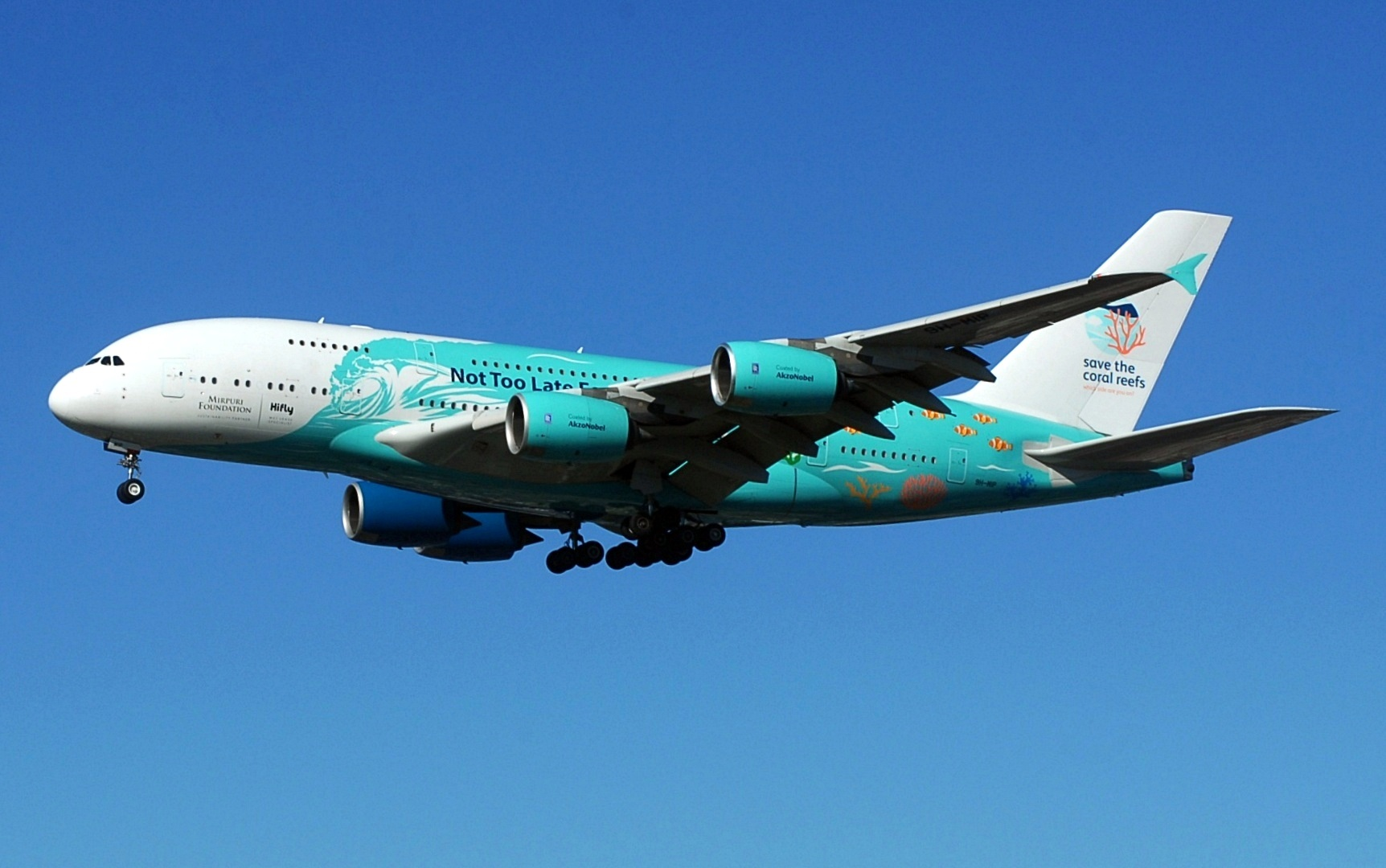
Hi Fly Malta A380-800 that Air Austral leased in 2018.

In August 2018, Air Austral began wet leasing an Airbus A380 from charter airline Hi Fly after it grounded one of its Boeing 787s due to inspections of the plane's Rolls-Royce Trent 1000 engines. In October 2019, Air Austral announced it was developing its plans to renew its fleet. That month, the airline signed a purchase agreement for three Airbus A220-300 aircraft that would replace its two Boeing 737-800 and ATR 72-500 aircraft. The airline projects it may begin renewing its long-haul fleet beginning in 2023.

== Destinations ==
This is a list of destinations served and previously served by Air Austral as of October 2022:

Country or territory	City	Airport	Notes	Refs
Australia	Sydney	Sydney Airport	Terminated	
Comoros	Moroni	Prince Said Ibrahim International Airport		
France	Bordeaux	Bordeaux–Mérignac Airport	Terminated	
France	Lyon	Lyon–Saint-Exupéry Airport	Terminated	
France	Marseille	Marseille Provence Airport	Terminated	
France	Nantes	Nantes Atlantique Airport	Terminated	
France	Paris	Charles de Gaulle Airport		
France	Toulouse	Toulouse–Blagnac Airport	Terminated	
India	Chennai	Chennai International Airport	Terminated	
Madagascar	Antananarivo	Ivato Airport		
Madagascar	Antsiranana	Arrachart Airport	Seasonal; Ewa Air planes used	
Madagascar	Fort-Dauphin	Tôlanaro Airport	Terminated	
Madagascar	Nosy Be	Fascene Airport		
Madagascar	Toamasina	Toamasina Airport	Seasonal; Ewa Air planes used	
Madagascar	Tuléar	Toliara Airport	Terminated	
Mauritius	Port Louis	Sir Seewoosagur Ramgoolam International Airport		
Mauritius	Rodrigues	Sir Gaëtan Duval Airport	Seasonal; Ewa Air planes used	
Mayotte	Dzaoudzi	Dzaoudzi Pamandzi International Airport	Focus city	
New Caledonia	Nouméa	La Tontouta International Airport	Terminated	
Réunion	Saint-Denis	Roland Garros Airport	Hub	
Réunion	Saint-Pierre	Pierrefonds Airport	Focus city	
Seychelles	Mahé	Seychelles International Airport	Terminated	
South Africa	Johannesburg	O. R. Tambo International Airport		
Thailand	Bangkok	Suvarnabhumi Airport		

=== Interline agreements ===
Air Austral has interlining agreements with:

- French Bee
- Swiss International Air Lines
- Thai Airways International

=== Codeshare agreements ===
Air Austral has codeshare agreements with the following airlines:

- Air France
- Air Madagascar
- Air India
- Air Mauritius
- Ewa Air
- Kenya Airways

== Fleet ==
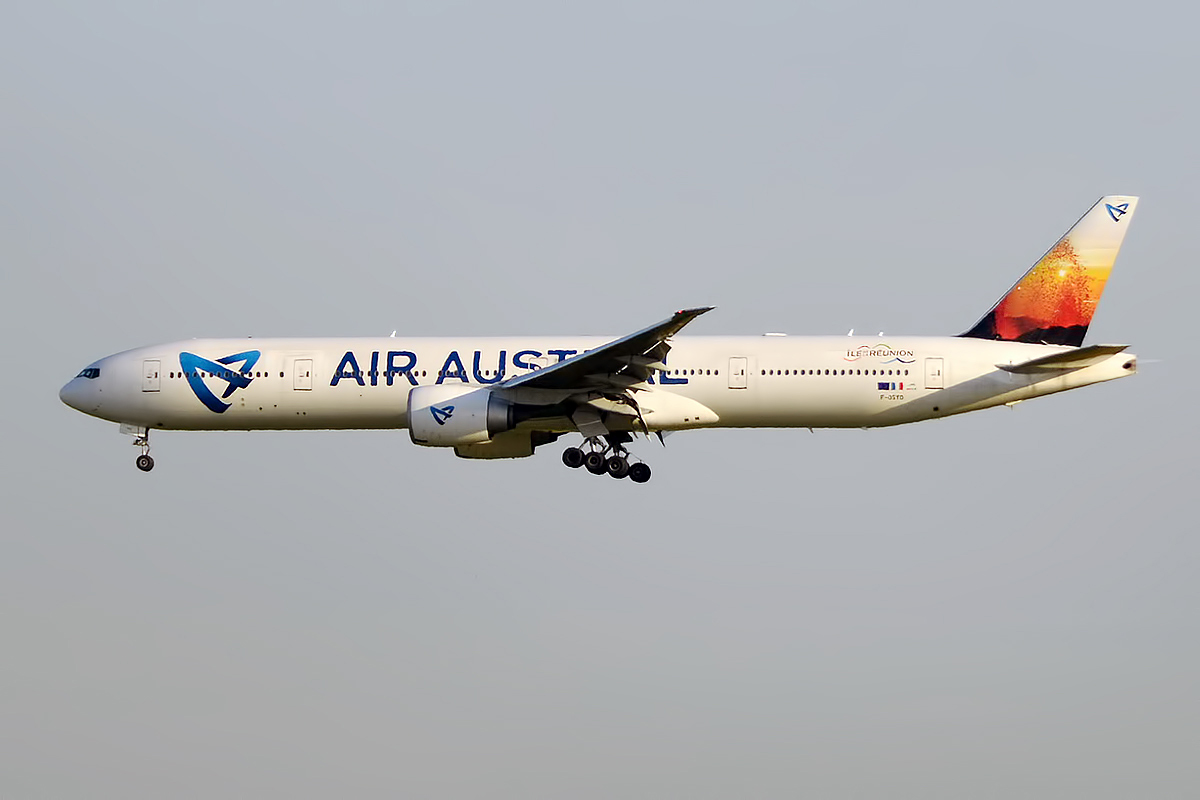
Air Austral Boeing 777-300ER

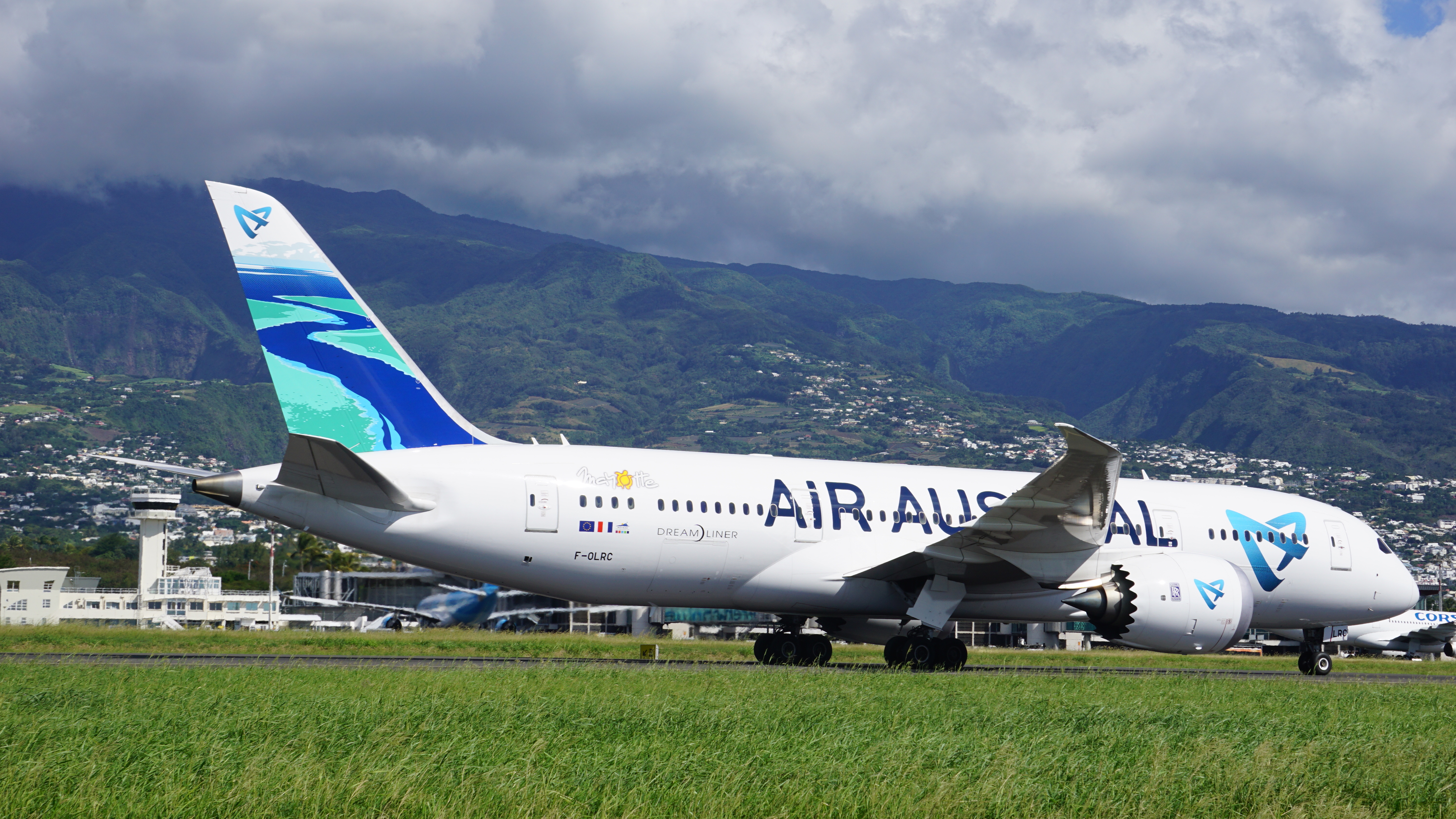
Air Austral Boeing 787-8

=== Current fleet ===
As of August 2025, Air Austral operates the following aircraft:

Air Austral fleet
Aircraft	In service	Orders	Passengers				Notes
Aircraft	In service	Orders	J	W	Y	Total	Notes
Airbus A220-300	3	—	—	12	120	132	F-OLAV stored, waiting for a new company. To be retired.
Airbus A320neo	—	2	—	—	180	180	To replace Airbus A220s. Deliveries starting in 2027.
Airbus A320neo	—	2	—	20	150	170	To replace Airbus A220s. Deliveries starting in 2027.
Boeing 777-300ER	3	—	14	40	384	438	
Boeing 787-8	2	—	18	—	244	262	
Total	8	2					

=== Former fleet ===
Air Austral fleet
Aircraft	Total	Introduced	Retired	Notes
ATR 72-500	3	2000	2022	
Boeing 737-500	1	1990	2011	
Boeing 737-300	1	1994	2011	
Boeing 737-300QC	2	1997	2016	
Boeing 737-800	2	2010	2023	
Airbus A330-200	2	2018	2018	Leased from Hi Fly
Airbus A330-200	1	2019	2019	Leased from Wamos Air
Fokker F28 Fellowship	1	1989	1995	
Boeing 777-200ER	3	2003	2017	
Boeing 767-300ER	1	2009	2009	
Boeing 777-300ER	2	2013	2017	
Boeing 777-200LR	1	2011	2015	
