= Ewa Air =

French airline based in Pamandzi, Mayotte

IATA	ICAO	Call sign
ZD	EWR	MAYOTTE AIR
- Commenced operations: 2013; 13 years ago
- Hubs: Dzaoudzi–Pamandzi International Airport
- Fleet size: 2
- Destinations: 8
- Parent company: Air Austral (52.3%)
- Headquarters: Pamandzi, Mayotte, France
- Website: www.ewa-air.com/en

Ewa Air is a French airline with its corporate head office on the property of Dzaoudzi–Pamandzi International Airport in Pamandzi, Mayotte, near Dzaoudzi. The airline began operations in 2013.

== Corporate affairs ==
It commenced operations with a capital sum of €4.4 million.

=== Shareholders ===
Name	Interest
Air Austral	52.3%
Mayotte Chamber of Commerce	22.7%
Ylang Invest	25.0%

== Destinations ==
As of July 2026, Ewa Air serves eight destinations in the Indian Ocean and Africa.

Country	City	Airport	Notes	Ref
Comoros	Anjouan	Ouani Airport	Suspended	
Comoros	Moroni	Prince Said Ibrahim International Airport		
Madagascar	Antananarivo	Ivato International Airport	Postponed	
Madagascar	Antsiranana	Arrachart Airport		
Madagascar	Mahajanga	Amborovy Airport		
Madagascar	Nosy Be	Fascene Airport		
Mauritius	Plaine Magnien	Sir Seewoosagur Ramgoolam International Airport	Postponed	
France	Dzaoudzi	Dzaoudzi–Pamandzi International Airport	Hub	
France	Saint Denis	Roland Garros Airport		
France	Saint-Pierre	Pierrefonds Airport	Terminated	
Mozambique	Pemba	Pemba Airport	Postponed	
Tanzania	Dar es Salaam	Julius Nyerere International Airport	Seasonal	

As Air Austral has retired its ATR 72-500s, Air Austral has been wet-leasing Ewa Air's ATR 72-600s for a period of time and then goes back to Ewa Air repeatedly. Air Austral uses Ewa Air's ATR 72-600s to fly to these destinations:

Country	City	Airport	Notes
Madagascar	Antsiranana	Arrachart Airport	
Madagascar	Nosy Be	Fascene Airport	
Madagascar	Toamasina	Toamasina Airport	
Mauritius	Rodrigues	Plaine Corail Airport	

=== Codeshare agreements ===
Ewa Air has codeshare agreements with the following airlines:

- Air Austral

== Fleet ==
As of August 2025, Ewa Air operates the following aircraft:

Ewa Air fleet
Aircraft	In service	Orders	Passengers	Notes
ATR 72-600	2	—	64	Leased from Investec
Total	2	0		
