= Amborovy Airport =

Airport servng Mahajanga, Madagascar

Amborovy Airport Philibert Tsiranana Airport
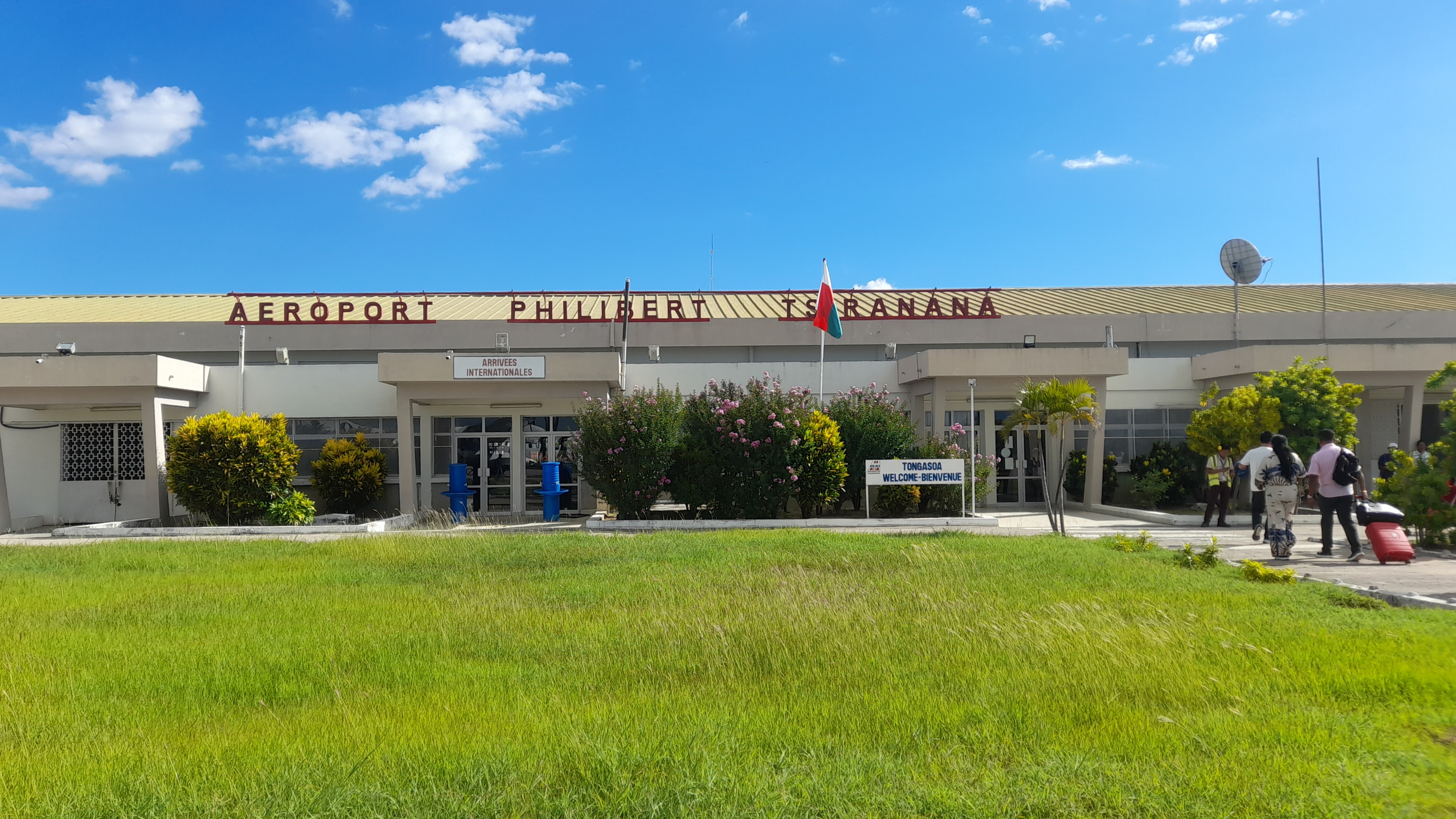
- IATA: MJN; ICAO: FMNM

Summary
- Airport type: Public
- Operator: Adema (Aéroport de Madagascar)
- Serves: Mahajanga, Madagascar
- Elevation AMSL: 87 ft / 27 m
- Coordinates: 15°40′01″S 46°21′06″E

Map
- Location of Airport in Madagascar

Runways
Direction	Length		Surface
Direction	m	ft	Surface
14/32	2,200	7,218	Asphalt
- Source: DAFIF

Amborovy Airport (IATA: MJN, ICAO: FMNM), also known as Philibert Tsiranana Airport, is an airport in Mahajanga, Madagascar.

== Airlines and destinations ==
Airlines	Destinations
Ewa Air	Dzaoudzi
Madagascar Airlines	Antananarivo

== Roads ==
The airport is linked to the city of Mahajanga by the National Road 54 (8 km).
