= Sambava Airport =

Airport in Madagascar

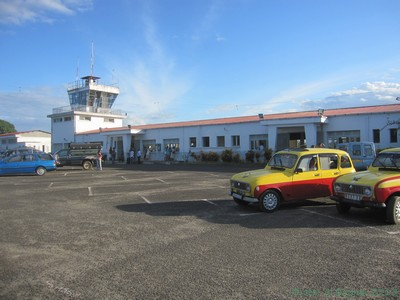
- IATA: SVB; ICAO: FMNS

Summary
- Airport type: Public/Military
- Operator: ADEMA (Aéroports de Madagascar)
- Serves: Sambava
- Location: Sava Region, Madagascar
- Elevation AMSL: 20 ft / 6 m
- Coordinates: 14°16′43″S 50°10′29″E

Map
- Location within Madagascar

Runways
Direction	Length		Surface
Direction	ft	m	Surface
16/34	4,577	1,395	Asphalt
- DAFIF

Sambava Airport is an airport in Sambava, Sava Region, Madagascar (IATA: SVB, ICAO: FMNS).

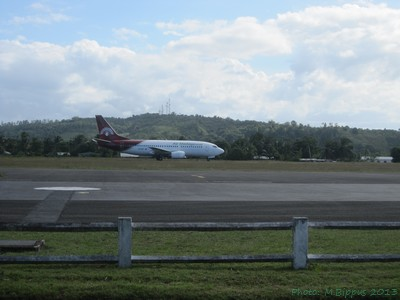
Air Madagascar 737-300 at Sambava

== Airlines and destinations ==
Airlines	Destinations
Madagascar Airlines	Antananarivo, Antsiranana, Maroantsetra, Toamasina
