= Maroantsetra Airport =

Airport in Madagascar

- IATA: WMN; ICAO: FMNR

Summary
- Airport type: Public/Military
- Operator: ADEMA (Aéroports de Madagascar)
- Serves: Maroantsetra
- Location: Ambatosoa, Madagascar
- Elevation AMSL: 13 ft / 4 m
- Coordinates: 15°26′12″S 49°41′18″E

Map
- Location within Madagascar

Runways
Direction	Length		Surface
Direction	ft	m	Surface
14/32	4,265	1,300	Asphalt
- DAFIF

Maroantsetra Airport is an airport in Maroantsetra, the capital of the region of Ambatosoa in Madagascar (IATA: WMN, ICAO: FMNR).

== Airlines and destinations ==
Airlines	Destinations
Madagascar Airlines	Antananarivo, Sambava, Toamasina
