= Réunion Tram Train =

Defunct planned railway line on Réunion island

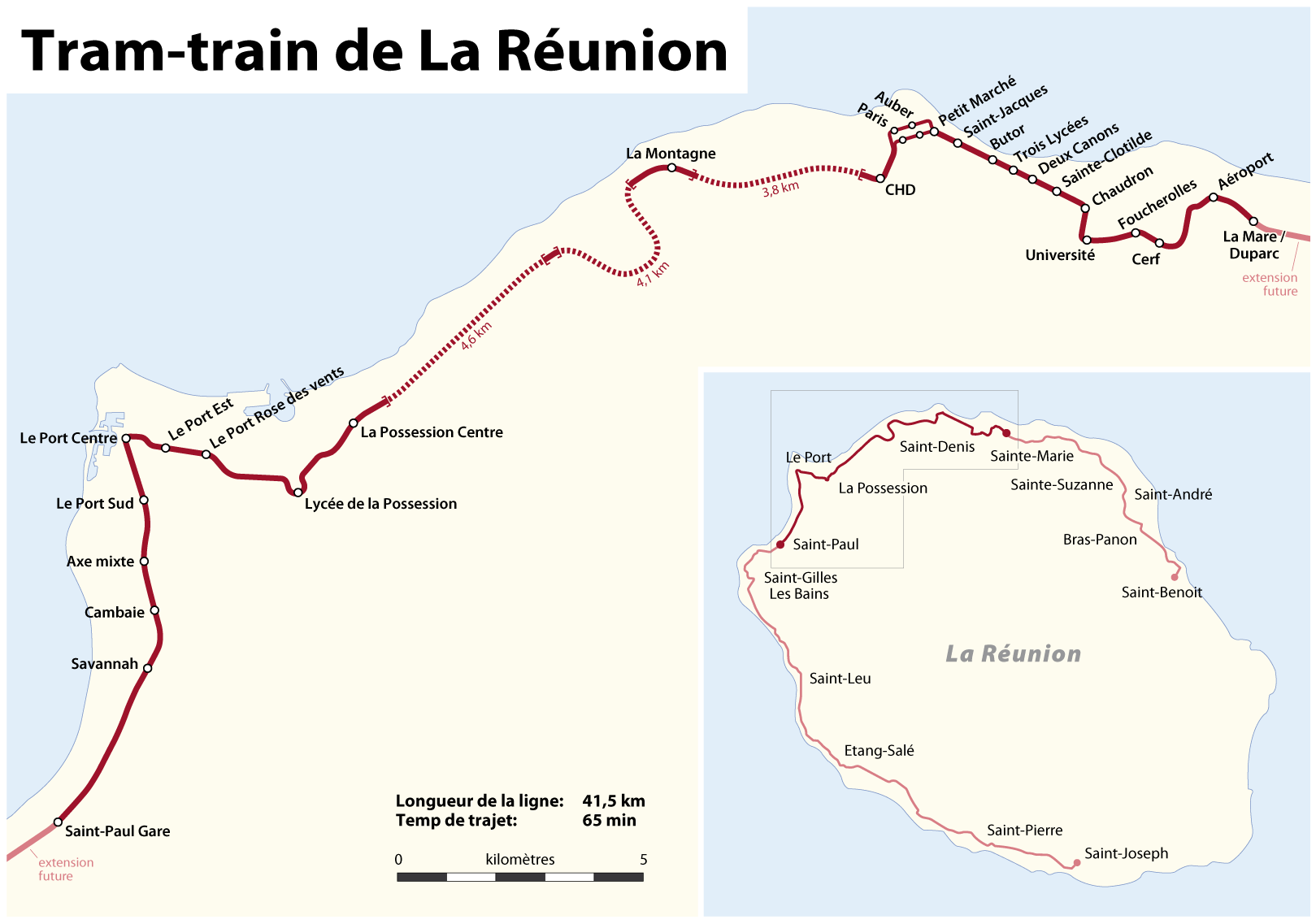
Map of the planned route

The Réunion Tram Train (French: Tram-train de la Réunion) was a planned tram-train line to run approximately 140 kilometres along the coast of Réunion, an island of France in the Indian Ocean. Construction of the first phase was scheduled to start in 2010, for opening in 2013. The Tram'Tiss consortium was preferred bidder for a PPP concession to develop the line. However, the project was abandoned in May 2010 due to a lack of funds.

== History ==
Reunion used to have a rail system opened in the 1890s and closed in the 1950s and 1960s when population and traffic congestion were less.

The new line would have operated as a hybrid of a tram and a train, with tram-like street-level stations in the towns and train-like speeds of up to 100 km/h on dedicated right of way between them. Trains would have been capable of carrying up to 250 passengers; the route would have also been capable of carrying freight from the port.

From west to north, the projected route of the first phase (41.5 km, 26 stations) would start from Saint-Paul and pass through Saint-Denis, terminating at Roland Garros Airport in Sainte Marie. The mountainous topography of Réunion would have required a large number of viaducts and tunnels: the first phase includes 11 major engineering structures, including a 10-kilometre tunnel and the highest railway bridge in the world. The cost was estimated to be €1.25 billion for the first phase alone. Extensions east to Saint-Benoît and south to Saint-Joseph were planned.

The project was abandoned in May 2010 due to a lack of funds.

In 2019 a light rail system was proposed to link Le Barachois with the airport.

== See also ==
- List of longest tunnels
- List of highest bridges in the world
