= Roland Garros Airport =

Airport in Réunion

Roland Garros Airport Aéroport de la Réunion Roland Garros
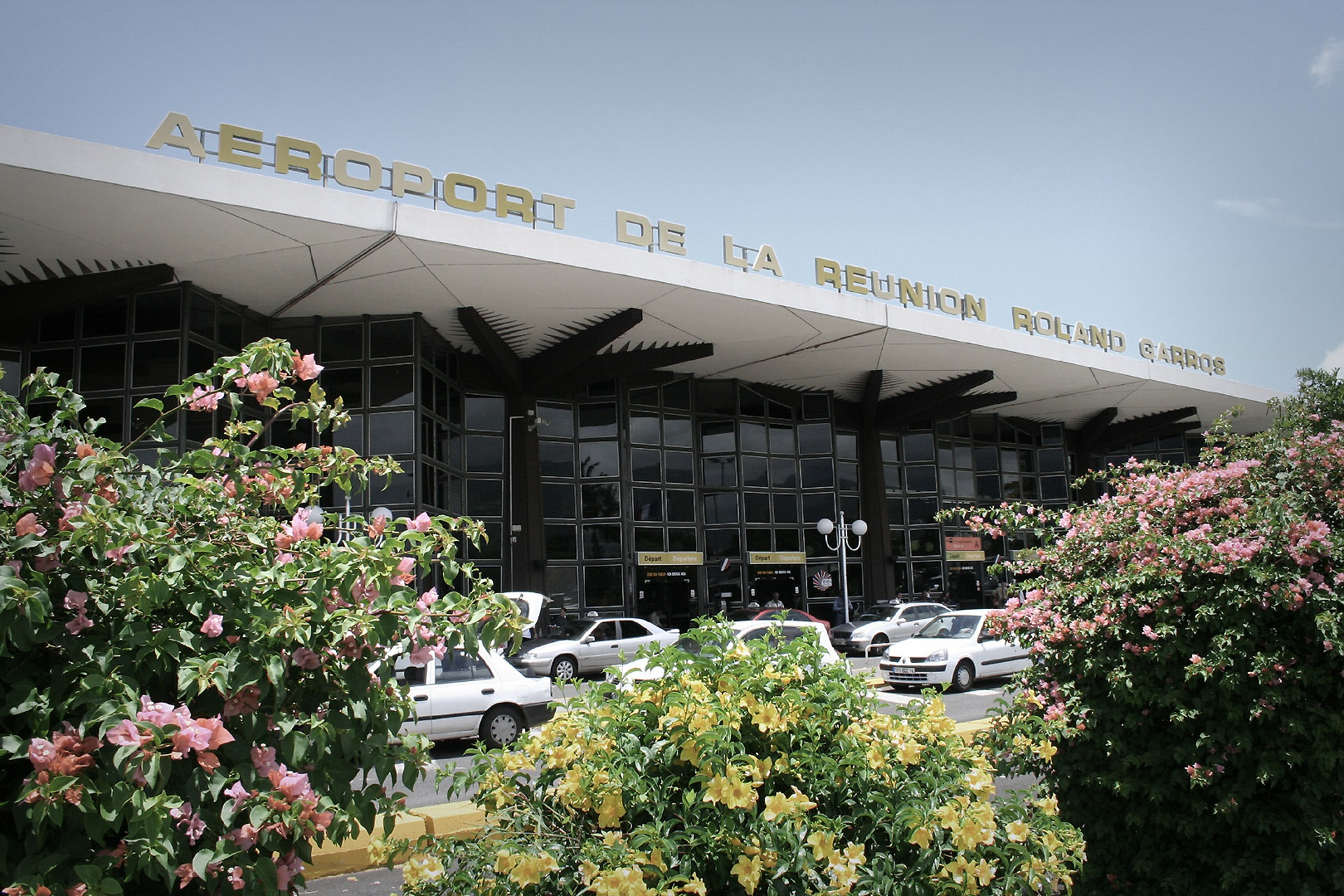
- IATA: RUN; ICAO: FMEE

Summary
- Airport type: Public
- Serves: Saint-Denis, Réunion, France
- Hub for: Air Austral
- Elevation AMSL: 20 m (66 ft)
- Coordinates: 20°53′24″S 055°30′59″E
- Website: reunion.aeroport.fr

Map
- Location of airport in Réunion RUN (Indian Ocean) RUN (Africa)

Runways
Direction	Length		Surface
Direction	m	ft	Surface
12/30	3,200	10,499	Asphalt
14/32	2,670	8,760	Asphalt

Statistics (2023)
- Passengers: 2,689,954
- Passenger traffic change: ▲14.7%
- Aircraft movements: 32,900
- Aircraft movements change: ▲8.0%
- Source : Aeroport.fr, French AIP, DAFIF, Statistics

Roland Garros Airport (French: Aéroport de la Réunion Roland Garros) (IATA: RUN, ICAO: FMEE), formerly known as Gillot Airport, is an international airport located in Sainte-Marie on Réunion, France. The airport is 7 kilometres (3.8 NM) east of Saint-Denis; it is named after the French aviator Roland Garros, who was born in Saint-Denis.

== Overview ==
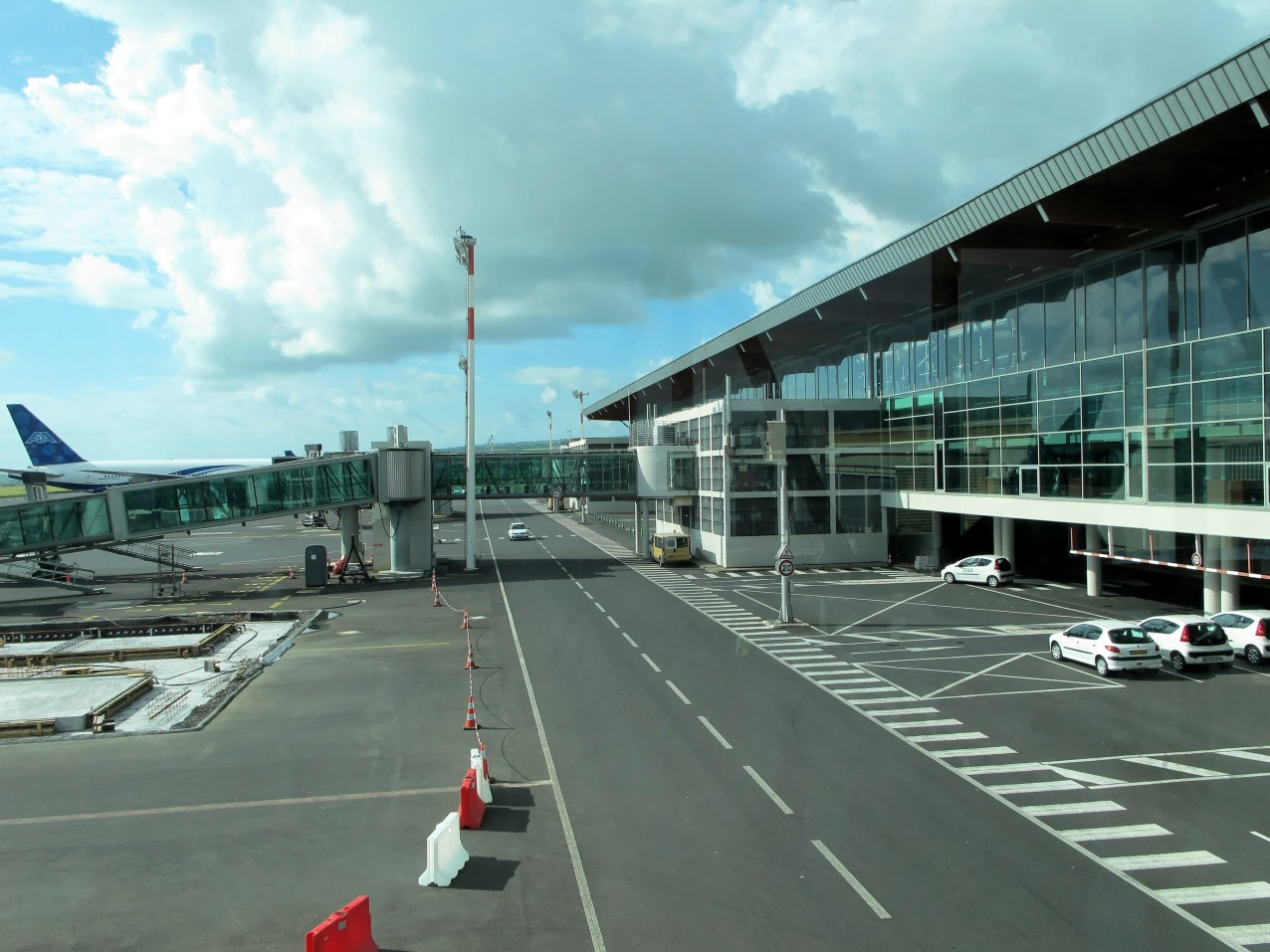
Terminal gates

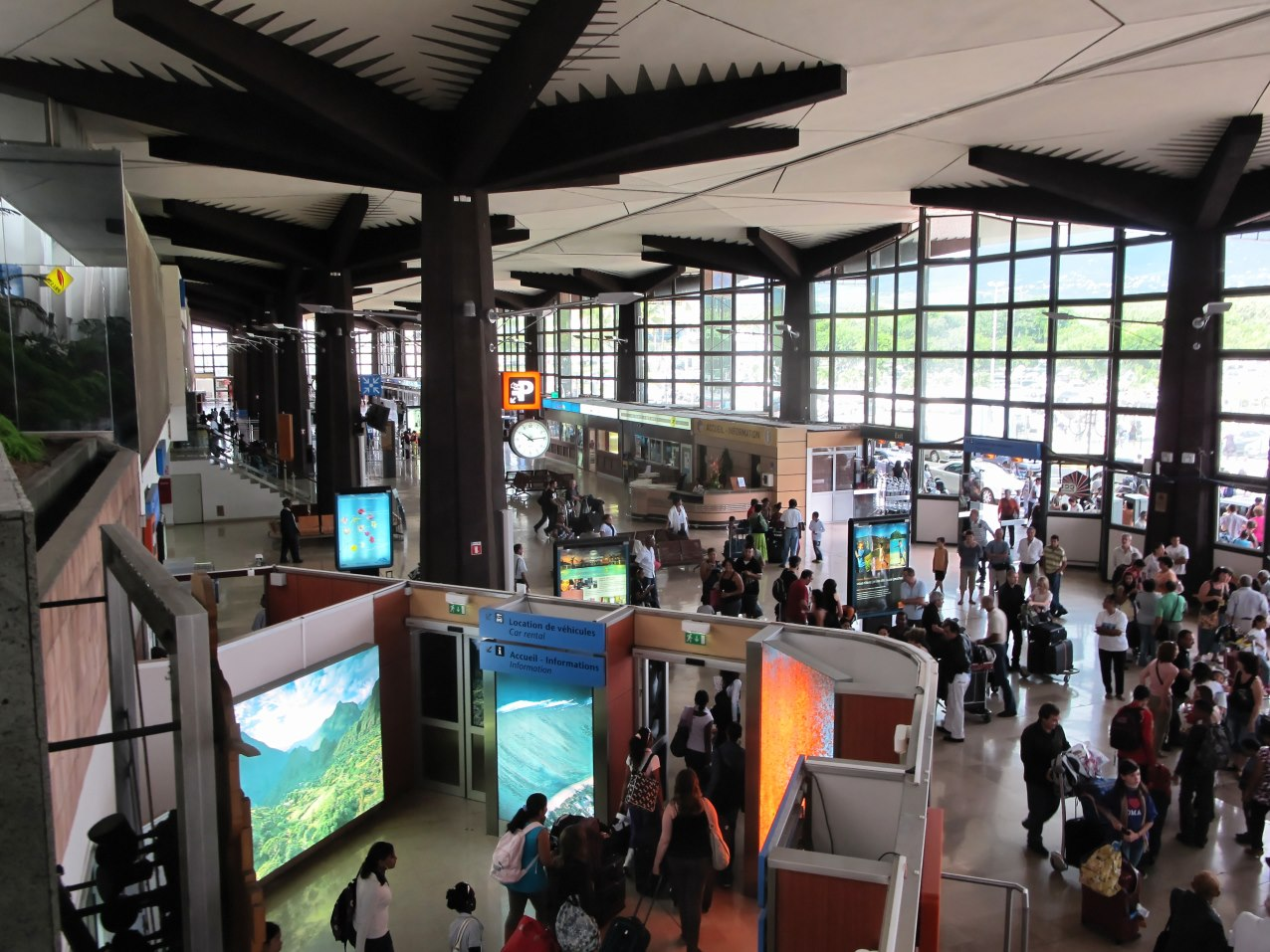
Terminal

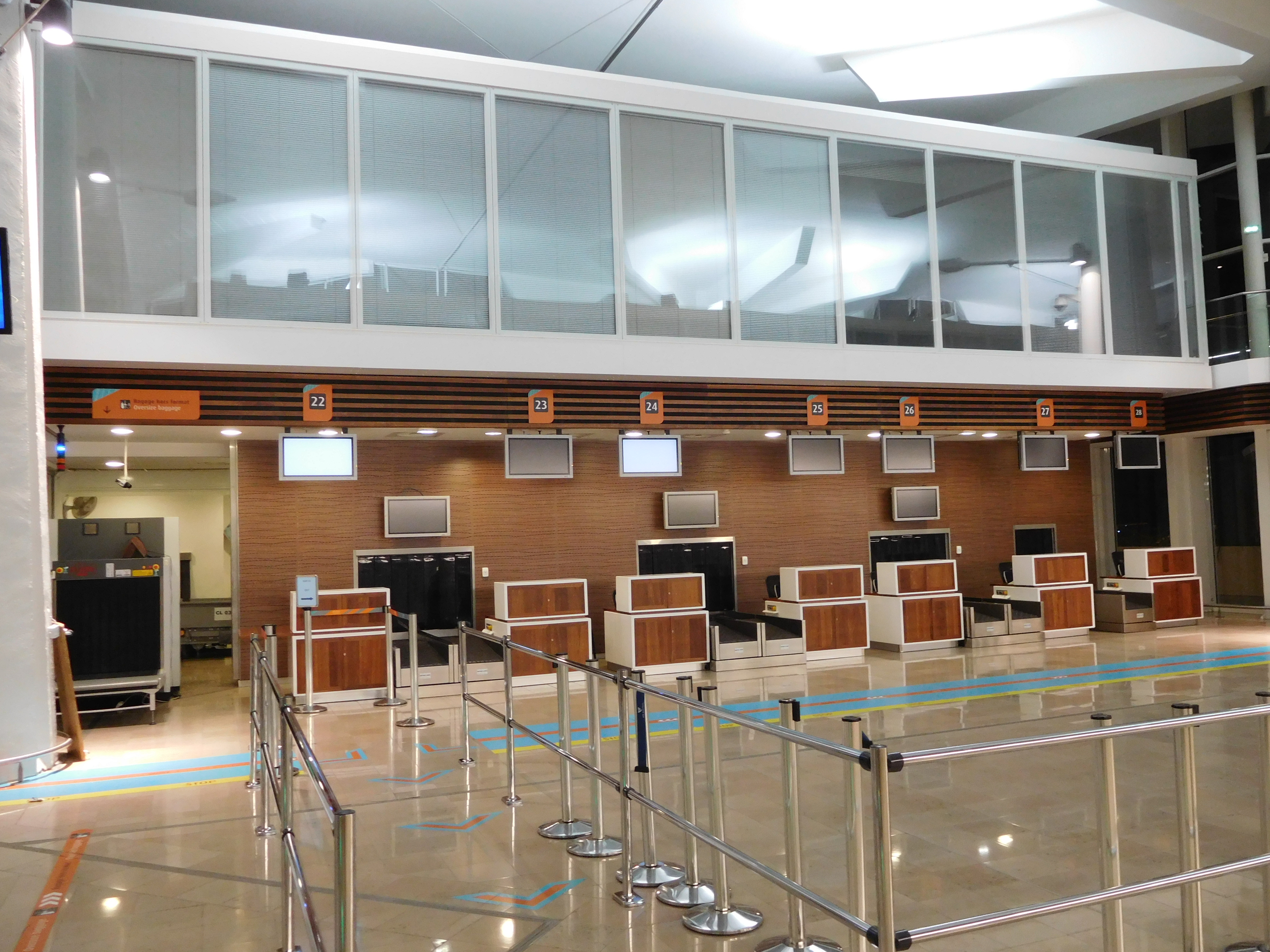
Check-in counters

Roland Garros Airport is the hub of Air Austral and served 2,293,042 passengers in 2017 (8.8% more than in 2016). Air Austral also has its head office on the airport property. When Air Bourbon existed until 2004, its head office also was on the airport property. The airport is at an elevation of 20 m (66 ft) above mean sea level. It has two asphalt paved runways: 12/30 measuring 3,200 by 45 metres (10,499 ft × 148 ft) and 14/32 measuring 2,670 by 45 metres (8,760 ft × 148 ft).

It operates the world's three longest domestic flight routes; to Paris (Charles De Gaulle and Orly) and to Marseille.

== Airlines and destinations ==
Airlines	Destinations
Air Austral	Antananarivo, Antsiranana, Bangkok–Suvarnabhumi, Dzaoudzi, Johannesburg–O. R. Tambo, Mauritius, Moroni, Nosy Be, Paris–Charles de Gaulle, Toamasina
Air France	Paris–Charles de Gaulle
Air Mauritius	Mauritius
Corsair International	Antananarivo, Dzaoudzi, Marseille, Paris–Orly, Toulouse
Ewa Air	Dzaoudzi
French Bee	Paris–Orly
IndiGo	Chennai

== Ground transport ==
It was once planned to construct a Réunion Tram Train to link the airport to the capital Saint-Denis and Saint-Paul, but plans for the construction were abandoned in 2013.

== See also ==
- Pierrefonds Airport
