= Nosy Be Airport =

Airport in Madagascar

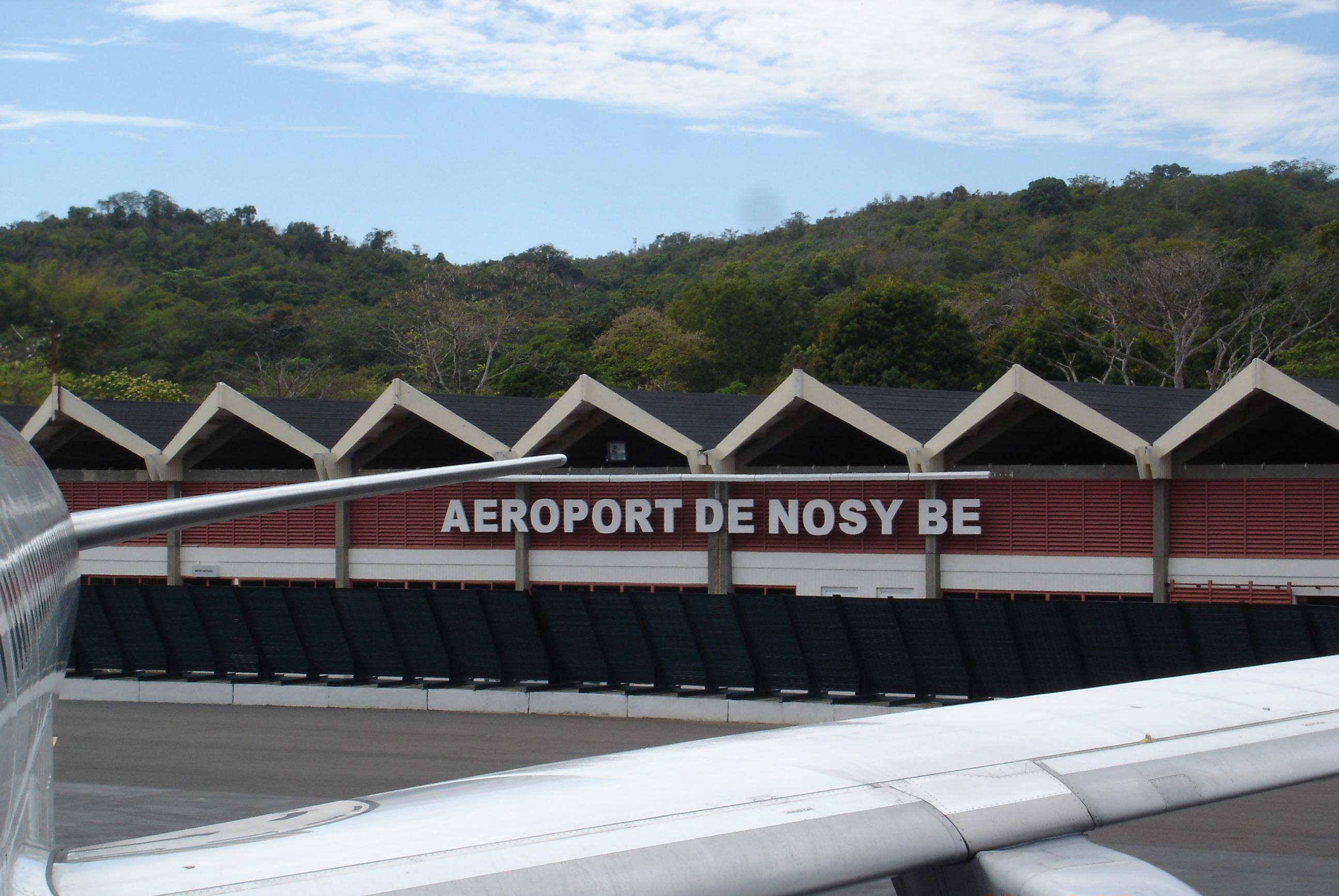
- IATA: NOS; ICAO: FMNN

Summary
- Airport type: Public
- Owner: The Government of Madagascar
- Operator: Ravinala Airports
- Serves: Nosy Be
- Location: Nosy Be, Madagascar
- Time zone: East Africa Time (UTC+3:00)
- Elevation AMSL: 36 ft (11 m)
- Coordinates: 13°18′43″S 048°18′53″E
- Website: nosybe-airport.aero

Map
- Location of Airport in Madagascar

Runways
Direction	Length		Surface
Direction	m	ft	Surface
05/23	2,190	7,185	Asphalt
- Source: DAFIF

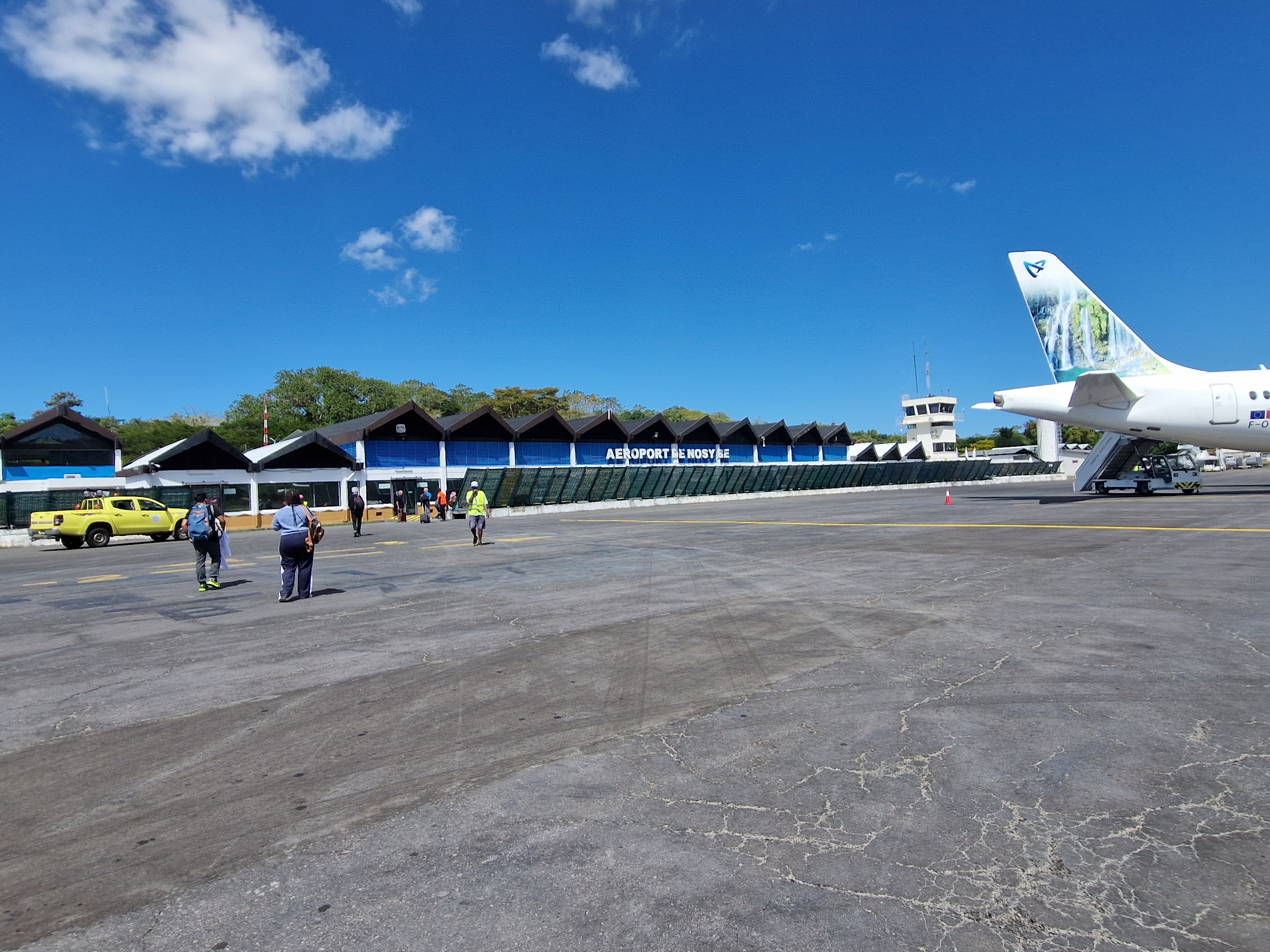
Fascene Airport in Nosy Be

Nosy Be Airport (IATA: NOS, ICAO: FMNN) is an international airport located on the island of Nosy Be, just off the northwest coast of Madagascar, in the Diana region. Since Nosy Be is one of the most developed tourism destinations in Madagascar, the airport is one of the busiest in the country.

== Airlines and destinations ==
Airlines	Destinations
Airlink	Johannesburg–O. R. Tambo
Air Austral	Saint-Denis de la Réunion
Ethiopian Airlines	Addis Ababa
Ewa Air	Dzaoudzi
Madagascar Airlines	Antananarivo
Neos	Seasonal: Milan–Malpensa, Rome–Fiumicino; Seasonal charter: Poznań

== Traffic ==
This airport hosted following numbers of passengers:

Frequentation
year	passagers	ref.
2016	184.000	
2019	212.099	
2024	233.560	
2025	264.604	
