= Toamasina Ambalamanasy Airport =

Airport in Madagascar

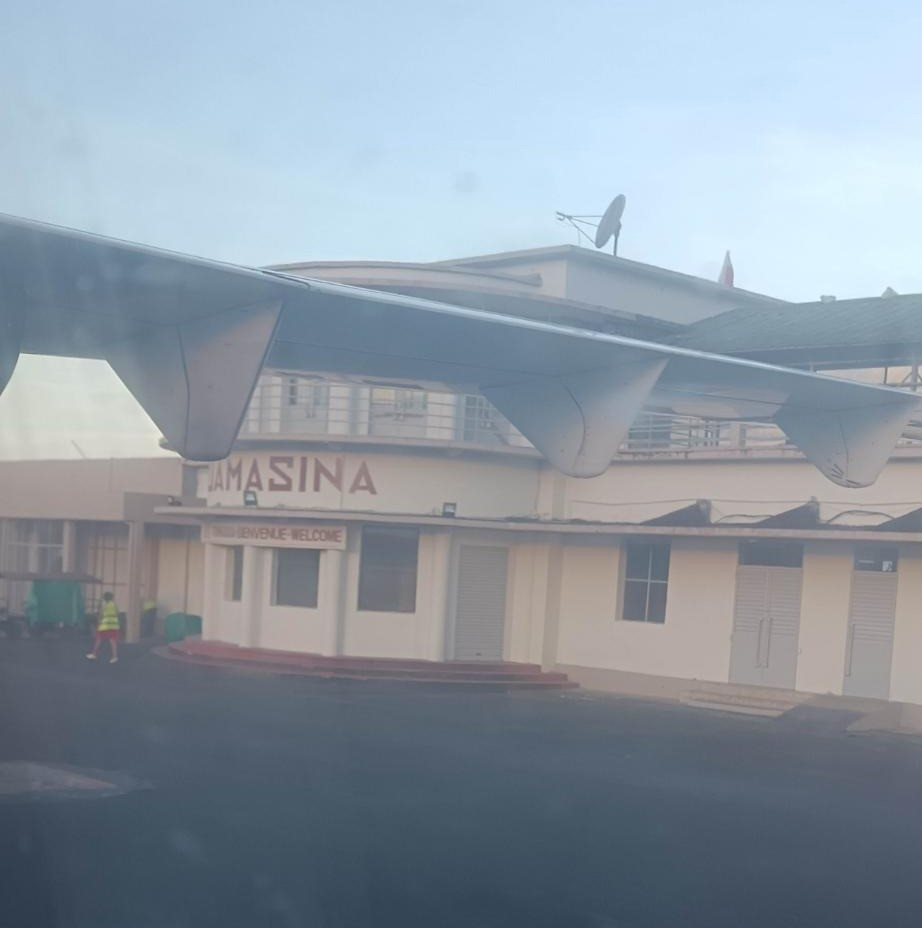
- IATA: TMM; ICAO: FMMT

Summary
- Airport type: Public
- Location: Toamasina
- Elevation AMSL: 7 m (23 ft)
- Coordinates: 18°06′34.26″S 49°23′33.13″E

Map
- Location of Airport in Madagascar

Runways
Direction	Length		Surface
Direction	m	ft	Surface
01/19	2,171	7,218	Asphalt

Toamasina Ambalamanasy Airport is an airport in Toamasina, Atsinanana Region, Madagascar (IATA: TMM, ICAO: FMMT). The airport is located about 5 km northwest of the city centre and is operated by the Aéroports de Madagascar Company (ADEMA S.A).

== Airlines and destinations ==
Airlines	Destinations
Air Austral	Saint-Denis de la Réunion
Madagascar Airlines	Antananarivo, Maroantsetra, Sainte-Marie, Sambava
