= Ivato International Airport =

Main airport of Madagascar

Ivato International Airport Seranam-Piaramanidina iraisampirenenan'Ivato Aéroport International d'Ivato
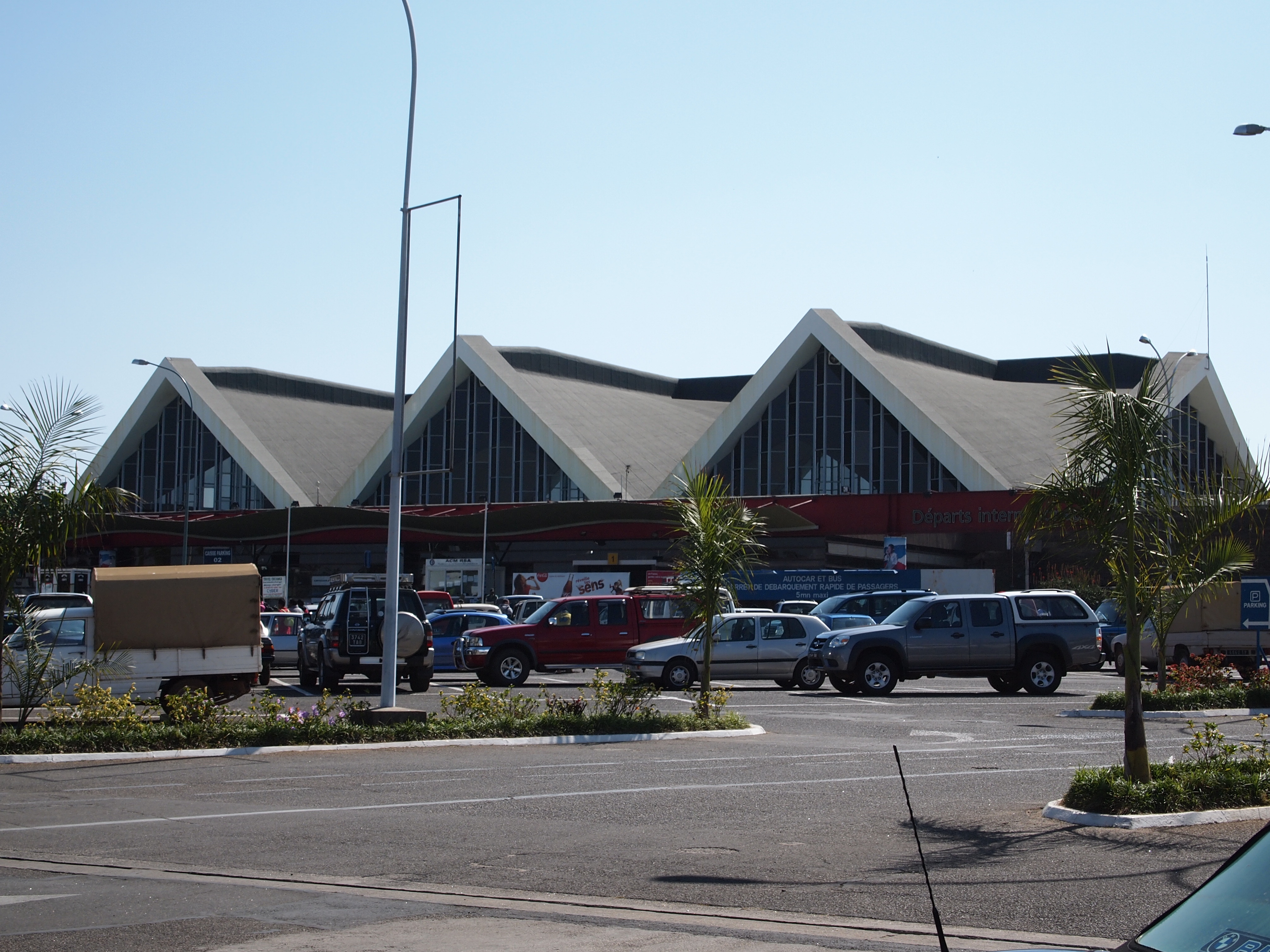
- IATA: TNR; ICAO: FMMI

Summary
- Airport type: Public / Military
- Operator: Ravinala Airports
- Serves: Antananarivo, Madagascar
- Hub for: Madagascar Airlines
- Elevation AMSL: 4,198 ft (1,280 m)
- Coordinates: 18°47′49″S 47°28′44″E
- Website: https://ravinala-airports.aero

Map
- Location of airport in Madagascar

Runways
Direction	Length		Surface
Direction	m	ft	Surface
11/29	3,100	10,171	Asphalt

Statistics (2024)
- Passengers: 975,000

Ivato International Airport (IATA: TNR, ICAO: FMMI) is the main international airport serving Antananarivo, the capital of Madagascar, located 16 kilometres (9.9 mi) northwest of the city centre. Ivato Airport is the main hub for Madagascar Airlines and is located in the commune of Ivato.

== History ==
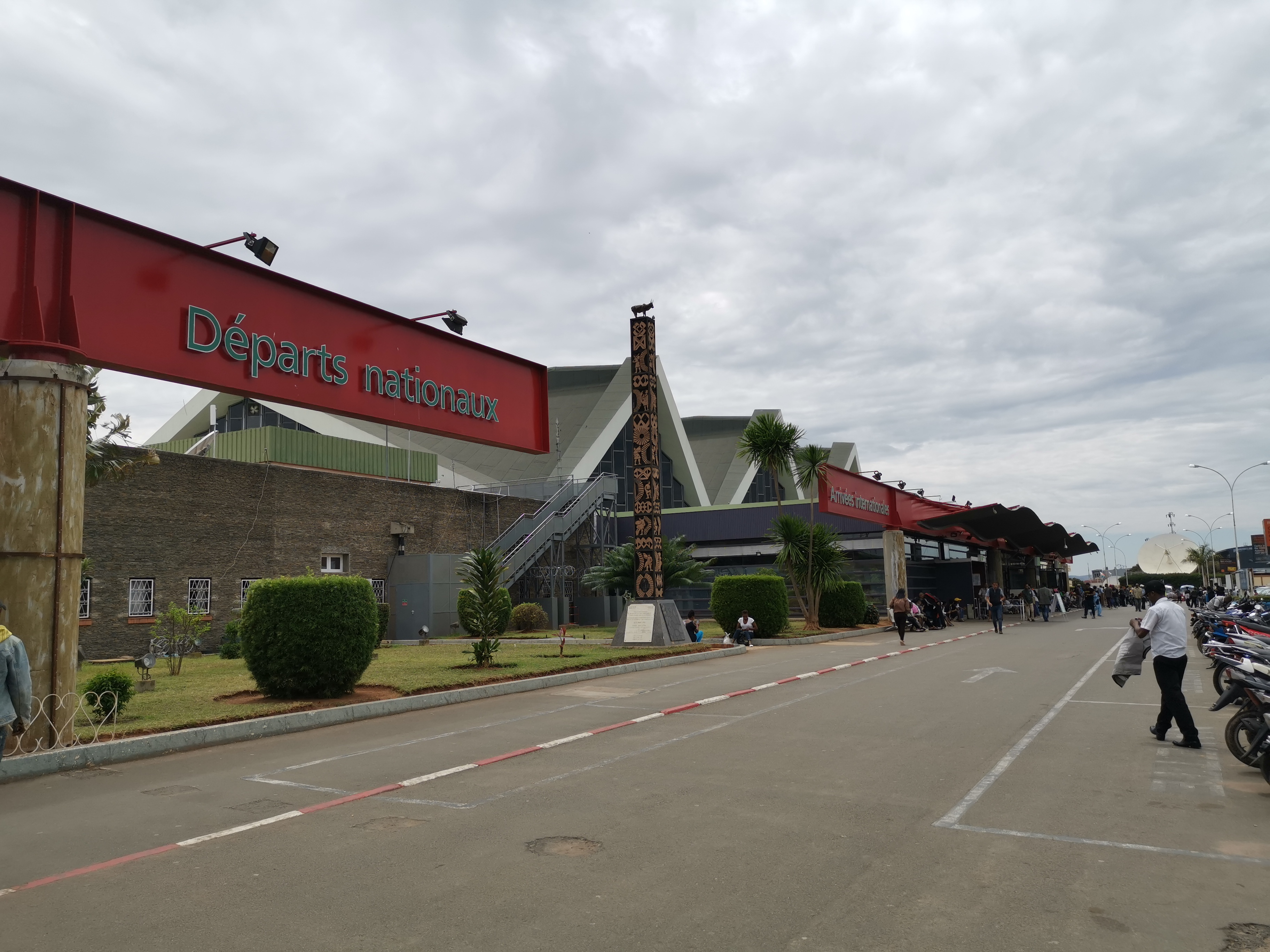
Departure hall

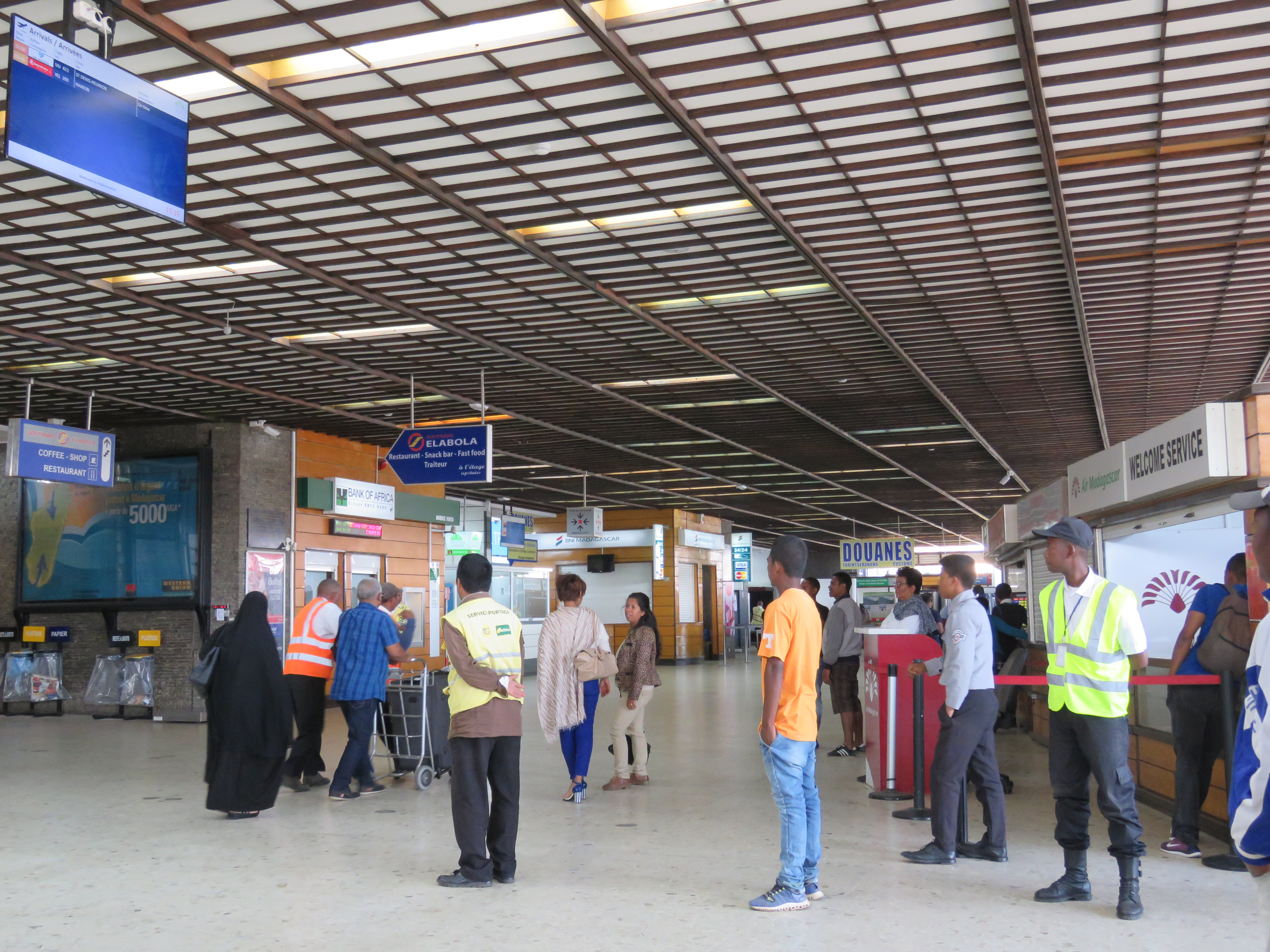
Terminal interior

Ivato has been the main airport of Antananarivo since the 1960s; it is a civil and military mixed platform and the main hub of Air Madagascar.

Madagascar's deadliest aviation accident occurred at the airport on 19 July 1967. A Douglas DC-4 of Air Madagascar departing for Antsiranana touched the ground 720 meters past the runway, briefly became airborne but crashed again just over 500 meters later, killing 42 of the 77 on board. Among the dead was foreign minister Albert Sylla.

It has two main terminals: one terminal for domestic flights and one terminal for international flights. In December 2021, a new terminal opened.

== Airlines and destinations ==
Airlines	Destinations
Airlink	Johannesburg–O. R. Tambo
Air Mauritius	Mauritius
Corsair International	Saint-Denis de la Réunion
Emirates	Dubai–International, Mahé
Ethiopian Airlines	Addis Ababa
Ewa Air	Dzaoudzi
Kenya Airways	Nairobi–Jomo Kenyatta
Madagascar Airlines	Antsiranana, Mahajanga, Maroantsetra, Morondava, Nosy Be, Sainte-Marie, Sambava Taolagnaro, Toamasina, Toliara
