= Toliara Airport =

Airport in Madagascar

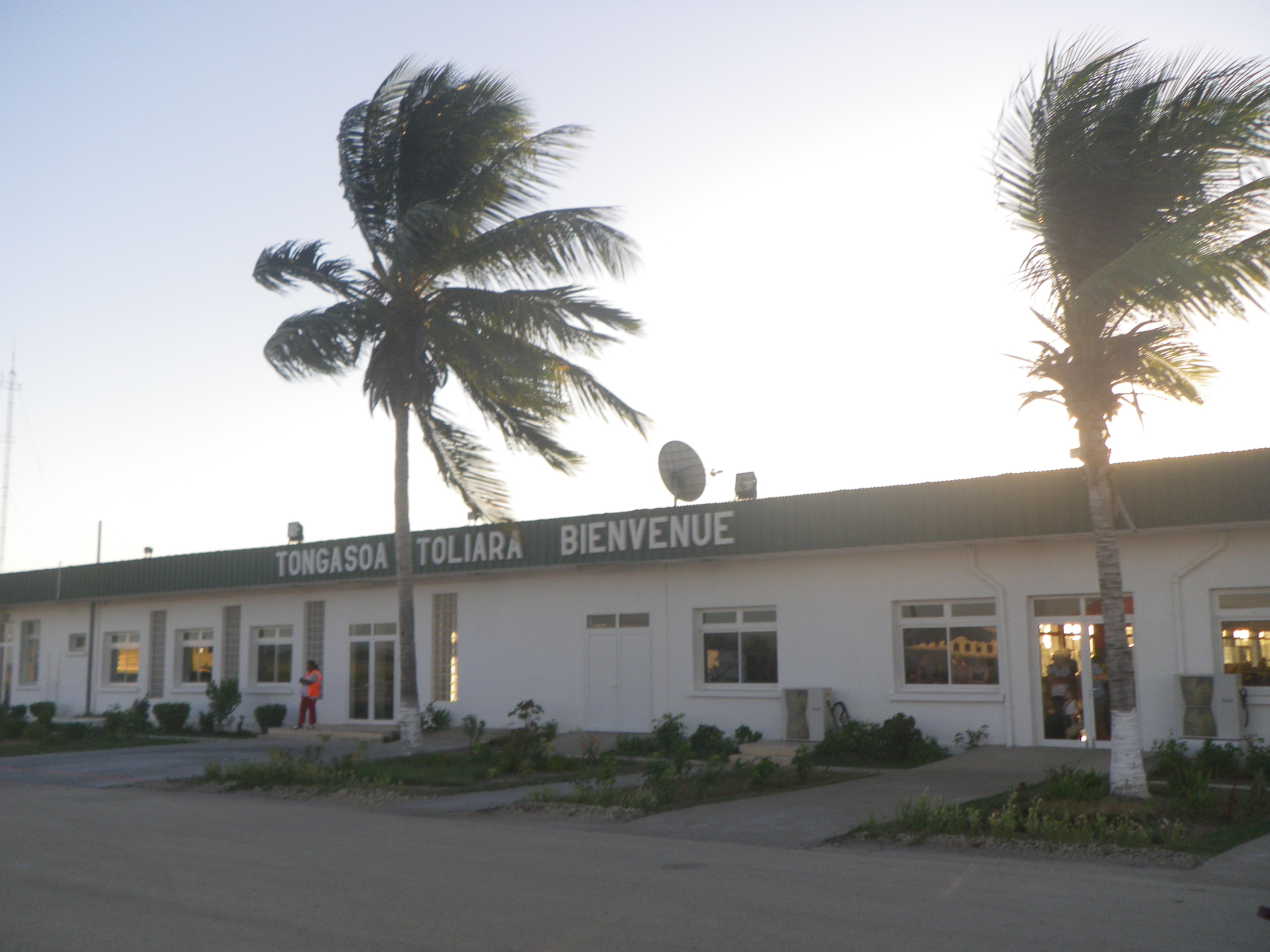
- IATA: TLE; ICAO: FMST

Summary
- Airport type: Public
- Operator: ADEMA (Aéroports de Madagascar)
- Serves: Toliara
- Location: Atsimo-Andrefana, Madagascar
- Elevation AMSL: 4 ft / 1 m
- Coordinates: 23°23′00″S 43°43′42″E

Map
- Location within Madagascar

Runways
Direction	Length		Surface
Direction	ft	m	Surface
04/22	6,562	2,000	Asphalt
11/29	2,625	800	Asphalt
- DAFIF

Toliara Airport is an airport in Toliara, Atsimo-Andrefana Region, Madagascar (IATA: TLE, ICAO: FMST).

== Airlines and destinations ==
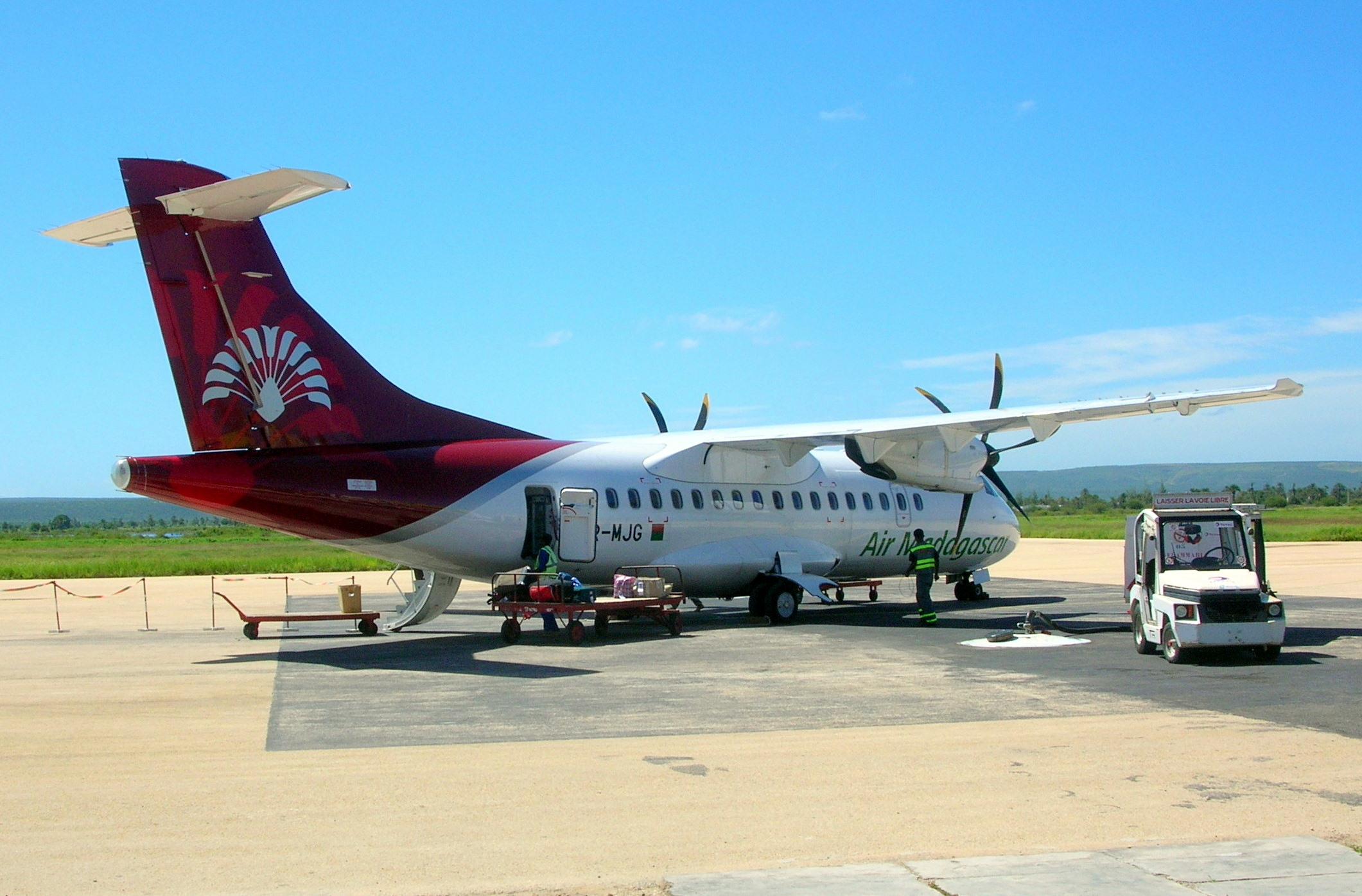
An ATR42-500 at the Toliara Airport

Airlines	Destinations
Madagascar Airlines	Antananarivo, Tôlanaro
