= Dzaoudzi–Pamandzi International Airport =

Dzaoudzi–Pamandzi International Airport Aéroport de Dzaoudzi-Pamandzi
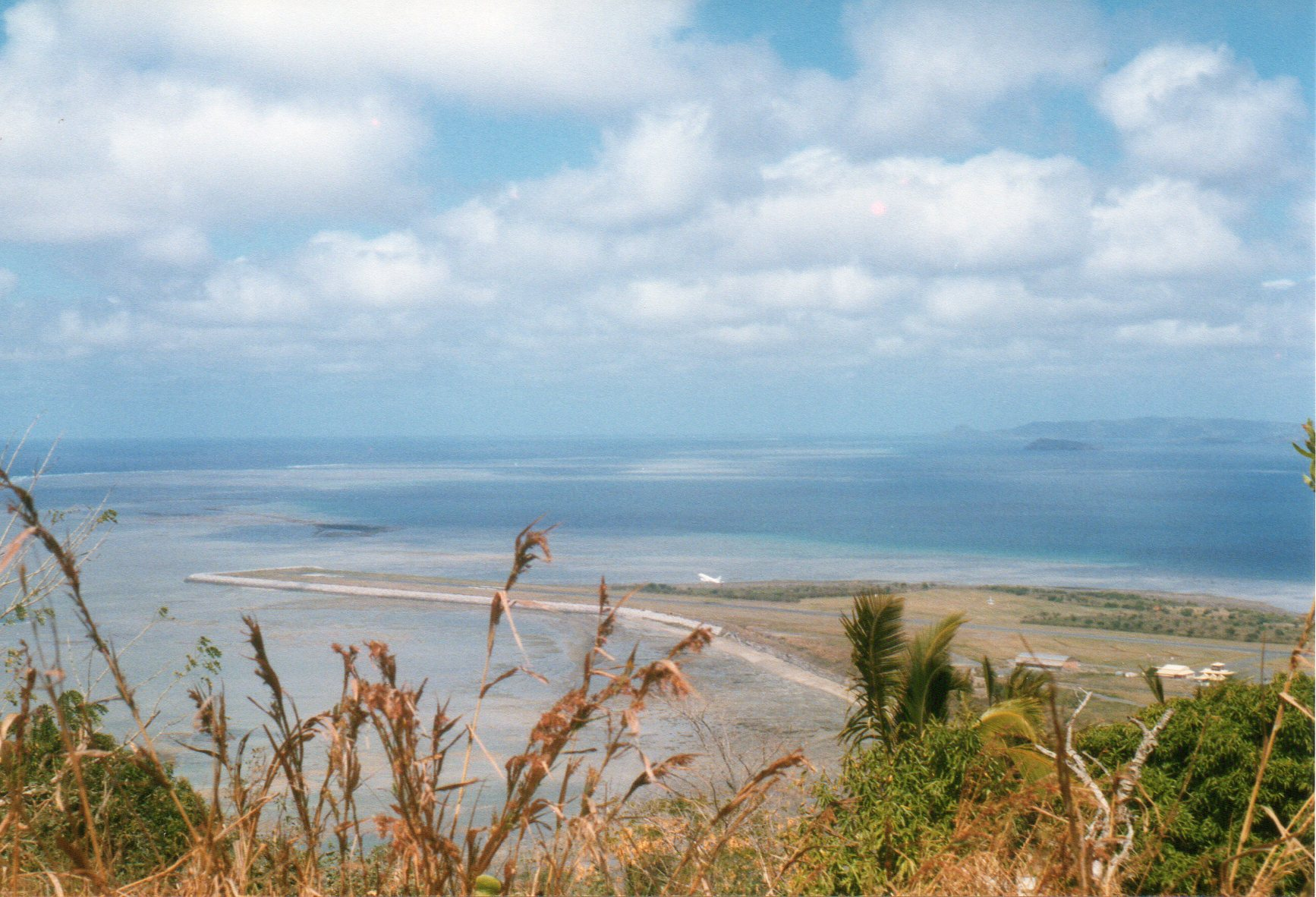
- IATA: DZA; ICAO: FMCZ

Summary
- Airport type: Public
- Operator: SNC-Lavalin Aéroport
- Serves: Dzaoudzi, Pamandzi
- Location: Pamandzi, Mayotte
- Hub for: Ewa Air
- Focus city for: Air Austral
- Elevation AMSL: 23 ft (7.0 m)
- Coordinates: 12°48′17″S 045°16′52″E
- Website: aeroport-mayotte.com

Map
- Location of airport in France Mayotte

Runways
Direction	Length		Surface
Direction	ft	m	Surface
16/34	6,330	1,929	Asphalt

Statistics (2023)
- Passengers: 450,357
- Passenger traffic change: ▲12.3%
- Aircraft movements: 17,386
- Aircraft movements change: ▲5.4%
- Source: AIP France, Aeroport.fr

Dzaoudzi–Pamandzi International Airport (IATA: DZA, ICAO: FMCZ) is an airport located in Pamandzi, Mayotte, France on the southern tip of the island of Petite-Terre (or Pamanzi), east of Grande-Terre, the main island of Mayotte. It is the only airport in Mayotte with scheduled services, mainly to destinations within Africa, Réunion and mainland France. The airport was able to service aircraft up to the Boeing 777 in size until 2015.

The headquarters of Ewa Air are located on the airport property.

A new runway (16/34) to the west of the original single runway was proposed, and will be built 2,600 metres in length to accommodate larger aircraft such as the Airbus A350 and Boeing 737 MAX. Once built, the older runway will become a taxiway. There will also be a new terminal built to replace the previous departure and arrival buildings. However, the project was never proceeded. There are now debates on whether to extend the current airport runway or build a new one at Grand-Terre.

Cyclone Chido severely damaged the airport in December 2024.

== Facilities ==
The airport is open from 5 am to 5:30 pm local time.

The airport consists of a cluster of several small buildings:

- two-story departure terminal building
- arrivals terminal
- control tower
- freight hangar

The airport has its own fleet of modern airport fire tenders (Carmichael Cobra 2 6x6 ARFF).

There are no large hangars or cargo-handling facilities at the airport.

The south tarmac area is reserved for the French military.

== See also ==
- List of airports in Mayotte
- Prince Said Ibrahim International Airport
