= Madagascar Airlines =

Flag carrier of Madagascar

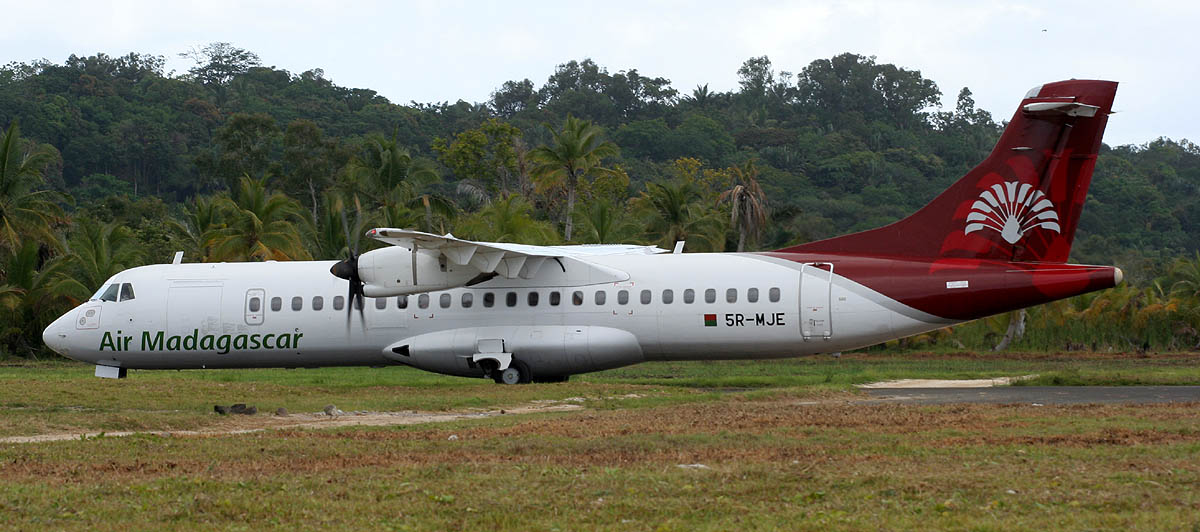
IATA	ICAO	Call sign
MD	MGY	AIR MADAGASCAR
- Founded: 1947; 79 years ago
- Hubs: Ivato International Airport
- Frequent-flyer program: Namako
- Alliance: Vanilla Alliance
- Subsidiaries: Tsaradia
- Fleet size: 9
- Destinations: 14
- Headquarters: Antananarivo, Madagascar
- Key people: Rado Rabarilala (General Directorl)
- Website: madagascarairlines.com

Madagascar Airlines is an airline based in Antananarivo, Madagascar. It is the flag carrier of Madagascar; it operates services to Europe, Asia and neighbouring African and Indian Ocean island destinations, from its main base, Ivato International Airport in Antananarivo. It also operates an extensive domestic network.

The airline was formed in 1947 to feed into flights by Transports Aériens Intercontinentaux and Air France, and upon the independence of Madagascar, it became the national airline. Initially operating services on domestic routes, the airline saw expansion in the late 1960s and 1970s, when it began international flights to destinations such as France and South Africa.

In recent years the airline has been a subject of failed privatisation measures. These are now on hold and the loss making airline is majority owned by the Malagasy government.

== History ==
=== Formative years ===
Air Madagascar was formed in March 1947 by Transports Aériens Intercontinentaux (TAI) in order to feed into flights by TAI and Air France. The airline began operations with two Air France Douglas DC-3s and six de Havilland D.H.89 Dragon Rapides. In 1957 TAI and Messageries Maritimes acquired shares in the airline, and in 1958 a third DC-3 was added to the fleet. In 1961 the Malagasy government, Air France and TAI reorganised the airline. In April 1961 the airline was renamed Madair and became the flag carrier for the newly independent republic. On 23 August 1961, the status of Société Nationale Malgache des Transports Aériens, MADAIR was approved by decree. On 20 October 1961 a service from Antananarivo-Paris, via Djibouti, with a Douglas DC-7 leased from TAI was inaugurated. Société Nationale Malgache des Transports Aériens, MADAIR was created on 13 November 1961, with a working capital of 400 million CFA Francs, 447 employees, and a fleet comprising two Douglas DC-4s, seven DC-3s and four Dragon Rapides. The government held 20%, Air France 44% and TAI 36% shareholdings, and the government held an option to increase its shareholding to some 65%.

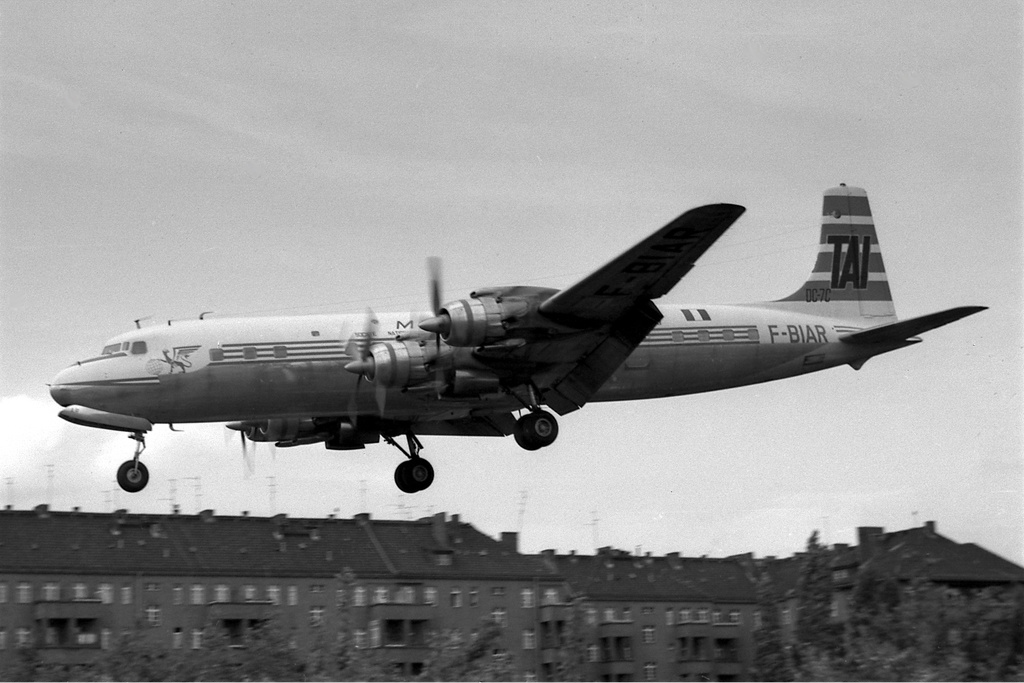
DC-7 of Madair seen at Tempelhof Airport in West Berlin. (1962)

On 1 January 1962, Madair took over service to some 58 points in Madagascar, and on 14 October the name of the airline was changed to Air Madagascar, because of a negative image of the name Madair. In 1962 Air Madagascar carried 103,000 passengers, 7,500 tons of freight and 375 tons of mail and flew a distance of 2,400,000 kilometres (1,500,000 mi). On 31 December 1962, the company was renamed Société Nationale Malgache des Transports Aériens — Air Madagascar. A DC-3 of the airline crashed at Farafangana on 15 July 1963, killing five people. Flights to the Comoro Islands with DC-4s began in 1963. On 14 May 1963, the Malagasy government increased its share capital to 460 million CFA francs, and its shareholding from 20 to 30.44%.

=== Jet age ===
In October 1963 the airline signed an agreement with Air France, which saw Air Madagascar beginning a service to Paris, via Djibouti, in July 1964 with a Boeing 707, which was painted in Air Madagascar livery, and operated by Air France crews. In 1965 the Dragon Rapides began to be replaced by light aircraft, mainly Pipers, and a Nord 262 was ordered in 1966. On 19 July 1967, an Air Madagascar DC-4, on a scheduled flight from Antananarivo to Tamatave and Diego Suarez, crashed after take-off from Ivato International Airport, killing 42 people, including Albert Sylla, the Malagasy Foreign Minister. The airline began scheduled flights to Rome in 1968, and the airline acquired its first Boeing 737-200 in September 1969. The aircraft was maintained by South African Airways, and on 15 October, Air Madagascar began flights to Johannesburg, and in December began flights to Dar es Salaam and Nairobi via Majunga. On 14 February 1970, flights to Johannesburg operated via Lourenço Marques, and on 1 November, the 737 replaced the DC-4 on flights to the Comoros.

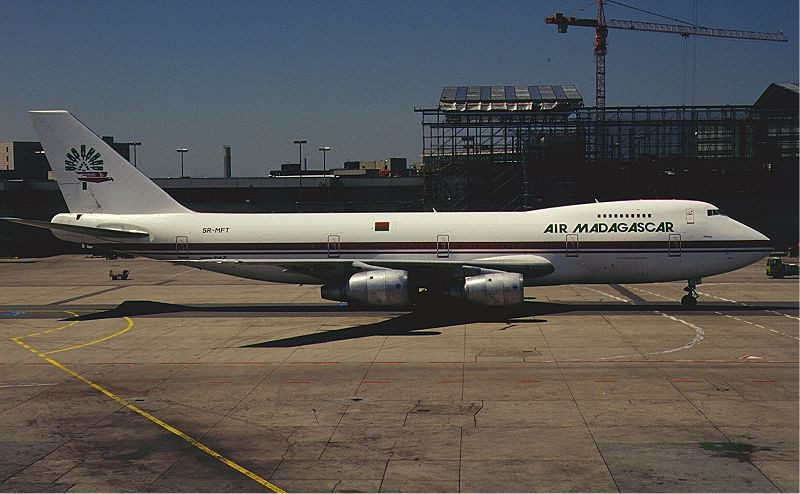
A former Air Madagascar Boeing 747-200 at Frankfurt Airport in 1996.

In 1971 four de Havilland Canada DHC-6 Twin Otters were acquired, allowing the airline to retire some DC-3s which were transferred to the Malagasy military. By 1972, the airline was operating 737s on domestic flights to Tamatave, Nosy Be, Diego Suarez and Sambava, allowing for the retirement of two DC-4s. A second 737 was delivered in December 1972, seeing the expansion of routes and frequencies on the airline's network. In April 1974, service with the 737s was extended to Mananjary, Tuléar and Fort Dauphin. In the late 1970s, services to Johannesburg were suspended as a result of apartheid in South Africa. In 1979 the airline acquired its first wide-body aircraft when a Boeing 747-200B Combi was delivered, with maintenance being handled by Air France. In early 1986 the airline joined the International Air Transport Association, and in the same year placed an order for ATR 42 to replace the HS-748s, which had been delivered to the airline in January 1980. Services to Johannesburg were resumed in 1990. In 1994, the airline leased a Boeing 737-300 from ILFC, which was delivered on 12 September, and was introduced on routes from Antananarivo to Johannesburg, Comoros, Mauritius, Nairobi, Réunion and Seychelles. Air Madagascar lost its monopoly on domestic flights in 1995, when the government liberalised the market, although few competitors have yet emerged. Flights to Munich and Rome began in 1996.

In September 1997, the airline ordered an additional three ATR 42 for delivery in October. Services to Singapore began in October 1998, and were suspended in 2002.

=== Towards privatisation ===
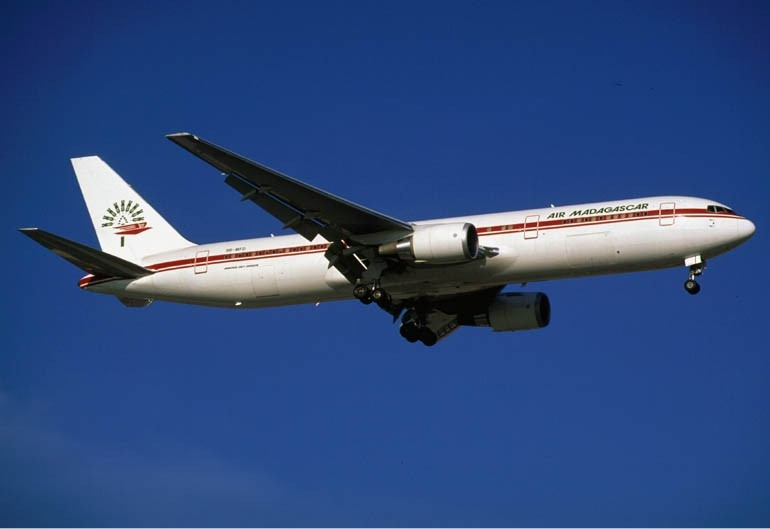
A former Air Madagascar Boeing 767-300ER.

As part of reorganisation plans to get the airline ready for privatisation, in January 1998, the airline announced that it would replace the Boeing 747-200 Combi with a Boeing 767-300ER. The airline purchased a new 767-300ER from Boeing with an April 1999 delivery date, and leased another aircraft from GE Capital Aviation Services from March 1998. Government plans for privatisation of the airline in 1999 to a consortium which include Air France was suspended when the Central Bank of Madagascar defaulted on payments to Exim Bank for the airline's Boeing 747.

In 2002, Lufthansa Consulting was awarded a management contract with Air Madagascar, with a view to improving the airlines' efficiency and making it an attractive enterprise for privatisation. The airline's creditors in November 2002 agreed to forgive half of the company's debts and rescheduled the rest over a three-year period. Because of the political crisis, the first half of 2001 saw a 66% drop in passenger traffic and a 71% drop in freight, which damaged the airline's revenues. The airline resumed flights to Paris from Antananarivo on 27 April 2003, taking over from Blue Panorama Airlines which had been operating on its behalf since the crisis began.

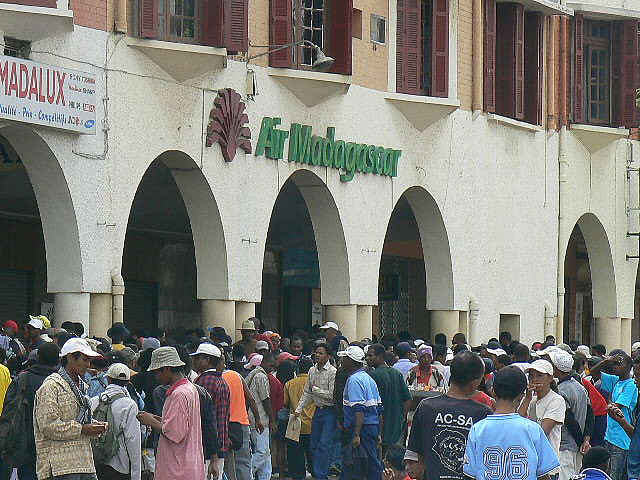
Air Madagascar head office

The first ATR 72 was delivered to the airline on 14 November 2005; the second was delivered to the airline at the Dubai Air Show a few weeks later.

On 17 June 2009, the airline introduced non-stop flights between Nosy Be and Paris.

In 2011 Air Madagascar was put on the list of air carriers banned in the European Union for safety concerns with their ageing fleet of Boeing 767-300 thus prompting the airline to charter a Euro Atlantic Airways Boeing 777-200 for their flights to France.

In 2012 an agreement was reached with Air France for long-term wet lease (ACMI or Aircraft Crew Maintenance and Insurance) of 2 surplus Airbus A340-300. The first aircraft (F-GLZL) was delivered in April 2012 and was originally crewed by Air France (it is now crewed by Air Atlanta Icelandic) and on the Iceland registry as TF-EAB, and the second aircraft (F-GLZT) arrived in July 2012, re-registered 5R-EAA, and is damp-leased with a domestic cabin crew. Despite being 14 and 12 years old respectively and having questionable fuel efficiency, these aircraft permit Air Madagascar to resume flights to Europe under its own colors and with better service.

=== Madagascar Airlines ===
In April 2023, the operations of Air Madagascar and it subsidiary Tsaradia were taken over by Madagascar Airlines, whose AOC was obtained to serve as a transitional process in the restructuring plans of both former airlines that were in a bankruptcy process. International operations were suspended in November 2023 to focus on domestic flights.

== Corporate affairs ==
=== Ownership ===
As of 2019, the airline is majority-owned by the Malagasy state (89.56%), with other shareholders being ARO (an insurance company)(5.53%), SONAPAR (or Société Nationale de Participations, the government's national shareholding company) (2.53%), Air France (1.65%), NY Havana (0.32%) and staff (0.39%).

=== Key people ===
As of November 2023, the chairman position was held by Mamy Rakotondraibe. In October 2025, the airline's CEO Thierry de Bailleul resigned. This came just two months after his mandate had been extended.

=== Business trends ===
Air Madagascar has been reported as making heavy losses, requiring government support to keep trading.

Full formal accounts do not seem to be regularly published; recent available figures (largely from AFRAA reports, although these have inconsistencies) are shown below (for years ending 31 December):

	2016	2017	2018
Turnover (MGAm)			
Net profit (MGAm)	loss	loss	loss
Number of employees (at year end)	1,017	928	812
Number of passengers (000s)	437	488	479
Passenger load factor (%)	63.9	66.3	61
Number of aircraft (at year end)	7	6	10
Notes/sources			

== Destinations ==
Madagascar Airlines serves destinations in Africa, and formerly Asia and Europe.

=== Codeshare agreements ===
Madagascar Airlines has codeshare agreements with the following airlines (as of June 2018):

- Air Austral
- Air Mauritius
- Air Seychelles
- Corsair
- Etihad Airways

== Fleet ==
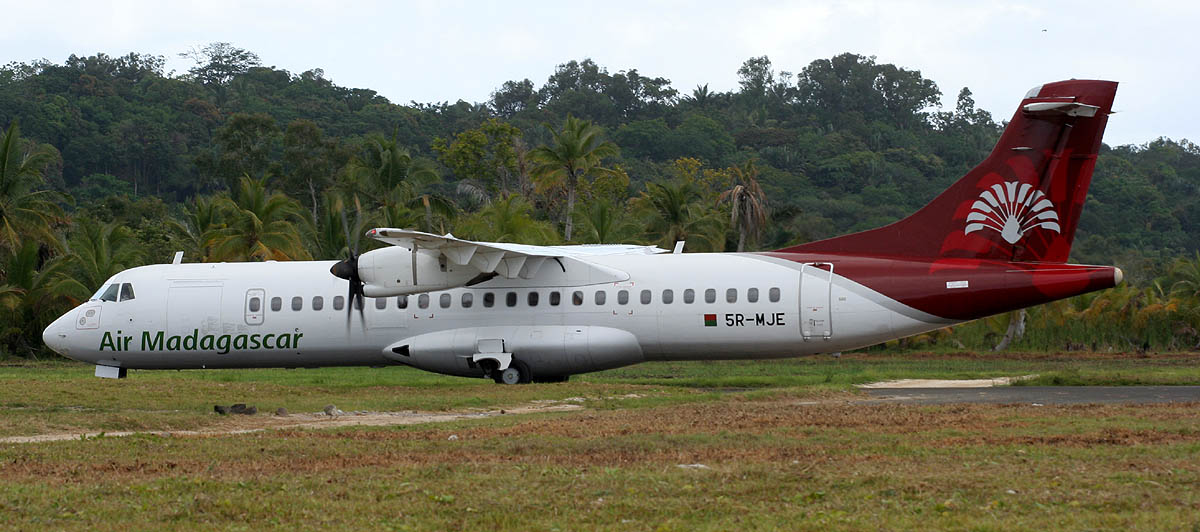
An Air Madagascar ATR 72-500.

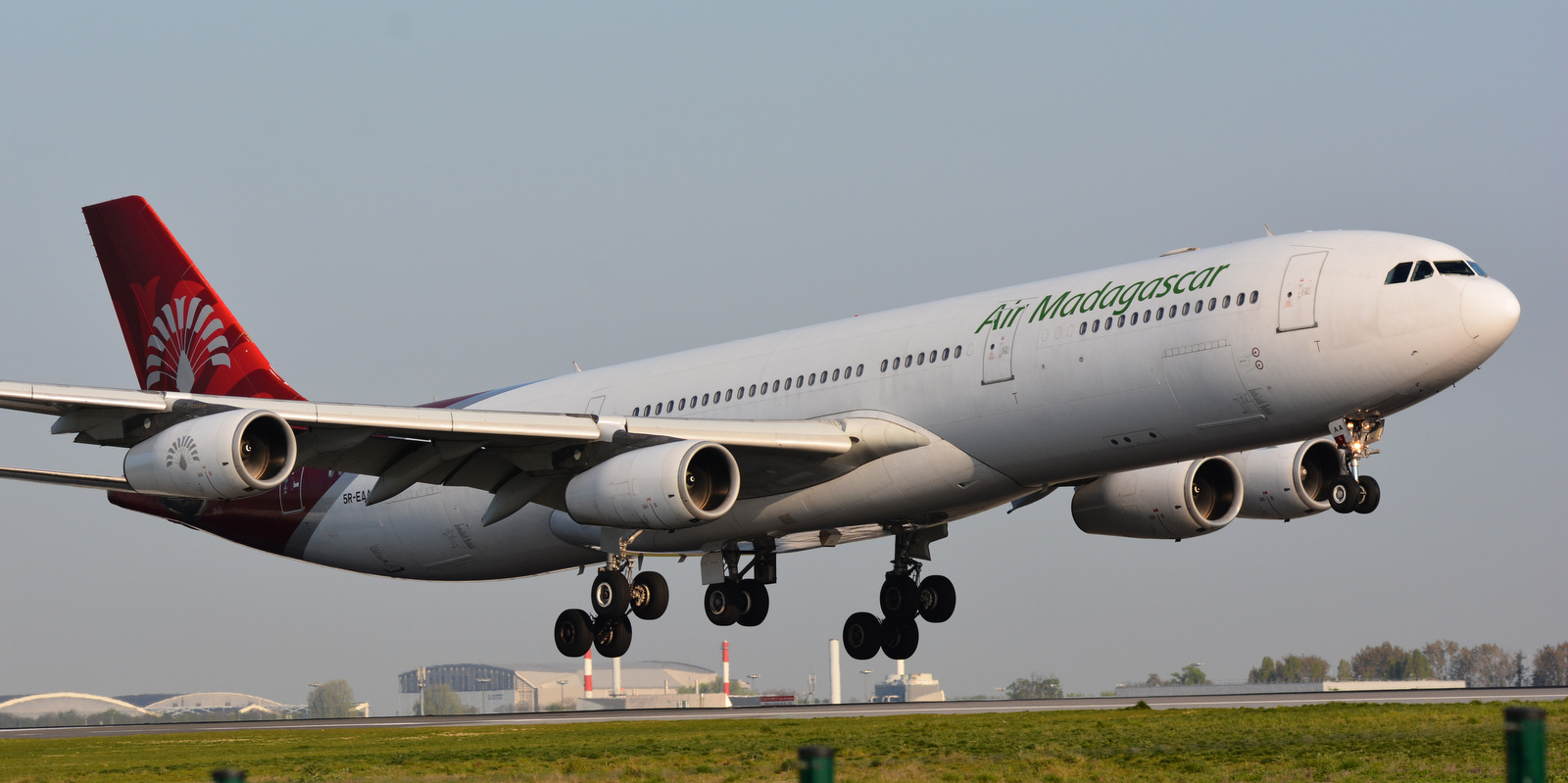
An Air Madagascar Airbus A340-300.

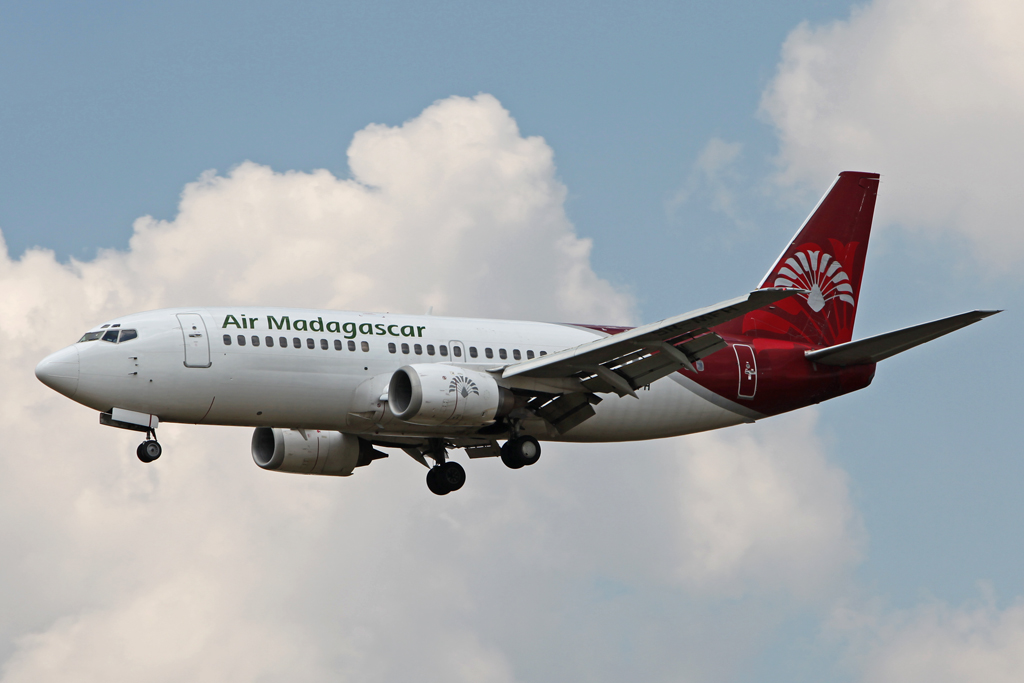
An Air Madagascar Boeing 737-300.

=== Current fleet ===
As of July 2026, Madagascar Airlines operates the following aircraft:

Madagascar Airlines fleet
Aircraft	In service	Orders	Passengers			Notes
Aircraft	In service	Orders	C	Y	Total	Notes
ATR 72-500	5	—	8	56	64	
ATR 72-500	5	—	8	62	70	
ATR 72-500	5	—	8	64	72	
ATR 72-600	1	—	10	62	72	
De Havilland Canada DHC-6 Twin Otter	3	—				All three are grounded, to be sold.
Total	9	—				

=== Fleet development ===
During the mid-2000s, Air Madagascar was looking to renew their fleet. The two ageing Boeing 737-200 (delivered new to the airline in 1970), which had an average age of 36.7 years, were scrapped in 2006 and replaced by more modern Boeing 737-300. In 2011, the airline inducted a Boeing 777-200ER that was wet-leased from EuroAtlantic Airways in order to continue operations into Europe due to a ban imposed on the airline's aircraft. The middle-age 777, though, was replaced with two Airbus A340-300 wet-leased from Air France from March 2012 till 2018 when a replacement aircraft is required (the wet leases have since been converted to one damp lease and one sublease of an operating lease).

=== Former fleet ===
As of August 2025, Madagascar Airlines operated 5 ATR 72-500, 1 ATR 72-600 and 3 De Havilland Canada DHC-6 Twin Otter.

Madagascar Airlines has also previously operated the following aircraft:

- Airbus A340-300
- Boeing 737-800
- DHC-8-Q400
- Boeing 767-300ER
- Boeing 777-200ER

== See also ==
- Airlines of Africa

== Bibliography ==
- Pénette, Jean Pierre; Lohau, Christine Pénette (2005). Le livre d'or de l'aviation malgache (in French). Jean Pierre Pénette. ISBN 2-9523646-0-5.
