= List of airports in Mauritius =

This is a list of airports in Mauritius, sorted by location.

== Airports ==
Airport names shown in bold indicate the airport has scheduled service on commercial airlines.

Location	District	ICAO	IATA	Airport name	Coordinates
Vingt Cinq	Agalega Islands	FIMA		Agalega Airstrip	10°22′27″S 56°36′29″E
Plaine Magnien	Grand Port	FIMP	MRU	**Sir Seewoosagur Ramgoolam International Airport** (Plaisance Int'l)	20°25′48″S 057°40′59″E
Plaine Corail	Rodrigues	FIMR	RRG	**Sir Gaëtan Duval Airport** (formerly Plaine Corail Airport)	19°45′27″S 063°21′39″E

== See also ==
- Transport in Mauritius
- List of airports by ICAO code: F#FI – Mauritius
- Wikipedia: WikiProject Aviation/Airline destination lists: Africa#Mauritius
