= Mon Tresor City =

Mon Trésor was a smart city planned by Omnicane in Plaine Magnien, Mauritius.

It was one of the first smart city projects in Mauritius. The project was originally proposed in 2015 and was located near Sir Seewoosagur Ramgoolam International Airport.

The project was sold off in 2022 due to the COVID-19 pandemic.
