= RRG =

RRG may be:

- Plaine Corail Airport, IATA code for the airport on the island of Rodrigues, Mauritius
- Reichs-Rundfunk-Gesellschaft, a network of German broadcasting companies
- Rhön-Rossitten Gesellschaft, a German gliding organization
- Role and Reference Grammar, a model of natural language grammar
- Rolls-Royce Ghost, a luxury saloon car
