= Int'Air Îles =

Defunct regional airline of the Comoros (2007–2024)

IATA	ICAO	Call sign
I7	IIA	INTER ILES
- Founded: 2007 (as Inter Îles Air)
- Ceased operations: February 2024
- Operating bases: Ouani Airport
- Alliance: Vanilla Alliance (2015–2024)
- Fleet size: 6
- Destinations: 7
- Key people: Seffoudine Inzoudine (Chairman); Ahmed Inzoudine (CEO)
- Website: www.inter-iles-air.com

Int'Air Îles was a regional airline based at Ouani Airport, Anjouan in the Comoros. It was founded in 2007 as Inter Îles Air and rebranded to its current name in March 2015. Using a fleet of six turboprop aircraft, the airline served all three islands of the Comoros, the French territory of Mayotte, Tanzania, and Madagascar. In February 2024, Int'Air Iles ceased operations.

Int'Air Îles is a founding member of the Vanilla Alliance, formed in September 2015 between several airlines based in the Indian Ocean.

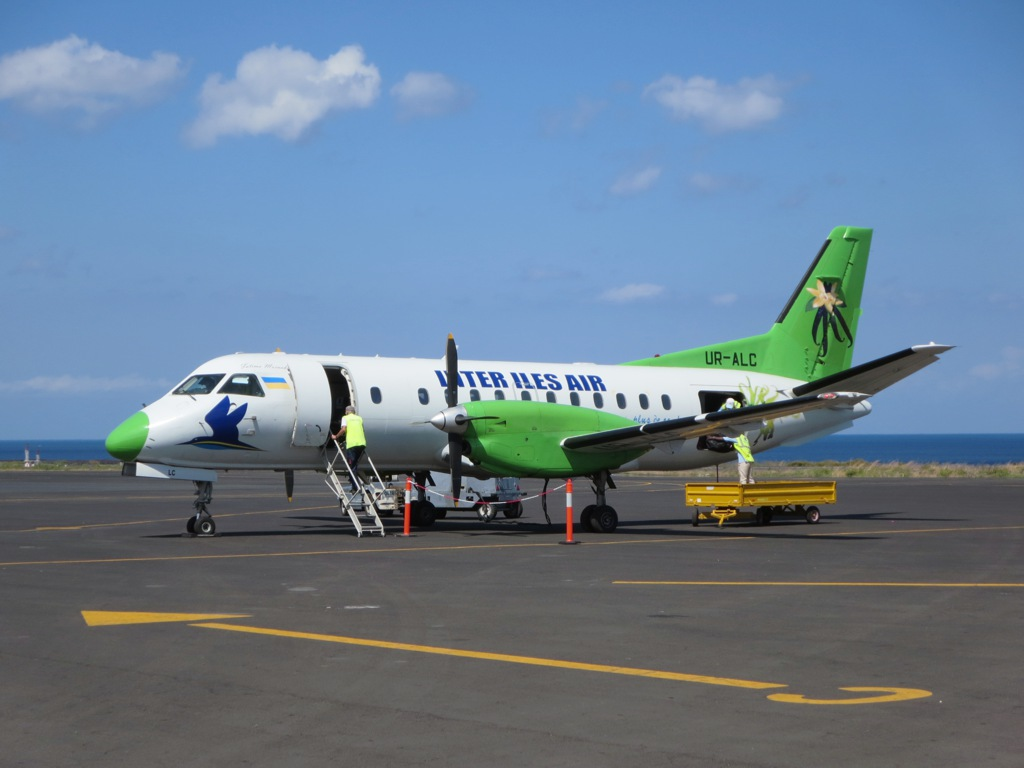
An Int'Air Îles Saab 340 at Moroni Airport in September 2013

== History ==
Int'Air Îles was founded in 2007 as Inter Îles Air. On 27 November 2012, the airline's sole Embraer 120 made a water landing shortly after takeoff from Moroni Airport; all 29 occupants of the aircraft were rescued. Inter Îles Air suspended operations until 18 May 2013, resuming flights with a new Saab 340.

In early November 2013, Inter Îles Air sided with Mahoran airline Ewa Air when the Comorian Government revoked the latter airline's traffic rights to Moroni. The two airlines jointly wrote a letter to the Comorian Ministry of Transport, urging it to return the rights. The dispute was resolved toward the end of the month. Traffic rights were returned to Ewa Air, and Inter Îles Air was permitted to resume flights to Dzaoudzi.

On 13 March 2015, the airline rebranded as Int'Air Îles and unveiled a new livery. On 22 June 2015, Ouani Airport in Anjouan required Int'Air Îles to pay an international tax on its flights from the airport to the French island of Mayotte, including 4 million Comorian francs in debt. The airline had previously been paying a domestic tax, eight times lower than the international tax. Ouani Airport said that if Int'Air Îles did not pay off the debt before 29 June, it would be banned from the airport. The airline refused to pay, citing the fact that the Comorian government considers Mayotte an island of the Comoros and thus a domestic destination; Int'Air Îles then suspended all operations. On 1 July the Ministry of Transport announced that Int'Air Îles had been charging higher prices for tickets to Mayotte than to the Comoros; thus they had to make up for it. An agreement was soon reached, with Int'Air Îles settling to pay its debts for April and May and agreeing to start paying the international tax. The airline resumed all flights on 14 July.

On 21 September 2015, Int'Air Îles became a founding member of the Vanilla Alliance, designed to foster cooperation between the airlines of the Indian Ocean and to improve air service in the region. The other founding airlines are Air Austral, Air Madagascar, Air Mauritius, and Air Seychelles.

In December 2016, the French DGCA banned Int'Air Îles from serving Saint-Pierre in Réunion, a French overseas region, because of its security concerns about the Moroni airport. French authorities stated that they would reconsider the ban after visiting the airport in January 2017 to assess the situation. The Comorian transport ministry responded with a ban on French airlines Air Austral and Ewa Air; however, it was rescinded following talks with French officials.

On 14 February 2024, the airline ceased operations and subsequently deregistered all its 54 aircraft on 1 May 2024, due to financial difficulties and problems with the Pratt & Whitney engines.

== Destinations ==
Int'Air Îles's website, accessed in January 2017, (Note: The webpage does not indicate when it was last updated.) states that the airline flew to the following destinations:

Country	City	Airport	Notes
Comoros	Anjouan	Ouani Airport	Hub
Comoros	Mohéli	Mohéli Bandar Es Eslam Airport	Terminated
Comoros	Moroni	Prince Said Ibrahim International Airport	Terminated
France	Dzaoudzi	Dzaoudzi–Pamandzi International Airport	Terminated
Madagascar	Antananarivo	Ivato International Airport	Terminated
Madagascar	Mahajanga	Amborovy Airport	Terminated
Tanzania	Dar es Salaam	Julius Nyerere International Airport	Terminated
United Arab Emirates	Dubai	Al Maktoum International Airport	Terminated

== Fleet ==
As of November 2015, Int'Air Îles operated two Cessna 208 Caravans, two Cessna 404 Titans and one Let L-410 Turbolet. In addition, ch-aviation reported in December 2016 that the airline had acquired a single Airbus A320-200. As of August 2019 the airline was operating a Saab 340B aircraft.

== Accidents and incidents ==
- On 27 November 2012, an Int'Air Îles Embraer 120 registered D6-HUA was forced to make a water landing five minutes after takeoff from Prince Said Ibrahim International Airport in Moroni. Destined for Ouani Airport in Anjouan, the aircraft suffered a fuel leak on takeoff and failed to return to Moroni. All 25 passengers and 4 crew members on board were rescued by local fishermen, and only the pilot suffered minor injuries. The aircraft was then written off, and Int'Air Îles suspended operations for over five months.

== See also ==
- List of airlines of the Comoros
- Transport in the Comoros
