= Airline alliance =

Cooperation agreement between two or more airlines

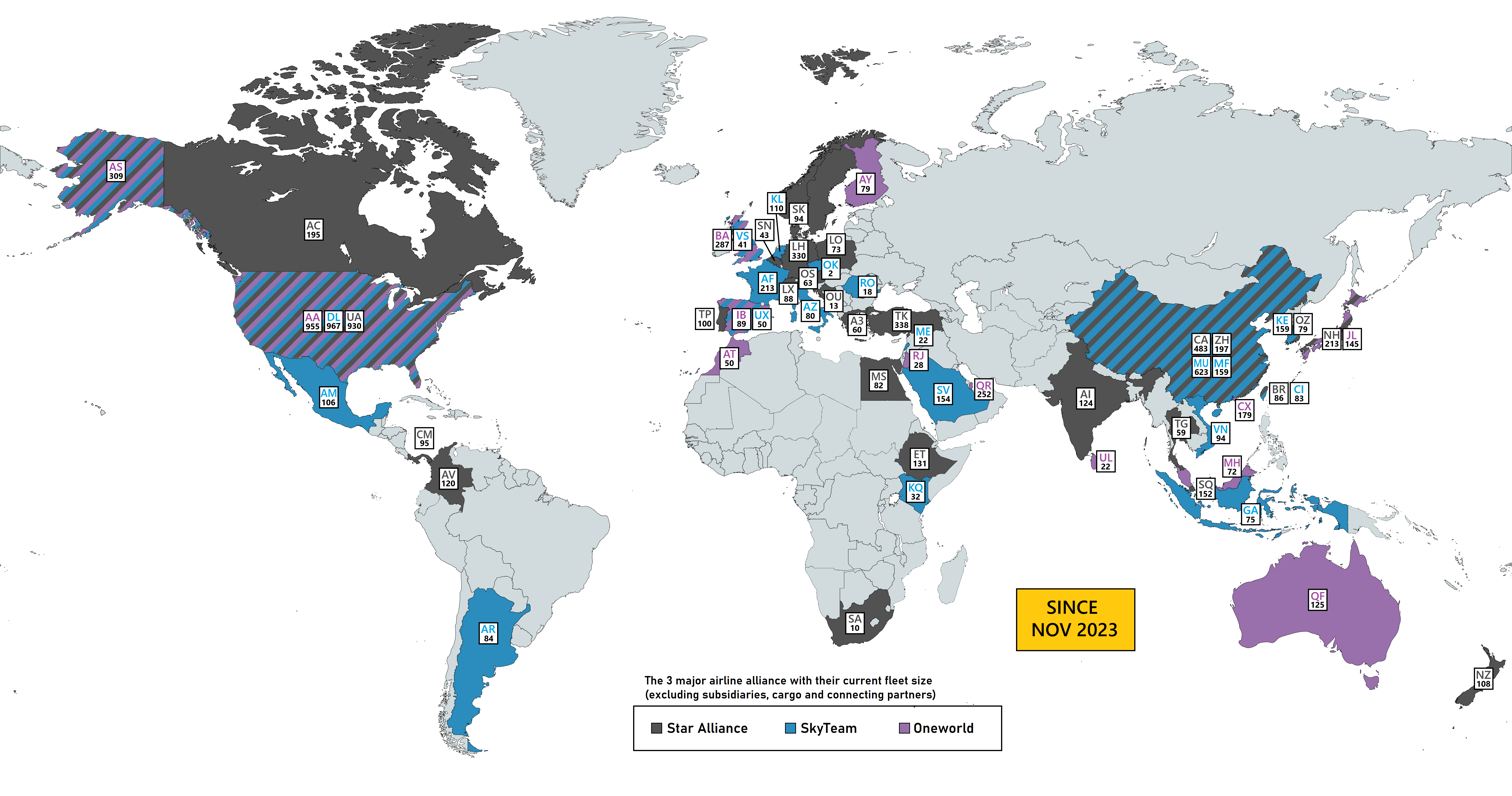
The three major airline alliances and the fleet size of their national carriers (excluding cargo and regional subsidiaries) as of November 2023

An airline alliance is an aviation industry arrangement between two or more airlines agreeing to cooperate on a substantial level. Alliances may provide marketing branding to facilitate travelers making inter-airline codeshare connections within countries. This branding may involve unified aircraft liveries of member aircraft.

In 2015, Star Alliance was the largest with 23% of total scheduled traffic in revenue passenger kilometres (RPKs)/revenue passenger miles (RPMs), followed by SkyTeam with 20.4% and Oneworld with 17.8%, leaving 38.8% for others. In 2019, by number of passengers, Star Alliance was leading 762 million, followed by SkyTeam (630 million) and Oneworld (535 million).

== Rationale ==
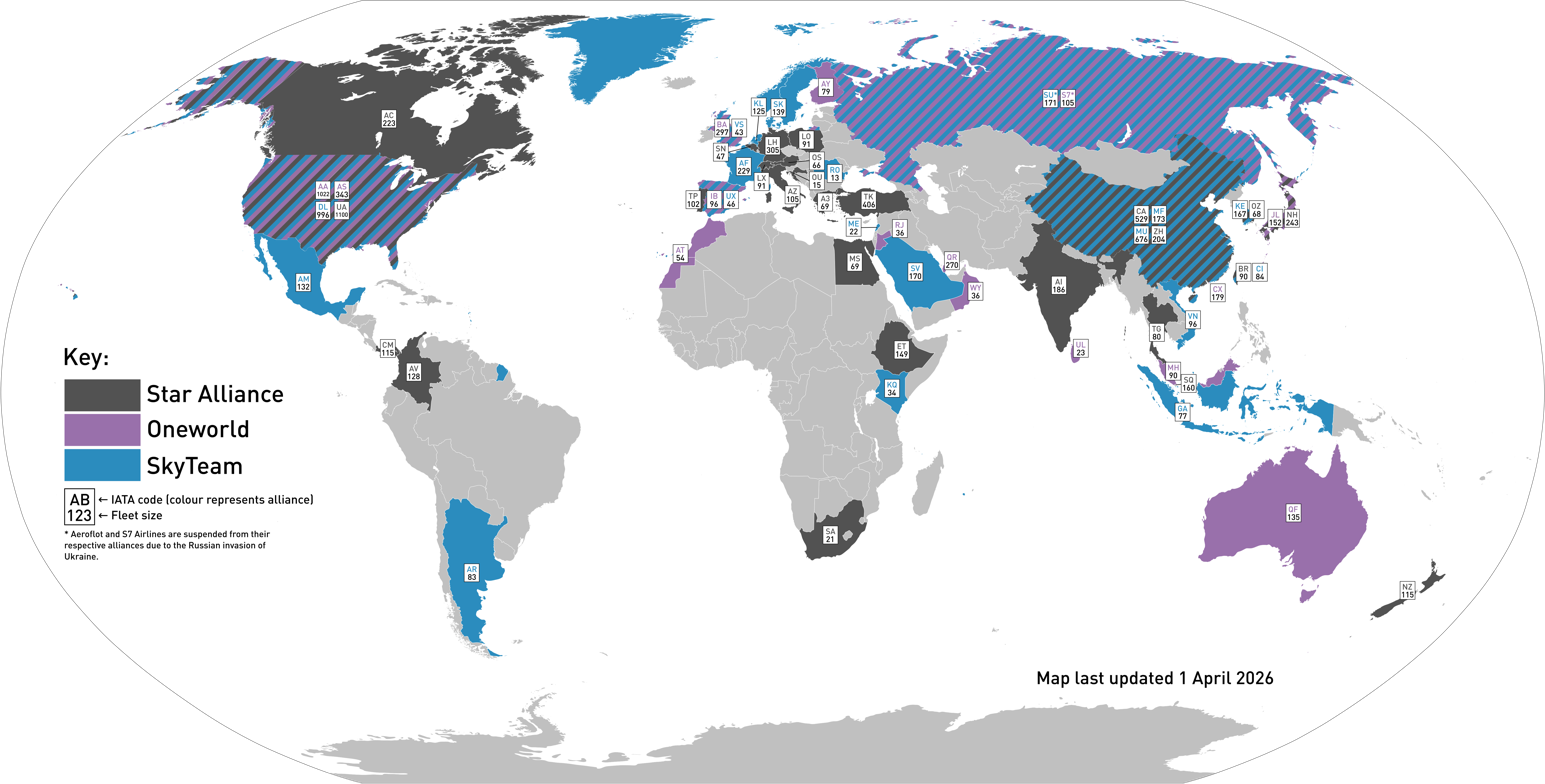
Alliance map as of April 2026

Benefits can consist of an extended network, often realised through codeshare agreements. Many alliances started as only codeshare networks. Cost reductions come from sharing operation facilities (e.g. catering or computer systems), operation staff (e.g. ground handling personnel, at check-in and boarding desks), investments and purchases (e.g. in order to negotiate extra volume discounts). Traveler benefits can include lower prices due to lowered operational costs for a given route, different times to choose from, more destinations within easy reach, shorter travel times, more options of airport lounges shared with alliance members, fast track access on all alliance members if having frequent-flyer status, faster mileage rewards by earning miles for a single account on several different carriers, round-the-world tickets, enabling travellers to fly over the world for a relatively low price.

Airline alliances may also create disadvantages for the traveller, such as higher prices when competition is erased on a certain route or less frequent flights; for instance, if two airlines separately fly three and two times a day respectively on a shared route, their alliance might fly less than 5 (3+2) times a day on the same route. This might be especially true between hub cities for each airline. e.g., flights between Detroit Metropolitan Wayne County Airport (a Delta Air Lines fortress hub) and Amsterdam Airport Schiphol (a KLM fortress hub).

== History ==
The first airline alliance was formed in the 1930s, when Panair do Brasil and its parent company Pan American World Airways agreed to exchange routes to Latin America.

The first large alliance began in 1989, when Northwest Airlines and KLM agreed to large-scale codesharing. In 1992, the Netherlands signed the first open skies agreement with the United States, in spite of objections from the European Union, which gave both countries unrestricted landing rights on the other's soil. Normally landing rights are granted for a fixed number of flights per week to a fixed destination. Each adjustment requires negotiations, often between governments rather than between the companies involved. In return, the United States granted antitrust immunity to the alliance between Northwest Airlines and KLM. This alliance continues to exist today (as of 2026) with KLM as a SkyTeam member and Northwest's successor airline Delta also being a member. Other alliances would struggle for years to overcome the transnational barriers and lack of antitrust immunity, and still do so.

On May 14, 1997, an agreement was announced forming the Star Alliance with five airlines on three continents: United Airlines, Scandinavian Airlines, Thai Airways International, Air Canada, and Lufthansa. The alliance chose Young & Rubicam for advertising, with a budget of $25 million (€18 million). which brought competing airlines to form Oneworld in 1999 and SkyTeam in 2000.

In 2010 Richard Branson, chairman of the Virgin Group, announced his intention to form a fourth alliance among Virgin-branded airlines (Virgin Atlantic; Virgin America; and the Virgin Australia Holdings group of airlines). Then, in September 2011, Branson said that Virgin Atlantic would join one of the existing alliances; this idea was repeated in October 2012. In December 2012, Delta Air Lines purchased Singapore Airlines' 49% stake in Virgin Atlantic for £224 million. Virgin America was absorbed into Alaska Airlines by 2018, which joined the Oneworld alliance in 2021. Meanwhile, Virgin Atlantic joined SkyTeam in 2023.

On February 14, 2013, it was announced that American Airlines and US Airways would merge, retaining the American Airlines name and would remain in the Oneworld alliance. US Airways' participation in Star Alliance lapsed. In 2012, in South America, LAN Airlines and TAM Airlines began their merger. In March 2014, with the merger complete, TAM left Star Alliance and became part of LAN in Oneworld.

On September 21, 2015, the Vanilla Alliance was formed between several airlines based in the Indian Ocean region to improve air connectivity within the region. The founding members were Air Austral, Air Mauritius, Air Madagascar, Air Seychelles, and Int'Air Îles.

U-FLY Alliance, the first alliance of low-cost carriers (LCCs), was formed in January 2016, comprising HK Express, Lucky Air, Urumqi Air, and West Air (all affiliated with HNA Group). In May 2016, the world's largest alliance of LCCs was formed, Value Alliance, including founding members Cebu Pacific, Cebgo, Jeju Air, Nok Air, NokScoot, Scoot, Tigerair, Tigerair Australia and Vanilla Air. Neither alliance remains active as of 2026.

== Current alliances ==
=== Star Alliance ===
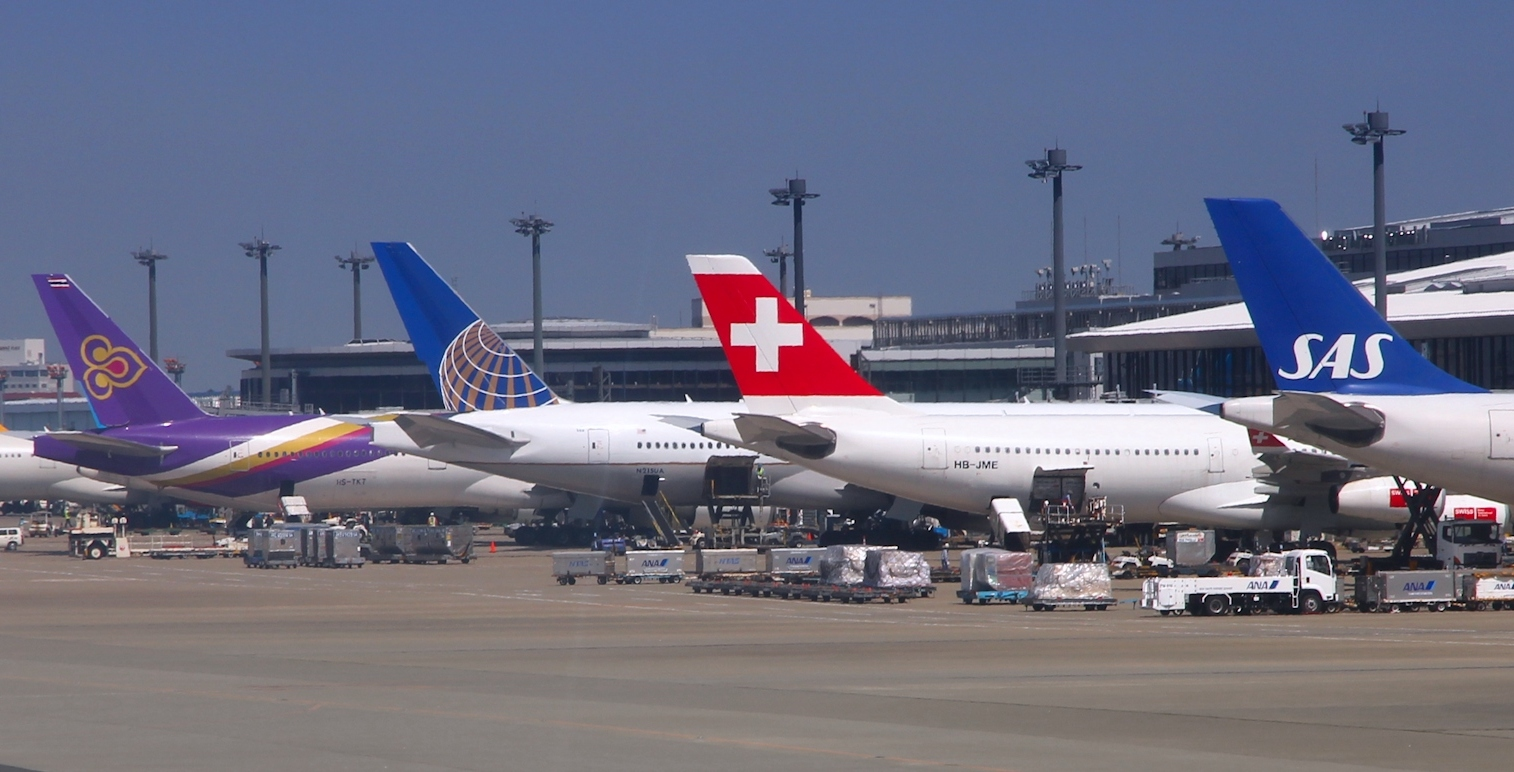
Three current members and one former member of Star Alliance at Tokyo Narita Airport Thai, United, Swiss and Scandinavian Airlines (SAS), the latter moved to SkyTeam in 2024

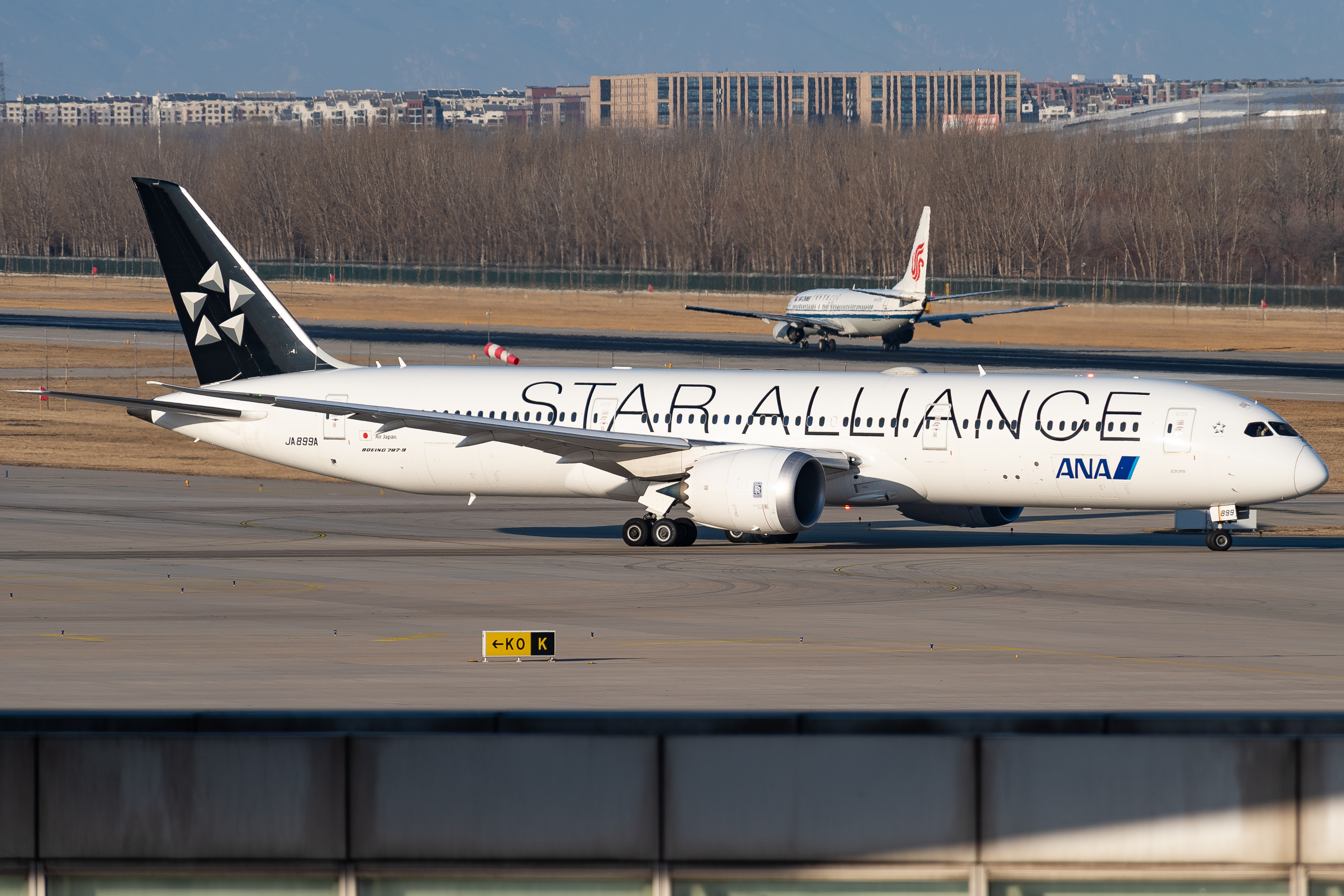
Boeing 787-9 of All Nippon Airways

Star Alliance, founded in 1997, currently has 26 members:

(Greece) Aegean Airlines, 2010
Air Canada, founder
Air China, 2007
Air India, 2014
Air New Zealand, 1999
(Japan) All Nippon Airways, 1999
(South Korea) Asiana Airlines, 2003
(Austria) Austrian Airlines, 2000
(Colombia) Avianca, 2012
(Belgium) Brussels Airlines, 2009
(Panama) Copa Airlines, 2012
Croatia Airlines, 2004
(Egypt) EgyptAir, 2008
(Ethiopia) Ethiopian Airlines, 2011
(Taiwan) EVA Air, 2013
(Italy) ITA Airways, 2026
(Poland) LOT Polish Airlines, 2003
(Germany) Lufthansa, founder
Shenzhen Airlines, 2012
Singapore Airlines, 2000
(South Africa) South African Airways, 2006
(Switzerland) Swiss International Air Lines, 2006
TAP Air Portugal, 2005
(Thailand) Thai Airways International, founder
(Turkey) Turkish Airlines, 2008
(United States) United Airlines, founder

Former members:

- (Slovenia) Adria Airways, 2004–2019, defunct
- Ansett Australia, 1999–2001, defunct
- (Finland) Blue1, 2004–2012, defunct
- (United Kingdom) BMI, 2000–2012, absorbed into British Airways
- (United States) Continental Airlines, 2009–2012, merged with United Airlines in 2012
- (Mexico) Mexicana de Aviación, 2000–2004, joined Oneworld in 2009
- (Denmark) (Norway) (Sweden) Scandinavian Airlines, founder, 1997–2024, joined SkyTeam in 2024
- Shanghai Airlines, 2007–2010, merged with China Eastern Airlines and joined SkyTeam as an affiliate of China Eastern in 2011
- (Spain) Spanair, 2003–2012, defunct
- (El Salvador) TACA, 2012–2013, merged with Avianca
- (Brazil) TAM Airlines, 2010–2014, merged with LAN Airlines and joined Oneworld in 2014
- (United States) US Airways, 2004–2014, joined Oneworld as an affiliate member of American Airlines and later merged completely with American in 2015
- (Brazil) Varig, 1997–2007, defunct

==== Star Alliance Connecting Partners ====
- (China) Juneyao Air, 2017

==== Star Alliance Intermodal Partnership ====
- (Germany) Deutsche Bahn, 2022
- (Austria) Austrian Federal Railways, 2025

=== SkyTeam ===
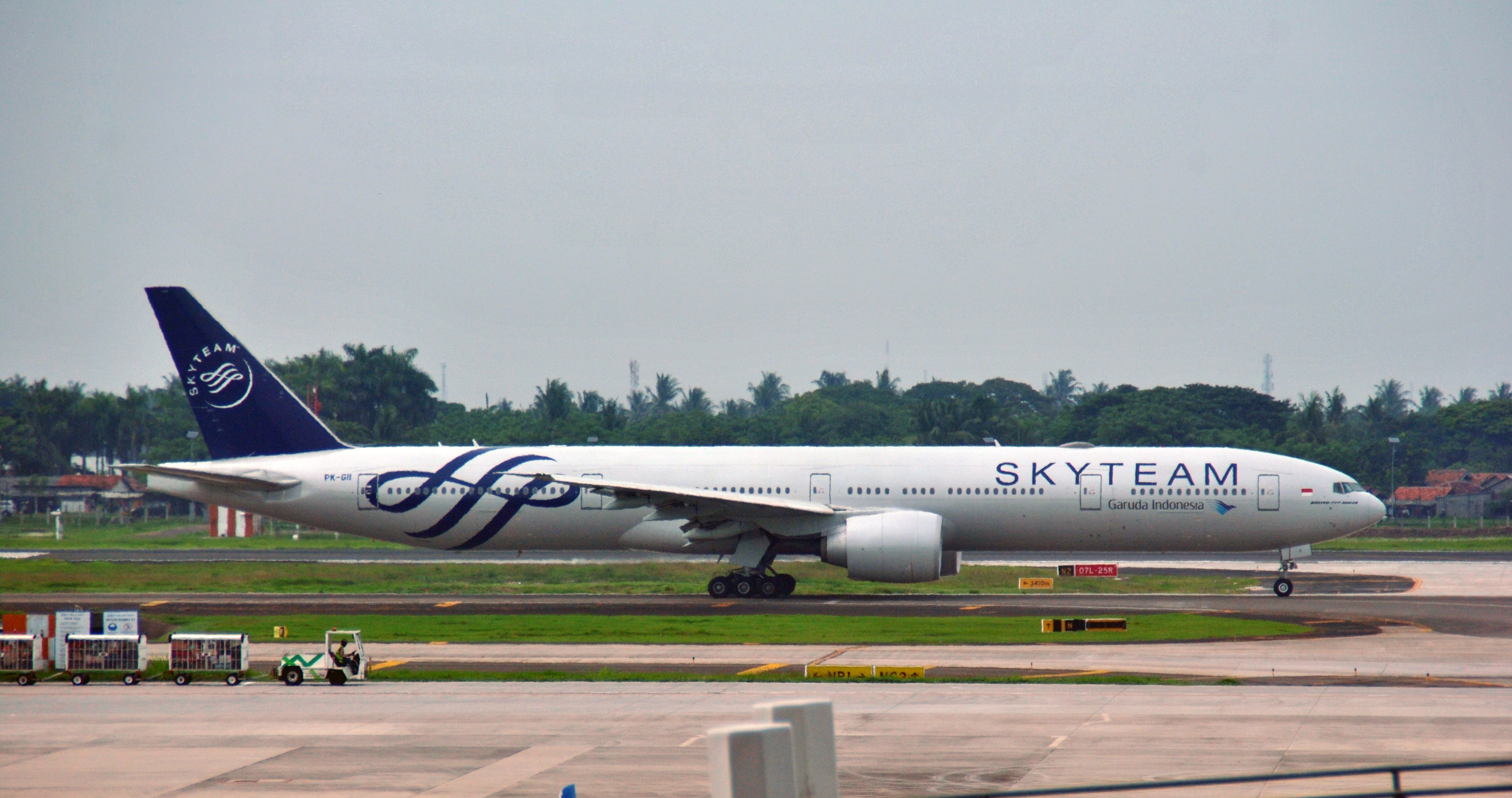
Boeing 777-300ER of Garuda Indonesia

SkyTeam, founded in 2000, currently has 18 members:

(Argentina) Aerolíneas Argentinas, 2012
(Mexico) Aeroméxico, founder
(Spain) Air Europa, 2007
Air France, founder
(Taiwan) China Airlines, 2011
China Eastern Airlines, 2011
(United States) Delta Air Lines, founder
Garuda Indonesia, 2014
Kenya Airways, 2007
(Netherlands) KLM Royal Dutch Airlines, 2004
(South Korea) Korean Air, founder
(Lebanon) Middle East Airlines, 2012
(Saudi Arabia) Saudia, 2012
(Denmark) (Norway) (Sweden) Scandinavian Airlines, 2024
(Romania) TAROM, 2010
Vietnam Airlines, 2010
(United Kingdom) Virgin Atlantic, 2023
XiamenAir, 2012

Former members:

- (Russia) Aeroflot, 2006–2022, suspended from alliance due to the Russian invasion of Ukraine
- (Italy) Alitalia, 2001–2021, defunct
- China Southern Airlines, 2007–2018
- (United States) Continental Airlines, 2004–2009, joined Star Alliance in 2009 and later merged with United Airlines in 2012
- (Panama) Copa Airlines, 2007–2009, joined Star Alliance in 2012
- (Czech Republic) Czech Airlines, 2001–2024, defunct
- (Italy) ITA Airways, 2021–2025, joined Star Alliance in 2026
- (United States) Northwest Airlines, 2004–2010, merged with Delta Air Lines in 2010

=== Oneworld ===
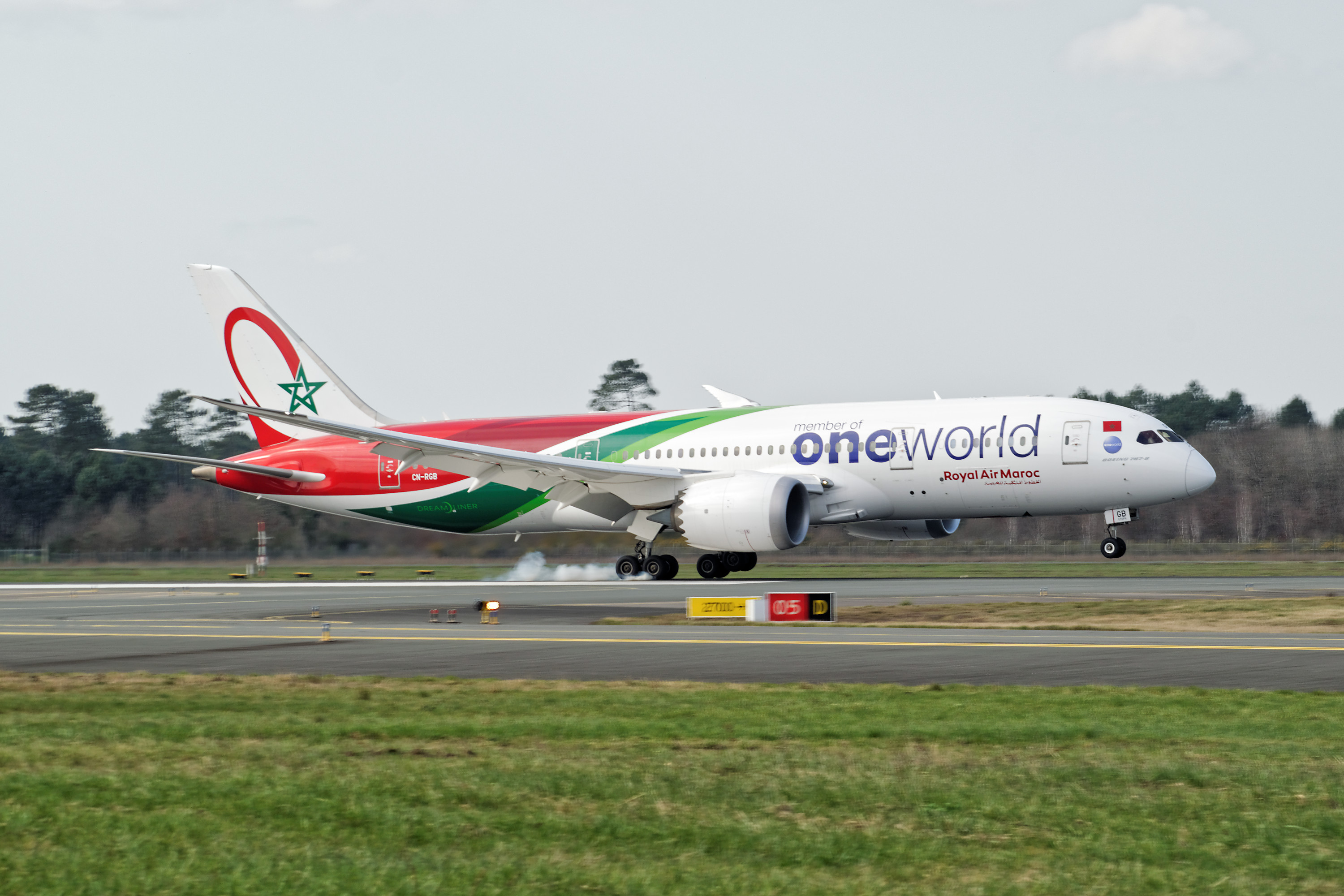
Royal Air Maroc Boeing 787-8

Oneworld, founded in 1999, currently has 16 members:

(United States) Alaska Airlines, 2021
(United States) American Airlines, founder
(United Kingdom) British Airways, founder
(Hong Kong) Cathay Pacific, founder
Fiji Airways, 2025
(Finland) Finnair, 1999
(United States) Hawaiian Airlines, 2026
(Spain) Iberia, 1999
Japan Airlines, 2007
Malaysia Airlines, 2013
Oman Air, 2025
(Australia) Qantas, founder
Qatar Airways, 2013
(Morocco) Royal Air Maroc, 2020
(Jordan) Royal Jordanian, 2007
(Sri Lanka) SriLankan Airlines, 2014

Future member:

(Philippines) Philippine Airlines, 2027

Former members:

- (Republic of Ireland) Aer Lingus, 2000–2007, left the alliance
- (Germany) Air Berlin, 2012–2017, defunct
- Canadian Airlines, founder, 1999–2000, acquired by Air Canada
- (Chile) LATAM Airlines, 2000–2020
- (Hungary) Malév Hungarian Airlines, 2007–2012, defunct
- (Mexico) Mexicana de Aviación, 2009–2010, defunct
- (Russia) S7 Airlines, 2010–2022, suspended from alliance due to the Russian invasion of Ukraine
- (Brazil) TAM Airlines, 2014–2016, rebranded itself to LATAM Brasil and became an affiliate of LATAM Airlines until LATAM left the alliance in 2020
- (United States) US Airways, 2014–2015, merged with American Airlines

=== Vanilla Alliance ===
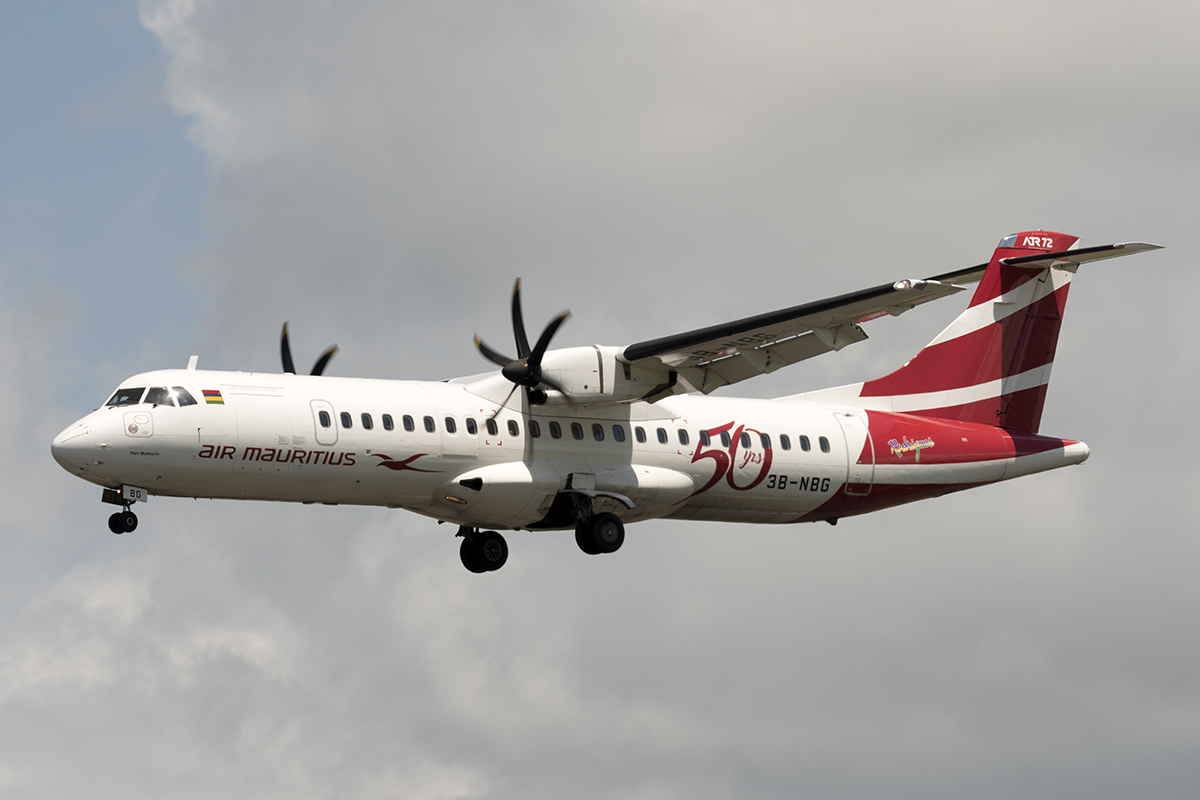
ATR 72-500 of Air Mauritius.

Vanilla Alliance, founded in 2015, currently has 4 members:

(Réunion) Air Austral, founder
Madagascar Airlines, founder
Air Mauritius, founder
Air Seychelles, founder

Former members:

(Comoros) Int'Air Îles, founder, 2015–2024, defunct

== Former alliances ==
=== U-FLY Alliance ===
U-FLY Alliance, founded in 2016, had 4 members:

(South Korea) Eastar Jet, 2016
(China) Lucky Air, founder
(China) Urumqi Air, founder
(China) West Air, founder

Former members:

- (Hong Kong) HK Express, 2016–2019, founder, acquired by Cathay Pacific in 2019 but still active as an own separate airline.

=== Value Alliance ===
Value Alliance, founded in 2016, had 5 members:

(Philippines) Cebu Pacific, founder
(Philippines) Cebgo, founder
(South Korea) Jeju Air, founder
(Thailand) Nok Air, founder
(Singapore) Scoot, founder

Former members:

- (Thailand) NokScoot, 2016–2020, defunct
- (Singapore) Tigerair, 2016–2017, merged with Scoot
- Tigerair Australia, 2016–2018, founder
- (Japan) Vanilla Air, 2016–2019, founder, merged with Peach Aviation

== Statistics ==
Alliance	Members	Passengers /year	Countries served	Destinations	Fleet	Employees	Revenue /year (US$)	Flights /day	RPK	
Star Alliance	26	642.1 Mn	195	1,360	5,000	432,603	179.05 Bn	19,000	1536 Bn	23%
SkyTeam	19	665.4 Mn	175	1,062	3,937	481,691	140.98 Bn	17,343	1362 Bn	20.4%
Oneworld	13	557.4 Mn	161	1,016	3,560	382,913	130.92 Bn	13,814	1189 Bn	17.8%
Value Alliance (defunct)	7	180 Mn	30	183	554	-	-	400	107 Bn	1.6%
U-FLY Alliance (defunct)	8	200 Mn	18	149	593	-	-	420	40 Bn	0.6%
Vanilla Alliance	5	2.3 Mn	26	89	46	-	-	-	-	

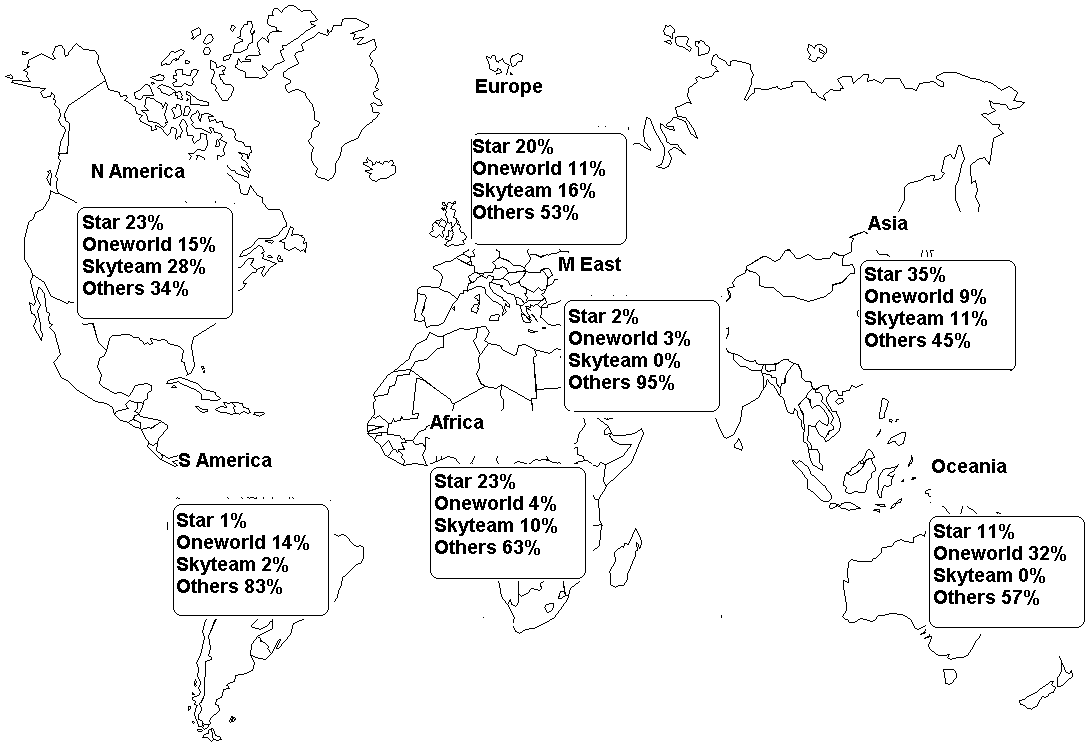
Airline alliance market share by network capacity 2007

== See also ==
- Codeshare agreement
- Interlining
