= Vanilla Islands =

Tourism cooperation and destination brand in the Indian Ocean

Logo of the Vanilla Islands

Vanilla Islands (French: Les Îles Vanille) is an affiliation of the islands of Seychelles, Madagascar, Réunion (France), Mauritius, Comoros and Mayotte (France) in the Indian Ocean formed as a joint travel destination brand. Founded on 4 August 2010 in La Réunion, the aim of the co-operation is to pool resources and market the region as a combined tourism destination, rather than market each island individually as was done previously; its name stemming from the historically significant cultivation of Vanilla beans amongst its member states.

Official communications also refer to the Vanilla Islands Association (Vanilla Islands Organisation) as the regional cooperation body behind the initiative. The association, headed by Pascal Viroleau of La Réunion, was established in October 2013 and is described as a joint platform promoting the region internationally.

== History ==
In January 2014, Seychelles Nation described the grouping as consisting of the Comoros, Madagascar, Mauritius, Mayotte, Réunion and Seychelles, with Alain St Ange as president and Pascal Viroleau as chief executive officer under the auspices of Taleb Rifai from the United Nations World Tourism Organisation.

== Cruise tourism ==
The strategies of the organisation increased the number of cruise passengers to the islands from 14,000 in 2014, to more than 60,000 in 2019. After the COVID-19 pandemic had ended, the sector resumed and became fruitful again. Cruise Industry News reported, citing a press release from the organisation, that more than 35 ship calls were expected across the region during the 2024–25 cruise season.

== See also ==
- Vanilla Alliance
