= Plaine Magnien =

- Village
- Location within Mauritius
- Coordinates: 20°25′43″S 57°39′11″E
- Country: Mauritius
- Districts: Grand Port District
- Elevation: 57 m (187 ft)

Population (2011)
  - Total: 10,443
- Time zone: UTC+4 (MUT)
- Area code: 230
- ISO 3166 code: MU
- Climate: Af

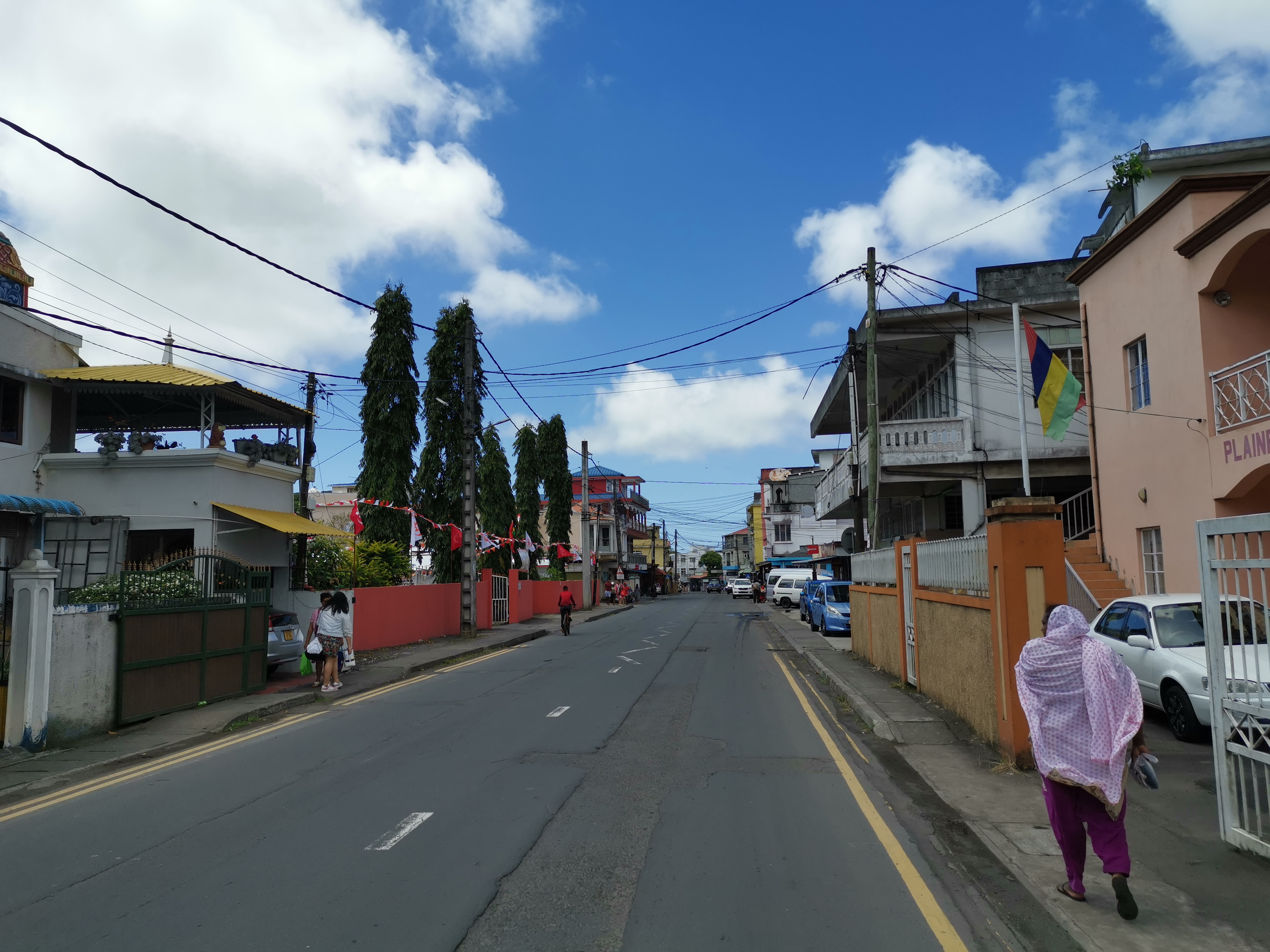
Street in Plaine Magnien

Plaine Magnien (formerly known as Plaisance) is a village in southeast Mauritius located in the Grand Port District.

== Landmarks ==
The main airport of Mauritius, Sir Seewoosagur Ramgoolam International Airport, is located in the village of Plaine Magnien.

In addition, it is the birthplace of the former Governor-General of Mauritius, Dayendranath Burrenchobay.

Plaine Magnien has an all-girls State Secondary School, France Boyer de la Giroday SSS.

Saint Esprit Prestige Store, one of the most popular retail store of the village, is on the main road near the Mauritius Commercial bank.

== Climate ==
Climate data for Plaine Magnien (Sir Seewoosagur Ramgoolam International Airport) (1991–2020)
| Month | Jan | Feb | Mar | Apr | May | Jun | Jul | Aug | Sep | Oct | Nov | Dec | Year |
|---|---|---|---|---|---|---|---|---|---|---|---|---|---|
| Record high °C (°F) | 34.4 (93.9) | 34.4 (93.9) | 33.4 (92.1) | 32.8 (91.0) | 31.3 (88.3) | 30.2 (86.4) | 29.0 (84.2) | 28.7 (83.7) | 28.7 (83.7) | 31.4 (88.5) | 32.8 (91.0) | 33.8 (92.8) | 34.4 (93.9) |
| Mean daily maximum °C (°F) | 30.2 (86.4) | 30.2 (86.4) | 29.6 (85.3) | 28.7 (83.7) | 27.2 (81.0) | 25.5 (77.9) | 24.6 (76.3) | 24.7 (76.5) | 25.5 (77.9) | 26.8 (80.2) | 28.3 (82.9) | 29.6 (85.3) | 27.6 (81.7) |
| Daily mean °C (°F) | 26.9 (80.4) | 26.9 (80.4) | 26.5 (79.7) | 25.7 (78.3) | 24.0 (75.2) | 22.6 (72.7) | 21.7 (71.1) | 21.7 (71.1) | 22.2 (72.0) | 23.2 (73.8) | 24.6 (76.3) | 26.1 (79.0) | 24.3 (75.7) |
| Mean daily minimum °C (°F) | 23.7 (74.7) | 23.9 (75.0) | 23.6 (74.5) | 22.7 (72.9) | 21.0 (69.8) | 19.6 (67.3) | 18.9 (66.0) | 18.8 (65.8) | 19.0 (66.2) | 20.1 (68.2) | 21.2 (70.2) | 22.8 (73.0) | 21.3 (70.3) |
| Record low °C (°F) | 18.0 (64.4) | 19.7 (67.5) | 18.4 (65.1) | 17.5 (63.5) | 14.9 (58.8) | 13.2 (55.8) | 11.9 (53.4) | 12.8 (55.0) | 13.5 (56.3) | 13.5 (56.3) | 13.4 (56.1) | 18.3 (64.9) | 11.9 (53.4) |
| Average precipitation mm (inches) | 231.3 (9.11) | 263.0 (10.35) | 243.4 (9.58) | 175.6 (6.91) | 115.5 (4.55) | 85.2 (3.35) | 85.8 (3.38) | 73.8 (2.91) | 62.2 (2.45) | 49.7 (1.96) | 75.6 (2.98) | 131.2 (5.17) | 1,592.3 (62.69) |
| Average precipitation days (≥ 1.0 mm) | 16.2 | 16.3 | 16.7 | 15.8 | 13.6 | 13.2 | 15.8 | 13.4 | 10.4 | 8.5 | 9.0 | 11.3 | 160.2 |
| Mean monthly sunshine hours | 233.2 | 201.7 | 209.9 | 197.7 | 193.2 | 170.1 | 164.9 | 184.6 | 203.3 | 235.0 | 251.6 | 253.0 | 2,498.3 |
Source: NOAA

== See also ==
- List of airports in Mauritius
- List of places in Mauritius
- Mon Tresor City
