= Air Mauritius =

National airline of Mauritius

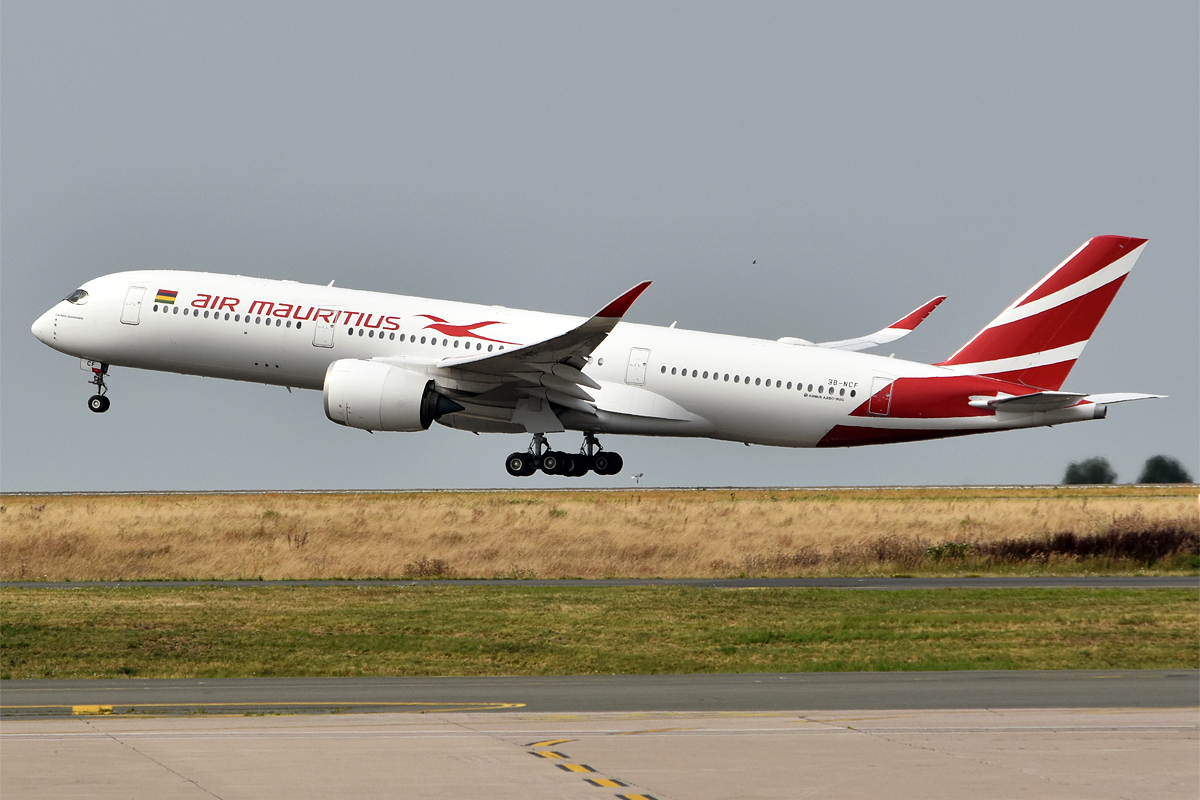
- Air Mauritius Airbus A350-900
IATA	ICAO	Call sign
MK	MAU	AIR MAURITIUS
- Founded: 14 June 1967; 59 years ago
- Commenced operations: August 1972; 54 years ago
- Hubs: Sir Seewoosagur Ramgoolam International Airport
- Frequent-flyer program: Kestrelflyer
- Alliance: Vanilla Alliance
- Subsidiaries: Airmate Ltd. (100%); Air Mauritius Holidays Ltd. (100%); Air Mauritius Holidays (Pty) Ltd. Australia (100%); Air Mauritius Institute Co. Ltd. (100%); Air Mauritius SA (Proprietary) Ltd. (100%); Mauritian Holidays Ltd. (UK) (100%); Mauritius Helicopters Ltd. (100%); Mauritius Estate Development Corporation Ltd. (93.7%); Pointe Coton Resort Hotel Company Ltd. (59.98%)
- Fleet size: 12
- Destinations: 14
- Parent company: Air Mauritius Holdings Ltd. (51%)
- Headquarters: Port Louis, Mauritius
- Key people: Kremchand Beegoo (Chair); Joseph Edouard Charles Cartier (CEO)
- Revenue: ▲EUR 499.8 million (FY2019)
- Operating income: ▲EUR 12.4 million (FY2019)
- Profit: ▲EUR +28.0 million (FY2019)
- Total assets: ▼EUR 360.5 million (FY2019)
- Total equity: ▲EUR 49.4 million (FY2019)
- Website: www.airmauritius.com

Air Mauritius is the flag carrier airline of Mauritius. The airline is headquartered in Port Louis, Mauritius, with its hub at Sir Seewoosagur Ramgoolam International Airport.

== History ==
=== Foundation ===
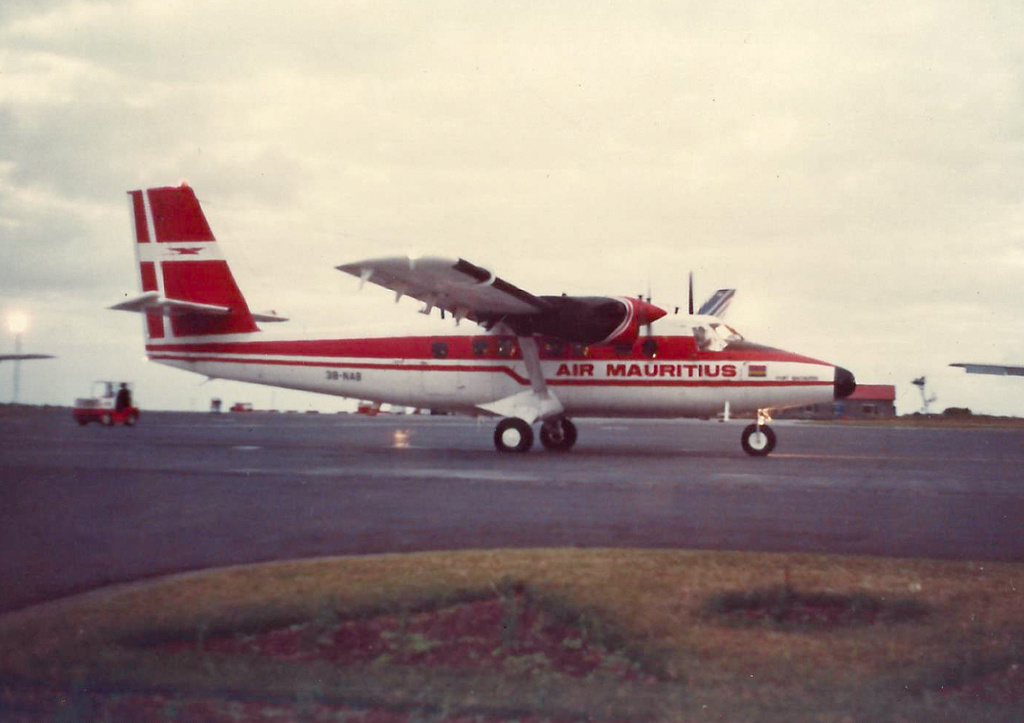
Air Mauritius Twin Otter at Sir Seewoosagur Ramgoolam International Airport

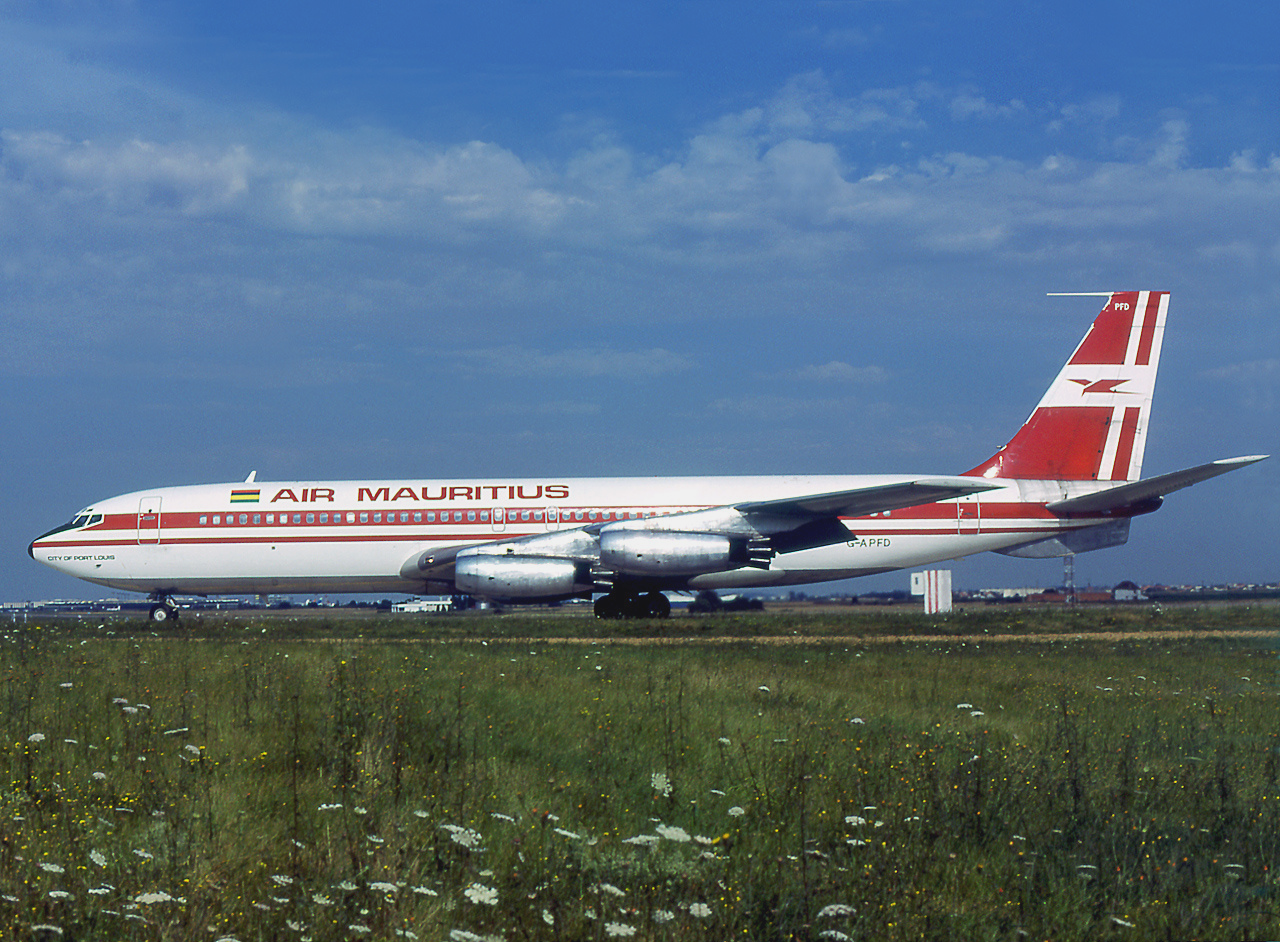
British Airtours Boeing 707 leased to Air Mauritius at Orly Airport in 1978

The company was established on 14 June 1967 by Air France, BOAC and the Government of Mauritius, with a 27.5% stake each; the balance was held by Rogers and Co, the general sales agent for Air France and BOAC in Mauritius.

In the beginning, the carrier operated international services in conjunction with Air France, Air India and British Airways, which jointly had a 25% holding in Air Mauritius at that time. Until 1972, the company restricted its activities to ground services only; it started flight operations in its own right in August 1972 with a six-seater Piper PA-31 Navajo aircraft leased from Air Madagascar, connecting Mauritius with Rodrigues. The aircraft wore an Air Mauritius decor, but kept a Malagasy registration.

In 1973, a wet-leased Vickers VC10 from British Airways enabled the company to launch a long-haul route to London via Nairobi, whereas services to Bombay were operated by Air India. The Navajo was replaced with a 16-seater Twin Otter that was acquired in 1975. When an agreement with Air France and British Airways came to an end, a Boeing 707-400 wet-leased from British Airtours helped the airline to start long-haul services in its own right. Long-range operations started on 1 November 1977. A second Twin Otter arrived in 1979.

=== Services expansion ===
By April 1980, the company had 414 employees and a fleet of one Boeing 707-420, one Boeing 737-200 and two Twin Otters to serve a route network of passenger and cargo services to Bombay, London, Nairobi, Réunion, Rodrigues, Rome and Tananarive. Ownership of the company had changed to have the Government of Mauritius as the major shareholder (42.5%), followed by Rogers & Co. (17.5%), Air France and British Airways (15% each) and Air India (10%). At July 1980, the carrier's network consisted of Bombay, London, Nairobi, Réunion, Rodrigues, Rome and Tananarive.

Air Mauritius acquired a second-hand Boeing 707-320B in 1981. It had previously belonged to South African Airways (SAA) and permitted the airline to return the Boeing 707-400 to British Airtours. In November 1981, a joint service between Air Mauritius and Air Madagascar began in the Tananarive–Mauritius–Comoros–Nairobi and Réunion–Mauritius runs, following the lease of an Air Madagascar Boeing 737. During the early 1980s, routes to Durban and Johannesburg were inaugurated using Boeing 707-320B aircraft flown with Air India and British Airways crews. The incorporation of a second aircraft of the type, bought from Luxavia, allowed the carrier to expand the European route network to Rome and Zürich in 1983, whereas Paris was added in the mid 1980s. Leased from SAA, a Boeing 747SP named "Chateau de Réduit" entered the fleet in November 1984 and was deployed on services to London.

By March 1985, the fleet comprised two Boeing 707-320Bs, a Boeing 737-200, a Boeing 747SP and a Twin Otter. That month, the first of two Bell 206 JetRangers was incorporated. In April, a 46-seater ATR 42 was ordered, and Singapore was added to the route network with a weekly service using Boeing 707 equipment. In June that year, Air Mauritius joined the African Airlines Association. The carrier made a profit of GBP3.5 million for the fiscal year 1985–86.

In 1986, a second Boeing 747SP that was also leased from SAA entered the fleet; it was named "Chateau Mon Plaisir". The incorporation of this aircraft allowed the carrier to phase out a Boeing 707. In 1987, South African Airways' landing rights on Australian soil were suspended by the Australian government and Qantas ceased its operations in South Africa. There had been an increase in demand from businessmen since that time, as most passengers travelling from South Africa to Australia had to stop at Hong Kong, Taipei or Singapore. Given that landing rights in Australia for Air Mauritius had not been approved yet, a Boeing 747SP non-stop service to Hong Kong commenced on 29 October 1989, in cooperation with Cathay Pacific. Flights to Kuala Lumpur had started in May 1988.

=== Fleet modernisation ===
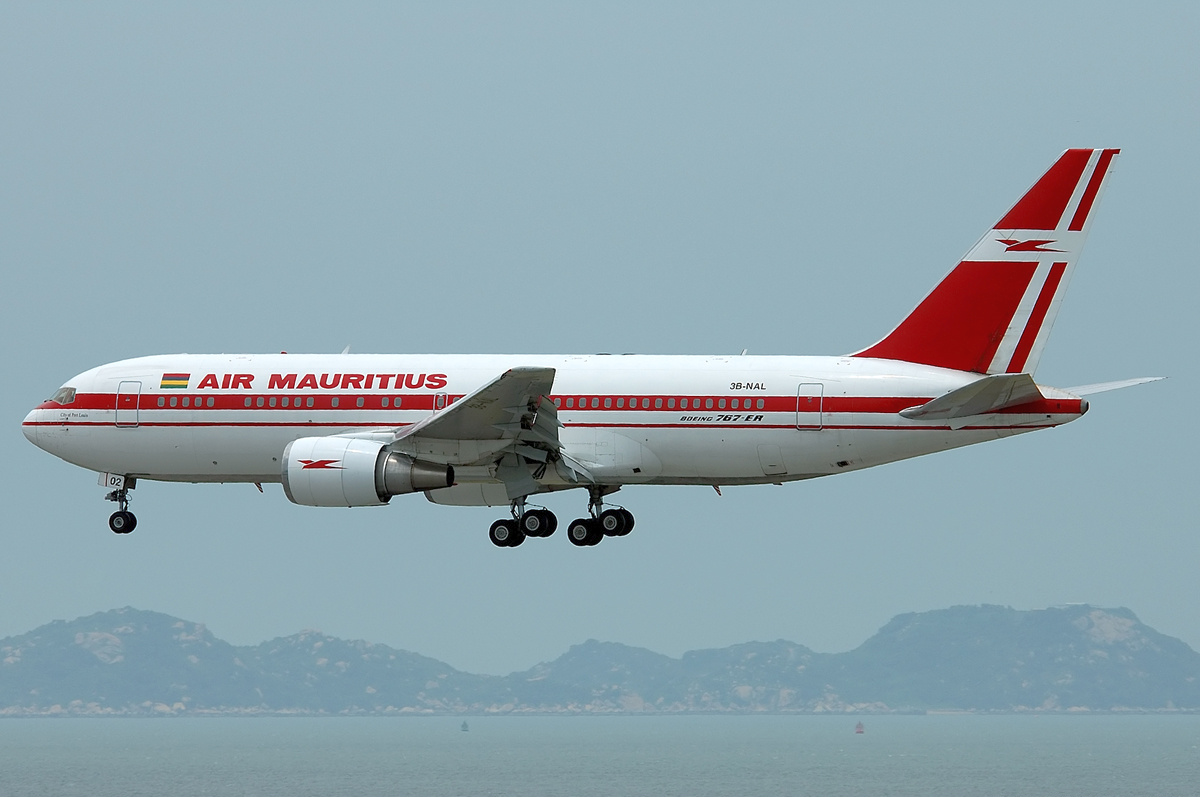
Air Mauritius Boeing 767-200ER in 2006. The airline received two aircraft of the type in April 1988.

Valued at US$122 million and financed by a group of banks that included Barclays, BNP, Crédit Lyonnais and the Spectrum Bank, the company took delivery of two Boeing 767-200ERs in April 1988. These aircraft were named "City of Port Louis" and "City of Curepipe". One of them set a record-breaking distance for commercial twinjets on 18 April 1988, when it flew non-stop from Halifax, Nova Scotia to Mauritius, covering a distance of almost 9,000 miles (14,000 km) in less than 17 hours. A contract worth US$8.9 million including spare parts for these two Boeing 767s had been signed a year earlier. Also in 1988, a Boeing 707 was leased from Air Swazi Cargo to operate freighter services, and the first ATR 42 started revenue flights in December, replacing the Twin Otters on inter-island services. A second ATR 42 was ordered in September 1989.

By March 1990, the route network included Antananarivo, Bombay, Durban, Geneva, Harare, Hong Kong, Johannesburg, Kuala Lumpur, London, Moroni, Munich, Nairobi, Paris, Reunion, Rodrigues, Rome, Singapore and Zürich. A new route to Perth was inaugurated in December 1991. Named "Paille en Queue" and leased from International Lease Finance Corporation (ILFC), the first Airbus A340-300 entered the fleet in May 1994; following delivery, a Boeing 747SP that was on lease from SAA was returned. The airline became the first in the Southern Hemisphere to fly the A340-300. A second A340-300, named "Pink Pigeon" and purchased directly from Airbus, was handed over by the aircraft manufacturer in October. Services to Brussels and Cape Town were launched in July and November of that year. Also leased from ILFC and named "Kestrel", Air Mauritius' third A340-300 joined the fleet in April 1995. The airline started trading on the Stock Exchange of Mauritius during the year. In 1996, the last Boeing 747SP was sold to Qatar Airways and direct flights to Manchester were launched.

=== 2000 onwards ===
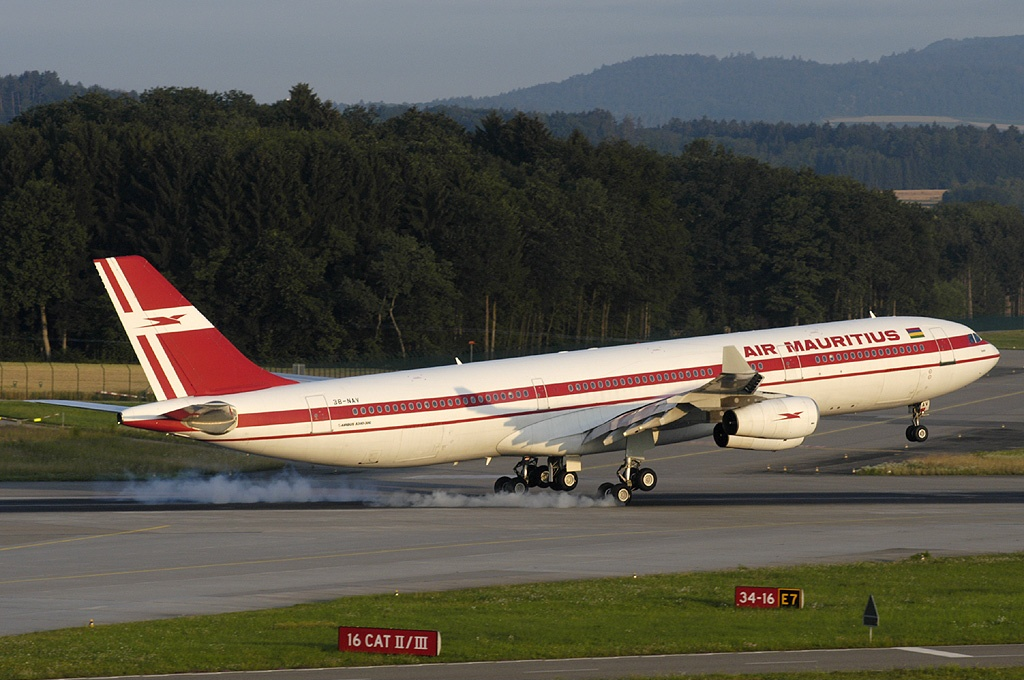
Air Mauritius Airbus A340-300 at Zürich Airport in 2004

At April 2000, Air Mauritius had 2,000 employees. At this time, the airline had a fleet of five Airbus A340-300s, one ATR 42-300, two ATR 42-500s, and two Boeing 767-200ERs that served a route network including Antananarivo, Brussels, Cape Town, Delhi, Durban, Frankfurt, Geneva, Harare, Hong Kong, Johannesburg, Kuala Lumpur, London, Mahe Island, Manchester, Maputo, Mauritius, Melbourne, Milan, Mumbai, Munich, Paris, Perth, Rodrigues Island, Rome, Singapore, Saint-Denis, Saint-Pierre, Vienna and Zürich.

African medium-haul routes started utilising the Airbus A319 following its delivery in 2001. The A340-300 was ordered by the carrier in mid 2005. The A340-300 Enhanced was put on service on the London Heathrow route in December 2006, soon after delivery. In late 2007, the fleet saw the incorporation of the Airbus A330-200; a second aircraft of the same type was delivered in October 2009.

Shanghai became the 26th destination served by the company in early July 2011. During 2012, the airline suspended its services to Frankfurt, Geneva, Melbourne, Milan and Sydney. At April 2013, the airline's five top routes in terms of available seats were Mauritius–Reunion, Mauritius–Paris, Mauritius–Johannesburg, Mauritius–Antananarivo and Mauritius–London; the biggest international markets served by the carrier in terms of seat capacity were Southern Africa and Western Europe.

In March 2016, Air Mauritius launched the 'Air Corridor' with its first direct flights to Singapore, which was previously served via Kuala Lumpur. The new route aimed at improving air connectivity between Mauritius and Singapore to stimulate the growth of passenger and cargo traffic between Asia and Africa through these two hubs.

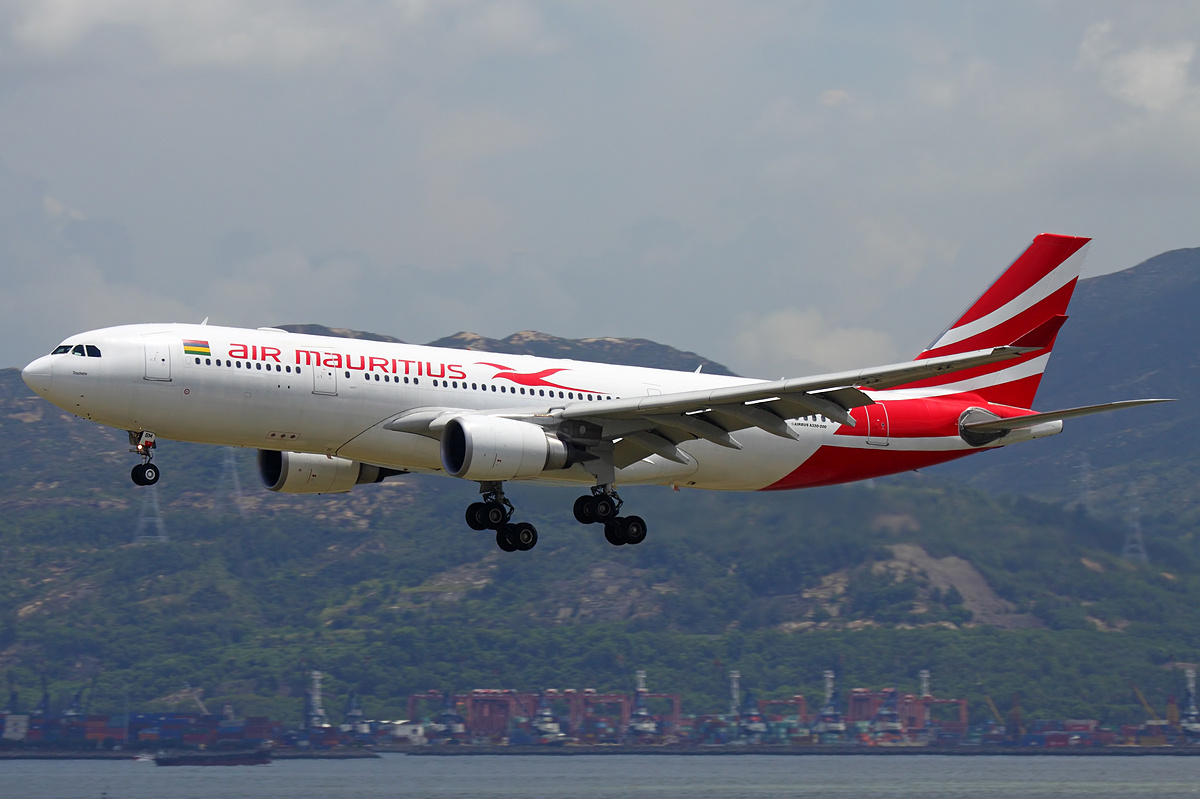
Air Mauritius Airbus A330-200 on short final to Hong Kong International Airport in 2012. The airline has the paille-en-queue, a fish-eating tropical bird, as its symbol. A stylised silhouette of this bird can be seen in the aircraft titles.

On 22 April 2020, the board of directors decided to place the company under voluntary administration after COVID-19 related disruptions made it impossible for the airline to meet its financial obligations for the foreseeable future. The pandemic had a major impact on the revenue of the company while it was seeking to change its business model to address existing financial problems. The company will continue its operation, this decision was taken to safeguard the interest of the company and its stakeholders. It exited administration in mid 2021.

== Corporate affairs ==
=== Key people ===
As of March 2019, Dev Manraj held the chairman position, and Buton Indradev was the officer in charge. Dev Manraj was a key figure in the MCB-NPF financial scandal which came to light in 2003. In December 2022, Krešimir Kučko, former Croatia Airlines and Gulf Air CEO, was appointed CEO of Air Mauritius. However, in September 2023, CEO Kučko and Chief Financial Officer (CFO) Laval Ah Chip were both stood down after an investigation which revealed that they had enjoyed free holidays paid for by a supplier of Air Mauritius. CEO Kučko was replaced by Charles Cartier in 2022.

In April 2025, the chair position was held by Kishore Beegoo. On 29 May 2025, Andre Viljoen was appointed as the new CEO with effect from 15 October 2025.

=== Ownership and subsidiaries ===
Air Mauritius was the first Mauritian company with its majority owned by the state that made its shares public. Listing was granted in November 1994 and share trading on the Stock Exchange of Mauritius commenced in February 1995. As of 31 March 2018, shareholders having more than 5% of direct participation in the airline were Air Mauritius Holdings Ltd. (51%) and the Government of Mauritius (8%), while other investors held the remaining stake. Air Mauritius Holdings Ltd. was in turn majority owned (44%) by the Mauritian Government.

=== Business trends ===
The key trends for Air Mauritius over recent years are shown below (as at year ending 31 March):

	2007	2008	2009	2010	2011	2012	2013	2014	2015	2016	2017	2018	2019
Turnover (EURm)	414.2	448.1	445.6	371.7	436.0	453.2	452.1	461.5	465.7	488.3	494.8	514.3	499.8
Net Profit (EURm)	-6.7	17.0	-85.5	-6.0	10.3	-29.4	-2.5	8.5	-22.9	16.5	26.9	4.9	-28.0
Number of passengers (000s)	1,177	1,311	1,192	1,133	1,295	1,325	1,297	1,330	1,370	1,499	1,603	1,695	1,724
Passenger load factor (%)	74.6	76.8	74.9	80.6	79.8	77.1	78.9	75.5	73.7	78.7	79.6	78.9	78.4
Number of aircraft (at year end)	12	12	12	12	12	12	12	12	12	13	13	15	12
Notes/sources													

=== Headquarters ===
As of March 2015, Air Mauritius had its headquarters at Air Mauritius Centre in Port Louis.

=== Controversies ===
==== Caisse Noire ====
Air Mauritius was the focus of a politico-financial scandal known as the Caisse Noire Affair. As a result of the investigation which lasted from 2001 to 2015, several senior members of its management including Gérard Tyack, Harry Tirvengadum and others were prosecuted. Tyack was jailed.

==== Complaints about CEO Cartier's family trip ====
Employees of Air Mauritius lodged official complaints in May 2024 with the Prime Minister's Office, ICAC about the approval process and discounts received by CEO Charles Cartier and six of his family members who were upgraded to Business Class during a trip to South Africa.

In their letter, these employees recalled that Cartier's predecessor Krešimir Kučko and his Chief Financial Officer, Laval Ah Chip, were stood down in 2023 after being investigated for benefitting from an all-expenses-paid stay in a hotel in France from a leasing company which also happened to be a key supplier of Air Mauritius. Krešimir Kučko was replaced by Charles Cartier after holding the position of CEO for only a few months.

==== Former CEO's claim for Rs 19.65 Millions ====
Following his dismissal in October 2016, the former CEO has been suing Air Mauritius, the most recent being his claim in 2024 for compensation of nearly Rs 20 million for sick leave, annual leave, bonuses and gratuities, although he only served as CEO for seven months with a monthly salary of Rs 0.75 million.

== Destinations ==
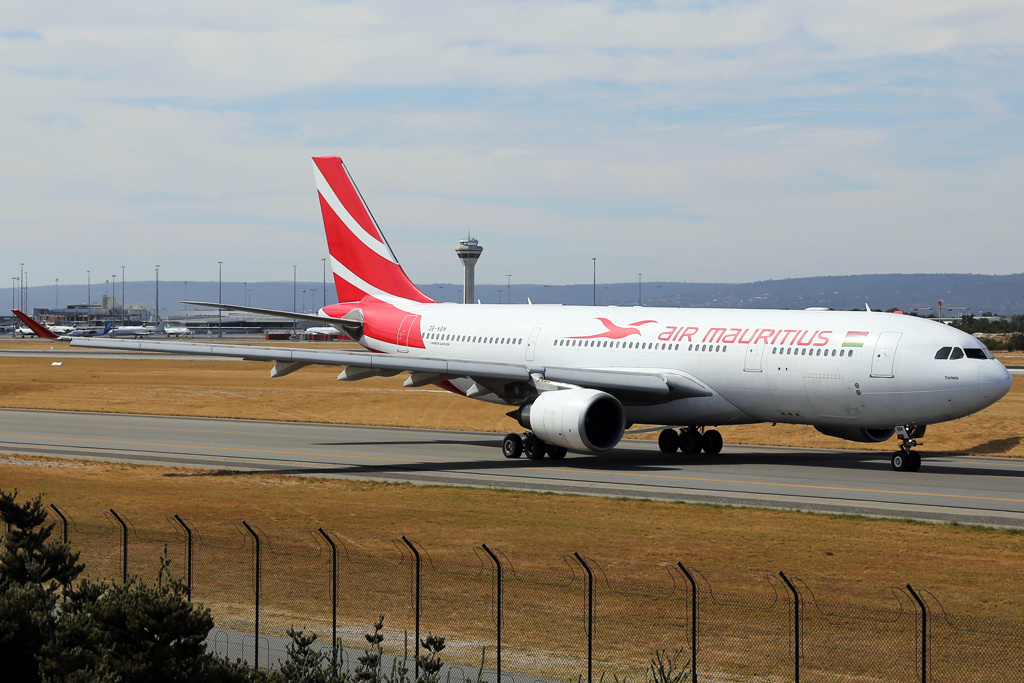
Air Mauritius Airbus A330-200 at Perth Airport in 2014

Following is a list of destinations Air Mauritius flies to according to their passenger scheduled services, as of October 2018. The table below provides each country served along with the destinations the airline flies to, as well as the name of the airports served. Terminated destinations are also listed.

Country	City	Airport	Notes	Refs
Australia	Melbourne	Melbourne Airport	Terminated	
Australia	Perth	Perth Airport		
Australia	Sydney	Sydney Airport	Terminated	
Austria	Vienna	Vienna International Airport	Terminated	
Belgium	Brussels	Brussels Airport	Terminated	
China	Beijing	Beijing Capital International Airport	Terminated	
China	Chengdu	Chengdu Shuangliu International Airport	Terminated	
China	Guangzhou	Guangzhou Baiyun International Airport	Terminated	
China	Shanghai	Shanghai Pudong International Airport	Terminated	
China	Wuhan	Wuhan Tianhe International Airport	Terminated	
Comoros	Moroni	Prince Said Ibrahim International Airport	Terminated	
France	Paris	Charles de Gaulle Airport		
Germany	Frankfurt	Frankfurt Airport	Terminated	
Germany	Munich	Munich Airport	Terminated	
Hong Kong	Hong Kong	Hong Kong International Airport	Terminated	
India	Bengaluru	Kempegowda International Airport	Terminated	
India	Chennai	Chennai International Airport		
India	Delhi	Indira Gandhi International Airport		
India	Mumbai	Chhatrapati Shivaji Maharaj International Airport		
Indonesia	Jakarta	Soekarno–Hatta International Airport	Terminated	
Italy	Milan	Milan Malpensa Airport	Terminated	
Italy	Rome	Rome Fiumicino Airport	Terminated	
Kenya	Nairobi	Jomo Kenyatta International Airport	Terminated	
Madagascar	Antananarivo	Ivato International Airport		
Malaysia	Kuala Lumpur	Kuala Lumpur International Airport		
Mauritius	Port Louis	Sir Seewoosagur Ramgoolam International Airport	Hub	
Mauritius	Rodrigues	Sir Gaëtan Duval Airport		
Mozambique	Maputo	Maputo International Airport	Terminated	
Nigeria	Lagos	Murtala Muhammed International Airport	Terminated	
Netherlands	Amsterdam	Amsterdam Airport Schiphol	Terminated	
Réunion	Saint-Denis	Roland Garros Airport		
Réunion	Saint-Pierre	Saint-Pierre Pierrefonds Airport	Terminated	
Seychelles	Mahé	Seychelles International Airport	Terminated	
Singapore	Singapore	Changi Airport	Terminated	
South Africa	Cape Town	Cape Town International Airport		
South Africa	Durban	King Shaka International Airport	Terminated	
South Africa	Johannesburg	O. R. Tambo International Airport		
Switzerland	Geneva	Geneva Airport	Seasonal	
Switzerland	Zurich	Zurich Airport	Terminated	
United Kingdom	London	Gatwick Airport		
United Kingdom	London	Heathrow Airport	Terminated	
United Kingdom	Manchester	Manchester Airport	Terminated	
Zimbabwe	Harare	Robert Gabriel Mugabe International Airport	Terminated	

In September 2015, the carrier signed a cooperation agreement with Air Austral, Air Madagascar, Air Seychelles and Int'Air Îles that established the Vanilla Alliance and is aimed at improving air services between the Indian Ocean Commission members.

As of October 2018, Air Mauritius served 22 destinations from its hub in Sir Seewoosagur Ramgoolam International Airport, two of them domestic.

=== Codeshare agreements ===
Air Mauritius has codeshare agreements with the following airlines:

- Air Austral
- Air France
- Air India
- Emirates
- Hong Kong Airlines
- Kenya Airways
- KLM
- Madagascar Airlines
- Malaysia Airlines
- Saudia
- Singapore Airlines
- South African Airways
- TUI Airways
- Virgin Australia

=== Frequent flyer programme ===
Air Mauritius' frequent flyer programme is called Kestrelflyer, which offers Silver and Gold accounts.

== Fleet ==
=== Recent developments and future plans ===
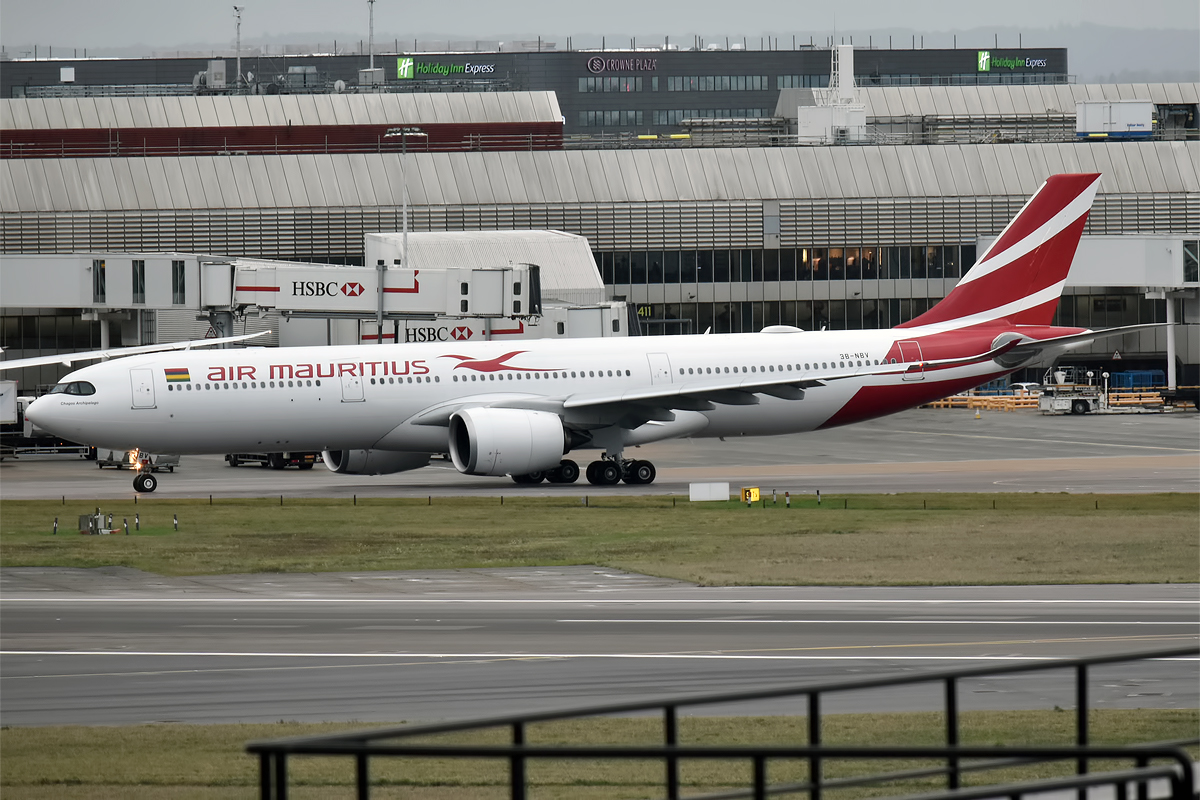
Airbus A330-900 in October 2019

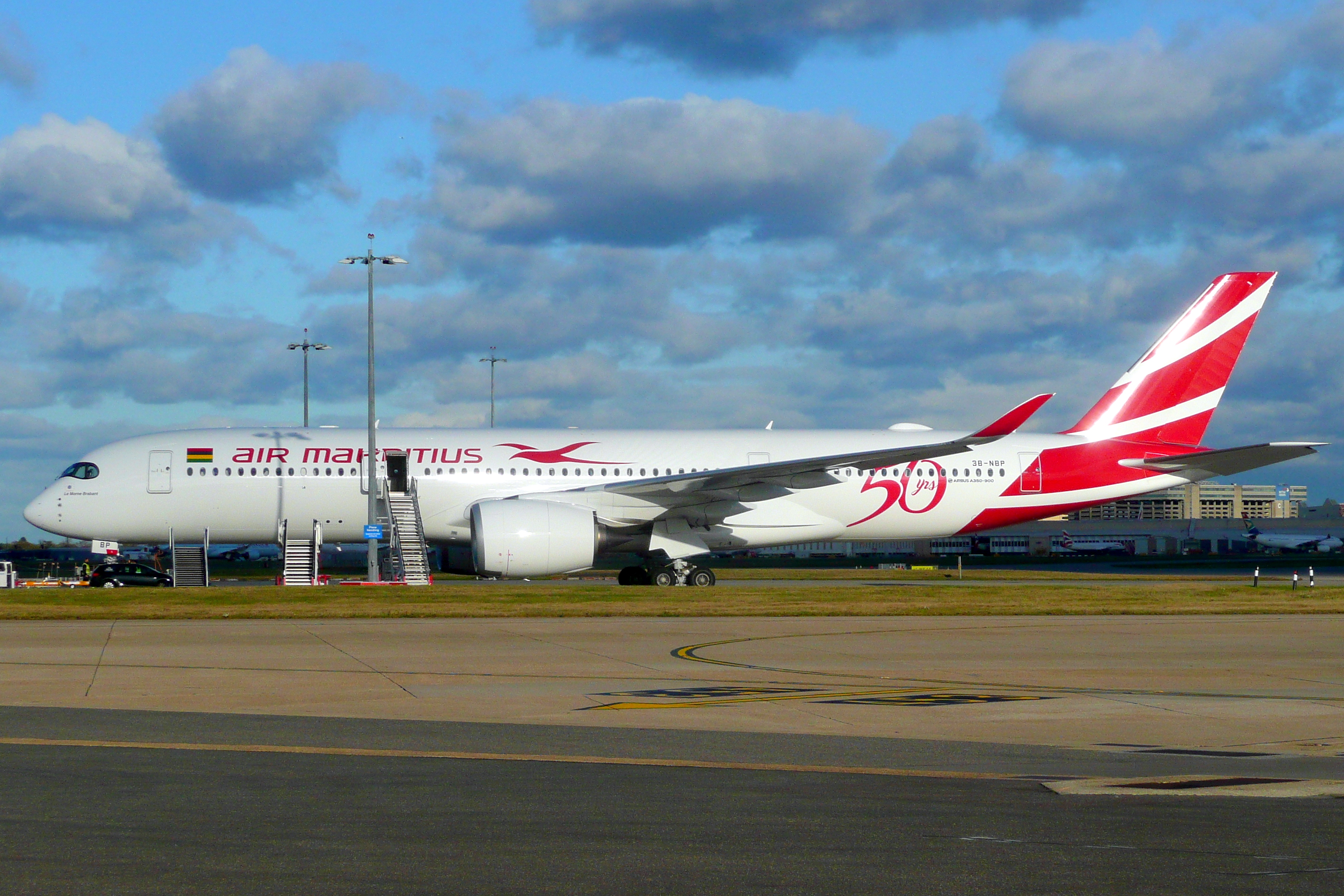
Airbus A350-900 in 2017

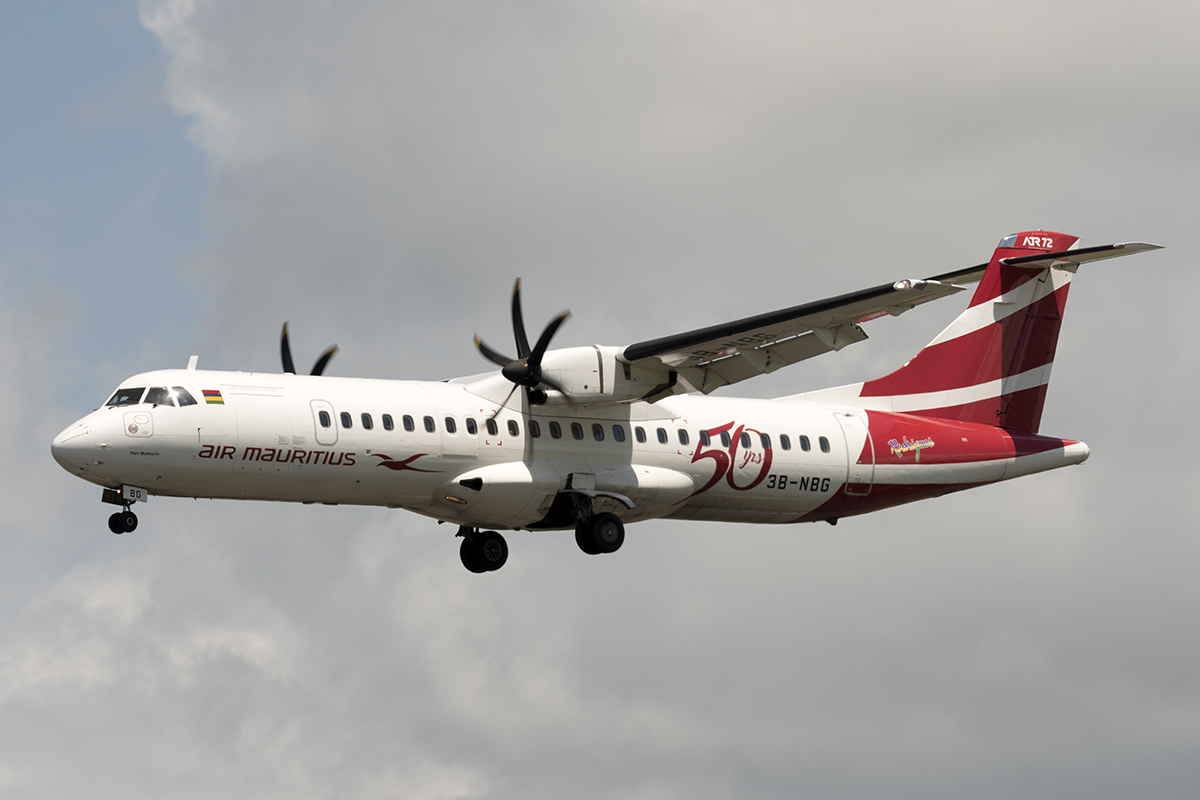
ATR 72-500 wearing the airline's 50th anniversary livery in March 2018

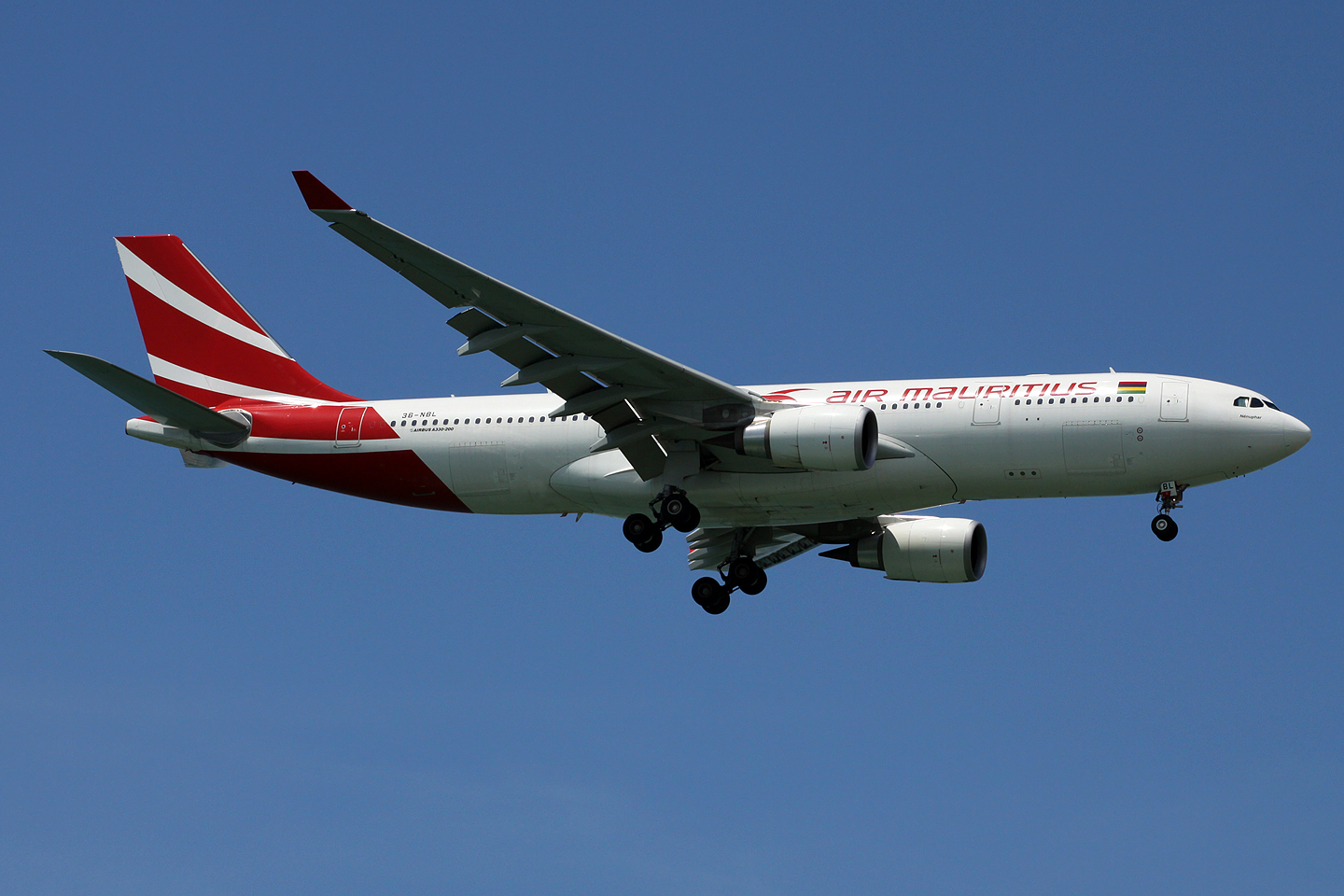
Former Airbus A330-200 in 2010

In July 2014, during the Farnborough Air Show, it was announced Air Mauritius signed a memorandum of understanding with Airbus for six Airbus A350-900s, of which two would be leased from AerCap and with the option to place additional orders for up to three more aircraft of the type between 2023 and 2025. It was originally planned that the leased aircraft would join the fleet by the end of 2017 and the other four would join in 2019 and 2020.

In February 2017, Air Mauritius announced that it would be leasing two Airbus A330-900 aircraft from Air Lease Corporation to replace two Airbus A340-300E aircraft from September and October 2018. Due to delays from Airbus, these aircraft were delivered in April and June 2019. The two Airbus A350-900 that were due to be delivered in 2020, were pushed back to 2023. It was also announced that the airline's existing aircraft would be refurbished with new seats, new inflight entertainment systems and onboard Wi-Fi. The revamp of the cabin interiors was planned to be completed by June 2018. The two Airbus A350-900s that were due to join the fleet in 2019 were sublet to South African Airways for three years. In August 2020, these aircraft were returned early by SAA, due to financial difficulties.

In July 2021, the airline completed the sale of its two Airbus A319 and remaining Airbus A340 aircraft. The retirement of the Airbus A340 marked the end of 27 years of service of the fleet type with the airline. The retirement of the two Airbus A330-200 from the fleet was completed by end of November 2021.

On 19 June 2023, Air Mauritius announced that it confirmed an order for three Airbus A350-900, an increase of one plane from the original 2014 order. The aircraft are expected to be delivered between 2025 and 2026.

=== Current fleet ===
As of August 2025, Air Mauritius operates the following aircraft:

Air Mauritius fleet
Aircraft	In fleet	Orders	Passengers			Notes
Aircraft	In fleet	Orders	J	Y	Total	Notes
Airbus A330-200	2	—	18	236	254	Leased for 3 year period from Carlyle Aviation Partners.
Airbus A330-900	2	—	28	260	288	
Airbus A350-900	4	3	28	298	326	
ATR 72-500	2	—	—	72	72	To be replaced by ATR 72-600.
ATR 72-600	2	1	—	72	72	Deliveries until September to replace ATR 72-500.
Total	12	4				

Air Mauritius also operates two Bell 206 JetRanger helicopters that are used for tour services.

=== Former fleet ===
In the past, Air Mauritius has operated the following aircraft:

- Airbus A319-100
- Airbus A340-300
- ATR 42-300
- ATR 42-500
- Boeing 707-320B
- Boeing 707-420
- Boeing 737-200
- Boeing 747SP
- Boeing 747-200B
- Boeing 767-200ER
- Boeing 767-300ER
- de Havilland Canada DHC-6 Twin Otter
- Lockheed L-1011-500

== See also ==
- List of airlines of Mauritius
- List of defunct airlines of Mauritius
- Transport in Mauritius

== Bibliography ==
- Guttery, Ben R. (1998). Encyclopedia of African Airlines. Jefferson, NC: McFarland & Company. ISBN 0-7864-0495-7.
