= Vanilla Alliance =

Airline alliance

- Launch date: 21 September 2015; 11 years ago
- Full members: 4
- Destination airports: 89
- Destination countries: 26
- Annual passengers (M): 2.3
- Fleet size: 32
- Management: Marie-Joseph Malé, president

The Vanilla Alliance (French: Alliance Vanille) is an airline alliance formed in September 2015. All of the airlines within the alliance operate in the Indian Ocean region and are based in sovereign states that are members of the Indian Ocean Commission or French overseas territories in the Indian Ocean. The alliance is the fourth largest in the world as of 2025, trailing Oneworld, Star Alliance, and SkyTeam.

== History ==
In August 2010, Seychelles, Mauritius, Madagascar, the Comoros, Réunion, and Mayotte united under the brand "Vanilla Islands" under the leadership of Pascal Viroleau to promote tourism to the entire region. In 2012, the Maldives Minister for Tourism was invited to discuss joining as a member of the Vanilla Islands tourism body. But after a meeting of ministers in 2016, the organization confirmed that the Maldives was not a member of the group. It is noteworthy that there are no direct flights between Velana International Airport in the Maldives, and any of the member islands. The initial goals of the Vanilla Alliance include increased air service between the islands, more attractive fares, and optimization of codesharing. L'Estrac also suggested the creation of a new low-cost regional airline to attract more tourists. Ultimately, the alliance wishes to increase tourism, trade, and business ties in the region. The founding members are Air Austral, Air Madagascar, Air Mauritius, Air Seychelles and Int'Air Îles.

In 2012 the Indian Ocean Commission (IOC) hosted a conference on the state of air travel within the Indian Ocean region. It was determined that the current business model of the airlines was unsustainable and that ticket prices for regional air travel were too high, compared to intra-Europe and intra-Caribbean fares.

From 2–3 May 2013, the IOC held another conference in Mauritius on the problems with regional air travel. In January 2014, the Commission published a plea entitled "Wings of the Indian Ocean", in which it called for a joint strategy on regional air transport and noted the economic benefits it would have. The IOC held another conference in July 2014 on tourism and air travel, after which a committee of airline officials and another of civil aviation authorities were created to form the alliance.

On 20 May 2015, the Council of Ministers of the IOC met in Antananarivo to commit to signing an agreement for the creation of the alliance. The airlines were expected to sign it on 18 June, however this date was postponed due to a strike at Air Madagascar.

On 21 September 2015, founding airlines Air Austral, Air Madagascar, Air Mauritius, Air Seychelles and Int'Air Îles signed the pact in Antananarivo. The signing was attended by Secretary General Jean-Claude de l'Estrac of the Indian Ocean Commission and Malagasy president Hery Rajaonarimampianina.

On 14 February 2024, Int'Air Îles ceased operations due to financial difficulties and problems with the Pratt & Whitney engines, therefore leaving the Vanilla Alliance.

== Member airlines ==
=== Full members ===
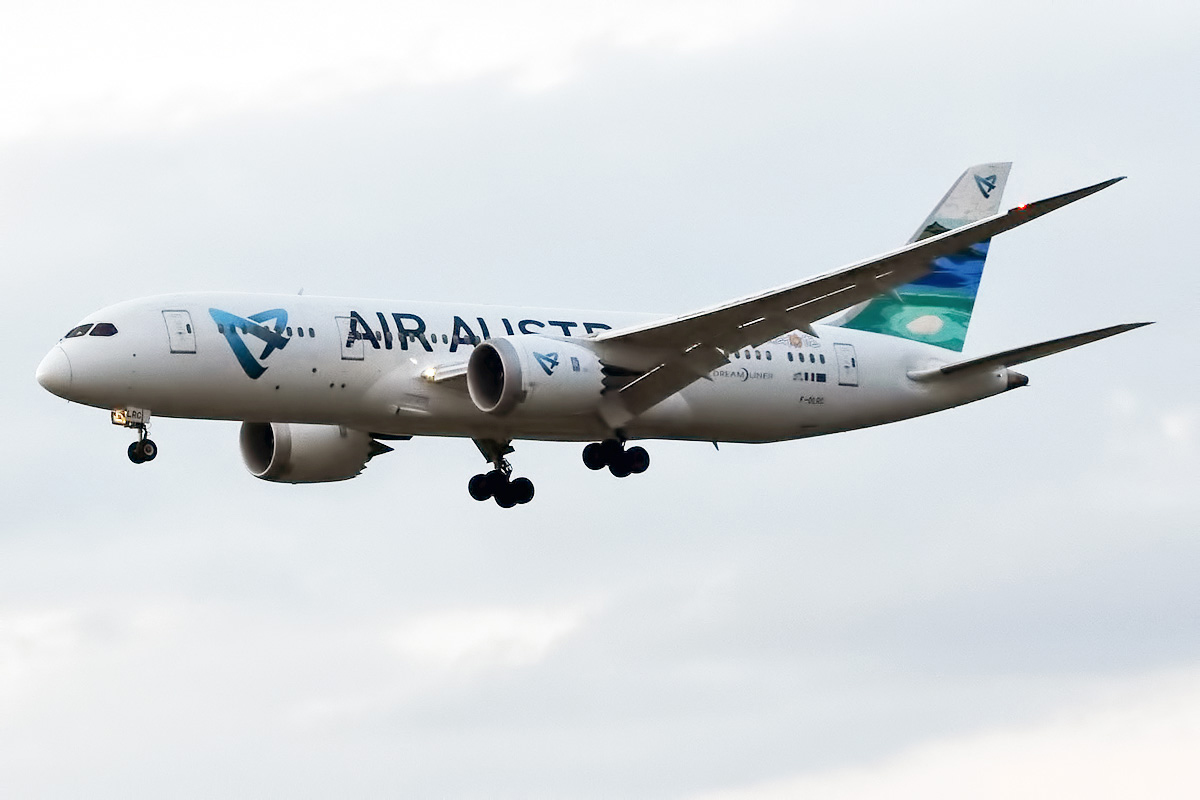
Boeing 787-8 of Air Austral

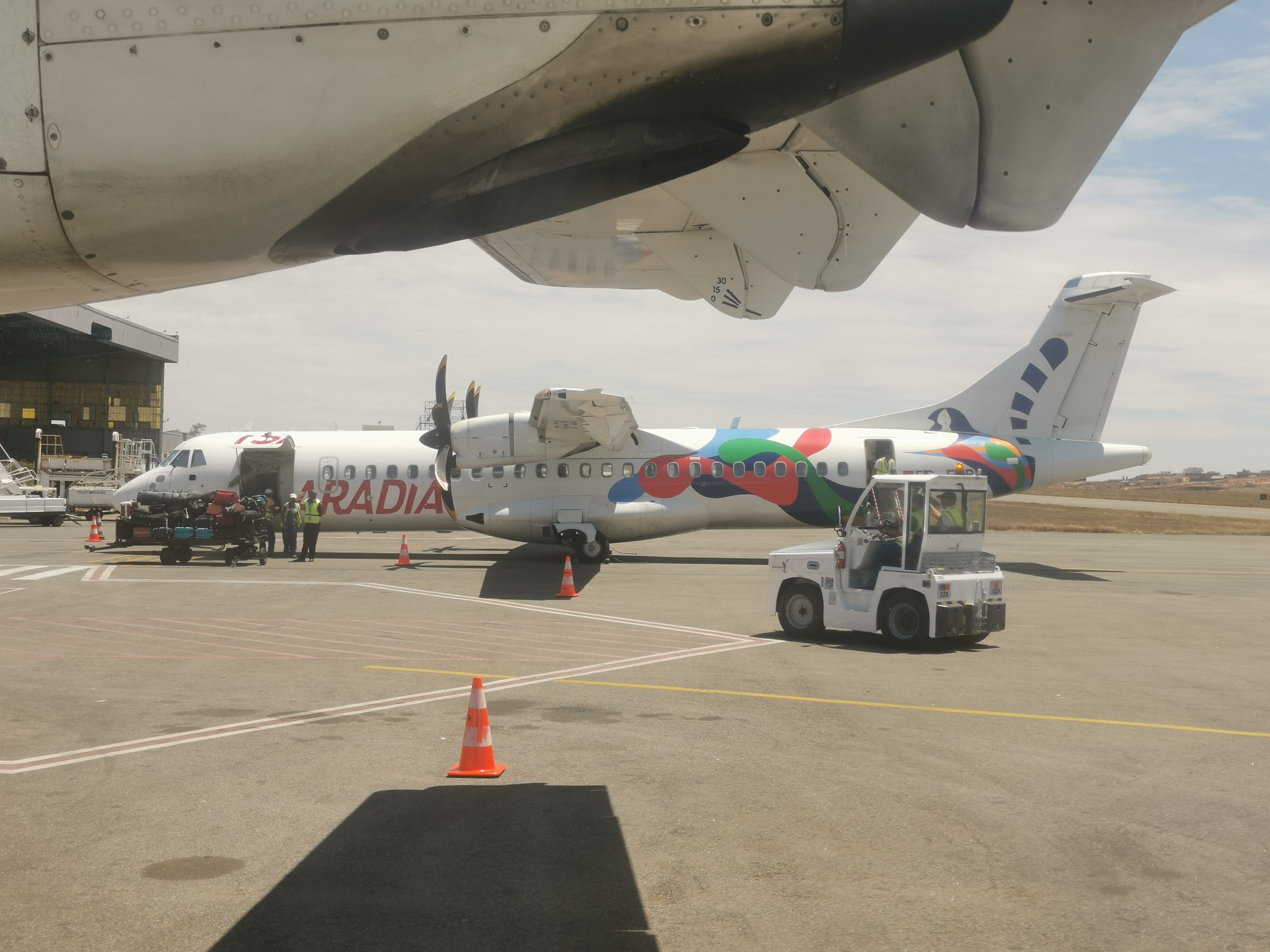
ATR 72-600 of Madagascar Airlines in a former Tsaradia livery

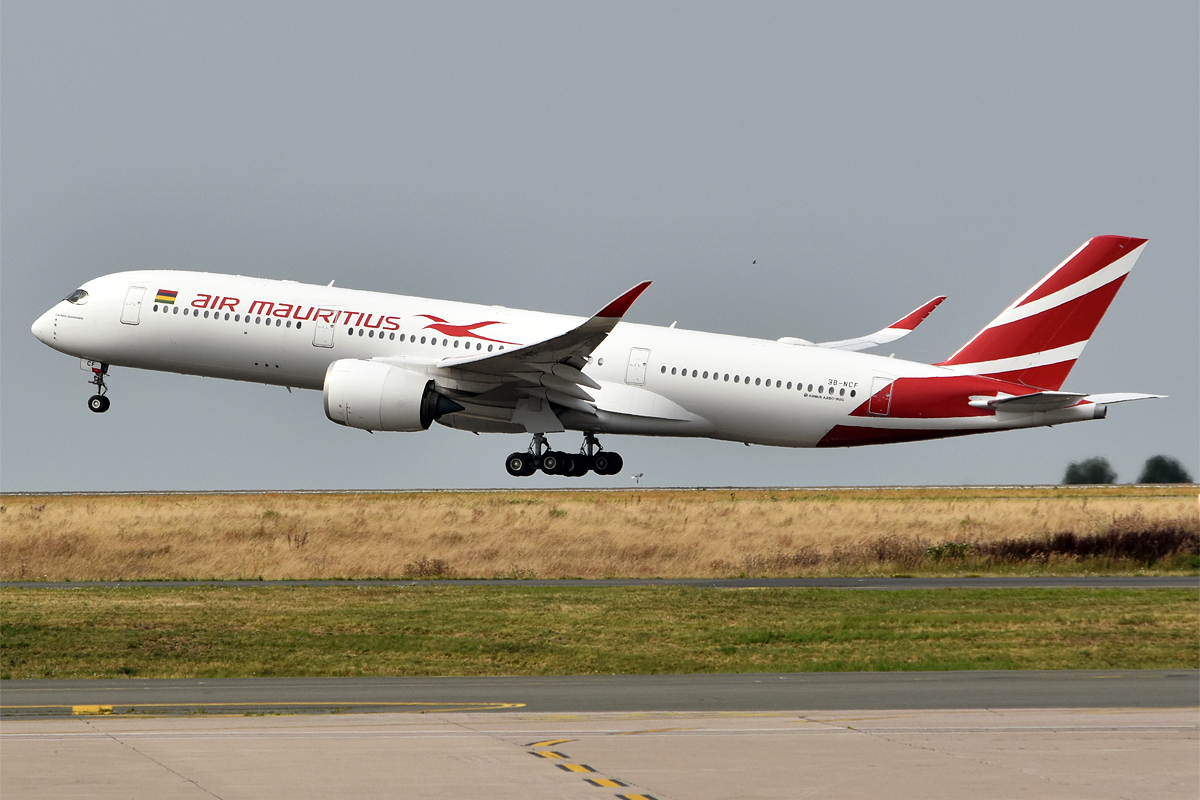
Airbus A350-900 of Air Mauritius

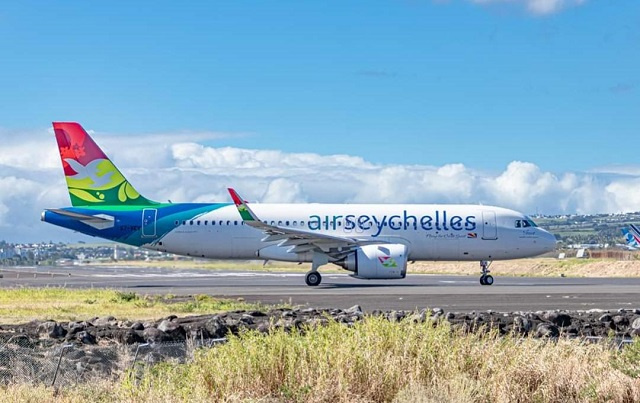
Airbus A320neo of Air Seychelles

Member airline	Joined	Notes
(Réunion) Air Austral	21 September 2015	founder
Madagascar Airlines	21 September 2015	founder
Air Mauritius	21 September 2015	founder
Air Seychelles	21 September 2015	founder

=== Former member airlines ===
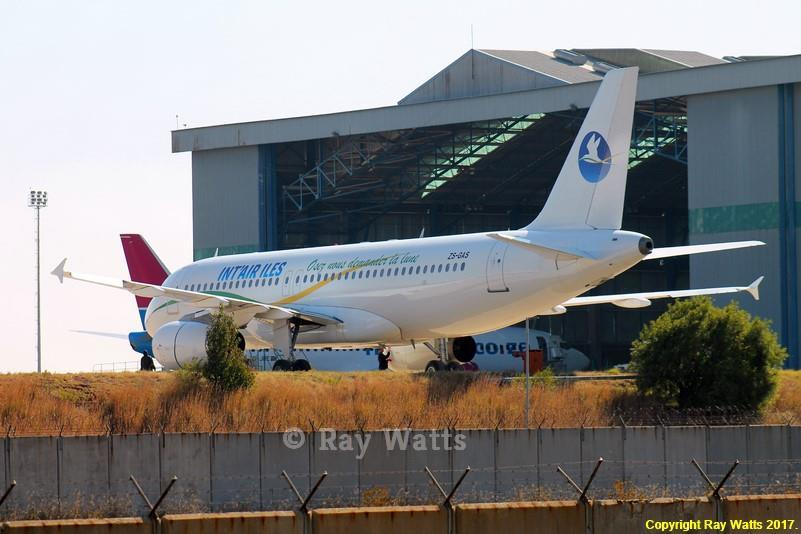
A320-200 of Int'Air Îles

Airline	Joined	Exited	Remarks	Notes
(Comoros) Int'Air Îles	21 September 2015	14 February 2024	Defunct	founder

== See also ==
- Vanilla Islands
- Airline alliance
