= Sir Seewoosagur Ramgoolam International Airport =

International airport serving Port Louis, Mauritius

Sir Seewoosagur Ramgoolam International Airport Laeropor Internasional Sir Seewoosagur Ramgoolam
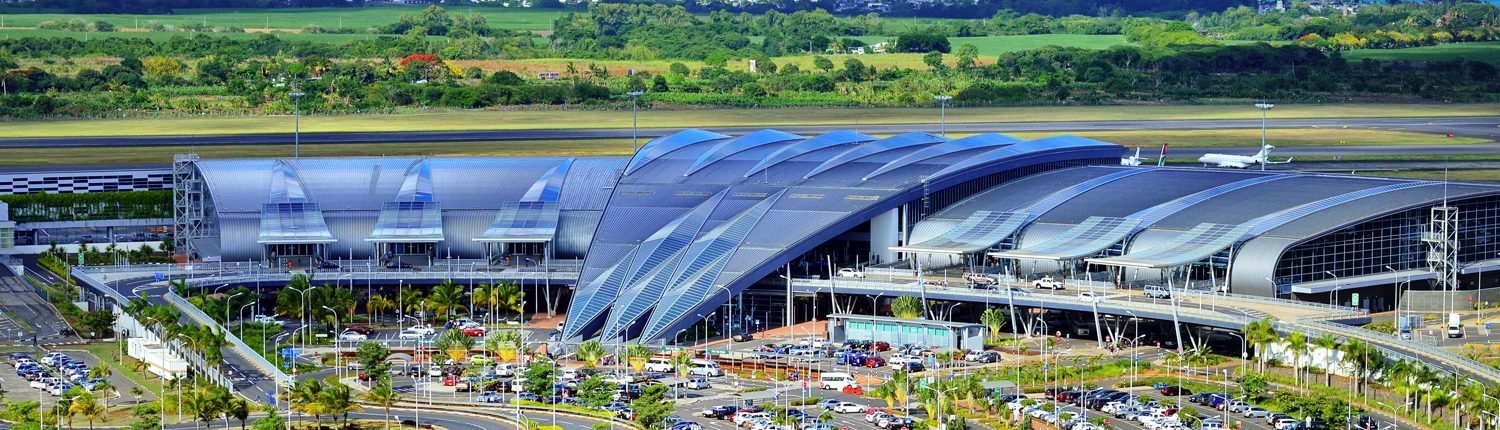
- IATA: MRU; ICAO: FIMP

Summary
- Airport type: Public
- Owner/Operator: Airports of Mauritius Co. Ltd.
- Serves: Mauritius
- Location: Plaine Magnien
- Hub for: Air Mauritius
- Elevation AMSL: 57 m (187 ft)
- Coordinates: 20°25′48.10″S 57°40′58.88″E
- Website: mauritius-airport.atol.aero

Map
- Location in Plaine Magnien, Mauritius MRU/FIMP (Indian Ocean) MRU/FIMP (Africa)

Runways
Direction	Length		Surface
Direction	m	ft	Surface
14/32	3,040	9,974	Asphalt
	2,286	7,500	Asphalt

Statistics (2019)
- Passengers: 3,884,056

Sir Seewoosagur Ramgoolam International Airport (IATA: MRU, ICAO: FIMP) (Mauritian: Laeropor Internasional Sir Seewoosagur Ramgoolam) is the primary international airport serving the island nation of Mauritius. It is located at Plaine Magnien, 48 km (30 mi) southeast of the capital city of Port Louis. The airport was previously known as the Plaisance Airport. It has direct flights to several destinations in Africa, Asia, Australia, and Europe, and is home to the country's national airline, Air Mauritius. Airports of Mauritius Co. Ltd (AML) is the owner and operator of the airport, and the Government of Mauritius is the major shareholder of AML. It is named after Sir Seewoosagur Ramgoolam, the first Prime Minister of Mauritius.

== History ==
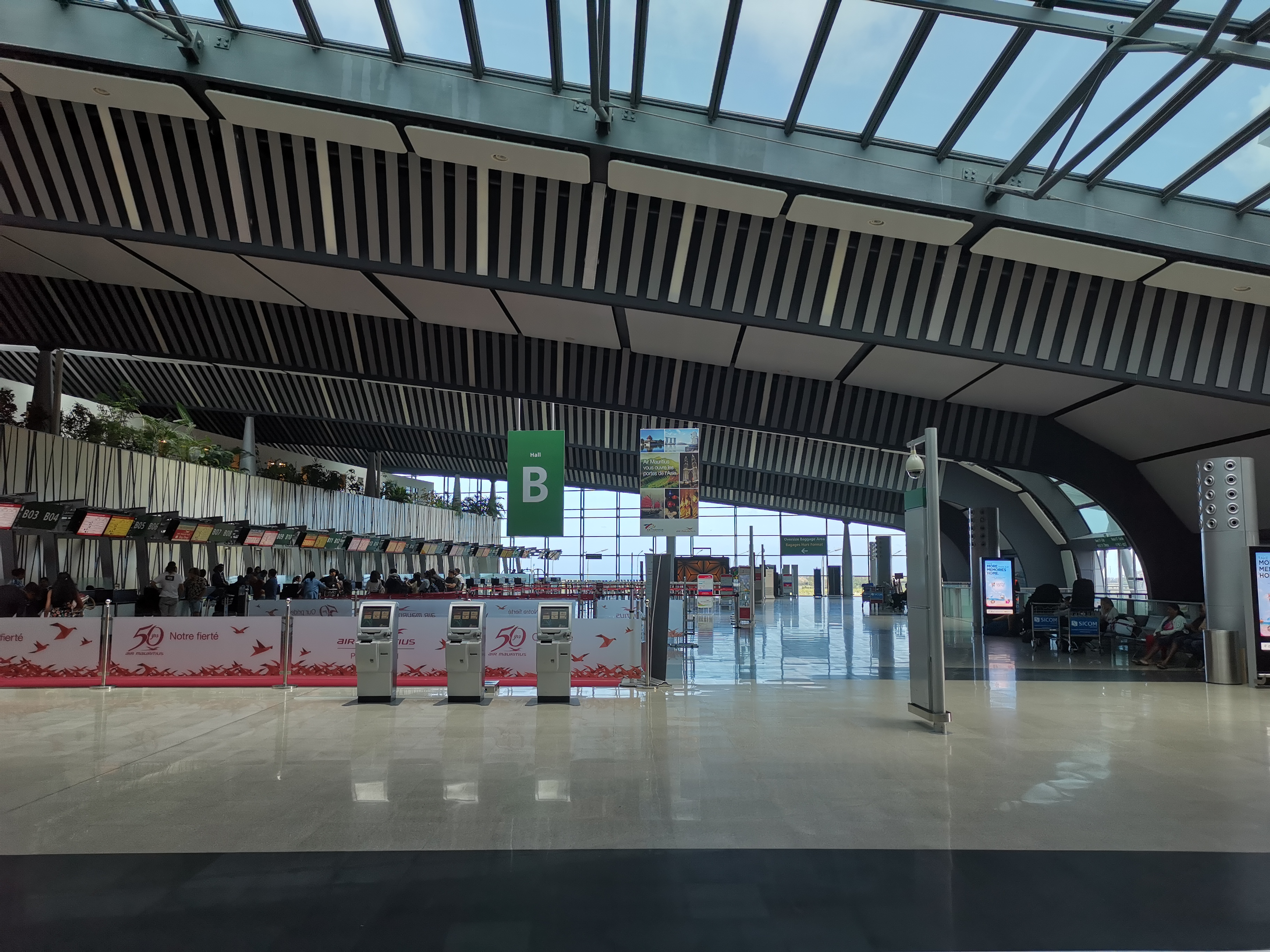
Terminal interior

As a part of the defence of Mauritius, in 1942, when Mauritius was a Crown colony, the government started constructing a Royal Naval Air Station at Plaisance near Mahébourg. This was subsequently handed over to the Royal Air Force at the end of World War II, and civilian operations started shortly afterwards. The operations of the civil airport started just after the Second World War, which gave a boost to the Mauritian economy. In 1960, an electric refitting was completed at Plaisance Airfield, including airfield lighting and telecommunications equipment. A contract was also placed to rebuild the runway.

The first flight to Rodrigues island was made on 10 September 1972, an Air Mauritius flight from Plaisance Airport to the Plaine Corail Airport at Rodrigues using a Twin Otter (3B-NAB). Later, the Twin Otters were replaced by ATR 42-300 and ATR 42-500 twin turboprops.

Later in 1986, infrastructure works were undertaken to accommodate larger aircraft. Thus, a new terminal was built, including airbridges to meet the expected increase in traffic growth, and a car park attached to the new building and customs service for international routes. The new terminal consisted of two floors and could simultaneously accommodate up to four aircraft via airbridges.

== Facilities ==
A new passenger terminal was inaugurated on 30 August 2013 and was fully operational in September 2013. The structure of the New Airport Terminal is designed after the "Traveller's palm", a tropical plant that grows on Mauritius. It is connected to the existing terminal (refurbishment began in 2014) and has a capacity of 4 million passengers. Airport Terminal Operations Ltd (ATOL) is responsible for designing, building, and operating the new terminal building.

The new terminal, which cost US$306 million, aligns with the "Maurice Ile Durable" concept. Environmental and ecological aspects considered include using solar energy collected by photovoltaic cells, recovering rainwater, integrating nature into the heart of the building, and including thermo-insulated facades to reduce heat gain. The terminal covers an area of 57,000 square meters and is equipped with five boarding gates with airbridges, including one compatible with the large Airbus A380.

== Airlines and destinations ==
The following airlines operate regular scheduled and charter flights at Mauritius Airport:

=== Passenger ===
Airlines	Destinations
Aeroflot	Moscow–Sheremetyevo
Air Austral	Saint-Denis de la Réunion; Seasonal: Saint-Pierre de la Réunion
Air France	Paris–Charles de Gaulle
Air India	Mumbai
Air Mauritius	Antananarivo, Cape Town, Chennai, Delhi, Johannesburg–O. R. Tambo, Kuala Lumpur–International, London–Gatwick, Mumbai, Paris–Charles de Gaulle, Perth, Rodrigues, Saint-Denis de la Réunion; Seasonal: Geneva
Air Seychelles	Mahé
Airlink	Cape Town
Austrian Airlines	Vienna
British Airways	London–Gatwick
Bulgaria Air	Seasonal charter: Sofia
Condor	Frankfurt
Corsair International	Lyon, Marseille, Paris–Orly
Discover Airlines	Seasonal: Frankfurt
Edelweiss Air	Zurich
Emirates	Dubai–International
Ethiopian Airlines	Seasonal: Addis Ababa
FlySafair	Johannesburg–O. R. Tambo
Iberojet	Seasonal: Madrid
IndiGo	Bengaluru
ITA Airways	Seasonal: Rome–Fiumicino
Kenya Airways	Nairobi–Jomo Kenyatta
LOT Polish Airlines	Seasonal charter: Warsaw–Chopin
Neos	Seasonal: Milan–Malpensa, Rome–Fiumicino; Seasonal charter: Bratislava, Brno, Ostrava
Saudia	Jeddah; Seasonal charter: Riyadh
South African Airways	Cape Town, Johannesburg—O. R. Tambo
Turkish Airlines	Istanbul
Uzbekistan Airways	Seasonal charter: Tashkent (begins 26 December 2026)
World2Fly	Seasonal: Madrid

== See also ==
- List of airports in Mauritius
- Tourism in Mauritius
- List of the busiest airports in Africa
