= Plaine Corail Airport =

Plaine Corail Airport Aéroport de Plaine Corail
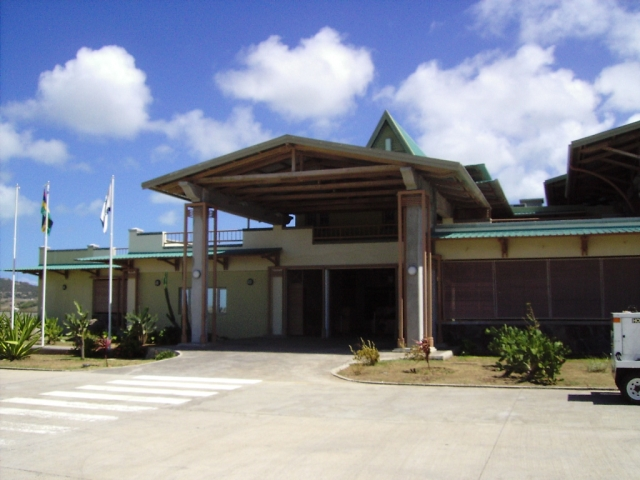
- IATA: RRG; ICAO: FIMR

Summary
- Airport type: Public
- Operator: Airport of Rodrigues Ltd - Licensed Aerodrome Operator
- Serves: Port Mathurin
- Location: Plaine Corail, Rodrigues, Mauritius
- Elevation AMSL: 93 ft (28 m)
- Coordinates: 19°45′27″S 063°21′39″E
- Interactive map of Plaine Corail Airport

Runways
Direction	Length		Surface
Direction	m	ft	Surface
12/30	1,287	4,223	Asphalt
- Source: DAFIF

Plaine Corail Airport (IATA: RRG, ICAO: FIMR) is an airport located near Plaine Corail on Rodrigues, an autonomous outer island of Mauritius.

== History ==
Prior to being renamed in 2017, it was known as Sir Gaëtan Duval Airport, after Gaëtan Duval (1930–1996), a former deputy Mauritian prime minister, who oversaw much of the development of Rodrigues. Airport of Rodrigues Ltd (ARL) was incorporated on 8 February 2000 as a public company.

In 2006, the airport handled 49,500 passengers. It has an asphalt runway which measures 1,287 by 30 metres (4,222 ft × 98 ft). In addition to Air Mauritius service to Mauritius, Air Austral started seasonal service to Reunion's Pierrefonds airport in 2015, later transferring the service to Saint-Denis de la Réunion in 2022.

== Airlines and destinations ==
Airlines	Destinations
Air Austral	Seasonal: Saint-Denis de la Réunion
Air Mauritius	Mauritius

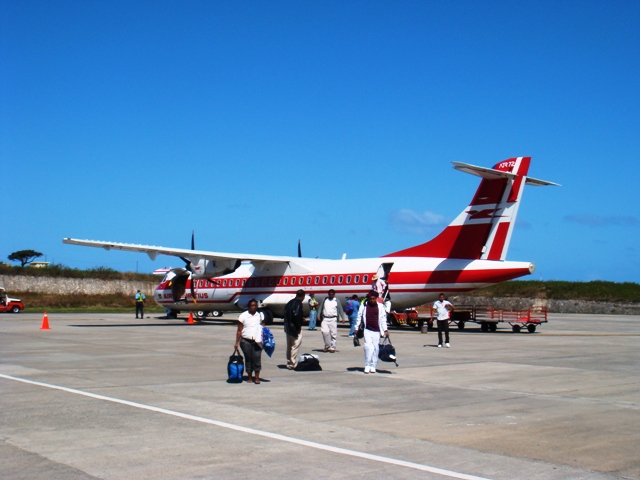
An Air Mauritius ATR 72-500 at Plaine Corail Airport in former livery in 2010.
