= Lists of airlines =

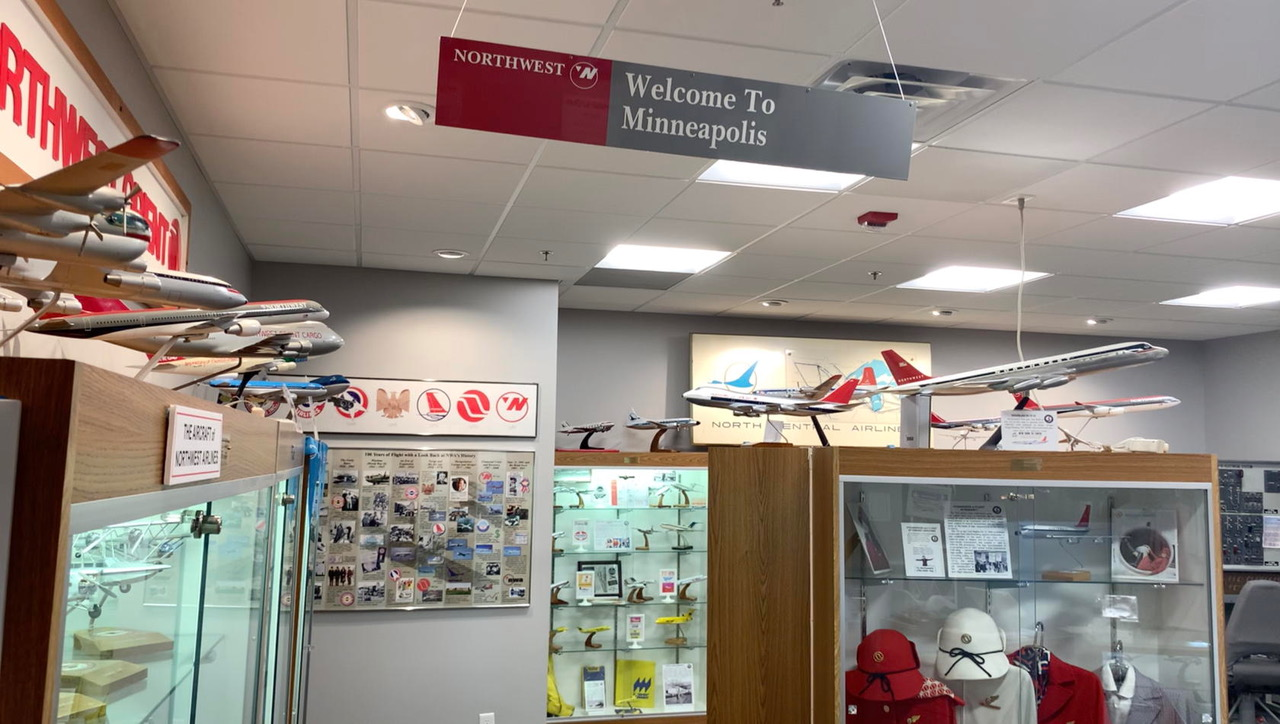
Northwest Airlines History Center in the Minneapolis International Airport

This list covers existing and defunct airlines. Complete lists are given in alphabetical sequence by the name of the continent from which they operate. Lists are also given by size, by business model and by other characteristics. There are over 5,000 airlines with ICAO codes.

== By continent ==
Lists of airlines based on continent:

- List of airlines of Africa
- List of airlines of the Americas
- List of airlines of Asia
- List of airlines of Europe
- List of airlines of Oceania

== By size and continent ==
- List of largest airlines in the world
- List of largest airlines in Africa
- List of largest airlines in Asia
- List of largest airlines in Central America & the Caribbean
- List of largest airlines in Europe
- List of largest airlines in North America
- List of largest airlines in Oceania
- List of largest airlines in South America

== By business model ==
- List of government-owned airlines
- List of passenger airlines
- List of charter airlines
- List of low-cost airlines
- List of regional airlines
- List of cargo airlines

== By other characteristics ==
- Flag carrier
- List of airlines by countries served
- List of airlines by foundation date
- List of airlines with more than 100 destinations
- List of defunct airlines
- List of helicopter airlines
- List of airline codes
