= List of superlatives =

List of items regarded as superlative

The General Sherman Tree, a California giant sequoia, is the largest tree by volume

A list of superlatives is a list consisting of items regarded as superlative. Both items and their qualities can be arrived at objectively and subjectively.

An example of an objective list is Tallest buildings by height. An example of a purely subjective list is any ranking the Greatest of All Time (G.O.A.T.) at anything, from inventors and generals to Presidents and athletes. Similar subjective lists include such topics as "Best and Worst Dressed", "Most Beautiful Women of Hollywood" and "Sexiest Man Alive", named by People magazine annually since 1985.

Such rankings were successfully parodied by Dos Equis beer in a long-running ad campaign featuring actor Jonathan Goldsmith, The Most Interesting Man in the World, which aired from 2006 to 2016.

== Examples on Wikipedia ==
- List of Academy Award records
- List of automotive superlatives - which includes rankings by the smallest, largest, fastest, and best-selling, as well as "firsts" such as the first with a passive restraint, climate control, and in-car entertainment.
- List of bridges by length
- List of busiest airports by passenger traffic
- List of busiest container ports
- List of cities by elevation
- List of cities by GDP
- List of cities by number of billionaires
- List of cities proper by population density
- List of cities with the most skyscrapers
- List of countries and dependencies by area
- List of countries by GDP (nominal)
- List of countries by GDP (PPP)
- List of countries by Human Development Index
- List of countries by income equality
- List of countries by land area
- List of countries by population
- List of countries by research and development spending
- List of countries by smartphone penetration
- List of countries by suicide rate
- List of countries by system of government
- List of deserts by area
- List of earthquakes by death toll
- List of fastest animals
- List of fastest cars by acceleration
- List of films considered the best
- List of films with a 0% rating on Rotten Tomatoes
- List of highest cities
- List of highest mountain peaks of Africa
- List of highest mountains on Earth
- List of highest-grossing animated films
- List of highest-grossing films
- List of highest-grossing non-English films
- List of highest-grossing openings for films
- List of islands by area
- List of islands by population
- List of largest airlines in Africa
- List of largest airlines in Asia
- List of largest airlines in Europe
- List of largest airlines in North America
- List of largest airlines in South America
- List of largest buildings in the world
- List of largest cities
- List of largest companies by revenue
- List of largest container ships
- List of largest dams
- List of largest empires
- List of largest islands
- List of largest libraries in the United States
- List of largest mammals
- List of largest metropolitan areas
- List of largest oil and gas companies by revenue
- List of largest power stations
- List of largest ships by gross tonnage
- List of largest shopping malls
- List of largest stadiums
- List of largest stars
- List of largest universities by enrollment
- List of largest volcanic eruptions
- List of longest bridges
- List of longest caves
- List of longest-running Broadway shows
- List of longest-running TV shows
- List of major stock exchanges
- List of national capitals by population
- List of oldest companies
- List of oldest universities in continuous operation
- List of richest Americans in history
- List of richest people in the world
- List of river systems by length
- List of smallest mammals
- List of stadiums by capacity
- List of superlative Academy Award winners and nominees - which includes multiple winners and nominees for awards such as Best Picture, Best Director, Best Actor, etc., ranked within each category by the most of each.
- List of superlative trees - which ranks trees by such objective qualities as tallest, oldest, and largest leaves, and such subjective ones as "stoutest" and broadest.
- List of tallest buildings and structures
- List of tallest buildings
- List of tallest dams
- List of tallest mountains
- List of tallest people
- List of tallest statues
- List of tallest structures in the world
- List of waterfalls by height
- List of world's largest economies
- List of world's most expensive paintings
- Production car speed record
- Urbanization by sovereign state
