= List of airlines of Norway =

This is a list of airlines currently operating in Norway.

== Scheduled airlines ==
Airline	Image	IATA	ICAO	Callsign	Hub airport(s)	Commenced operations	Notes
Norse Atlantic Airways		N0	NBT	LONGSHIP	Miami, New York–JFK, Oslo, Paris–Charles de Gaulle,	2022	
Norwegian Air Shuttle		DY	NOZ	NORDIC	Alicante, Barcelona (Seasonal), Bergen, Copenhagen, Helsinki, Málaga, Oslo, Riga, Stavanger-Sola, Stockholm–Arlanda, Trondheim	1993	
Scandinavian Airlines		SK	SAS	SCANDINAVIAN	Bergen, Copenhagen, Gothenburg-Landvetter, Oslo, Stavanger, Stockholm-Arlanda, Trondheim	1946	Headquartered and registered in Sweden as SAS AB. Joint flag carrier between Denmark, Norway, and Sweden.
Widerøe		WF	WIF	WIDEROE	Bergen, Bodø, Oslo, Sandefjord, Tromsø	1934	

== Charter airlines ==
Airline	Image	IATA	ICAO	Callsign	Hub airport(s)	Commenced operations	Notes
Bristow Norway			BHL	BRISTOW	Bergen-Flesland, Brønnøysund-Brønnøy, Hammerfest, Stavanger-Sola	1993	
CHC Helikopter Service			HKS	HELIBUS	Bergen-Flesland, Brønnøysund-Brønnøy, Florø, Kristiansund-Kvernberget, Stavanger-Sola	1956	
Fonnafly			NOF	FONNA	Bergen-Flesland	1970	
Helitrans		9I	HTA	SCANBIRD	Mo i Rana, Oslo-Torp, Trondheim-Værnes	1990	
Lufttransport			LTR	LUFT TRANSPORT	Tromsø	1971	
Norsk Luftambulanse						1977	
Sundt Air			MDT	MIDNIGHT	Oslo-Gardermoen	1997	

== See also ==
- List of airlines of Svalbard
- List of defunct airlines of Norway
- List of defunct airlines of Europe
