= List of airlines of Réunion =

This is a list of airlines currently operating in Réunion.

Airline	IATA	ICAO	Callsign	Image	Commenced operations	Notes	
Air Austral	UU	REU	REUNION		1975		
Air Bourbon		ZB	BUB	BOURBON	2003	2004	Founded by Bertrand Rivet, Éric Lazarus, Philippe de Bournonville. Operated Airbus A340-200

== See also ==
- List of airlines
- List of defunct airlines of Africa
