= List of airlines of Asia =

This is a list of lists of airlines of Asia's countries and regions.

== Asia ==
=== Afghanistan ===
- Ariana Afghan Airlines
- Kam Air

=== Bhutan ===
- Bhutan Airlines
- Drukair

=== Kuwait ===
- Jazeera Airways
- Kuwait Airways

=== Lebanon ===
- Middle East Airlines

=== North Korea ===
- Air Koryo

=== Syria ===
- Syrian Air
- Fly Cham

=== Turkmenistan ===
- Turkmenistan Airlines

=== Yemen ===
- Felix Airways
- Queen Bilqis Airways
- Yemenia

== See also ==
- List of airlines
  - List of airlines of the United Kingdom (for those that may serve British Indian Ocean Territory)
- List of defunct airlines of Asia
- List of largest airlines in Asia
