= List of airlines of Europe =

This is a list of airlines of Europe.

== European Union ==
=== Belgium ===
- Brussels Airlines
- TUI fly Belgium

=== Cyprus ===
- Cyprus Airways
- Euroavia Airlines
- TUS Airways

== Albania ==
- Air Kosova

== Bosnia and Herzegovina ==
- Icar Air

== Montenegro ==
- Air Montenegro

== North Macedonia ==
North Macedonia has no active airlines

== Notes ==
Microstates

- Andorra has no airports, but has 1 airline, Andorra Airlines
- Liechtenstein has no airports
- Monaco - List of airlines of Monaco
- San Marino has no airports
- Vatican has no airports

Dependencies and other territories

- Akrotiri and Dhekelia has no active airlines
- Azores - List of airlines of Portugal
- Åland Islands has no active airlines
- Faroe Islands has 1 airline, Atlantic Airways
- Gibraltar has no active airlines
- Guernsey has 1 airline, Aurigny
- Greenland - List of airlines of Greenland
- Isle of Man has no active airlines
- Jersey has no active airlines
- Svalbard - List of airlines of Svalbard

States with limited recognition

- Abkhazia has no active airlines
- Kosovo - List of airlines of Kosovo
- Northern Cyprus has 1 airline, Fly Kıbrıs Airlines
- South Ossetia has no active airlines
- Transnistria has no active airlines

== See also ==
- List of airlines
- List of defunct airlines of Europe
- List of largest airlines in Europe
Due to the size of the list it has been broken down into:
