= List of airlines of Monaco =

This is a list of airlines currently operating in Monaco.

Airline	Image	IATA	ICAO	Callsign	Commenced operations	Notes
Heli Air Monaco		YO	MCM	HELI AIR	1976	
Monacair		QM	MC.003	MONACAIR	1988	

== See also ==
- List of airlines
- List of defunct airlines of Europe
