= Apple Music 100 Best Albums =

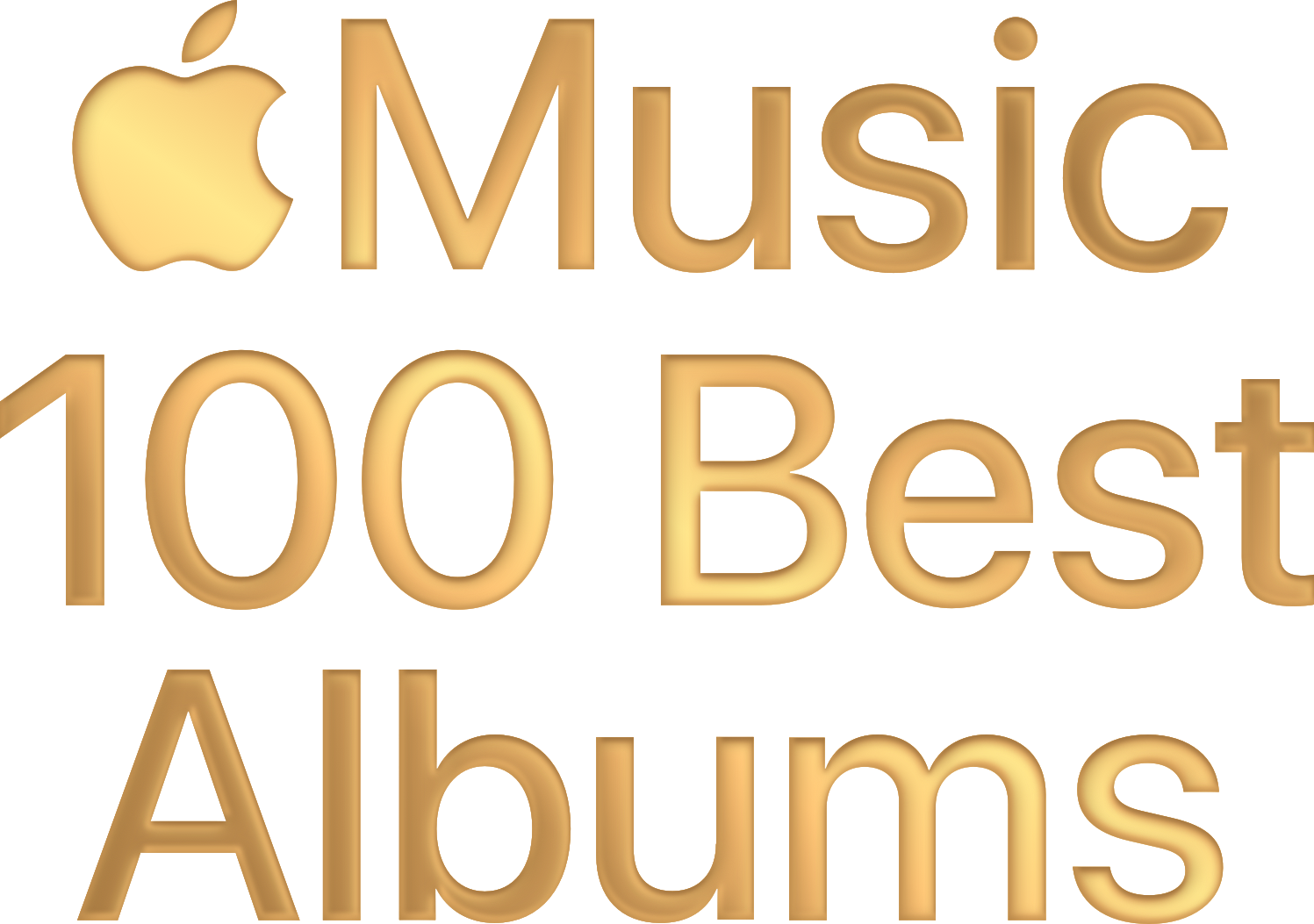
Logo used for the Apple Music 100 Best Albums list

The Apple Music 100 Best Albums is a list of the best albums in history created by the streaming service Apple Music based upon an opinion survey and curated music ranking. Its team crafted the list alongside a group of artists that included Pharrell Williams, J Balvin, Maren Morris, and Charli XCX. The list is an editorial statement rather than being data-based, and does not take into account any streaming figures on Apple Music or any other streaming service.

The list named Lauryn Hill's The Miseducation of Lauryn Hill as the best album, followed by Michael Jackson's Thriller and then the Beatles' Abbey Road. The list received mostly negative reviews from fans and critics.

== Background ==
The lowest 10 placements (#91–100) of the list were announced on May 13, 2024, via a press release by Apple. It was also revealed that the whole list would be released as a countdown revealing 10 albums each day for the next 9 days. To accompany the list, Apple Music unveiled a dedicated microsite to analyze and discuss the albums.

== Reception ==
The list received mostly negative reviews from fans and critics. Aidin Vaziri of the San Francisco Chronicle wrote that "the selection sharply contrasts with the traditional rankings by legacy music publications, such as Rolling Stone." Ben Cohen of The Wall Street Journal wrote that the list "was clearly a stunt to get attention and sell subscriptions to Apple Music", with its ultimate goal being to "get people to actually engage with these albums", while Chris Willman of Variety wrote that the list "exists almost expressly to make you mad". Multiple critics cited recency bias, with the list overrepresenting newly released albums.

Gwilym Mumford of The Guardian called the list "certainly baffling in places", noting the absence of artists such as Johnny Cash, Diana Ross, the Supremes, and the Who, as well as the list's underrepresentation of country music. Ryan Teague Beckwith of MSNBC commented that the list generously represents rock and hip-hop, while only including "token nods" to jazz, folk, reggae, and punk, and neglecting to include blues, gospel, or world music albums. Many fans criticized the list's placement of 1989 (Taylor's Version) by Taylor Swift at number 18, topping highly-regarded pop albums such as Pet Sounds by the Beach Boys and Hounds of Love by Kate Bush, with Cohen calling the placement "absurd".

Several critics commended Apple Music's unorthodox placement of The Miseducation of Lauryn Hill as the greatest album of all time. In response to the placement, Lauryn Hill said, "I appreciate the acknowledgement, I really do, but I'd be remiss not to also acknowledge all of the music and artists who informed and inspired me ... The leaders of community and movements that sparked me, the social dynamics and music scenes, both older and current at the time, that intrigued and inspired me to contribute."

== Complete list ==
Apple Music 100 Best Albums
Number	Album	Artist	Release year
1	The Miseducation of Lauryn Hill	Lauryn Hill	1998
2	Thriller	Michael Jackson	1982
3	Abbey Road	The Beatles	1969
4	Purple Rain	Prince and the Revolution	1984
5	Blonde	Frank Ocean	2016
6	Songs in the Key of Life	Stevie Wonder	1976
7	Good Kid, M.A.A.D City	Kendrick Lamar	2012
8	Back to Black	Amy Winehouse	2006
9	Nevermind	Nirvana	1991
10	Lemonade	Beyoncé	2016
11	Rumours	Fleetwood Mac	1977
12	OK Computer	Radiohead	1997
13	The Blueprint	Jay-Z	2001
14	Highway 61 Revisited	Bob Dylan	1965
15	21	Adele	2011
16	Blue	Joni Mitchell	1971
17	What's Going On	Marvin Gaye	1971
18	1989 (Taylor's Version)	Taylor Swift	2023 (Note: This album is a re-recording of Taylor Swift's 2014 album 1989, including five previously unreleased "From the Vault" tracks.)
19	The Chronic	Dr. Dre	1992
20	Pet Sounds	The Beach Boys	1966
21	Revolver	The Beatles	1966
22	Born to Run	Bruce Springsteen	1975
23	Discovery	Daft Punk	2001
24	The Rise and Fall of Ziggy Stardust and the Spiders from Mars	David Bowie	1972
25	Kind of Blue	Miles Davis	1959
26	My Beautiful Dark Twisted Fantasy	Kanye West	2010
27	Led Zeppelin II	Led Zeppelin	1969
28	The Dark Side of the Moon	Pink Floyd	1973
29	The Low End Theory	A Tribe Called Quest	1991
30	When We All Fall Asleep, Where Do We Go?	Billie Eilish	2019
31	Jagged Little Pill	Alanis Morissette	1995
32	Ready to Die	The Notorious B.I.G.	1994
33	Kid A	Radiohead	2000
34	It Takes a Nation of Millions to Hold Us Back	Public Enemy	1989
35	London Calling	The Clash	1979
36	Beyoncé	Beyoncé	2013
37	Enter the Wu-Tang (36 Chambers)	Wu-Tang Clan	1993
38	Tapestry	Carole King	1971
39	Illmatic	Nas	1994
40	I Never Loved a Man the Way I Love You	Aretha Franklin	1967
41	Aquemini	Outkast	1998
42	Control	Janet Jackson	1986
43	Remain in Light	Talking Heads	1980
44	Innervisions	Stevie Wonder	1973
45	Homogenic	Björk	1997
46	Exodus	Bob Marley and the Wailers	1977
47	Take Care	Drake	2011
48	Paul's Boutique	Beastie Boys	1989
49	The Joshua Tree	U2	1987
50	Hounds of Love	Kate Bush	1985
51	Sign o' the Times	Prince	1987
52	Appetite for Destruction	Guns N' Roses	1987
53	Exile on Main Street	The Rolling Stones	1972
54	A Love Supreme	John Coltrane	1965
55	Anti	Rihanna	2016
56	Disintegration	The Cure	1989
57	Voodoo	D'Angelo	2000
58	(What's the Story) Morning Glory?	Oasis	1995
59	AM	Arctic Monkeys	2013
60	The Velvet Underground & Nico	The Velvet Underground and Nico	1967
61	Love Deluxe	Sade	1992
62	All Eyez on Me	2Pac	1996
63	Are You Experienced	The Jimi Hendrix Experience	1967
64	Baduizm	Erykah Badu	1997
65	3 Feet High and Rising	De La Soul	1989
66	The Queen Is Dead	The Smiths	1986
67	Dummy	Portishead	1994
68	Is This It	The Strokes	2001
69	Master of Puppets	Metallica	1986
70	Straight Outta Compton	N.W.A	1988
71	Trans-Europe Express	Kraftwerk	1977
72	SOS	SZA	2022
73	Aja	Steely Dan	1977
74	The Downward Spiral	Nine Inch Nails	1994
75	Supa Dupa Fly	Missy Elliott	1997
76	Un Verano Sin Ti	Bad Bunny	2022
77	Like a Prayer	Madonna	1989
78	Goodbye Yellow Brick Road	Elton John	1973
79	Norman Fucking Rockwell!	Lana Del Rey	2019
80	The Marshall Mathers LP	Eminem	2000
81	After the Gold Rush	Neil Young	1970
82	Get Rich or Die Tryin'	50 Cent	2003
83	Horses	Patti Smith	1975
84	Doggystyle	Snoop Dogg	1993
85	Golden Hour	Kacey Musgraves	2018
86	My Life	Mary J. Blige	1994
87	Blue Lines	Massive Attack	1991
88	I Put a Spell on You	Nina Simone	1965
89	The Fame Monster	Lady Gaga	2009
90	Back in Black	AC/DC	1980
91	Listen Without Prejudice Vol. 1	George Michael	1990
92	Flower Boy	Tyler, the Creator	2017
93	A Seat at the Table	Solange	2016
94	Untrue	Burial	2007
95	Confessions	Usher	2004
96	Pure Heroine	Lorde	2013
97	Rage Against the Machine	Rage Against the Machine	1992
98	Astroworld	Travis Scott	2018
99	Hotel California	Eagles	1976
100	Body Talk	Robyn	2010

== Statistics ==
=== Genres ===
The following table lists the genres of the albums included on the list, which are based on Apple Music's assigned genre.

Number of albums from each genre
1. Hip-Hop/Rap (21.0%)
2. Rock (18.0%)
3. Pop (16.0%)
4. Alternative (14.0%)
5. R&B/Soul (11.0%)
6. Electronic (4.00%)
7. Hard rock (3.00%)
8. Jazz (3.00%)
9. Motown (2.00%)
10. Punk (2.00%)
11. Singer-Songwriter (2.00%)
12. Country (1.00%)
13. Latin (1.00%)
14. Metal (1.00%)
15. Roots Reggae (1.00%)

Genre	Number of albums	Percentage
Hip-Hop/Rap	21	21%
Rock	18	18%
Pop	16	16%
Alternative	14	14%
R&B/Soul	11	11%
Electronic	4	4%
Hard rock	3	3%
Jazz	3	3%
Motown	2	2%
Punk	2	2%
Singer-songwriter	2	2%
Country	1	1%
Latin	1	1%
Metal	1	1%
Roots Reggae	1	1%

=== Number of albums from each decade ===
Number of albums from each decade
1. 1950s (1.00%)
2. 1960s (10.0%)
3. 1970s (18.0%)
4. 1980s (17.0%)
5. 1990s (23.0%)
6. 2000s (11.0%)
7. 2010s (17.0%)
8. 2020s (3.00%)

Decade	Number of albums	Percentage
1950s	1	1%
1960s	10	10%
1970s	18	18%
1980s	17	17%
1990s	23	23%
2000s	11	11%
2010s	17	17%
2020s	3	3%

=== Artists with multiple albums ===
The following table lists the artists who have two albums included on the list.

Artist	Top	Low	Notes
The Beatles	3	21	One album in the top 10
Prince	4	51	One album in the top 10; includes one album credited to Prince and the Revolution
Stevie Wonder	6	44	One album in the top 10
Beyoncé	10	36	One album in the top 10; only woman with 2 albums on the list
Radiohead	12	33	One album in the top 20
Dr. Dre	19	70	One album in the top 20; count includes one album credited to N.W.A

=== Record labels with multiple albums ===
The following table lists the record labels who have multiple albums included on the list. This is based on the labels under which each album was released originally, not the current copyright holders.

Label	Parent	Number of albums	Notes
Interscope Records	Universal Music Group	10	
Capitol Records	Universal Music Group	6	
Polydor Records	Universal Music Group	4	
Aftermath Entertainment	Universal Music Group	3	Founded by hip hop producer and rapper Dr. Dre in 1996
Def Jam Recordings	Universal Music Group	3	
Island Records	Universal Music Group	3	
Motown	Universal Music Group	3	
Republic Records	Universal Music Group	3	
Virgin Records	Universal Music Group	3	
A&M Records	Universal Music Group	2	Founded as an independent company by Herb Alpert and Jerry Moss in 1962.
Priority Records	Universal Music Group	2	
Roc-A-Fella Records	Universal Music Group	2	Defunct American hip hop label founded by record executives and entrepreneurs Shawn "Jay-Z" Carter, Damon Dash, and Kareem "Biggs" Burke in 1994.
Columbia Records	Sony Music Entertainment	13	
Epic Records	Sony Music Entertainment	6	
Arista Records	Sony Music Entertainment	4	
RCA Records	Sony Music Entertainment	4	
Reprise Records	Warner Music Group	4	Founded in 1960 by Frank Sinatra.
Warner Records	Warner Music Group	4	Also known as Warner Bros. Records.
Atlantic Records	Warner Music Group	3	
Elektra Records	Warner Music Group	3	
Parlophone	Warner Music Group	2	Label founded in Germany in 1896 by the Carl Lindström Company as Parlophon.
Sire Records	Warner Music Group	2	
Death Row Records	Independent Labels	3	Founded in 1991 by The D.O.C., Dr. Dre, Suge Knight, and Dick Griffey.
Rough Trade Records	Independent Labels	2	Independent label based in London, England. Formed in 1976 by Geoff Travis.
Top Dawg Entertainment	Independent Labels	2	Founded in 2004 by record producer Anthony "Top Dawg" Tiffith.
Parkwood Entertainment Records	Parkwood Entertainment	2	American label founded by American singer-songwriter Beyoncé in 2010.

=== Albums by artist's country of origin ===
Number of albums from each country
1. USA (63.0%)
2. UK (22.0%)
3. Canada (4.00%)
4. Australia (1.00%)
5. Barbados (1.00%)
6. France (1.00%)
7. Germany (1.00%)
8. Iceland (1.00%)
9. Ireland (1.00%)
10. Jamaica (1.00%)
11. New Zealand (1.00%)
12. Puerto Rico (1.00%)
13. Sweden (1.00%)

Country	Number of albums
United States	63
United Kingdom	22
Canada	4
Australia	1
Barbados	1
France	1
Germany	1
Iceland	1
Ireland	1
Jamaica	1
New Zealand	1
Puerto Rico	1
Sweden	1

== See also ==
- Album era
- All Time Top 1000 Albums
- Critic's Choice: Top 200 Albums
- NME's The 500 Greatest Albums of All Time
- 1001 Albums You Must Hear Before You Die
- Rolling Stone's 500 Greatest Albums of All Time
- Rolling Stone's 500 Greatest Songs of All Time
- Rolling Stone's 100 Greatest Songwriters of All Time
- Rolling Stone's 100 Greatest Artists of All Time
