= List of airlines of Mayotte =

This is a list of airlines currently operating in Mayotte.

| AIRLINE | IATA | ICAO | Call sign | COMMENCED OPERATIONS |
|---|---|---|---|---|
| Ewa Air | ZD | EWR | MAYOTTE AIR | 2013 |

== See also ==
- List of airlines
- List of defunct airlines of Africa
