= List of airlines of Africa =

This list of airlines of Africa covers airlines of Africa that are currently in operation. It is divided into sub-lists by country.

== Airlines by country ==
=== Burundi ===
- Burundi Airlines

=== Comoros ===
Comoros has one airline, R-Komor

=== Congo, Republic of ===
- Canadian Airways Congo
- Equaflight
- Equatorial Congo Airlines
- Trans Air Congo

=== Djibouti ===
- Air Djibouti
- Daallo Airlines

=== Eritrea ===
- Eritrean Airlines

=== Guinea ===
- Eagle Air
- Elysian Airlines

=== Guinea-Bissau ===
Guinea-Bissau has no active airlines.

=== Lesotho ===
Lesotho has no active airlines.

=== Liberia ===
Liberia has no active airlines.

=== Mauritania ===
- Mauritania Airlines

=== Mauritius ===
- Air Mauritius

=== Mozambique ===
- LAM Mozambique Airlines
- Moçambique Expresso

=== Rwanda ===
- RwandAir

=== São Tomé and Príncipe ===
- STP Airways

=== Senegal ===
- Air Senegal
- Arc en Ciel Airlines
- Transair

=== Sierra Leone ===
- Air Sierra Leone

=== Togo ===
- Asky Airlines

=== Tunisia ===
- Express Air Cargo
- Nouvelair
- Tunisair Express
- Tunisair
- Tunisavia

== Notes ==
Dependencies and other territories'

- Ascension Island, see RAF Ascension Island
- Canary Islands - List of airlines of Spain
- Ceuta has no airlines operating from within the territory
- Madeira - List of airlines of Portugal
- Mayotte - List of airlines of Mayotte
- Melilla - List of airlines of Spain
- Réunion - List of airlines of Réunion
- Saint Helena - served by Airlink, see Saint Helena Airport
- Tristan da Cunha has no airlines operating from within the territory

States with limited recognition

- Sahrawi Arab Democratic Republic has no active airlines
- Somaliland has no active airlines

== See also ==
- List of largest airlines in Africa
- List of defunct airlines of Africa
