= Queen Bilqis Airways =

Yemeni airline

IATA	ICAO	Call sign
QA	QBA	BILQIS
- Founded: 2013
- Hubs: Aden International Airport
- Fleet size: 2
- Destinations: 4
- Headquarters: Aden, Yemen
- Website: qbilqis.com

Queen Bilqis Airways is a privately held regional airline based in Aden, Yemen.

== History ==
It was founded in 2013 and secured state approval in December 2016 and was set to start operations in summer 2017 but ended up commencing operations on 24 November 2018. Queen Bilqis Airways launched flights to Queen Alia International Airport in December 2018 and expanded coverage to Seiyun in the same month.

== Destinations ==
As of 2018, Queen Bilqis Airways served the following destinations, while as of 2021, there are no scheduled routes operated.

City	Country	Airport	Notes	Refs
Aden	Yemen	Aden International Airport	Base	
Amman	Jordan	Queen Alia International Airport		
Seiyun	Yemen	Seiyun Airport		
Khartoum	Sudan	Khartoum		

== See also ==
- List of airlines of Yemen
