= List of largest airlines in Oceania =

This is a list of the largest airlines in Oceania. It is ranked by number of transported passengers.

== By passengers carried (millions) ==
Rank	Airline / holding	'24	'23	'22	'21	'20	'19	'18	'17	'16	'15	'14	'13	'12	'11	'10	'09	'08	'07	Passenger fleet	Current destinations	Sources	Alliance / association
1	(Australia) Qantas Group ^{1}^{2}	55.9	51.8	45.7	21.3	15.9	40.5	55.8	55.3	53.7	52.7	49.2	48.8	48.3	46.7	44.5	41.4	38.4	38.6	131	104		Oneworld
2	Virgin Australia Holdings ^{1}^{3}	20.7	19.2	18.9	9.8	5.5	13.3 (H1)	25.5	24.9	24.2	23.7	22.3	20.0	19.3	19.4	18.6	18.6	18.2	16.7	99	50		n/a
3	Air New Zealand ^{1}^{4}	15.9	16.5	15.8	7.7	8.6			15.56 (Nov)	16.4	15.5	15.0	13.8	13.4	13.1	13.1	12.3	12.4	13.2	116	52		Star Alliance
4	(Australia) Regional Express Holdings ^{1}^{6}			2.7									-	1.1	1.2	1.2	1.2	1.2	-	48	36		n/a
5	Fiji Airways ^{5}		2.2	1.4			1.7						-	-	-	1.1	-	0.7	-	13	23		Oneworld (Connect Partner)
6	(Papua New Guinea) Air Niugini			1.2									-	1.5	-	-	-	1.0	-	31	35		n/a
7	(French Polynesia) Air Tahiti		1.0										-	-	-	-	0.6	0.6	-	12	47		
8	(New Caledonia) Aircalin		0.41										-	-	-	-	0.4	0.4	-	3	11		-
9	(French Polynesia) Air Tahiti Nui	0.45	0.45	0.39	0.19	0.17	0.43	0.47	0.48	0.48	0.47	0.46	0.42	0.42	-	-	0.3	0.4	-	5	5		-

Notes

- ^1 Statistics for a fiscal year ending on 30 June are located in the column labeled with the regular calendar year in which the period began.
- ^2 Includes figures for QantasLink, Jetstar, Jetconnect and Network Aviation.
- ^3 Includes figures for Virgin Australia, Virgin Australia Regional Airlines, Virgin Samoa and Tigerair Australia (2014–2020)
- ^4 Includes figures for Air New Zealand Link (including Air Nelson, Eagle Airways and Mount Cook Airline).
- ^5 Includes figures for Pacific Sun.
- ^6 Includes figures for Rex Airlines, Airlink and Pel-Air.

== See also ==
- List of largest airlines in Europe
- List of largest airlines in Central America and the Caribbean
- List of largest airlines in Africa
- List of largest airlines in Asia
- List of largest airlines in South America
- List of largest airlines in North America
