= List of largest airlines in Europe =

The following is a list of the largest airlines in Europe by total scheduled and chartered passengers, in millions. The list includes companies classified as European by the IATA. The order of the chart and its completion goes only up to the year 2024.

Country	Airline/holding	'25	'24	'23	'22	'21	'20	'19	'18	'17	'16	'15	'14	'13	'12	'11	'10	'09	'08	'07	'06	Fleet	Destinations	Sources	Alliance	Association
Ireland; Malta; Poland; United Kingdom	Ryanair (Note: Includes Lauda Europe, Ryanair UK, Malta Air and Buzz.)	206.6	197.1	181.74	160.4	72.4	52.01	152.4	139.2	128.77	116.8	101.4	86.4	81.40	79.61	76.4	72.7	65.3	57.7	49.0	40.5	430	186			A4E
Germany; Austria; Belgium; Italy; Switzerland	Lufthansa Group (Note: Includes Lufthansa (inc. Lufthansa Regional (inc. Lufthansa CityLine and Air Dolomiti)), Eurowings, Swiss International Air Lines (inc. Edelweiss Air), Austrian Airlines and Brussels Airlines.)	135.04	131.30	122.54	101.78	46.95	36.35	145.20	141.94	130.04	109.67	107.68	105.99	104.59	103.59	100.60	92.69	76.54	70.54	63.10	68.06	728	321		Star Alliance	A4E; IATA
United Kingdom; Ireland; Spain	International Airlines Group (Note: Includes British Airways (inc. BA CityFlyer), Iberia (inc. Air Nostrum and Iberia Express), Vueling Airlines, Level and Aer Lingus (inc. Aer Lingus Regional).)	121.56	122.05	115.56	94.73	38.86	31.3	118.3	112.92	104.83	100.7	94.9	77.3	67.22	54.6	51.7	50.6	53.3	59.8	61.7	63.2	520	248		oneworld	A4E; ERA; IATA
France; Netherlands	Air France-KLM (Note: Includes Air France (inc. Air France Hop and Transavia France) and KLM (inc. KLM cityhopper, and Transavia).)	102.84	97.96	93.57	83.32	44.67	34.1	104.2	101.45	98.72	93.4	89.8	87.4	78.44	77.45	75.8	70.8	71.4	73.8	74.8	73.5	574	231		SkyTeam	A4E; ERA; IATA
United Kingdom; Austria; Switzerland	EasyJet (Note: Includes EasyJet UK, EasyJet Switzerland, and EasyJet Europe.)	94.91	86.51	82.8	69.7	20.4	16.09	103.3	88.5	81.63	74.5	69.9	65.3	61.33	59.21	55.5	49.7	46.1	44.6	38.2	33.7	300	136			A4E
Turkey	Turkish Airlines (Note: Includes AJet.)	92.64	85.17	83.39	71.82	44.8	27.95	74.28	75.16	68.61	62.8	61.2	54.8	48.3	39.0	32.6	29.1	25.1	22.6	19.6	16.9	516	356		Star Alliance	AIRE; IATA
Hungary; United Kingdom; Malta	Wizz Air (Note: Includes Wizz Air UK and Wizz Air Malta.)	68.59	62.69	60.31	45.66	21.71	16.67	39.80	33.81	28.27	22.78	19.2	15.8	13.5	12.0	11.2	9.6	7.8	5.8	4.2	3.0	168	144			
Russia	Aeroflot Group (Note: Includes Rossiya Airlines and Pobeda.)	55.34	55.3	47.3	40.7	45.81	30.16	60.7	55.7	50.13	43.4	39.4	34.7	31.4	27.5	16.4	14.1	11.1	11.6	10.2	8.7	336	189		~~SkyTeam~~	IATA
Turkey	Pegasus Airlines	43.26	37.48	31.93	26.94	20.16	14.71	30.76	29.97	27.82	24.14	22.34	19.74	16.82	13.58	11.3	8.6	5.9	4.4	-	3.1	128	161			IATA
Sweden; Norway; Denmark; Ireland	SAS Group (Note: Includes Scandinavian Airlines, Scandinavian Airlines Ireland and SAS Link.)			21.1	17.87	10.19	8.81	29.8	30.0	28.37	29.4	27.1	27.3	25.56	25.32	24.7	23.1	22.8	27.0	27.2	26.9	151	149		SkyTeam	ERA; IATA
Norway; Sweden	Norwegian Air Shuttle ASA (Note: Includes Widerøe, Norwegian Air Norway and Norwegian Air Sweden.)	27.25	22.63	20.62	17.84	6.19	6.87	36.20	37.34	33.15	29.3	25.8	24.0	20.71	17.69	15.7	13.0	10.8	9.1	6.9	5.1	88	130			A4E
United Kingdom	Jet2.com	20.52	19.50	17.32	15.53	3.17	2.85	14.39	12.17	9.70	6.72	5.85	6.0	5.5	4.78	4.2	3.3	3.1	3.4	3.9	2.7	90	50			A4E
Germany; Belgium; Netherlands; Sweden; United Kingdom	TUI Group (Note: Includes TUI Airways (formerly Thomson Airways), TUI fly Belgium (Jetairfly), TUI fly Germany (TUIfly), TUI fly Netherlands (Arkefly), TUI fly Nordic)	20.2	20.3	19	16.7	2.02	2.02	26.0						33.7	-	-	-	-	-	-	-	133	-			A4E; IATA
Greece	Aegean Airlines (Note: Includes Olympic Air.)	17.3	16.33	15.46	12.5	7.19	5.17	14.99	13.97	13.22	12.46	11.6	10.2	8.8	8.9	9.9	10.1	10.2	11.3	11.1	10.1/	67	153		Star Alliance	A4E; IATA
Portugal	TAP Air Portugal (Note: Includes TAP Express.)	16.7	16.1	15.9	13.76	5.83	4.66	17.05	15.89	14.27	11.72	11.3	11.4	10.7	10.2	9.8	9.1	8.4	8.7	7.9	6.9	110	88		Star Alliance	A4E; ERA; IATA
Italy	ITA Airways	16.65	18.09	15.17	10.33	1.32	—															95	70		Star Alliance	IATA
Turkey	SunExpress	16	15.0	12.6	10.7	6.1	3.7	10.1	9.7	8.8	7.9	8.7	7.3	6.7	6.4	7.2	6.7	5.6	4.22	3.0	2.7	81	92			IATA
Russia	S7 Airlines (Note: Includes Citrus.)	12.8	12.9	15.9	16.03	17.83	12.35	17.9	15.96	14.25	13.15	10.6	10.1	9.3	8.3	5.1	4.8	5.6	5.9	5.7	4.9	100	121		~~oneworld~~	IATA
Spain	Air Europa	12.53	12.21	11.74	10.03	5.04	4.26	13.13	11.84	10.6	10.6	10.2	8.1	9.0	8.1	8.7	8.9	9.0	9.7	9.9	8.1	60	57		SkyTeam	IATA
Finland	Finnair (Note: Includes Norra)	11.88	11.66	10.98	9.10	2.85	3.48	14.65	13.28	11.90	10.87	10.2	9.6	9.27	8.77	8.0	7.1	7.4	8.3	8.7	8.8	73	103		oneworld	A4E; IATA
Poland	LOT Polish Airlines (Note: Includes LOT Charters.)	11.7	10.7	10.03	9.3	4.2	3.59	11.79	10.61	8.5	6.89	5.58	6.1	5.9	6.3	5.8	5.5	5.0	4.0	4.3	3.71	91	120		Star Alliance	AIRE; IATA
Spain	Volotea	11.3	11.4	10.4	9.4	6.0	3.8	7.6	6.57	4.82	4.3	2.5	1.8	1.4		—						23	60			A4E; IATA
Kazakhstan	Air Astana (Note: Includes Air Astana and FlyArystan.)	9.7	9.6	8.1	7.4	6.62	3.70	5.12	4.32	4.19	3.75	3.86	3.77	3.68	3.24	3.06	2.57	2.20	2.30	2.13	1.47	63	132			IATA
Germany	Condor	9.6	8.5	8	7.0			9.4	Part of Thomas Cook Group Airlines																	IATA
Latvia	AirBaltic	8.7	8.3	7.03	3.44	1.6	1.36	5.05	4.14	3.52	2.89	2.6	2.8	2.95	3.08	3.4	3.2	2.8	-	2.0	1.4	50	60			A4E; IATA
Russia	Ural Airlines	8.4	9.52	9.41	8.49	9.20	5.60	9.62	9.0	8.0	6.47	5.4	5.1	4.4	3.5	2.5	1.8	1.5	1.5	1.2	1.0	47	66			IATA
Czech Republic; Hungary; Poland; Slovakia	Czech Airlines (Note: Includes SmartWings, Smartwings Hungary, Smartwings Poland, Smartwings Slovakia.)		8.3		5.2	2.53	1.8	9.6	8.8	8.17	7.3		6.57	-	-	-	-	Part of Icelandair Group		-	-	49	80		SkyTeam	A4E; IATA
Uzbekistan	Uzbekistan Airways (Note: Includes Uzbekistan Airways Express and Silk Avia)	6.61	6.21	5.02	4.23	2.01	0.93	3.80	3.17	2.70	2.47	2.57	2.63	2.68	2.65	2.32	2.16	1.89	2.07	1.99	1.71					IATA
Russia	UTair Aviation	6.2	6.40	6.06	5.54	7.12	4.90	8.09	7.65	7.3	6.65	8.8	11.2	10.4	7.8	5.8	5.2	3.9	3.23	2.93	2.42	66	117			IATA
Spain	Binter Canarias (Note: Includes Canarias Airlines and Naysa Servicios Aéreos)	6.1	5.6	5.00	4.43	3.14	2.27	4.0	3.6	3.4	2.7	2.65	2.6	2.1	2.5	2.6	2.6	2.63	2.9	3.02	3.0					ERA; IATA
United Kingdom	Virgin Atlantic (Note: Includes Virgin Atlantic Airways and Virgin Atlantic International)	5.85	5.58	5.10	4.28	1.08	1.17	5.74	5.40	5.22	5.20	5.77	6.2	5.5	5.4	5.3	5.3	5.7	5.7	5.1	4.6	40	37		SkyTeam	IATA
Greece	Sky Express	5.13	4.69	4.15	3.30	1.72		1.20	1.00	0.50	0.17	0.07	—									29	60			ERA; IATA
Iceland	Icelandair Group (Note: Includes Icelandair and Air Iceland Connect.)	5.06	4.67	4.29	3.66	1.46	0.89	4.41	4.14	4.05	3.67	3.0	2.9	2.6	2.4	1.8	1.7	1.8	1.5	1.6	1.5	47	36			A4E; IATA
Serbia	Air Serbia	4.57	4.44	4.19	2.75	1.59	0.87	2.81	2.48	2.61	2.62	2.55	2.3	1.4	1.3	1.2	1.0	1.0	1.3	1.3	1.2	34	81			ERA; IATA
Russia	Nordwind Airlines	4.5	4.4	4.3		5.93	2.94	5.54	4.92	3.54	1.79	2.67	4.46	3.59	2.19	1.72	1.19	0.56	0.02	—		26	97			IATA
Azerbaijan	Azerbaijan Airlines	4.16	4.04	2.9	2.25	0.87	0.57	2.60	1.89	2.29						1.4	1.0					32	57			IATA
Norway	Widerøe	4.13	3.80	3.43	3.28	2.45	1.77	3.00																		ERA; IATA
Poland; Ireland; Switzerland	Enter Air Group (Note: Includes Enter Air, Fly4 Airlines and Chair Airlines)		3.9	3.1	2.2	1.72	0.65	2.5	1.12	1.17	1.11	1.17	-	-	-	-	-	1.2	—			49	340			
Russia	Smartavia	~3.23	3.54	3.80	3.24	3.62	1.64	2.03	1.19	1.09	0.96	0.73	0.76	0.76	0.81	1.47	1.4	Part of Aeroflot Group				15	67			IATA
Ukraine; Malta; Moldova	SkyUp (Note: Includes SkyUp MT and Sky Up Nistru (formerly Vision Air).)	>3	2.5	1.55	1.08	2.57	1.25	1.71	0.44	—												14	64			IATA
Moldova; Romania; Armenia; Uzbekistan	FLYONE Group (Note: Includes Fly One Moldova, FlyOne Airlines, Fly One Armenia and FlyOne Asia.)	>3	2.4									—														IATA
Italy	AeroItalia	2.92	2.36	1.08	0.07	—																13				ERA; IATA
Russia	Red Wings Airlines	2.7	2.9	2.72	2.21	3.00	1.54	3.07	2.62	1.62	0.92	1.04	0.92	0.35	0.82	0.78	0.88	0.70				18	20			
Portugal	SATA Group (Note: Includes Azores Airlines and SATA Air Açores)	2.67	2.70	2.40	1.92	1.28	0.67	1.71	0.89	0.99	0.86											16				ERA; IATA
Luxembourg	Luxair (Note: Includes Luxair Luxembourg Airlines and LuxairTours.)	2.6	2.6	2.5	2.05	1.08	0.66	2.15	2.13	1.93	1.84	1.81	1.68	1.51	1.37	1.30	1.25	1.2	1.2	1.2		17	94			A4E; ERA; IATA
France; Guadeloupe	Groupe Dubreuil (Note: Includes Air Caraïbes, Air Caraïbes Atlantique and French bee)			2.5																						IATA
Italy	Neos	2.28	2.26	2.20	1.57																					
Russia	Azimuth	2.27	2.47	2.3	1.9	2.09	1.22	1.25	0.67	0.07	—											11	31			
Russia	Azur Air	2.2	2.3	1.9	2.1	3.73	1.93	5.79	4.24	3.75	2.34	2.35	0.21	Part of UTAir								27				
Belarus	Belavia	2.09	1.93		1.6			4.00	3.39	3.0	2.49	2.09	1.97	1.6	1.3	1.0		0.7				29	48			IATA
Croatia	Croatia Airlines	2.04	1.84	1.73	1.45	0.79	0.62	2.18	2.17	2.13	1.94	1.8	1.8	1.8	2.0	1.9	1.6	1.8	1.7	1.5		13	40		Star Alliance	ERA; IATA
Denmark	Sunclass Airlines								Part of Thomas Cook Group Airlines													12	25			A4E; ERA
Norway	Norse Atlantic Airways	1.84	1.47	0.98	0.30		—															12	11			
Moldova; Romania	HiSky	1.8	1.7	1.6	0.7	0.2	—																			
Malta	KM Malta Airlines	1.74	1.40	—																						IATA
Romania	TAROM	1.7	2.02	2.30	1.99	1.5	0.90	3.3	2.80	2.4	2.4	2.4	2.2	2.1	2.2	2.2	2.2	1.7	2.0	1.91	1.45	12	26		SkyTeam	IATA
Russia	Aurora Group (Note: Includes Yakutia Airlines, Khabarovsk Airlines, Kamchatka Air Enterprise, Chukotavia, Polar Airlines, Taiga Airlines/Aviashelf.)	1.7	>1.5	1.35	1.16	1.07	Part of Aeroflot Group								—											
United Kingdom	Loganair	1.33	1.36	1.32	1.29	0.73	0.35	0.95	0.76	0.77	0.75	0.68	-	-	-	-	-	-	-	-	-	34	44			ERA; IATA
Russia	NordStar	1.27	1.26	1.26	1.08	1.16	0.88	1.28	1.42	1.4	1.29	1.13	1.1	1.24	1.16	0.77	0.54	-	—			15	50			IATA
Russia	Yamal Airlines	>1.2				1.26	0.70	1.75	1.97	1.79	1.45	1.43	1.45	1.3	0.91	0.57	0.5					36	38			
Russia	Ikar			1.1		1.72	0.76	2.16	2.02	1.38	0.99	1.08	1.24	0.28	-	-	-	-	-	-	-	10	29			IATA
Tajikistan	Somon Air	1.09	1.01	0.79																—						IATA
Russia	IrAero	>1	1.05	1.14	0.98	0.93	0.95					0.27	0.27													
Russia	I-Fly								1.13	0.75	0.4	0.61	0.97	1.05	0.63	0.41	0.38	-	—			10	30			
Romania	AnimaWings			Part of Aegean Airlines				—														7	30			
Bulgaria	Bulgaria Air		0.76	0.73	0.63	0.57	0.51	1.40	1.27	1.24	1.25	1.27	1.40						1.20	1.12		17	20			IATA
Iceland	PLAY		1.65	1.52	0.79	0.10	—															—	—			
Ukraine	Windrose							1.44	1.30													12	19			

== See also ==
- List of airlines of Europe
- World's largest airlines
- List of largest airlines in North America
- List of largest airlines in Central America & the Caribbean
- List of largest airlines in Africa
- List of largest airlines in Asia
- List of largest airlines in South America
- List of largest airlines in Oceania
