= List of defunct airlines of Africa =

This is a list of defunct airlines of Africa.

== Eritrea ==
Defunct airlines of Eritrea include:

Airline	Image	IATA	ICAO	Callsign	Commenced operations	Ceased operations	Notes
Air Eritrea					2007	2007	
Eritrean Airlines					1991	1998	Renamed to Red Sea Air
Nasair		UE	NAS	NASAIRWAYS	2006	2014	
Red Sea Air		7R			1993	1995	
Red Sea Air		7R	ERS	ERITREAN REDSEA	1998	2000	

== Mauritius ==
Defunct airlines of Mauritius include:

Airline	Image	IATA	ICAO	Callsign	Commenced operations	Ceased operations	Notes
Catovair		MV	IBL	CATOVAIR	2005	2008	

== Réunion ==
Defunct airlines of Réunion include:

Airline	Image	IATA	ICAO	Callsign	Commenced operations	Ceased operations	Notes
Air Bourbon		ZN	BUB	BOURBON	2002	2004	
Air Réunion		UU	REU	Réunion Air Svc	1987	1990	renamed/merged to Air Austral
Air Outre Mer		QN	AOM	AOM	1989	1991	Merged with Minerve to form AOM French Airlines
Réunion Air Service		UU	REU		1975	1987	renamed/merged to Air Réunion

== Seychelles ==
Defunct airlines of Seychelles include:

Airline	Image	IATA	ICAO	Callsign	Commenced operations	Ceased operations	Notes
Ligne Aérienne Seychelles		YP			1986	1987	
Seychelles Airlines					1976	1979	renamed/merged to: Seychelles International Airways
Seychelles International Airways		CK	SISAL		1979	1985	renamed/merged to Air Seychelles

== Somalia ==
Defunct airlines of Somalia include:

Airline	Image	IATA	ICAO	Callsign	Commenced operations	Ceased operations	Notes
Air Services International					2002	2004	
Air Shabelle					2016	2017	
Air Somalia			RSM	AIR SOMALIA	2001	2002	
Blue Sky Airlines					2012	2016	Merged with Ocean Airlines to form Blue Ocean
Damal Airlines			DML		1999	2005	Operated Antonov An-24
Gallad Air					2003	2005	
Mudan Airlines			MDN		2005	2006	Operated Antonov An-24
Ocean Airlines					2016	2016	Merged with Blue Sky Airlines to form Blue Ocean
Osob Air			OSB	OSOB	2009	2011	Operated BAC One-Eleven, Boeing 737, Rombac One-Eleven
SomAir					2014	2015	Operated Douglas DC-9
Star African Air			STU		2000	2009	

== South Sudan ==
Defunct airlines of South Sudan include:

Airline	Image	IATA	ICAO	Callsign	Commenced operations	Ceased operations	Notes
Feeder Airlines			FDD		2007	2013	Rebranded as South Supreme Airlines
Southern Star Airlines		4P			2011	2011	
South Supreme Airlines					2013	2017	

== See also ==
- List of airlines of Africa
- List of largest airlines in Africa
