= Largest airlines in the world =

Largest public owned airlines in the world

The largest airlines in the world can be measured in several ways. As of 2026, United Airlines was the largest in terms of available seat miles (ASM), revenue seat miles (RPM), mainline fleet size, the number of both mainline employees and destinations served; Delta Air Lines was the most valuable by revenue, assets, market capitalization, and brand value; American Airlines Group carries the most passengers and has the most employees when American Eagle is included; FedEx Express carries the most freight in tonne-kilometers; Southwest Airlines has the greatest number of routes; and Turkish Airlines serves the most countries.

== Financials ==
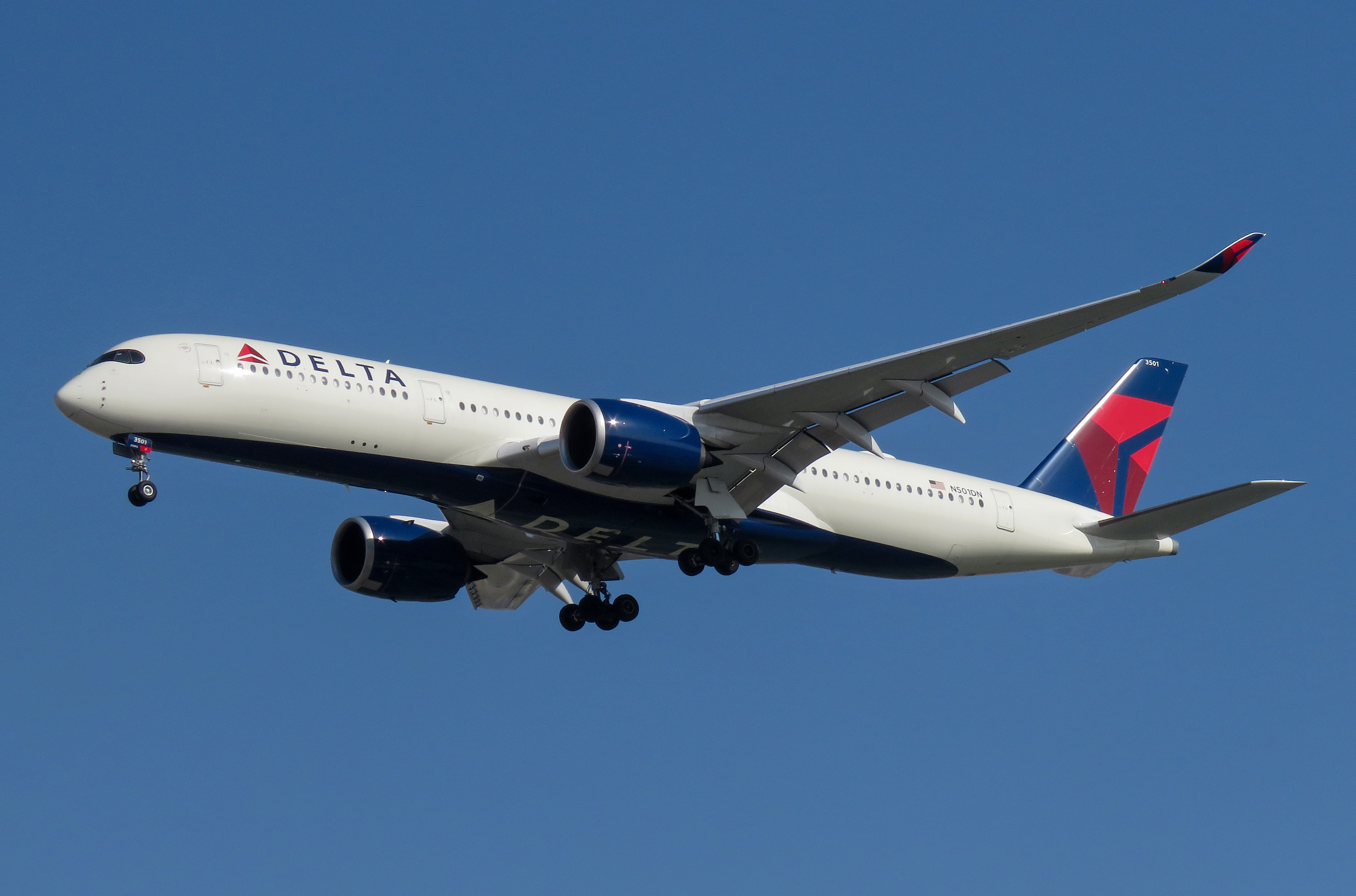
Delta Air Lines ranks first by revenue, net income, total assets, market capitalization and brand value.

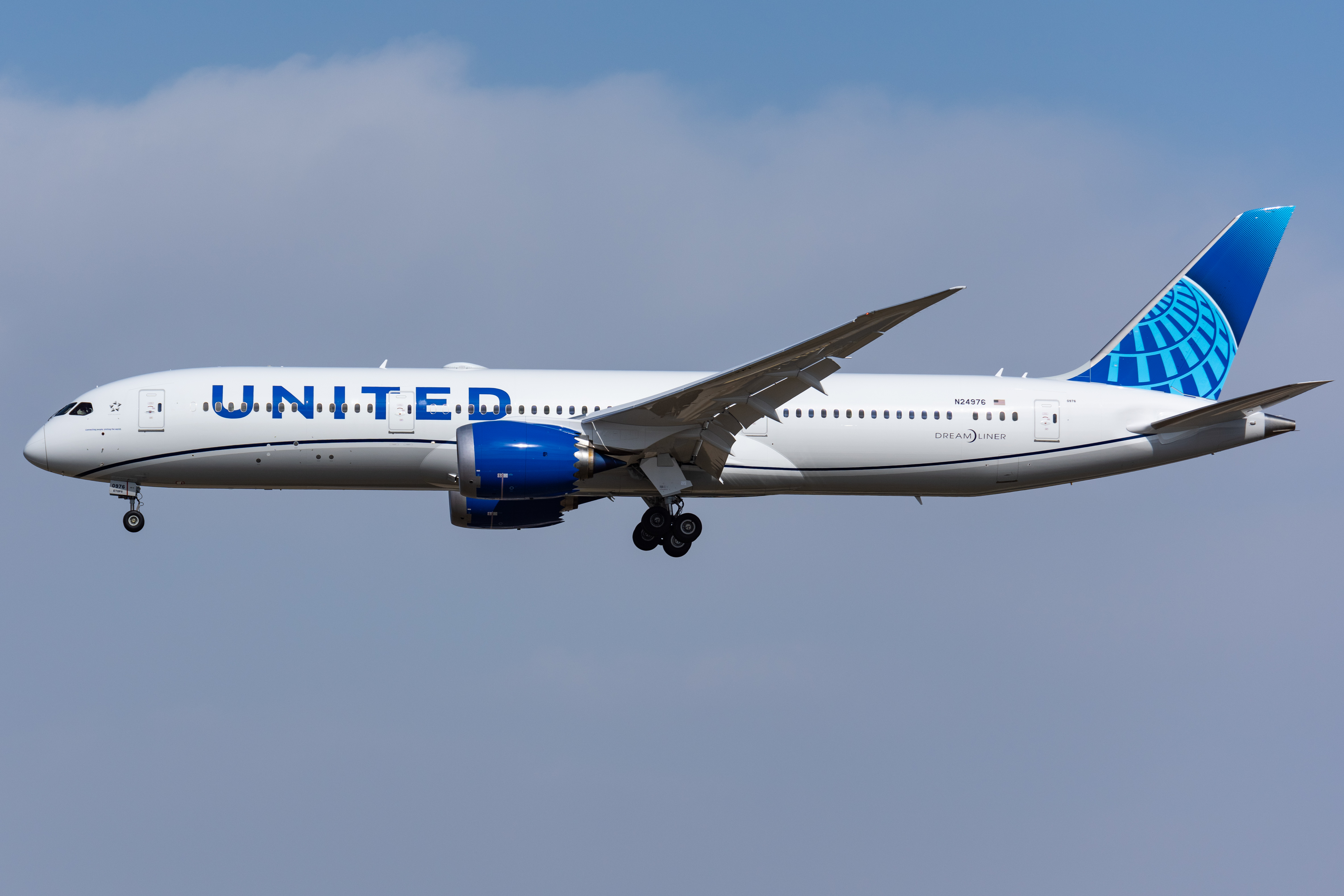
United Airlines ranks first in ASM, RPM, fleet size and number of both destinations and employees.

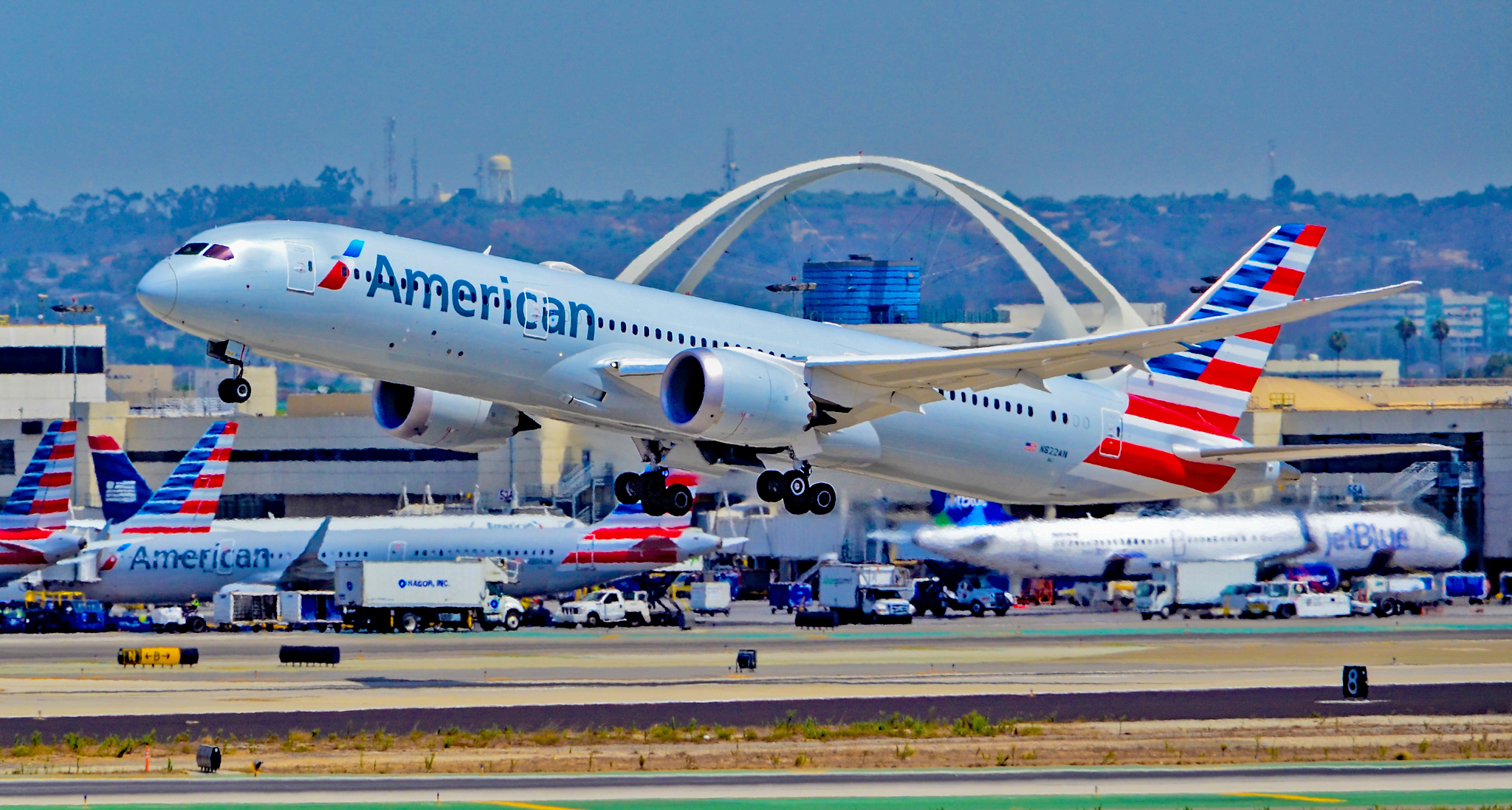
American Airlines Group ranks first by number of passengers carried.

=== Revenue ===
2025 rank	Airline group	Country	Revenue (in US$ billion)
1	Delta Air Lines	United States	63.3
2	United Airlines	United States	59.0
3	American Airlines Group	United States	54.6
4	Lufthansa Group	Germany	45.7
5	International Airlines Group	United Kingdom / Spain	38.3
6	Air France–KLM	France / Netherlands	35.5
7	Southwest Airlines	United States	28.0
8	China Southern Airlines	China	24.4
9	Turkish Airlines	Turkey	24.1
10	Air China	China	23.4

Note that Emirates is a state-owned company, and is thus not included in this list of public companies. Its 2024 revenue was estimated to be around $37.4 billion. Qatar Airways is privately held with its 2024 revenue of around $22.2 billion.

=== Earnings ===
2025 Rank	Airline Group	Country	Earnings (US$ billion)
1	Delta Air Lines	United States	6.8
2	United Airlines	United States	5.4
3	International Airlines Group	United Kingdom / Spain	5.2
4	Turkish Airlines	Turkey	2.9
5	Lufthansa Group	Germany	2.9
6	Ryanair Group	Ireland	2.9
7	Singapore Airlines	Singapore	2.2
8	LATAM Airlines	Chile / Brasil	2.2
9	American Airlines Group	United States	1.9
10	Air France–KLM	France / The Netherlands	1.7

=== Market capitalization (June 2026) ===
Rank	Airline Group	Country	Market cap (US$ billion)
1	Delta Air Lines	United States	54.56
2	United Airlines	United States	37.49
3	Ryanair Group	Ireland	31.41
4	International Airlines Group	United Kingdom/Spain	24.03
5	Southwest Airlines	United States	22.22
6	IndiGo	India	19.92
7	Air China	China	19.77
8	Singapore Airlines	Singapore	17.62
9	LATAM Airlines	Chile	15.58
10	China Southern Airlines	China	14.64

=== Brand value ===
2025 Rank	Airline	Country	$bn	Year-to-year change
1	Delta Air Lines	United States	14.9	+38.3%
2 ▲	United Airlines	United States	12.3	+41.8%
3 ▼	American Airlines	United States	11.7	+14.2%
4	Emirates	United Arab Emirates	8.4	+27.1%
5	Southwest Airlines	United States	6.3	+16.8%
6	British Airways	United Kingdom	4.6	+44.9%
7 ▲	China Southern Airlines	China	4.1	+48.2%
8 ▼	Qatar Airways	Qatar	3.9	+24.3%
9 ▼	Air Canada	Canada	3.26	+14.1%
10	China Eastern Airlines	China	3.2	+26.0%

== Capacity ==
=== Airlines by available seat miles (ASMs) ===
Numbers are listed in billions of available seat miles.

Rank	Airline	Country	2025	2024	2023	2022	2021	2020	2019	Ref
1	United Airlines	United States	330	311	291	248	179	123	285	
2	American Airlines	United States	299	293	278	260	215	143	285	
3	Delta Air Lines	United States	298	288	272	233	194	134	275	
4	Emirates	United Arab Emirates		222	230	177	99	40	228	
5	Southwest Airlines	United States	180	178	170	148	132	103	157	
6	Qatar Airways	Qatar		159	157	131	100	58	149	
7	Ryanair	Ireland		159	152	138	91	30	118	
8	China Southern Airlines	China		151	197	96	133	134	214	
9	Turkish Airlines	Turkey		145	146	124	80	47	117	
10	China Eastern Airlines	China		138	114	60	100	95	168	

=== Airline groups by passengers (millions) ===
Rank	Airline Group	Country	2024	2023	2022	2021	2020	2019
1	American Airlines Group	United States	225	211	199	124	95	215
2	Delta Air Lines	United States	200	190	175	123	80	204
3	Ryanair Holdings	Ireland	184	182	168	97	52	148
4	United Airlines	United States	174	165	144	73	57	162
5	Southwest Airlines	United States	140	137	157	123	67	162
6	Lufthansa Group	Germany	131	123	101	24	36	145
7	International Airlines Group	United Kingdom / Spain	122	115	95	31 #12	118	112
8	IndiGo	India	119	105	75	48	35 #11	
9	Air France–KLM	France / Netherlands	98	118	83		28 #14	
10	Turkish Airlines	Turkey	83	83	72	45	28 #17=	

=== Freight (millions of CTK) ===
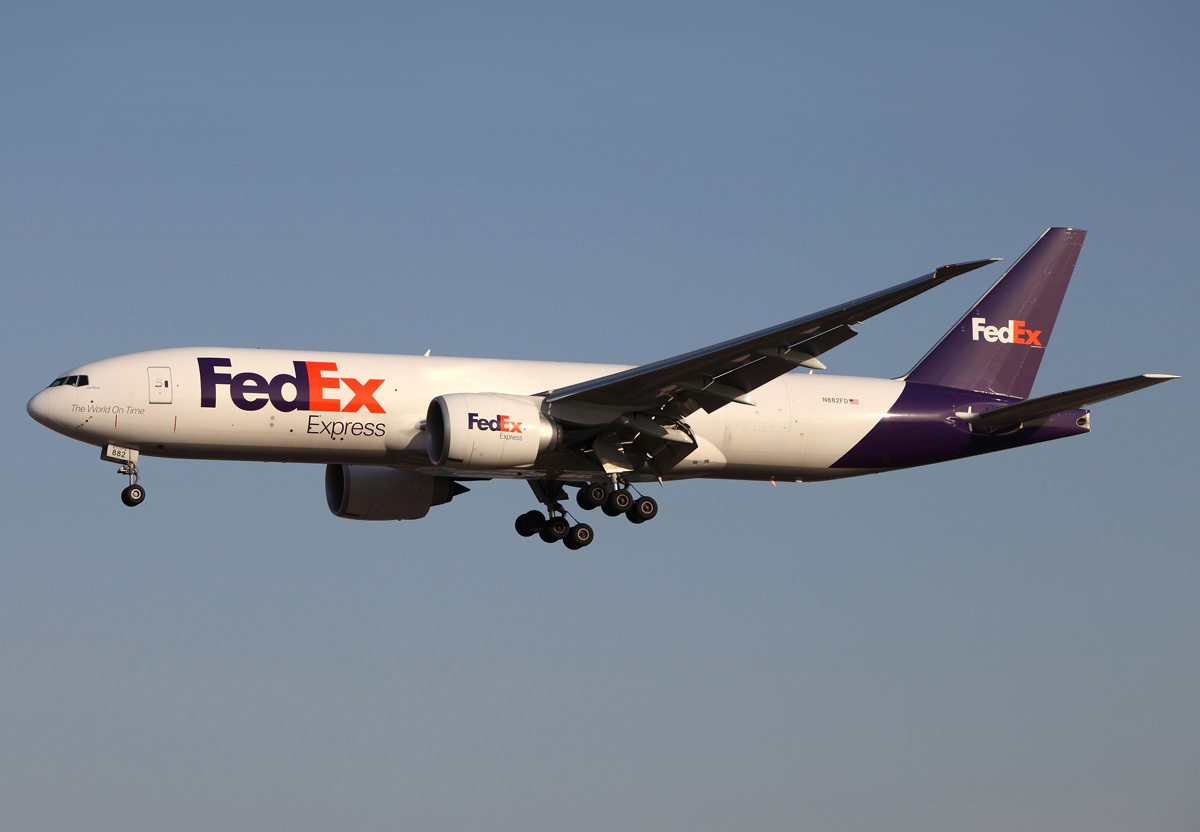
FedEx Express is the largest by freight tonne-kilometers.

Rank	Airline	Country / Region	2024	2023	2022	2021	2020	2019	2018
1	FedEx Express	United States	18,133	17,923	19,547	20,660	19,656	17,503	17,499
2	Qatar Airways Cargo	Qatar	15,211	14,406	14,267	16,102	13,740	13,024	12,695
3	UPS Airlines	United States	15,094	14,239	15,889	15,529	14,371	12,842	12,459
4	Emirates SkyCargo	United Arab Emirates	12,354	10,636	10,153	11,842	9,569	12,052	12,713
5	Atlas Air	United States	11,942	8,915	8,675	8,441	5,458 #12	4,522 #16	4,553 #16
6	Turkish Cargo	Turkey	10,240	8,325	8,318	9,223	6,977	7,029	5,890
7	Korean Air Cargo	South Korea	8,728	8,411	9,518	10,429	8,104	7,412	7,839
8	China Southern Airlines Cargo	China	8,653	7,610	6,915	8,078	6,591	6,825	6,597
9	Cathay Cargo	Hong Kong	8,503	8,099	5,774 #13	8,215	8,137	10,930	11,284
10	Cargolux	Luxembourg	8,263	6,807	7,971	8,587	7,345	7,180	7,322

== Fleet size ==
=== Aircraft operated (February 2026) ===
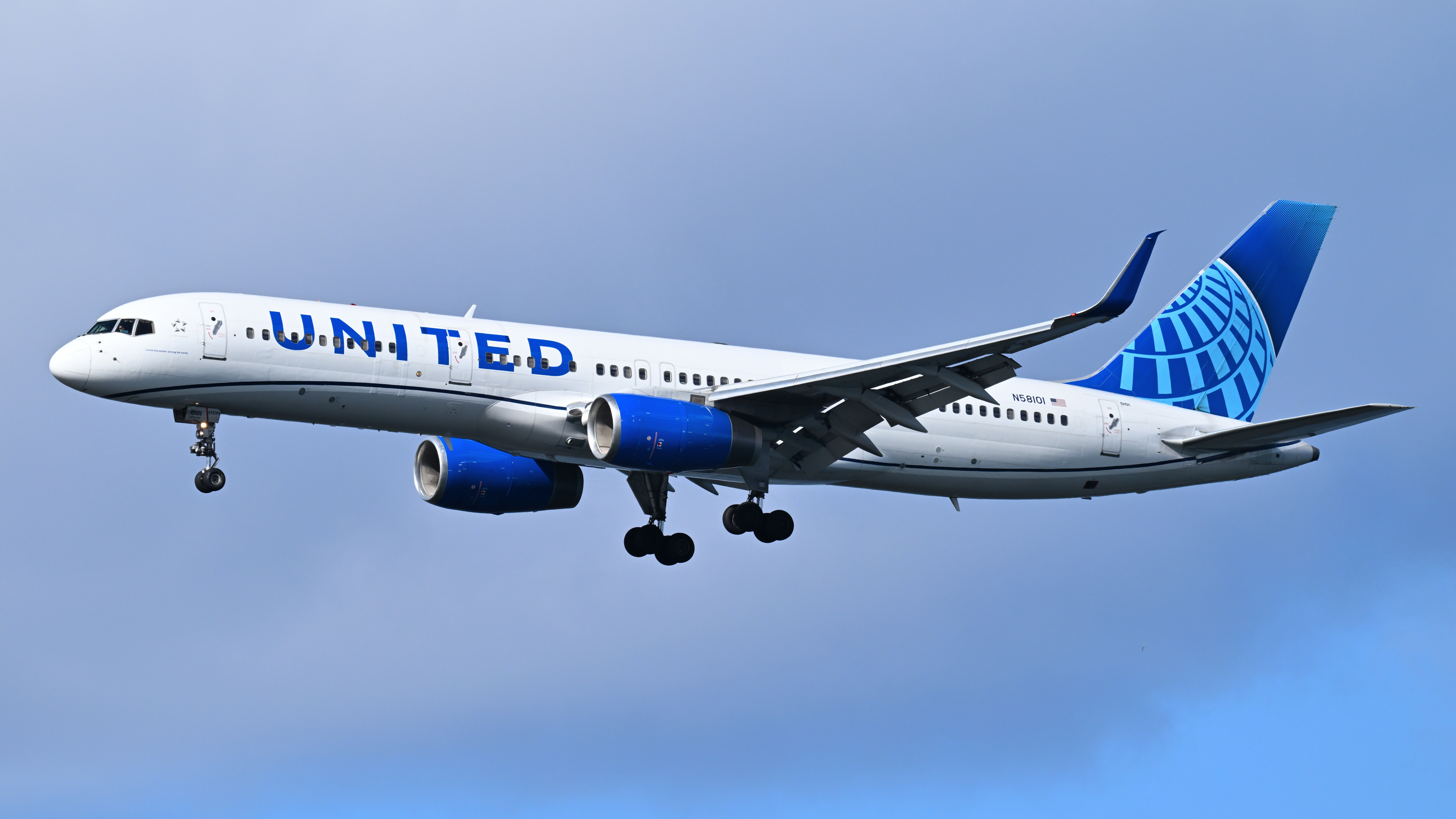
United Airlines operates the largest number of aircraft, as of September 2025.

Rank	Airline	Country	No.	Ref.
1	United Airlines	United States	1,137	
2	American Airlines	United States	1,013	
3	Delta Air Lines	United States	1,004	
4	China Southern Airlines	China	850	
5	Southwest Airlines	United States	810	
6	China Eastern Airlines	China	664	
7	Ryanair	Ireland	647	
8	SkyWest Airlines	United States	579	
9	Turkish Airlines	Turkey	545	
10	Air China	China	510	

== Network ==
=== Destinations served (April 2026) ===
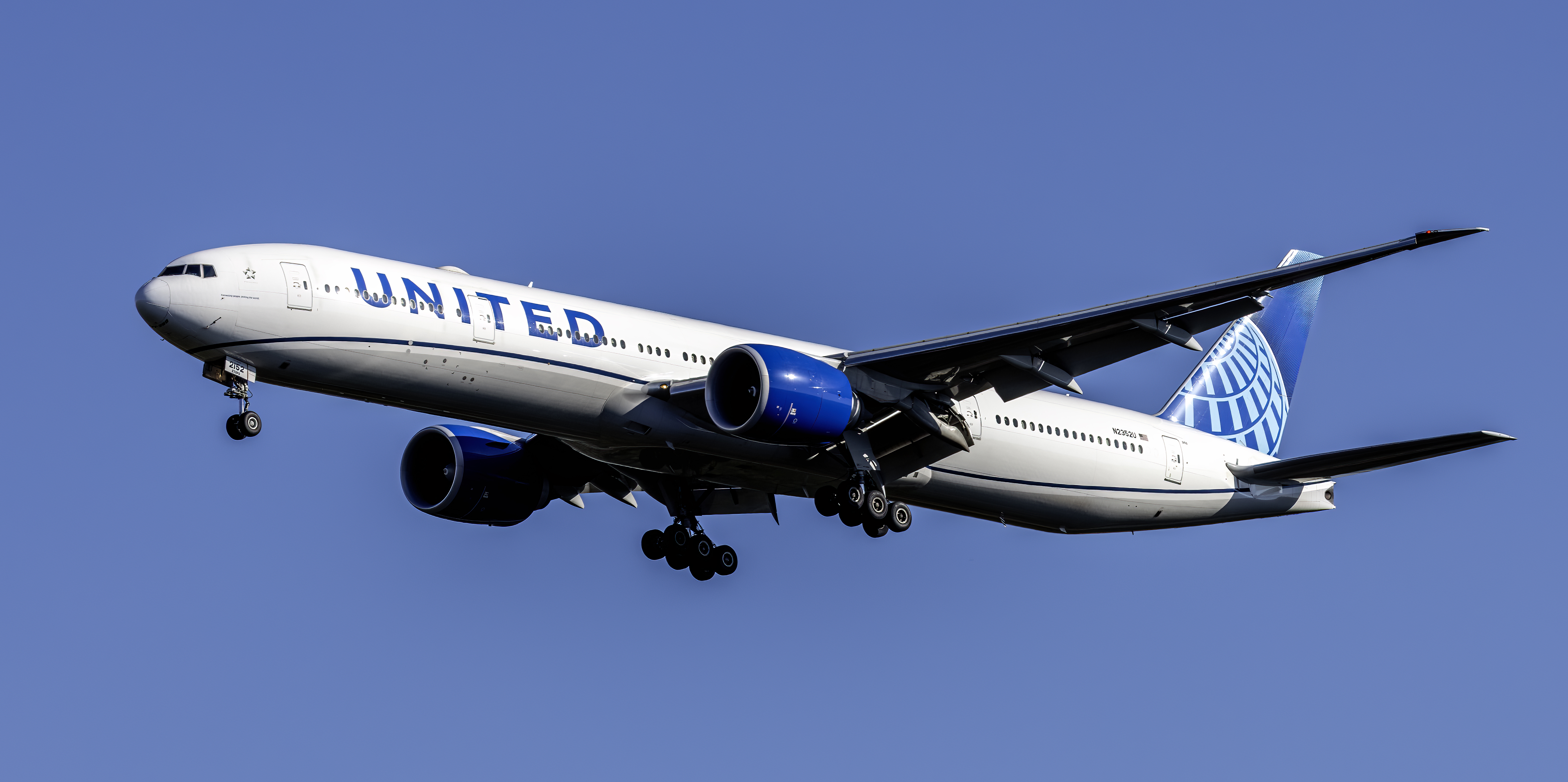
United Airlines serves the largest number of destinations, as of February 2024.

Rank	Airline	Country	No.
1	United Airlines	United States	392
2	American Airlines	United States	367
3	Delta Air Lines	United States	315
4	Turkish Airlines	Turkey	290
5	China Southern Airlines	China	226
6	China Eastern Airlines	China	225
7	Ryanair	Ireland	223
8	Air China	China	213
8	British Airways	United Kingdom	213
10	Air Canada	Canada	204

=== Countries served (April 2026) ===
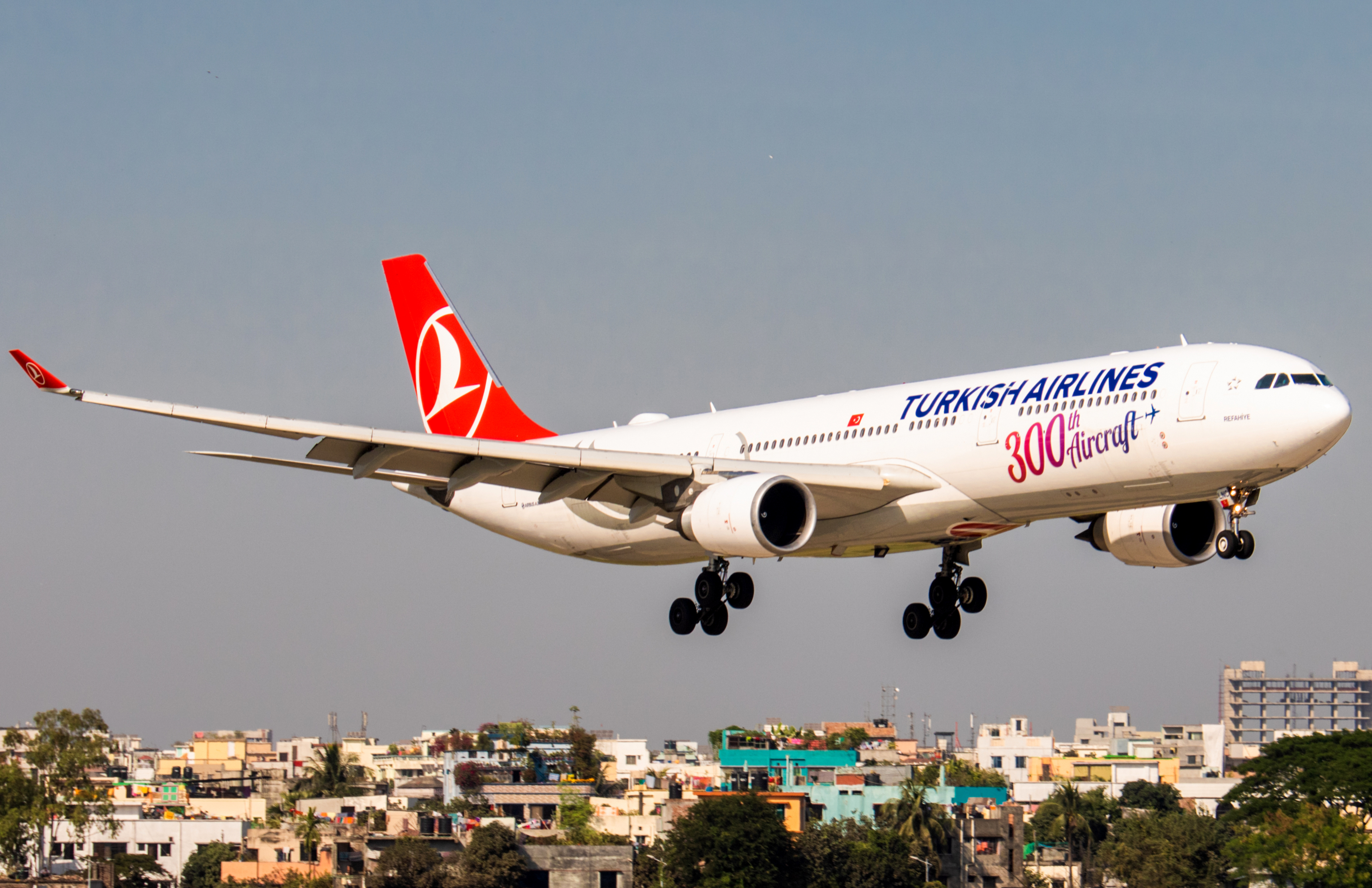
Turkish Airlines serves the largest number of countries

Rank	Airline	Number of Countries	Country of origin
1	Turkish Airlines	130	Turkey
2	Air France	94	France
3	Qatar Airways	92	Qatar
4	Ethiopian Airlines	87	Ethiopia
5	British Airways	79	United Kingdom
5	Emirates	79	United Arab Emirates
7	Lufthansa	76	Germany
8	United Airlines	75	United States
9	KLM	66	Netherlands
10	American Airlines	64	United States
10	Delta Air Lines	64	United States
10	Air Canada	64	Canada

=== Flights daily (March 2025) ===
Rank	Airline	Country	No.
1	American Airlines	United States	5,946
2	Delta Air Lines	United States	4,343
3	United Airlines	United States	4,167
4	Southwest Airlines	United States	3,592
5	Ryanair	Ireland	2,584
6	China Eastern Airlines	China	2,506
7	IndiGo	India	2,244
8	China Southern Airlines	China	2,125
9	Air China	China	1,659
10	easyJet	United Kingdom	1,298

=== Routes served (April 2026) ===
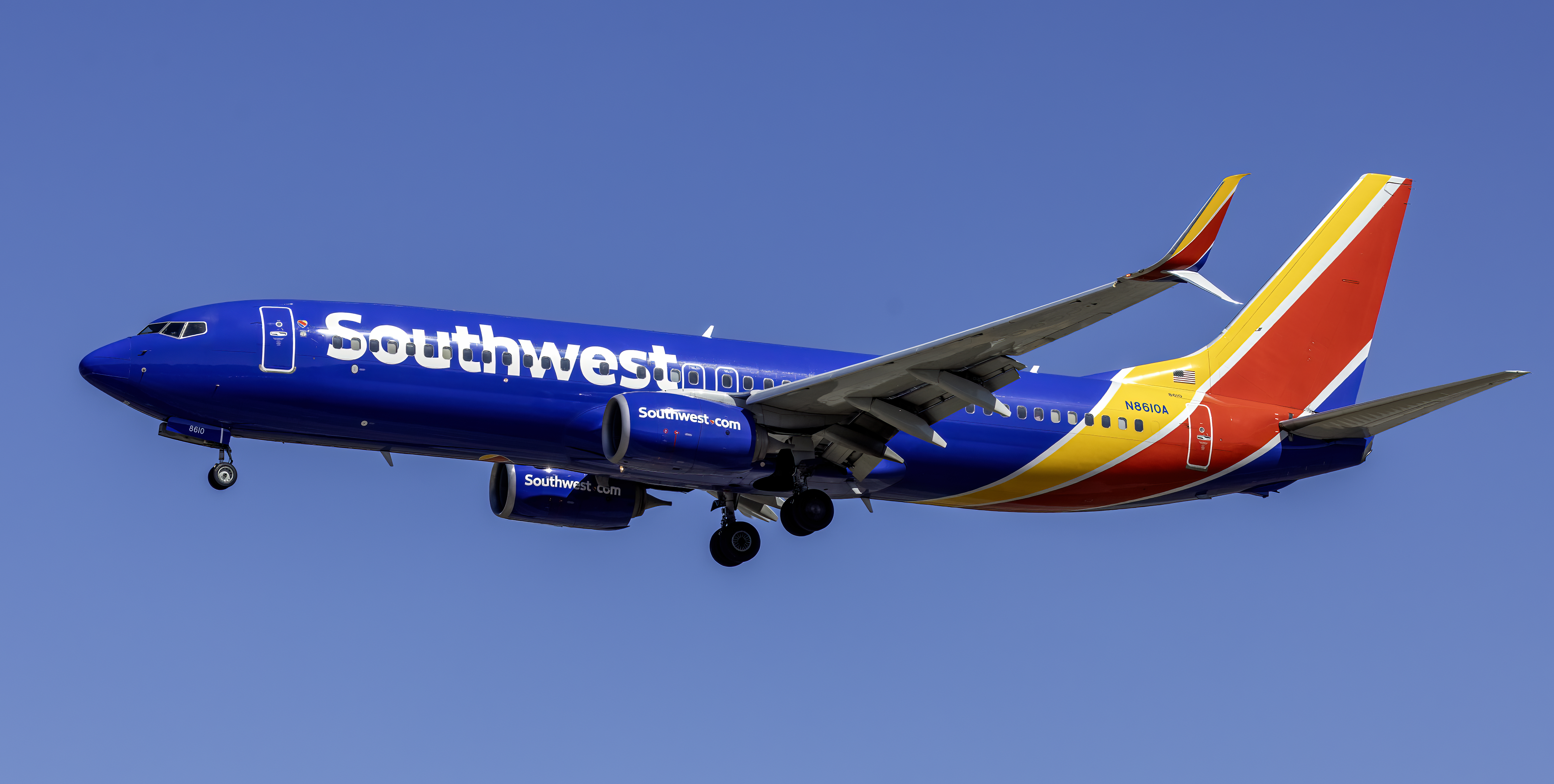
Southwest Airlines serves the largest number of routes, as of February 2024.

Rank	Airline	Country	No.	Ref.
1	Southwest Airlines	United States	2,509	
2	Ryanair (Note: excluding Ryanair UK)	Ireland	2,496	
3	American Airlines	United States	1,391	
4	United Airlines	United States	1,148	
5	Delta Air Lines	United States	1,095	
6	easyJet	United Kingdom	1,207	
7	Wizz Air	Hungary	1,018	
8	China Eastern Airlines	China	923	
9	China Southern Airlines	China	780	
10	IndiGo	India	730	

== See also ==
- Flag carrier
- List of largest airlines in North America
- List of largest airlines in Europe
- List of largest airlines in Central America and the Caribbean
- List of largest airlines in Africa
- List of largest airlines in Asia
- List of largest airlines in South America
- List of largest airlines in Oceania
- List of airline holding companies
- List of the busiest airports in Africa
- List of the busiest airports in Asia
- List of the busiest airports in Europe
- List of the busiest airports in Latin America
- Lists of the busiest airports
- List of busiest airports by passenger traffic
- List of busiest airports by aircraft movements
- List of busiest passenger flight routes
