= Red Sea Air =

Eritrean airline

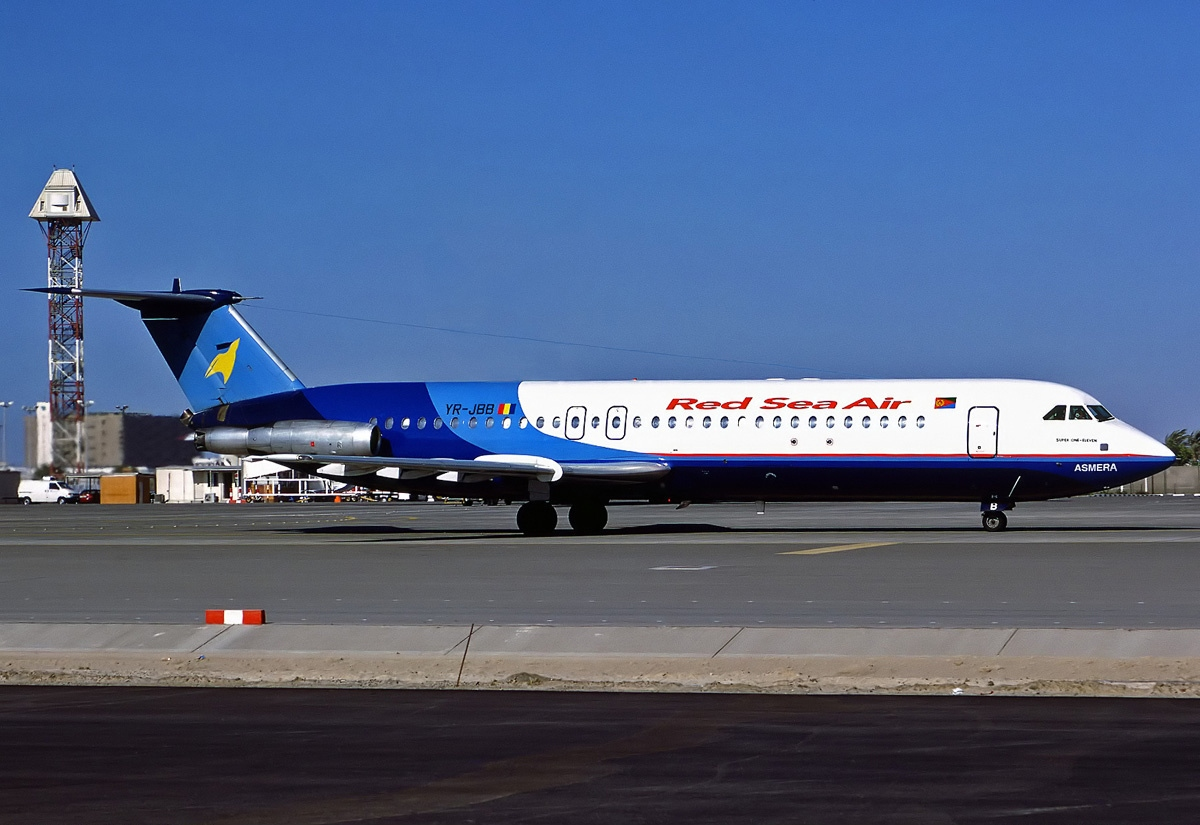
- Red Sea Air BAC One-Eleven at Dubai International Airport
IATA	ICAO	Call sign
7R	ERS	Eritrean Redsea
- Commenced operations: 1988
- Ceased operations: 2000
- Fleet size: BAC 1-11
- Destinations: Asmara, Assab, Massawa
- Parent company: Eritrean Airlines
- Headquarters: Asmara, Eritrea

Red Sea Air was a domestic airline based in Asmara, the capital of Eritrea. It was at one time the national flag carrier. Eritrean Airlines owned 40% of the airline, which operated domestic routes between Asmara, Assab and Massawa. Red Sea Air had a fleet of BAC 1-11s

The airline operated from 1988 to 2000.

== Code data ==
- IATA Code: RS
- ICAO Code: ERS
- Callsign: Eritrean Redsea
