= List of airlines of Svalbard =

This is a list of airlines currently operating in Svalbard.

Airline	Image	IATA	ICAO	Callsign	Service	Notes
Arktikugol					Operates helicopter service	
Lufttransport Svalbard					Operates aircraft service	

== See also ==
- List of airlines
