= Air Bourbon =

2002–2004 airline in Réunion, France

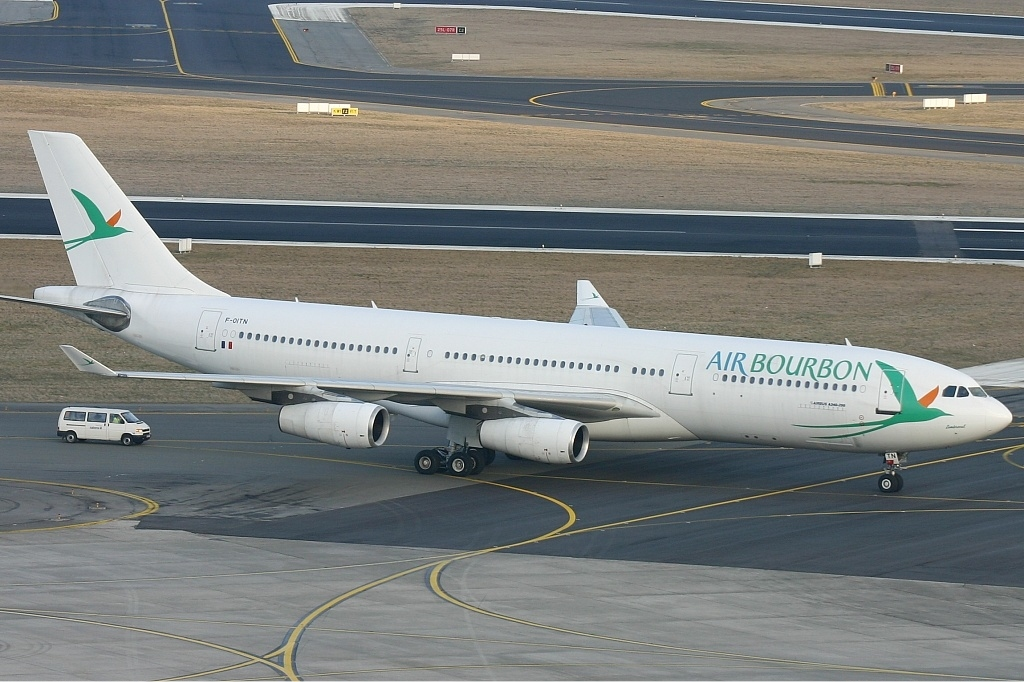
- The airline's sole aircraft, an Airbus A340-200
IATA	ICAO	Call sign
ZB	BUB	BOURBON
- Founded: November 2002
- Commenced operations: June 7, 2003
- Ceased operations: December 8, 2004
- Hubs: Roland Garros Airport
- Fleet size: 1
- Parent company: Group Bourbon
- Headquarters: Sainte Marie, Réunion
- Key people: Érick Lazarus (Founder and CEO)
- Website: air-bourbon.com

Air Bourbon was a short-lived airline headquartered at Roland Garros Airport in Sainte Marie, Réunion.

== History ==
The airline was created by the French company Group Bourbon in November 2002. It started scheduled services to mainland France on June 7, 2003, operating a route to Paris-Orly via Lyon with a single Airbus A340-200 leased from Airbus Asset, equipped with 286 seats. During this time, the airline had up to 196 staff (mostly former Air Lib and Aero Lyon employees), including 21 pilots, 61 cabin crew, and 115 ground staff.

By January 2004, Air Bourbon faced severe financial constraints and announced a major corporate recapitalization program to stay afloat. However, the airline suspended operations on November 26, 2004, and filed for bankruptcy three days later. A receivership was given on December 3 2004 for an intended eight-month protection period, and on December 8 of the same year, the airline was liquidated.

The proposed logo for Air Comores International.

A regional subsidiary named Air Comores International, based in Moroni, Comoros, was planned to operate flights to France in November 2004, using an Airbus A310-300 with 206 seats. However, the plan failed after Air Bourbom went out of business.

== Destinations ==
Air Bourbon operated scheduled services to the following destinations:

Nation	City	Airport	Notes
France	Lyon	Lyon-Saint Exupery Airport	
France	Paris	Charles de Gaulle Airport	
France	Paris	Orly Airport	
Italy	Milan	Milan-Malpensa Airport	
Mayotte	Dzaoudzi	Dzaoudzi-Pamandzi International Airport	
Réunion	Saint Denis	Roland Garros Airport	Hub

== See also ==
- List of defunct airlines of Réunion
