= European Regions Airline Association =

European trade association

- Formation: 1980
- Type: trade association
- Headquarters: West End, Surrey, United Kingdom
- Region served: Europe
- Members: European regional airlines
- Website: www.eraa.org
- Formerly called: European Regional Airlines Association

The European Regions Airline Association is a trade association of European regional airlines and associated businesses. It was founded as the European Regional Airlines Association in 1980, by a small number of what were then known as commuter airlines. The association is registered in England and Wales.

== History ==
The European Regions Airline Association was founded as the European Regional Airlines Association in 1980, by a small number of what were then known as commuter airlines. The association is registered as a limited company in England and Wales, with an office in Brussels, Belgium.

== Awards ==
The association makes an annual regional "Airport of the Year" award, which in 2016 was given to Southampton Airport, in Hampshire in southern England.
