= List of largest airlines in Central America and the Caribbean =

This is a list of largest airlines in Central America and the Caribbean. It is ranked by number of transported passengers.

== By passengers carried (millions) ==
| Rank | Country | Airline / holding | '24 | '23 | '22 | '21 | '20 | '19 | '18 | '17 | '16 | '15 | '14 | '13 | '12 | '11 | '10 | '09 | Passenger fleet | Current destinations | Sources | Alliance / association |
|---|---|---|---|---|---|---|---|---|---|---|---|---|---|---|---|---|---|---|---|---|---|---|
| 1 | Panama | Copa Airlines | - | 16.1 | 15.7 | 9.5 | - | 15.4 | 15.1 | 14.2 | 12.8 | 11.8 | 11.6 | 11.3 | 10.2 | 3.7 | 3.3 | 3.8 | 91 | 65 | | Star Alliance |
| 2 | Trinidad and Tobago | Caribbean Airlines ^{1} | | | | | | | | | | | - | - | - | - | - | - | 19 | 18 | - | - |
| 3 | France | Air Caraïbes | - | 1.5 | - | - | - | 1.7 | - | 1.5 | 1.4 | 1.2 | 1.2 | 1.2 | 1.2 | - | - | - | 15 | 13 | | - |
| 4 | Dominican Republic | Arajet | - | - | - | - | - | - | - | - | - | - | - | - | - | - | - | - | 10 | 22 | - | |
| 5 | Turks and Caicos Islands | InterCaribbean Airways | | | | | | | | | | | - | - | - | - | - | - | 14 | 23 | - | - |
| 6 | Cuba | Cubana de Aviación | | | | | | | | | | | - | - | - | - | - | - | 20 | 20 | - | - |
| 7 | France | Air Antilles | | | | | | | | | | | - | - | - | - | - | - | 9 | 22 | - | - |
| 8 | Cayman Islands | Cayman Airways | | | | | | | | | | | - | - | - | - | - | - | 6 | 12 | - | - |
| 9 | Bahamas | Bahamasair | | | | | | | | | | | - | - | - | - | - | - | 9 | 21 | - | - |
| 10 | Sint Maarten | Winair | | | | | | | | | | | - | - | - | - | - | - | 8 | 16 | - | - |
| 11 | Bahamas | Western Air | | | | | | | | | | | - | - | - | - | - | - | 6 | 9 | - | - |
| 12 | France | St Barth Commuter | | | | | | | | | | | - | - | - | - | - | - | 5 | 4 | - | - |
| 13 | France | Air Guyane Express | | | | | | | | | | | - | - | - | - | - | - | 3 | 8 | - | - |
| 14 | Aruba | Aruba Airlines | | | | | | | | | | | - | - | - | - | - | - | 2 | 8 | - | - |
| 15 | Bermuda | BermudAir | | | | | | | | | | | - | - | - | - | - | - | 2 | 14 | - | - |

== See also ==
- Largest airlines in the world
- List of the busiest airports in South America
- World's largest airlines
- List of largest airlines in Europe
- List of largest airlines in North America
- List of largest airlines in Africa
- List of largest airlines in Asia
- List of largest airlines in South America
- List of largest airlines in Oceania

== Notes ==
- ^1 Includes figures for Air Jamaica.
