= List of defunct airlines of Europe =

This is a list of defunct airlines of Europe.

== Kosovo ==
Defunct airlines of Kosovo include;

Airline	Image	IATA	ICAO	Callsign	Commenced operations	Ceased operations	Notes
Airkosova			ILY		2000	2000	
Illyrian Airways			ILY		2010	2011	

== Montenegro ==
Defunct airlines of Montenegro include;

Airline	Image	IATA	ICAO	Callsign	Commenced operations	Ceased operations	Notes
Air Montenegro			AMN		1991	1992	
MontAir					2010	2010	Formed by Dubrovnik Airline, using their AOC. Started charter operations in March 2010 from Skopje, North Macedonia awaiting its Montenegro licence, but ceased services a few weeks later.
Montenegro Airlines		YM	MGX	MONTENEGRO	1997	2020	

== Nagorno-Karabakh ==
Defunct airlines of Nagorno-Karabakh include;

Airline	Image	IATA	ICAO	Callsign	Commenced operations	Ceased operations	Notes
Artsakh Air					2011		

== Northern Cyprus ==
Defunct airlines of Northern Cyprus include;

Airline	Image	IATA	ICAO	Callsign	Commenced operations	Ceased operations	Notes
Cyprus Turkish Airlines		YK	KYV	AIRKIBRIS	1975	2010	
Karpas Airlines							Not launched
North Cyprus Airlines					2011	2013	Never launched

== See also ==
- List of airlines of Europe
- Babyflot
