= List of largest airlines in North America =

These are lists of the largest airlines in North America, ranked by several metrics.

== By available seat miles ==
Numbers are listed in billions of available seat miles (ASM)

Rank	Airline	Country	2025	2024	2023	2022	2021	2020	2019	Ref
1	United Airlines	United States	330	311	291	248	179	123	285	
2	American Airlines	United States	299	293	278	260	215	143	285	
3	Delta Air Lines	United States	298	288	272	233	194	134	275	
4	Southwest Airlines	United States	180	178	170	148	132	103	157	
5	Air Canada	Canada	105	104	99					
6	Alaska Airlines	United States	100	76	69	61	53	37	67	
7	JetBlue	United States	65	66	68	65	54	33	64	
8	Spirit Airlines†	United States	40	53	56	49	41	28	42	
9	Frontier Airlines	United States	40	40	38					
10	Sun Country Airlines	United States	8	8	7	1	1	4	6	

Notes

- † Spirit Airlines ceased operations in May 2026.

== By passengers carried ==
This is a list of North America's largest passenger airlines in terms of enplaned passengers. Passenger numbers shown are inclusive of regional carriers operating under contract where applicable.

Airlines	Country	2025	2024	2023	2022	2021	2020	2019	Ref
American Airlines	United States	223,540,000	226,405,000	210,692,000	199,288,000	165,682,000	95,324,000	215,182,000	
Delta Air Lines	United States	200,000,000	200,000,000	190,000,000	177,000,000	TBA	TBA	204,000,000	
United Airlines	United States	181,053,000	173,603,000	164,927,000	144,300,000	104,082,000	57,761,000	162,443,000	
Southwest Airlines	United States	168,334,000	175,466,000	171,817,000	156,982,000	123,264,000	67,785,000	162,681,000	
Alaska Airlines	United States	58,627,000	49,238,000	44,557,000	41,468,000	32,407,000	17,927,000	46,733,000	
Air Canada	Canada	45,297,000	45,886,000	44,790,000	36,144,000	13,192,000	13,760,000	51,543,000	
Spirit Airlines†	United States	32,031,000	44,180,000	44,105,000	38,463,000	30,828,000	18,746,000	34,537,000	
JetBlue Airways	United States	39,336,000	40,498,000	42,534,000	39,562,000	30,094,000	14,274,000	42,727,694	
Frontier Airlines	United States	33,200,000	33,296,000	30,218,000	25,486,000	20,708,000	13,065,000	21,869,000	
Volaris	Mexico	TBA	29,473,000	33,497,000	31,051,000	24,405,000	14,100,000	21,975,000	
Viva	Mexico	TBA	27,695,000	24,992,000	20,698,000	15,268,000	8,123,000	12,019,114	
WestJet	Canada	TBA	TBA	TBA	TBA	TBA	TBA	TBA	
Aeroméxico	Mexico	TBA	25,337,000	24,760,000	21,724,000	16,553,000	9,484,000	20,689,000	
Allegiant Air	United States	18,518,653	16,764,283	17,143,870	16,630,138	13,509,544	8,553,623	14,823,267	
Hawaiian Airlines‡	United States	—N/a	TBA	10,879,000	10,015,000	6,543,000	3,363,000	11,751,003	
Flair Airlines	Canada	TBA	TBA	4,500,000	—N/a	—N/a	—N/a	—N/a	
Sun Country Airlines	United States	4,205,847	4,483,515	4,140,663	3,598,584	2,733,364	1,740,000	3,127,000	

Notes

- † Spirit Airlines ceased operations in May 2026.
- ‡ Hawaiian Airlines became a subsidiary of Alaska Airlines in 2025.

== By number of destinations ==
This is a list of airlines ranked by number of destinations (as of March 2021 for rankings #1–16 and #21; as of February 2025 for #17–19 and #22; as of February 2026 for #20 and #23, as of November 2026 for #13):

Airline	Destinations			
Airline	Domestic	International	Total	Ref
United Airlines	240	151	391	
American Airlines	233	134	367	
Delta Air Lines	212	103	315	
Air Canada	48	156	204	
Alaska Airlines	111	31	142	
WestJet	43	96	139	
Allegiant Air	126	0	126	
Southwest Airlines	106	16	122	
JetBlue	67	47	114	
Aeromexico	48	55	103	
Frontier Airlines	81	18	99	
Sun Country Airlines	74	18	92	
Breeze Airways	83	6	83	
Air Transat	10	64	74	
Volaris	44	26	70	
Viva	44	19	63	
Porter Airlines	24	22	46	
Avelo Airlines	31	1	32	
Flair Airlines	16	12	28	
Canadian North	28	0	28	
Hawaiian Airlines	18	9	27	
Mexicana de Aviación	15	0	15	
Air North	13	0	13	

== By frequency ==
This is a list of airlines ranked by daily flights (frequency):

Airline	Daily departures	Ref
American Airlines	5,946	
Delta Air Lines	4,343	
United Airlines	4,167	
Southwest Airlines	3,592	
Air Canada	1,500	
Alaska Airlines	1,200	
JetBlue	925	
WestJet	777	
Aeromexico	600	
Frontier Airlines	500	
Allegiant Air	242	
Hawaiian Airlines	212	
Volaris	200	
Viva	115	
Breeze Airways	105	
Sun Country Airlines	47	

== See also ==
- Major airlines of the United States
- World's largest airlines
- List of largest airlines in Europe
- List of largest airlines in Central America & the Caribbean
- List of largest airlines in Africa
- List of largest airlines in Asia
- List of largest airlines in South America
- List of largest airlines in Oceania
