= List of largest airlines in South America =

This is a list of largest airlines active in South America (beyond 100 thousand passengers/year). It is ranked by number of carried passengers.

== By passengers carried (millions) ==
Rank	Origin	Airline/ holding	'25	'24	'23	'22	'21	'20	'19	'18	'17	'16	'15	'14	'13	'12	'11	'10	'09	'08	'07	Passenger fleet	Alliance
1	(Chile) (Brazil)	LATAM ^{1}	87.41	82.00	73.89	62.46	40.19	28.30	74.18	68.80	67.1	66.9	67.8	67.8	66.7	65.0	60.3	51.8	45.8	43.4	38.9	380	N/A
2	(Colombia) (El Salvador)	Avianca Group ^{3}	36.94	37.77	31.95	24.99	14.15	7.88	30.53	30.50	29.4	29.4	28.3	26.2	24.6	23.1	20.8	11.7	10.2	9.0	8.3	161	Star Alliance
3	(Brazil)	Gol Transportes Aéreos ^{2}	34.50	29.89	30.97	27.26	18.96	16.78	36.44	33.41	32.4	32.3	38.8	39.7	36.3	39.2	36.2	32.9	28.4	25.6	23.7	146	N/A
4	(Brazil)	Azul Brazilian Airlines ^{5}	31.91	30.87	29.28	27.48	23.31	14.80	27.67	24.15	20.7	19.8	20.5	20.0	18.3	15.8	11.4	6.6	3.7	1.4	0.4	201	N/A
5	(Chile)	JetSmart ^{6}	14.56	8.12	7.59	5.22	2.56	1.74	4.45	1.89	0.33	-	-	-	-	-	-	-	-	-	-	56	N/A
6	(Argentina)	Aerolíneas Argentinas ^{4}	13.08	13.05	13.85	11.45	4.83	3.10	13.33	13.03	12.83	11.25	10.44	9.22	8.28	6.80	6.12	6.34	5.33	5.49	6.33	81	SkyTeam
7	(Chile)	SKY Airline ^{8}	8.27	8.82	8.46	7.12	3.65	2.64	5.77	4.20	3.81	3.22	2.94	2.74	2.46	1.92	1.54	1.18	0.93	0.81	0.67	36	N/A
8	(Bolivia)	Boliviana de Aviación	4.38	5.06	4.73	4.30	3.29	1.80	3.67	3.64	3.22	2.95	2.49	1.9	1.66	-	-	-	-	-	-	17	N/A
9	(Colombia)	Wingo ^{10}	3.65	3.11	2.83	2.08	1.43	0.74	2.40	2.39	2.13	1.95	1.96	2.22	2.70	2.86	2.84	2.86	2.50	2.16	2.27	10	N/A
10	(Argentina)	Flybondi	3.57	3.88	4.00	2.36	0.89	0.33	1.51	0.76	-	-	-	-	-	-	-	-	-	-	-	11	N/A
11	(Colombia)	Clic Air	1.64	1.77	1.82	1.92	1.42	0.73	2.00	1.21	0.99	0.96	0.93	0.79	0.74	0.63	0.53	0.36	0.28	0.18	0.01	21	N/A
12	(Colombia)	SATENA	1.48	1.27	1.21	1.04	0.89	0.41	1.14	1.12	1.03	0.98	1.01	0.93	0.79	0.75	0.82	0.98	0.96	1.01	1.04	21	N/A
13	(Peru)	Star Perú	1.11	1.00	0.90	0.89	0.55	0.29	0.42	0.32	0.37	0.49	0.59	0.62	0.62	0.78	0.84	0.66	0.50	0.53	0.53	8	N/A
14	(Bolivia)	Ecojet	0.28	0.34	0.39	0.25	0.27	0.14	0.46	0.41	-	-	-	-	-	-	-	-	-	-	-	4	N/A
15	(Argentina)	Andes	0.23	0.21	0.15	0.03	0.0	0.0	0.4														N/A
16	(Peru)	Atsa	0.19	0.18	0.16	0.14	0.12	0.05	0.13	0.09	0.07	0.05	0.04	0.05	0.04	0.09	0.06	0.04	0.03	0.04	0.03	6	N/A

== See also ==
- World's largest airlines
- List of largest airlines in Europe
- List of largest airlines in Central America & the Caribbean
- List of largest airlines in Africa
- List of largest airlines in Asia
- List of largest airlines in North America
- List of largest airlines in Oceania

== Notes ==
- ^1 Includes LAN Airlines and TAM Airlines.
- ^2 Includes Gol Transportes Aéreos and Varig.
- ^3 Includes Avianca Colombia, Avianca Peru, Avianca El Salvador, Avianca Costa Rica, Avianca Ecuador, Avianca Nicaragua, Avianca Honduras and Avianca Guatemala.
- ^4 Includes Austral Líneas Aéreas.
- ^5 Includes TRIP Linhas Aéreas.
- ^6 Includes JetSmart Argentina and Norwegian Air Argentina.
- ^7 Includes VivaAir Colombia and Viva Air Peru.
- ^8 Includes Sky Airline Peru
- ^9 Includes MAP Linhas Aéreas
- ^10 Includes Aerorepública and Copa Airlines Colombia (subsidiary of Copa Airlines)

Information was updated on July, 2026.

Ecuador, Paraguay and Uruguay have no airline relevant to the South America market. Venezuela's information is not available

== Sources ==
Countries (every airline not listed below) Argentina (ANAC), Brazil (ANAC), Bolivia (DGAC), Chile (JAC), Colombia (Aeronáutica Civil), Ecuador (DGAC), Paraguay (DINAC), Peru (MTC), Uruguay (DINACIA)

Airlines Avianca Holdings LATAM Group Gol Linhas Aéreas Inteligentes Azul Linhas Aéreas
