= List of largest airlines in Africa =

Even though Africa is the second largest continent by size and population, its airlines account for only about 6% of the world's air traffic, as most of it is being carried out by foreign air lines.

This is a list of the largest airlines in Africa. It is ranked by number of transported passengers.

== By passengers carried (millions) ==
Rank	Country	Airline	'25	'24	'23	'22	'21	'20	'19	'18	'17	'16	'15	'14	'13	'12	'11	'10	'09	'08	Source
1	Ethiopia	Ethiopian Airlines^{1}	19.0	17.1	13.8	8.6	5.7	9.6	12.1	10.6	8.7	7.6	6.3	5.9	5.2	4.6	3.7	3.1	2.8	2.5	
2	South Africa	South African Airways^{2}									9.7	9.9	9.2	9.3	8.8	8.1	8.0	8.0	8.2	8.9	
3	Egypt	Egyptair^{3}									8.5	7.3	7.4	8.2	11.8	8.3	8.0	8.7	7.9	8.2	
4	Morocco	Royal Air Maroc^{4}				5.6	3.4	2.2	7.4	7.3	7.3	6.8	6.1	6.3	5.8	5.6	5.8	6.1			
5	Kenya	Kenya Airways^{5}		5.23	5.0	3.7	2.2	1.8	4.4	4.8	7.9	4.2	4.2	3.7	3.7	3.6	3.1	2.9			
6	Algeria	Air Algérie				4.6	1.9		6.6	6.6	6.3	6.1	5.5	5.2	4.7	4.3	3.7	3.5	3.5	3.2	
7	South Africa	FlySafair						3.0													
8	Nigeria	Air Peace													2.80	2.30					
9	Tunisia	Tunisair^{9}	2.5	2.6						3.8	3.5	3.0	2.8	3.5	3.7	3.8	3.2	3.7			
10	Mauritius	Air Mauritius^{10}							1.724	1.695	1.603	1.499	1.370	1.330	1.297	1.325	1.295	1.133	1.192	1.311	
11	Libya	Libyan Airlines														1.2					
12	Rwanda	RwandAir							1.17	1.14	0.89	0.59	0.60	0.50	0.41	0.36	0.20	1.13			
13	Angola	TAAG Angola Airlines				0.9	0.3	0.4	1.5	1.5	1.4	1.2	1.3		1.3	1.1	0.8	1.1			
14	Libya	Afriqiyah Airways								0.5					1.2	0.8	0.4	2.3	1.4	0.9	
15	Cote d'Ivoire	Air Côte d'Ivoire						0.3	0.76			0.72	0.60	0.40	0.25						
16	Tanzania	Air Tanzania																	0.060	0.207	

== By passenger fleet ==
Rank	Country	Airline	Passenger Fleet	Current Destinations	Alliance / Association
1	Ethiopia	Ethiopian Airlines	170	161 passenger	Star Alliance
2	Egypt	Egyptair	73	93	Star Alliance
3	South Africa	Airlink	70	51	
4	Morocco	Royal Air Maroc	61	108	Oneworld
5	Algeria	Air Algérie	56	78	
6	Egypt	Air Cairo	39	61	
7	Kenya	Kenya Airways	37	44	SkyTeam
8	South Africa	FlySafair	36 (2026)	15 (2026)	
9	South Africa	CemAir	35+ (2026)	15, across South Africa, Botswana, and Zimbabwe (2026)	
10	Tunisia	Tunisair	30	44	
11	Namibia	Westair Aviation	30	10	
12	Angola	TAAG Angola Airlines	28	31	
13	South Africa	South African Airways	20 (2025)	17 (2025)	Star Alliance
14	South Africa	Federal Air	17	7+	Solenta Aviation
15	Nigeria	Air Peace	16	20	
16	Tanzania	Air Tanzania	15	36	
17	Cote d'Ivoire	Air Côte d'Ivoire	14	27	
18	Rwanda	RwandAir	14	25	
19	Mauritius	Air Mauritius	12	14	Vanilla Alliance
20	Libya	Afriqiyah Airways	8	20	
21	Egypt	Petroleum Air Services	8	8	
22	Egypt	AlMasria Universal Airlines	8	5	
23	Libya	Libyan Airlines	7	22	

Notes

- ^1 Based on Fiscal Year ending 7 Jul.
- ^2 Based on Fiscal Year ending 31 Mar. Includes figures for Mango.
- ^3 Includes figures for Air Sinai and EgyptAir Express.
- ^4 Includes figures for Royal Air Maroc Express.
- ^5 Based on Fiscal Year ending 30 Jun. Includes figures for Jambojet.
- ^7 Includes figures for Tunisair Express.
- ^10 Based on Fiscal Year ending 30 Jun.

== See also ==
- List of airlines of Africa
- List of defunct airlines of Africa
- List of the busiest airports in Africa by passenger traffic
- World's largest airlines
- List of largest airlines in Europe
- List of largest airlines in Central America & the Caribbean
- List of largest airlines in North America
- List of largest airlines in Asia
- List of largest airlines in South America
- List of largest airlines in Oceania
