= List of largest airlines in Asia =

This is a list of the largest airlines in Asia by fleet size and total passengers carried in a twelve-month period. The table is updated periodically as and when new monthly data are available. Figures are for individual airlines; aggregate figures for airline groups (airlines and their partners/subsidiaries related by full equity ownership) are shown only when they are officially published. The list excludes companies headquartered on the Asian side of Russia, Turkey and Azerbaijan.

== By passengers carried (millions, 2024 latest available figures) ==
Rank	Country	Airline / holding	'25	'24	'23	'22	'21	'20	'19	'18	'17	'16	'15	'14	'13	'12	'11	'10	Passenger fleet	Current destinations	Sources	Alliance
1	China	China Southern Airlines	174	164.7	142.2	62.6	98.5	96.9	151.6	139.8	126.2	114.6	109.4	100.9	91.8	86.5	80.7	76.4	629	216		—N/a
2	China	Air China (Note: Includes figures for Shenzhen Airlines (including Kunming Airlines), Air Macau and Dalian Airlines.)	160.6	155.3	128.4	38.6	69.0	68.7	115.0	109.7	101.5	96.5	89.8	83.0	77.7	72.4	69.4	60.0	456	201		Star Alliance
3	China	China Eastern Airlines (Note: Includes figures for Shanghai Airlines and China United Airlines.)	149.9	140.6	115.6	42.5	79.0	74.5	130.0	121.1	110.8	101.7	93.8	83.8	79.1	73.1	68.7	64.9	588	248		SkyTeam
4	India	IndiGo	123	114.1	103.5	76.7	48.4	35.0	84.7	61.9	49.2	41.0	29.7	22.8	19.3	15.8	12	8.5	342	122		—N/a
5	India	Air India Limited (Note: Includes figures for Air India Express, AIX Connect, and Vistara.)		63.9	54.5	22.1	14.1	11.3	30.4	28.3	26.4	23.5	18.0	16.7	17.3	16.0	-	15.0	122	102		Star Alliance
6	Malaysia	Air Asia Group (Note: Includes figures for Thai AirAsia, Indonesia AirAsia, Philippines AirAsia, AirAsia Cambodia, AirAsia X and Thai AirAsia X.)	68.6	63.2	57.0	34.2	7.7	22.8	83.5	73.0	63.3	60.1	54.8	48.8	45.2	34.1	29.9	25.7	255	165		—N/a
7	Qatar	Qatar Airways (Note: Based on fiscal year ending 31 March.)		43.1	40.0	31.6	18.6	5.8	32.4	29.5	29.2	32.0	30.0	26.7	22.4	18.0	17.0	16.0	253	198		Oneworld
8	China	Hainan Airlines (Note: Includes figures for Chang An Airlines, China Xinhua Airlines and Shan Xi Airlines.)		54.6	-	21.1	41.3	37.0	81.7	79.9	71.7	46.3	38.6	35.6	26.3	22.6	20.5	18.6	221	110		—N/a
9	United Arab Emirates	Emirates	55.6	51.9	43.6	19.6	6.6	56.2	58.6	58.5	56.1	51.9	49.3	44.5	39.4	34.0	31.4	27.4	252	157		—N/a
10	Japan	Japan Airlines (Note: Includes figures for J-Air, JAL Express and ZIPAIR Tokyo.)		43.7	40.7	30.1	16.2	8.5 (Apr)	44.6	43.6	42.3	40.6	39.9	39.1	38.6	37.6	35.4	44.7	156	92		Oneworld
11	China	Xiamen Air		43.1	36.4	18.1																
12	Singapore	Singapore Airlines (Note: Includes figures for Scoot and SilkAir.)	41.6	39	34.7	20.7	2.2	7.0	38.1	35.5	32.4	33.7	22.5	22.2	18.7	18.1	16.9	16.6	157	137		Star Alliance
13	Japan	All Nippon Airways (Note: Includes figures for Air Japan, ANA Wings and Peach Aviation.)		35.5	42.7	29.2	18.8	13.1	50.7	49.8	49.2	47.3	50.8	50.4	49.0	47.4	44.9	45.7	225	97		Star Alliance
14	Saudi Arabia	Saudia	37	35	30.3	31.9	-	-	36.9	-	32.2	30.0	27.9	14.8	11.5	10.3	8.4	-	157	140		SkyTeam
15	Vietnam	VietJet Air		25.9	25.3	20.6	5.4	12.1	23.7	23.1	17.1	14.1	9.3	-	-	-	-	-	77	115		—N/a
16	Philippines	Cebu Pacific (Note: Includes figures for Cebgo.)		24.5	20.9	14.9	3.4	5.0	22.5	20.3	19.7	19.1	18.4	16.9	14.4	12.3	10.5	9.6	52	62		Value Alliance
17	Indonesia	Garuda Indonesia (Note: Includes figures for Citilink.)		23.7	20.0	14.9	11.0	10.8	31.9	38.4	36.2	34.9	32.9	29.1	24.9	20.4	17.1	12.5	134	90		SkyTeam
18	South Korea	Korean Air (Note: Includes figures for Jin Air.)		23.5	-	-	5.7	7.5	27.0	-	26.8	26.8	24.9	23.3	23.6	24.0	23.3	22.9	159	121		SkyTeam
19	Vietnam	Vietnam Airlines (Note: Includes figures for Vietnam Air Services Company and Pacific Airlines.)		23.1	24.1	20.7	7.1	16.4	29.1	28	27.2	25.3	21	15.7	15.0	14.0	-	-	103	64		SkyTeam
20	Hong Kong	Cathay Pacific (Note: Includes figures for Dragonair and HK Express.)	36.8	22.8	18.0	2.8	0.7	4.6	35.2	35.4	34.8	34.3	34.0	31.5	29.9	29.0	27.6	26.8	159	88		Oneworld
21	United Arab Emirates	Air Arabia (Note: Includes figures for Air Arabia Egypt, Air Arabia Maroc, Air Arabia Abu Dhabi, Fly Arna, and Fly Jinnah.)		18.8	16.7	12.8	5.0	3.0	15.0	13.0	12.0	11.5	10.8	9.0	8.5	8.0	7.6		77	180		—N/a
22	United Arab Emirates	Etihad Airways	22.4	18.5	14.0	10.0	3.1	4.2	17.5	17.8	18.6	18.4	17.6	14.8	11.5	10.2	8.3	7.1	103	81		—N/a
23	Malaysia	Malaysia Airlines (Note: Includes figures for Firefly and MASwings.)		16.6	14.5	9.9	1.7	3.9	-	-	14.0	20.7	15.0	16.0	17.2	13.4	13.3	13.1	77	79		Oneworld
24	Thailand	Thai Airways International (Note: Includes figures for Thai Smile.)		16.1	13.6	9.0	1.6	5.9	24.5	24.3	24.6	22.3	21.2	19.1	21.5	20.6	18.4	18.2	79	65		Star Alliance
25	Philippines	Philippine Airlines (Note: Includes figures for PAL Express.)		15.6	14.7	9.3	2.9	3.9	16.7	15.9	14.5	13.4	12.0	12.0	11.2	12.7	-	-	78	72		—N/a
26	United Arab Emirates	Flydubai		15.4	13.8	10.6	5.6	3.2	9.6	11.0	10.9	10.4	9.0	7.3	6.9	5.1	-	-	88	127		—N/a
27	South Korea	Jeju Air		13.4	-	7.9	6.5	4.3	8.4	12.0	4.6	-	-	-	-	-	-	-	39	41		Value Alliance
28	Taiwan	EVA Airways (Note: Includes figures for Uni Air.)		13.2	11.2	2.2	0.3	2.3	12.8	12.5	12.1	11.2	10.0	8.9	8.0	7.5	6.6	6.4	87	62		Star Alliance
29	Kazakhstan	Air Astana (Note: Includes figures for FlyArystan.)		9.0	8.0	7.4	5.6	3.6	5.1	4.3	4.2	3.8	-	-	3.7	3.3			29	58		—N/a
30	India	SpiceJet		7.6	10.2	12.4	9.0	8.0	24.3	19.2	17.3	14.3	11.7	12.6	11.7	9.5	8.6	6.6	118	53		—N/a
31	India	Akasa Air		7.6	6.2	0.7													22	28		—N/a
32	Uzbekistan	Uzbekistan Airways		6.0	5.0	4.0	3.0	1.0	11.0	10.1	9.9	-	8.6	7.8	6.5	5.2	-	-	39	65		—N/a
33	Oman	Oman Air		5.4	6.2	9.9	1.2	-	-	-	8.5	7.7	6.4	5.1	4.9	3.8	3.3		50	53		Oneworld
34	Thailand	Bangkok Airways		4.3	4.0	2.7	0.5	1.9	5.9	5.9	5.9	5.7	5.6	5.1	4.9				35	30		—N/a
35	Jordan	Royal Jordanian		3.7	3.6	3.0	1.6	0.8	3.3	3.3	3.1	-	-	-	-	-	-	-	31	54		Oneworld
36	Sri Lanka	SriLankan Airlines		3.5	3.64	1.5	0.2	5.3	5.7	5.8	4.4	4.3	4.3	4.2	4.3	3.8	3.3		23	37		Oneworld
37	Bangladesh	Biman Bangladesh Airlines		3.4	-	2.8	1.2	0.9	1.8	1.8	1.7								21	40		—N/a
38	India	Alliance Air		1.4	1.6	1.5	1.0	0.8	1.6	1.6	1.0	0.5	0.3	0.3	0.3	0.4	0.4	-	21	75		—N/a
39	Taiwan	China Airlines (Note: Includes figures for Mandarin Airlines.)			9.5	1.5	0.2	2.4	15.6	15.6	15.1	14.7	14.7	14.1	12.8	11.4	-	11.3	84	102		SkyTeam
	Taiwan	Starlux Airlines			3.5	0.3													21	29		—N/a
-	Pakistan	Pakistan International Airlines			-	-	-	9.8	14.6	10.4	9.8	8.9	9.2	9.5	9.7	11.1	11.5	10.5	47	69		—N/a
-	Indonesia	Lion Air Group (Note: Includes figures for Batik Air, Wings Air, Batik Air Malaysia and Thai Lion Air.)			-	-	9.9 (Lion Air only)	-	-	56.3	51.8	40.8 (Lion & Batik only)	53.0	45.0	37.9	32.0	27.0	20.5	140	90		—N/a
-	South Korea	Asiana Airlines (Note: Includes figures for Air Busan and Air Seoul)			-	-	-	-	-	23.5	17.2	18.4	-	17.3	16.3	15.0	14.7	13.9	83	90		Star Alliance

== By fleet size (Single-aisle, Widebody, Total aircraft) ==
Rank	Airline	Single-aisle	Widebody	Total aircraft (on order/planned) (Note: "on order/planned" - only include new-built aircraft close to delivery and expected second-hand deliveries. They do not include all outstanding orders as reported by aircraft manufacturers)	Sources
1	China Southern Airlines	598	110	717	
2	China Eastern Airlines	576	103	686	
3	Air China	407	124	538	
4	IndiGo	421	7	433	
5	Emirates			284	
6	Qatar Airways			274	
7	All Nippon Airways			250	
8	Hainan Airlines			227	
9	Air India			190	
10	Xiamen Air			178	
11	Korean Air			175 (6)	
12	Saudia			167 (5)	
13	Singapore Airlines			158 (8)	
14	Air Japan			150 (2)	
15	Air Asia			111 (1)	

== See also ==
- World's largest airlines
- List of largest airlines in Europe
- List of largest airlines in Central America & the Caribbean
- List of largest airlines in Africa
- List of largest airlines in North America
- List of largest airlines in South America
- List of largest airlines in Oceania
