= List of companies of the Comoros =

Location of the Comoros

The Comoros, officially the Union of the Comoros, is a sovereign archipelago island nation in the Indian Ocean, located at the northern end of the Mozambique Channel off the eastern coast of Africa, between northeastern Mozambique and northwestern Madagascar. Agriculture, including fishing, hunting, and forestry, is the leading sector of the economy. It contributes 40% to GDP, employs 80% of the labor force, and provides most of the exports. The country is not self-sufficient in food production; rice, the main staple, accounts for the bulk of imports. The Comoros is one of the world's poorest countries. Economic growth and poverty reduction are major priorities for the government.

== Notable firms ==
This list includes notable companies with primary headquarters located in the country. The industry and sector follow the Industry Classification Benchmark taxonomy. Organizations which have ceased operations are included and noted as defunct.

Notable companies Status: P=Private, S=State; A=Active, D=Defunct
| Name | Industry | Sector | Headquarters | Founded | Notes | Status | |
|---|---|---|---|---|---|---|---|
| AB Aviation | Consumer services | Airlines | Moroni | 2013 | Private airline | P | A |
| Central Bank of the Comoros | Financials | Banks | Moroni | 1981 | Central bank | S | A |
| Comores Air Services | Consumer services | Airlines | Moroni | ? | Defunct airline | P | D |
| Comores Aviation International | Consumer services | Airlines | Moroni | 1996 | Airline | P | A |
| Comoro Islands Airline | Consumer services | Airlines | Moroni | 2008 | Airline | P | A |
| Exim Bank Comoros | Financials | Banks | Moroni | 2007 | Commercial bank, part of Exim Bank Group (Tanzania) | P | A |
| Int'Air Îles | Consumer services | Airlines | Anjouan | 2007 | Regional airline | P | D |

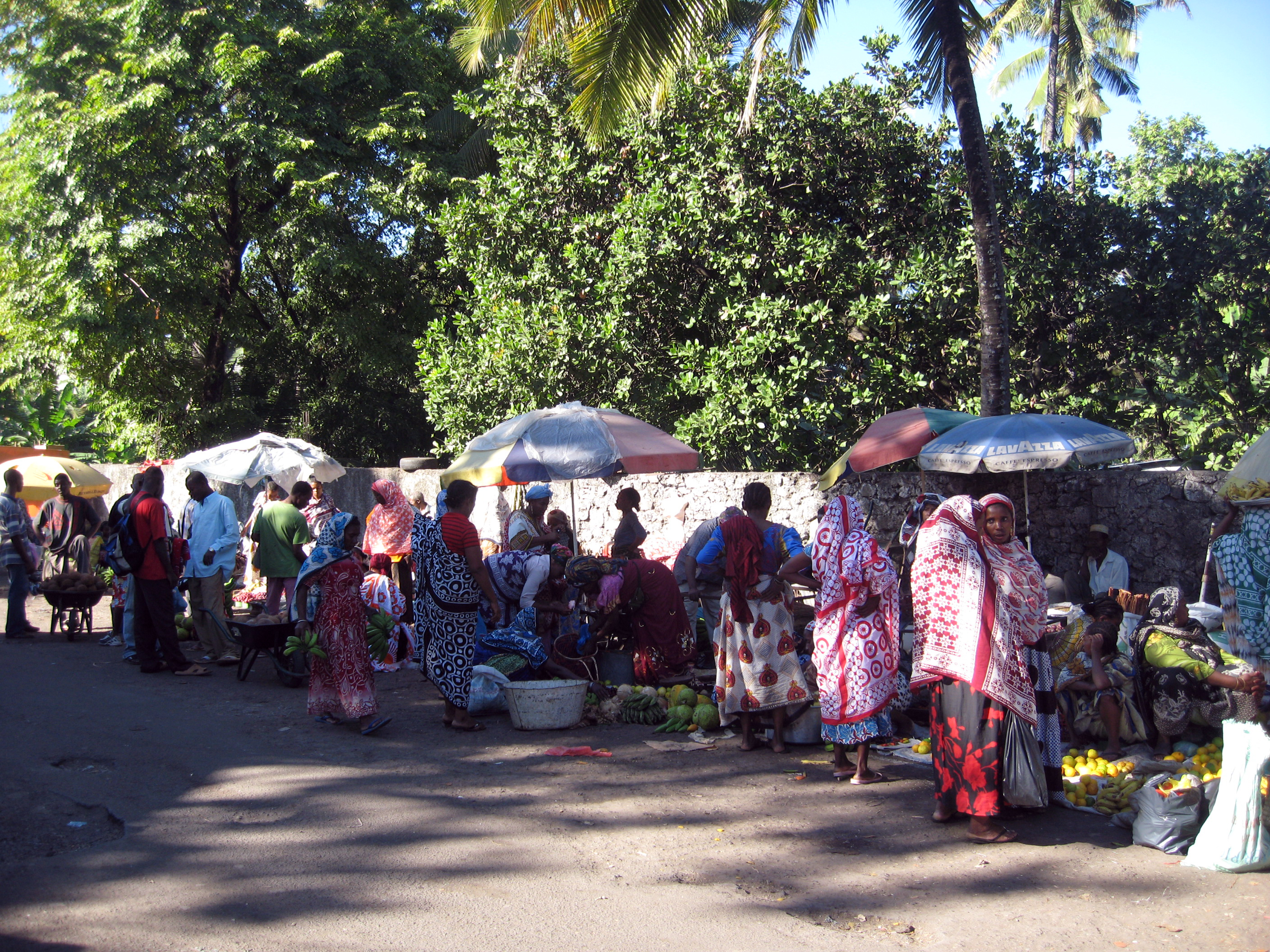
A market place in Moroni.

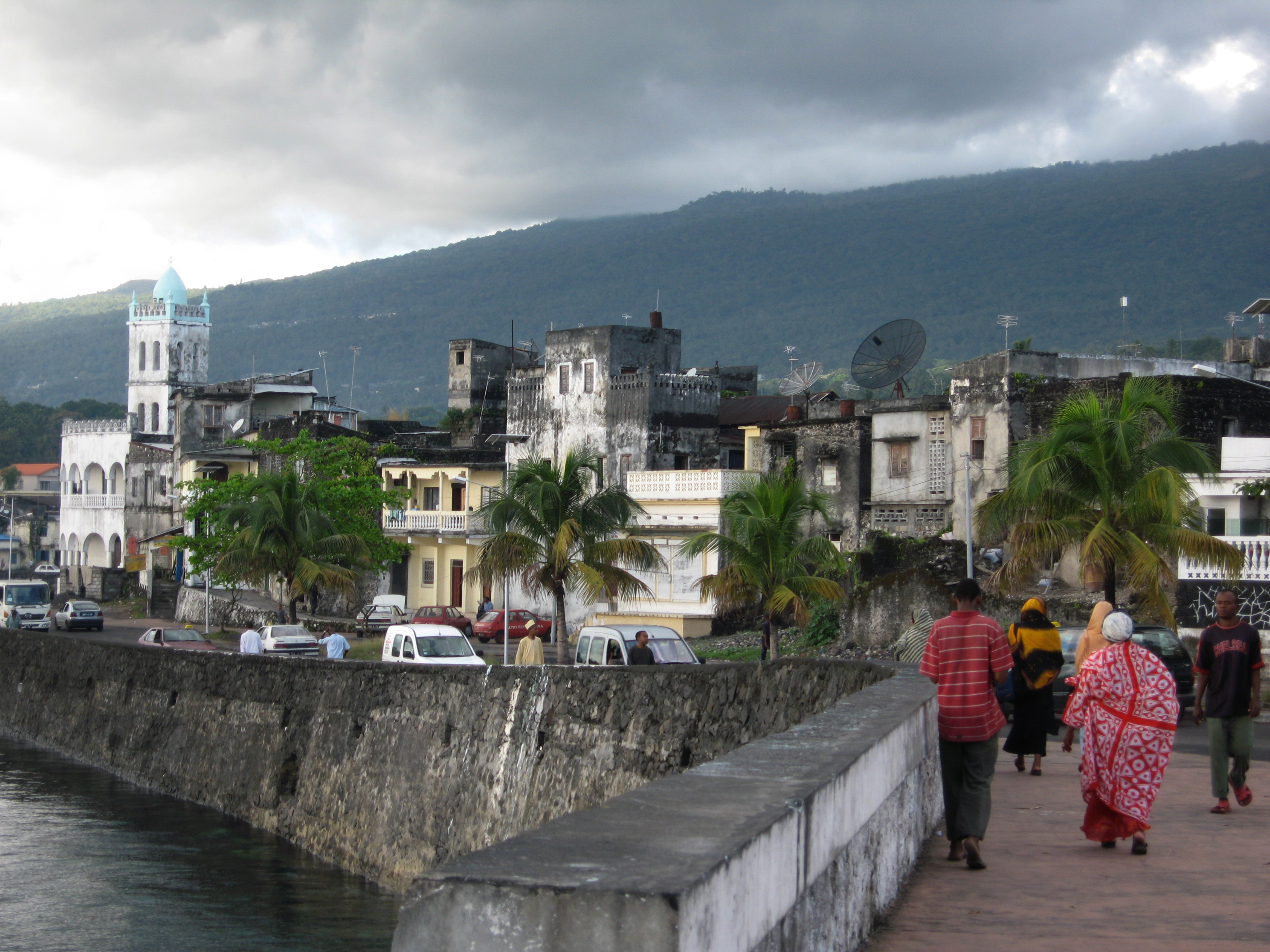
Main harbour in Moroni.

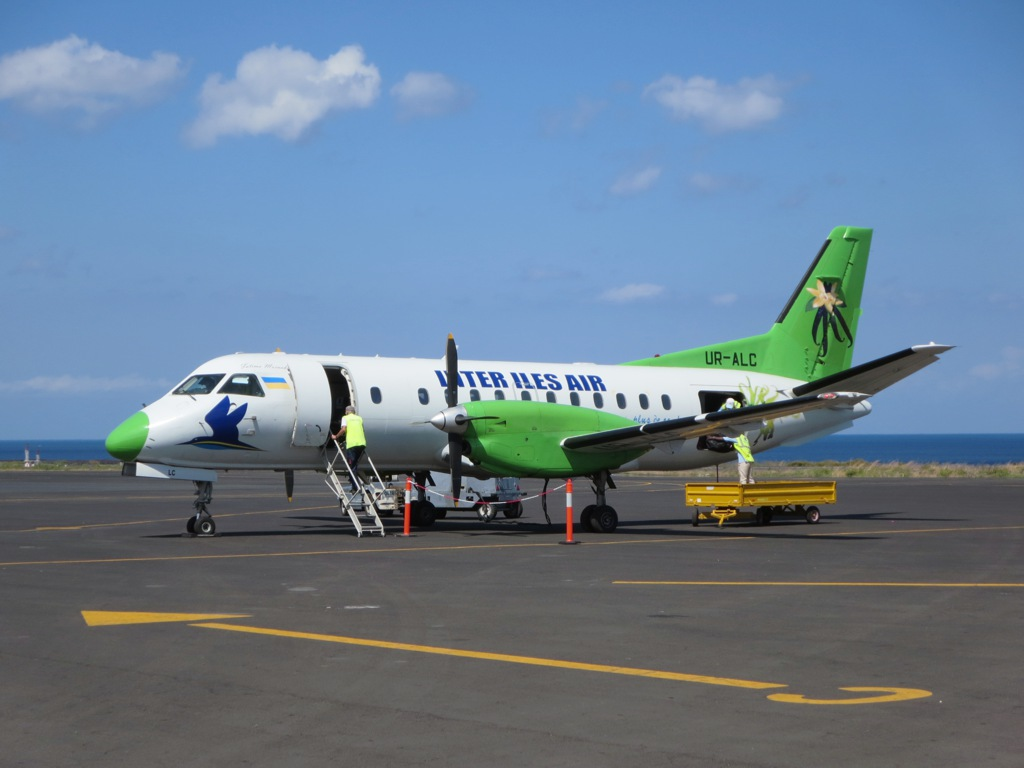
An Int'Air Îles Saab 340 at Moroni Airport.

== See also ==
- Economy of the Comoros
- List of airlines of the Comoros
- List of banks in the Comoros
