= AB Aviation =

Airline of the Comoros

IATA	ICAO	Call sign
Y6	CIK	AYAD
- Founded: 2011
- Ceased operations: March 19, 2022 (suspended)
- Operating bases: Prince Said Ibrahim International Airport
- Fleet size: 4
- Destinations: 5
- Headquarters: Moroni, Comoros
- Website: www.flyabaviation.com

AB Aviation was a private regional airline and the largest in the Comoros headquartered and based at Prince Said Ibrahim International Airport. Following a fatal accident on 26 February 2022, the airline's air operator's certificate was revoked.

== History ==
AB Aviation was founded in 2011 with its main purpose being to fill in the gap left by Air Service Comores and Comores Aviation, with both having ceased operations. In September 2016, the National Civil Aviation and Meteorological Agency of Comoros (ANACM) revoked the airworthiness of AB Aviation's Boeing 737, citing problems regarding the aircraft's hydraulic systems within its shock absorbers. The Boeing 737 was sent to South Africa to judge whether the aircraft was airworthy. In November, one of the airline's Embraer aircraft was grounded for 15 days. On 19 March 2022, the Comorian Civil Aviation revoked the air operator's certificate of AB Aviation, halting all operations. The airline, which was accused of not having insured the passengers, was sentenced by a civil court to pay the victims of the plane crash €600,000 in compensation.

== Services ==
=== Destinations ===
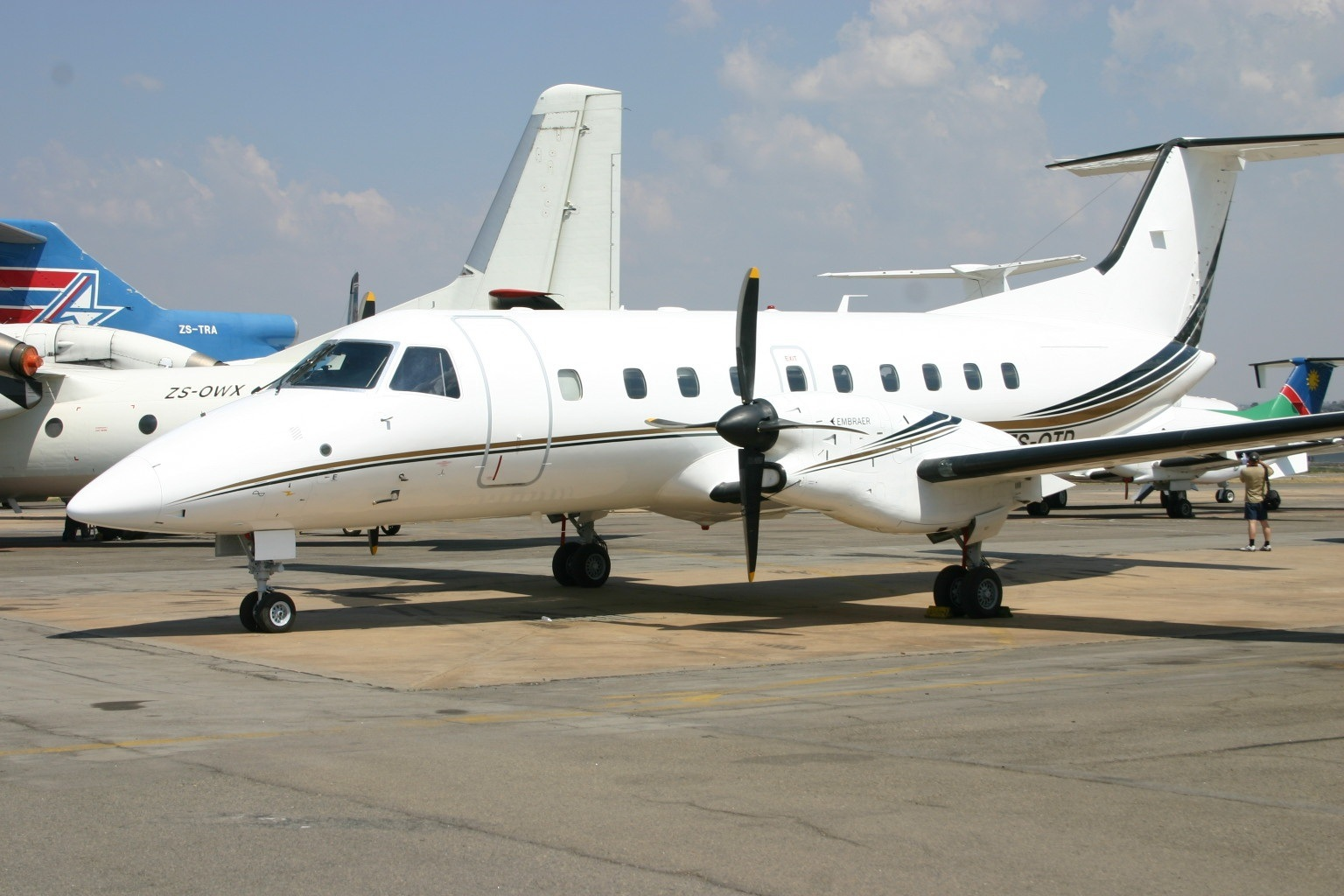
AB Aviation Embraer EMB 120

As of August 2018, AB Aviation served the following destinations:

Comoros

- Anjouan - Ouani Airport
- Moheli - Mohéli Bandar Es Eslam Airport
- Moroni - Prince Said Ibrahim International Airport

France (Mayotte)

- Dzaoudzi - Dzaoudzi–Pamandzi International Airport

Tanzania

- Dar es Salaam - Julius Nyerere International Airport

=== Fleet ===
Historically, the airline's fleet included the following aircraft:

- 1 Beechcraft C90E
- 1 Boeing 737-200
- 1 Cessna Grand Caravan
- 1 Embraer ERJ 145
- 3 Embraer EMB 120 (including 2 Embraer EMB120ER)
- 1 Let L-410 Turbolet

== Accidents and incidents ==
=== AB Aviation Flight 1103 ===
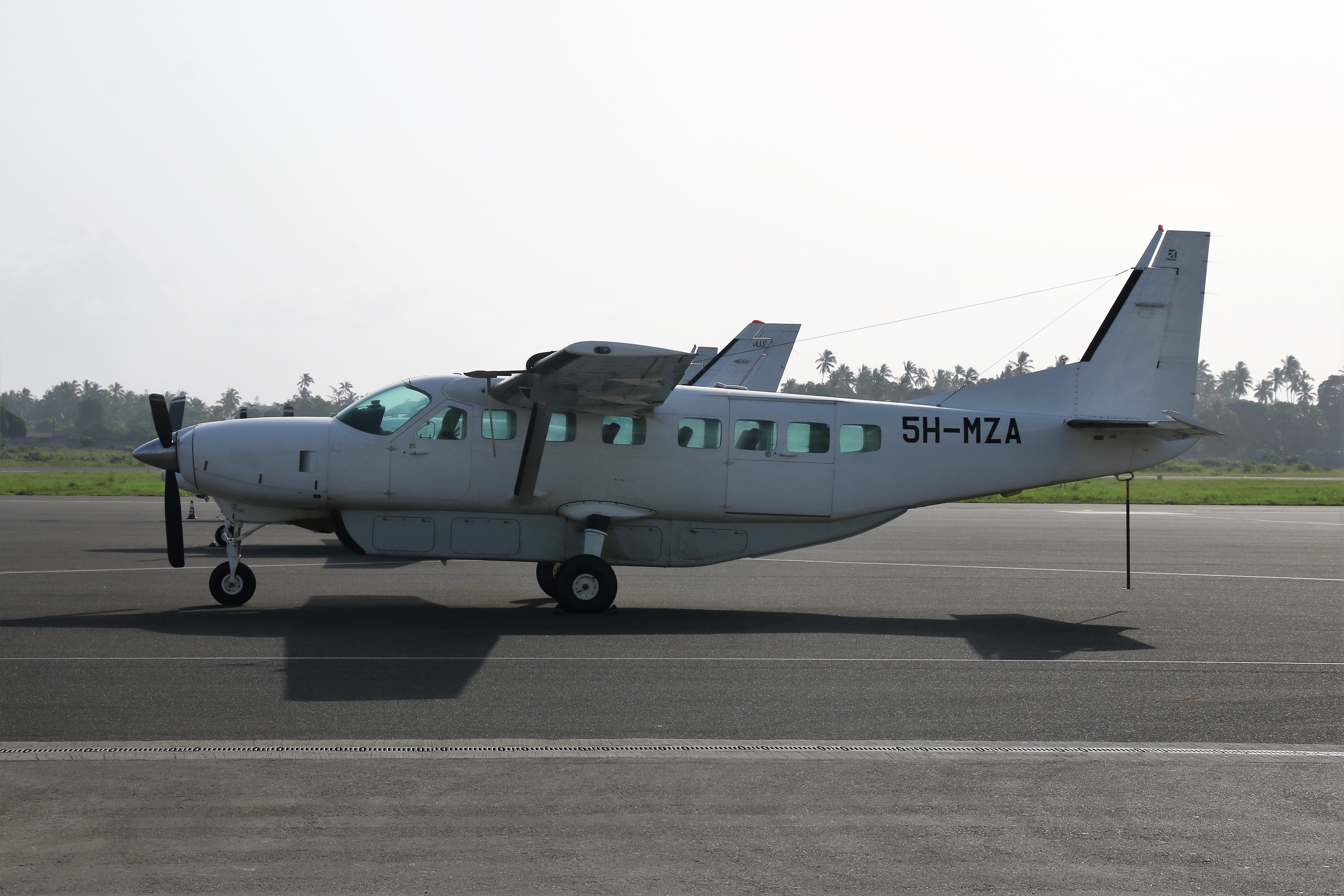
5H-MZA, the aircraft involved, one month before the accident

On February 26, 2022, a Cessna 208D Caravan registered 5H-MZA leased from Fly Zanzibar, operating as AB Aviation Flight 1103 and flying from Prince Said Ibrahim International Airport to Mohéli Airport, crashed about 2.5 km into the Indian Ocean. All 14 occupants on board the aircraft were killed. The flight had taken off from Mohéli Airport at 11:50 EAT.

No distress calls or technical faults were issued by the pilots. Search and rescues were hampered by bad weather conditions, which had been present for several days over the Comoros islands. The Comorian Government declared three days of national mourning. The Tanzania Civil Aviation Authority sent a team of investigators to assist in the investigation. As of 2023, the wreckage remains missing with only one unidentified body having been found.

In October 2024, a report from the commission investigating the crash criticized the pilots' lack of familiarization regarding the scheduled route. The report also noted that the pilots were unaware of the weather conditions along the flight path. A succession of "major" errors led to the aircraft crashing. As a result of the accident, single-engined aircraft were banned from flying in the Comoros.

== See also ==
- List of defunct airlines of the Comoros
