= List of defunct airlines of the Comoros =

This is a list of defunct airlines in Comoros.

Airline	Image	IATA	ICAO	Callsign	Commenced operations	Ceased operations	Notes
AB Aviation		Y6	CIK	COMOROS AIRLINE	2010	2022	
Air Comores					1966	1974	
Air Comores		OR	AOR	AIR COMORES	1975	1997	
Air Comores International		AK	HAH		2004	2006	Formed in 2004 by Air Bourbon (40%), SARL Phoenix (20%) and local investors headed by Tony Medawar
Air Moheli international					2011		
Comores Air Services			KMD		1996	2016	
Comores Airlines			CWK		2001	2002	
Comores Aviation International		O5	KMZ		1997	2011	Renamed from Comores Aviation
Comoro Islands Airline			CIN	VANILLA	2008	2011	
Continental Wings							
Grand Comoros					2006	2007	
Int'Air Îles		I7	IIA	INTER ÎLES	2007	2024	

== See also ==
- List of airlines of Comoros
