= Bahia Bakari =

Sole survivor of Yemenia Flight 626 crash in 2009

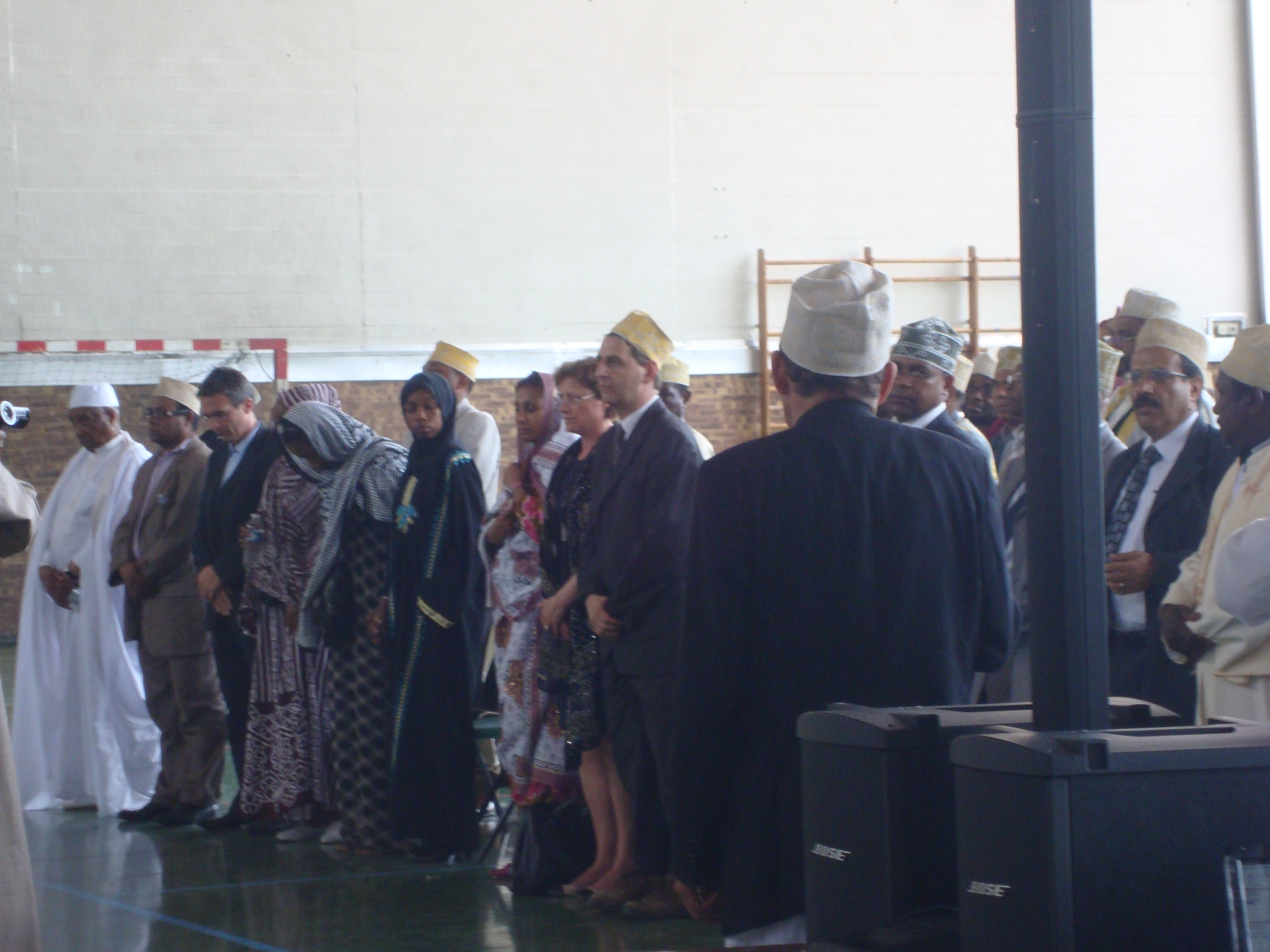
- Bahia Bakari (centre, in black) at a first anniversary ceremony in Paris. Also in the picture are Daniel Goldberg, Annick Lepetit, and Stéphane Troussel.
- Born: 15 August 1996 (age 30); Evry, France

Bahia Bakari (born 15 August 1996) is a French woman who was the sole survivor of Yemenia Flight 626, an Airbus A310, which crashed into the Indian Ocean near the north coast of Grande Comore, Comoros, on 30 June 2009, killing the other 152 people on board. Twelve-year-old (Note: The age of Bakari at the time of the accident was also reported to be 14.) Bakari, who had little swimming experience and no life vest, clung to a piece of aircraft wreckage, floating in heavy seas for over nine hours, much of it in pitch darkness, before being rescued. Her mother, who had been traveling with her from Paris, France, for a summer vacation in Comoros, died in the crash.

Dubbed "the miracle girl" by the world press (French: la miraculée), Bakari was flown back to France on a private Falcon-900 government jet, escorted by French Co-operation Minister Alain Joyandet. Arriving at Le Bourget airport, she was reunited with her father, Kassim Bakari, and the rest of her family, and transported to a Paris hospital for a fractured pelvis and collarbone, burns to her knees and some facial injuries.

Upon her return to Paris, Minister Joyandet hailed Bakari's survival:

In the midst of the mourning, there is Bahia. It is a miracle, it is an absolutely extraordinary battle for survival ... It's an enormous message that she sends to the world ... almost nothing is impossible.

Bakari was released from the hospital three weeks later, after undergoing treatment and surgery. In 2010 she released a memoir book, "Moi Bahia, la miraculée" ("I'm Bahia, the miracle girl"), co-authored with a French journalist as a ghostwriter, detailing her survival and rescue. She has reportedly turned down an offer by Steven Spielberg to make a film based on her book.

== Early life and education ==
Bakari was born on 15 August 1996 in the former French commune of Évry, Essonne, near Paris, France. She is the oldest of four children born to Kasim Bakari (born 1961) and his wife Aziza Aboudou, both of whom were from the Comorian village of Ngnoumadzaha Mvoubari. Kasim worked as a janitor while Aziza was a homemaker. Bakari has two younger brothers named Badrou and Badawy, and a younger sister named Badian. She was raised in her family's Muslim faith.

After the crash, Bakari studied at the Collège Louise-Michel in Paris.

== Flight history and crash ==
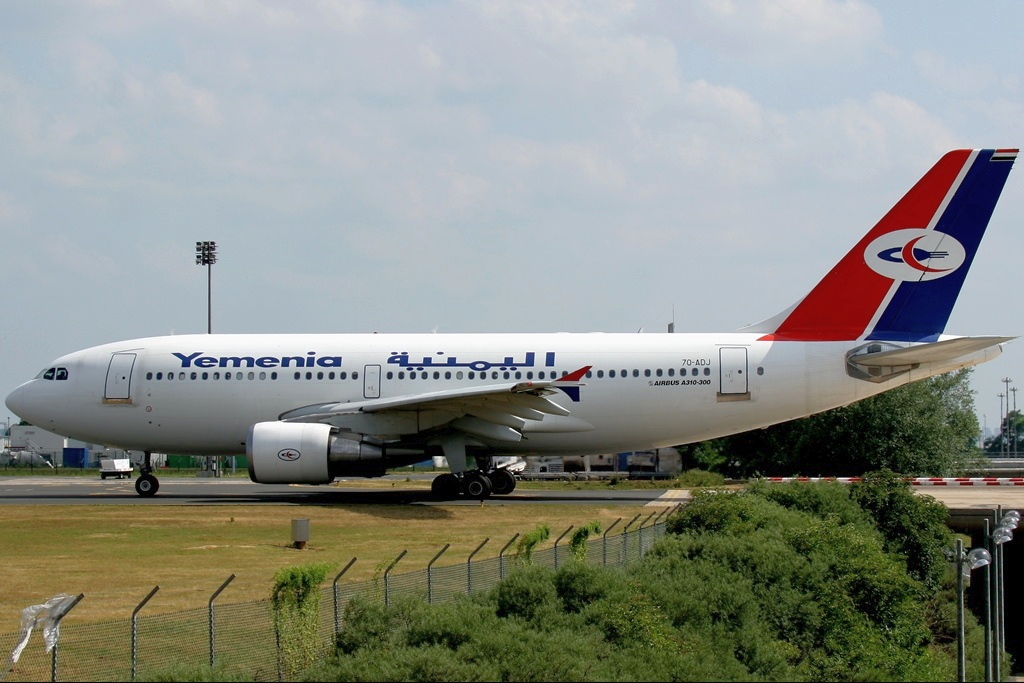
The Airbus A310 involved in the accident in 2005

Bakari and her mother, Aziza Aboudou, were traveling to the Comoros for a summer vacation. Like many of the passengers of Yemenia Flight 626, they began their voyage from Paris, France on Yemenia Flight 749, an Airbus A330-200, which made an intermediate stop in Marseille and then landed in Sana'a, Yemen. There the passengers boarded Flight 626, an Airbus A310-324, for the flight segment to Comoros. As it descended for its approach, minutes away from its final destination of Prince Said Ibrahim International Airport, the jet plunged into the ocean 9 miles (14 km) north of the coastline of Grande Comore island, breaking apart as it hit the water, at approx. 01:50 local time (22:50 UTC). Bakari was ejected from the plane as it crashed, and found herself floating alone outside amid debris. Investigators would later determine that the cause of the accident was pilot error due to the approach being unstabilized and the flight crew's inappropriate responses to the ground proximity and stall warning systems.

== Survival ==
Bakari reported having no life jacket and only minimal swimming skills, but she managed to hold on to a piece of fuselage wreckage. One night elapsed before her rescue. She reported later that initially there must have been other survivors, as she could hear them after the crash but later the voices became silent. The next morning, Bakari came to realize she was alone at sea, having been drifting for hours without food and water. She also reported having seen a ship on the horizon that was too far away to notice her.

== Rescue ==
Since the Comorian government has no ships of its own, it asked all commercial and private vessels to help in the search and rescue effort. At approximately 11:00 local time (08:00 UTC), about nine hours after the crash, the Sima Com 2 — a privately owned ship which normally carries passengers between Comoros and the neighboring island of Madagascar — arrived at the crash site and discovered Bakari, as the sole survivor among bits of floating wreckage.

As soon as Bakari was sighted, a member of the rescue team threw her a life preserver, but the waters were too rough, and she was too exhausted to grab it. One of the sailors, Maturaffi Sélémane Libounah, jumped into the water and handed her a flotation device, after which they were both pulled safely aboard the Sima Com 2, where she was given dry blankets and a hot drink.

Ibrahim Abdallah, another sailor on the Sima Com 2, recalled Bakari's recovery:

When the girl saw us approaching, she let go of the piece of debris she had been using as a life preserver. Suddenly, a large wave flipped her over and she disappeared from view, until she reappeared a few minutes later. It was at this exact moment that Maturaffi jumped into the water to save her.

The ship arrived in Port Moroni at 19:25 local time (16:25 UTC), where Bakari was handed over to medical authorities and taken to a local hospital.

== Aftermath ==
The next day, Bakari was transported back to Paris on a private French government Falcon-900 jet, escorted by Cooperation Minister Alain Joyandet, who called her survival "a true miracle." Upon arrival, she was reunited with her father and other family members, and taken by ambulance to the Armand-Trousseau children's hospital in eastern Paris, where she was admitted and diagnosed with a fractured pelvis and collarbone, burns to her knees, cuts, bruises and exhaustion. One of her first visitors in the hospital was then French President Nicolas Sarkozy, who reportedly promised to host her and her family at the Élysée Palace. Soon afterwards, she was informed of her mother's death. She was released three weeks later after undergoing treatment and surgery.

In a commemoration ceremony held in the Comoros for the accident victims on 6 July, Comorian President Ahmed Abdallah Mohamed Sambi declared a month of national mourning in his island nation and honored Maturaffi Sélémane Libounah, the sailor who had rescued Bahia Bakari, telling him: "You saved someone else's life at the risk of losing yours."

According to Aviation Safety Network's database, Bakari is a survivor of the deadliest sole survivor ocean crash, and the third-deadliest sole survivor crash ever. The other sole survivor crashes that were deadlier involved Northwest Airlines Flight 255 in 1987, in which 156 were killed, including 2 on the ground, and Air India Flight 171 in 2025, in which 260 were killed, including 19 on the ground.

== Book ==
In January 2010, Bakari released an account of her ordeal in a French memoir, "Moi Bahia, la miraculée" ("I'm Bahia, the miracle girl"), published by Jean-Claude Gawsewitch, Paris, France. In the book, co-authored with French journalist Omar Guendouz as ghostwriter, Bakari provides details about her survival and rescue. She discloses that immediately after the crash, she thought she had fallen out of the airplane by pressing her forehead too hard against the window, and that her mother—who she believed had landed safely without her—would scold her for not wearing her seat belt. Then, floating on debris in the midst of a jet fuel slick released from the aircraft's burst fuel tanks, she recalls having "...this taste of fuel in my mouth, mixed with salt, which burned my throat, my lungs and my stomach." Bakari writes that she only realized her plane had crashed and that she was the sole survivor when she was in the hospital, believing until then that she had simply fallen out into the ocean. AOL News reports that Steven Spielberg approached Bakari to make a film based on her book, but she turned him down, worried that "it would be too terrifying."

== See also ==
- List of aviation accidents and incidents with a sole survivor
