= Yemenia Flight 626 =

2009 aviation accident near Comoros

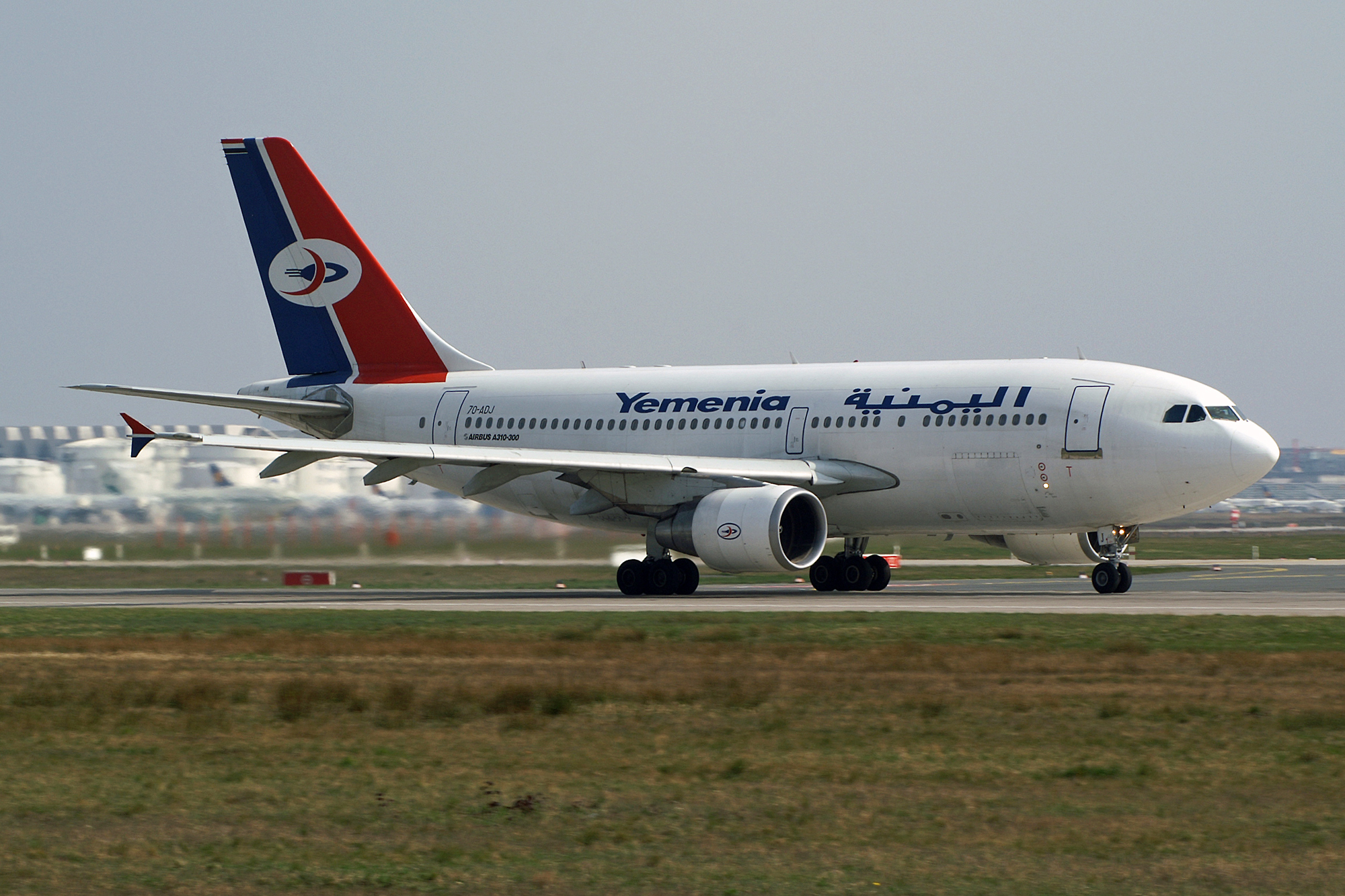
- 7O-ADJ, the aircraft involved in the accident, pictured in 2007

Accident
- Date: 30 June 2009
- Summary: Stalled on approach due to pilot error; impacted ocean
- Site: Indian Ocean, near Comoros; 11°22′17.54″S 43°13′30.07″E

Aircraft
- Aircraft type: Airbus A310-324
- Operator: Yemenia
- IATA flight No.: IY626
- ICAO flight No.: IYE626
- Call sign: YEMENIA 626
- Registration: 7O-ADJ
- Flight origin: Sanaa International Airport, Sanaa, Yemen
- Destination: Prince Said Ibrahim International Airport, Moroni, Comoros
- Occupants: 153
- Passengers: 142
- Crew: 11
- Fatalities: 152
- Injuries: 1
- Survivors: 1

Yemenia Flight 626 was a scheduled flight on an Airbus A310 twin-engine jet airliner operated by Yemenia that was flying a scheduled international service, from Sanaa in Yemen to Moroni in Comoros, when it crashed on 30 June 2009 at around 1:50 am local time (10:50 pm on 29 June UTC) while on approach to Prince Said Ibrahim International Airport, killing all but one of the 153 passengers and crew on board. The sole survivor, 12-year-old girl Bahia Bakari, was found clinging to wreckage after floating in the ocean. Bakari was discharged from the hospital on 23 July 2009.

With 152 deaths, it was the deadliest aviation disaster in the Comoros and one of the deadliest modern disasters in the nation.

The final report on the incident concluded that the crew's inappropriate flight control inputs led to an aerodynamic stall. Failing to stabilize the approach, the crew decided to abandon it and made a go-around. While conducting the climb, they were unaware that their inputs caused the automation system to set the thrust to idle, decreasing the airspeed and causing the aircraft to stall. Saturated by their workload and lack of training, the crew failed to properly get out of the stall as they kept making a nose up input. The aircraft eventually impacted the Indian Ocean. The report also noted that the crew did not react to the warnings being issued by the aircraft.

== Aircraft ==
The aircraft was an Airbus A310-324 twin-engine jetliner, registration 7O-ADJ, manufactured in 1990 as serial number 535. It was in service for 19 years and 3 months, and had accumulated 53,587 flight hours on 18,129 flight cycles at the time of the accident. Yemenia bought the aircraft in October 1999.

Dominique Bussereau, the French Secretary of State for Transport, reported that the plane was inspected in 2007 by the French Directorate General for Civil Aviation and found to have a number of faults; since then, however, the aircraft had not returned to France, so it was never again inspected by the same authority.

== Passengers and crew ==
Nationality	Passengers	Crew
France	66	0
Comoros	75	0
Canada	1	0
Ethiopia	0	1
Indonesia	0	1
Morocco	0	2
Palestine	1	0
Philippines	0	1
Yemen	0	6
Total	142	11

There were 142 passengers and 11 crew aboard. Most passengers are believed to have been either Comorian or French nationals. There were also citizens of Canada, Ethiopia, Indonesia, Morocco, Palestine, the Philippines and Yemen on board the plane. An airport source has claimed that 66 of the passengers held French citizenship, but many of those could be dual French-Comorian citizens. Many may have been residents of Marseille, a French city with a large Comorian population, headed home for a vacation; the week of the accident marks the beginning of summer vacations for French school children. The two other persons on board were said to be Europeans. The Yemeni government confirmed that of the 142 passengers aboard, there were a total of 75 Comorians, 66 French, 1 Canadian and 1 Palestinian. There were at least 3 infants on board.

The three flight crew members were all Yemeni. Of the cabin crew, 3 were Yemeni, 2 were Moroccan, 1 was Filipino, 1 was Ethiopian, and 1 was Indonesian.

The flight crew consisted of Captain Khaled Hajeb (Note: Arabic: خالد حاجب) (44), First Officer Ali Atef (Note: Arabic: علي عاطف) (50), and Flight Engineer Ali Salem, (Note: Arabic: علي سالم) all of whom were Yemeni. Captain Hajeb had been working for Yemenia since 1989 and became an A310 captain in 2005. He had 7,936 flight hours, including 5,314 hours on the Airbus A310. Hajeb had previously flown to Moroni 25 times. First Officer Atef had been with the airline since 1980, and he was qualified to fly the Airbus A310 in 2004. Atef had 3,641 flight hours, with 3,076 on the Airbus A310 and had previously flown to Moroni 13 times.

== Accident ==
=== Flight history ===
Flight 626 was a scheduled international passenger flight from the Yemeni capital of Sana'a to Moroni, the capital of the Comoros. At the time, it was one of the primary flights to the Comoros archipelago. The flight was frequented by Comorian diaspora to come home to their homeland, particularly due to its significantly cheaper prices than the other airliners. Passengers from the flight usually came from multiple countries, with the majority coming from France after working overseas.

On 29 June, Flight 626 began its boarding process. Many of the passengers had been in transit from a previous Yemenia flight from Paris to Sana'a with a stopover in Marseille, which was using an Airbus A330-200. Of the 111 passengers, a total of 52 had boarded in Paris and another 59 boarded in Marseille. Comorians diaspora in the Middle East had gathered in the Yemeni capital and eventually boarded the plane, bringing the total number of occupants to 153 people. Majority of the passengers were families who were travelling back to the Comoros for vacation, as it was summer holiday in France. It also coincided with the "wedding season" in the Comoros, known locally as Ada N'amdra. Accordingly, many on the flight were attendees of the weddings.

On the flight was Captain Hajeb, who would be the commander of the flight and pilot flying, and First Officer Atef, who would be the pilot non-flying. The flight took off at 21:54 local time, approximately 24 minutes late due to issues with the APU, and was due to arrive at Prince Said Ibrahim International Airport in Moroni, Comoros, at 2:30 am local time on 30 June. The take-off and enroute phase were uneventful, and the flight proceeded normally.

=== Approach ===
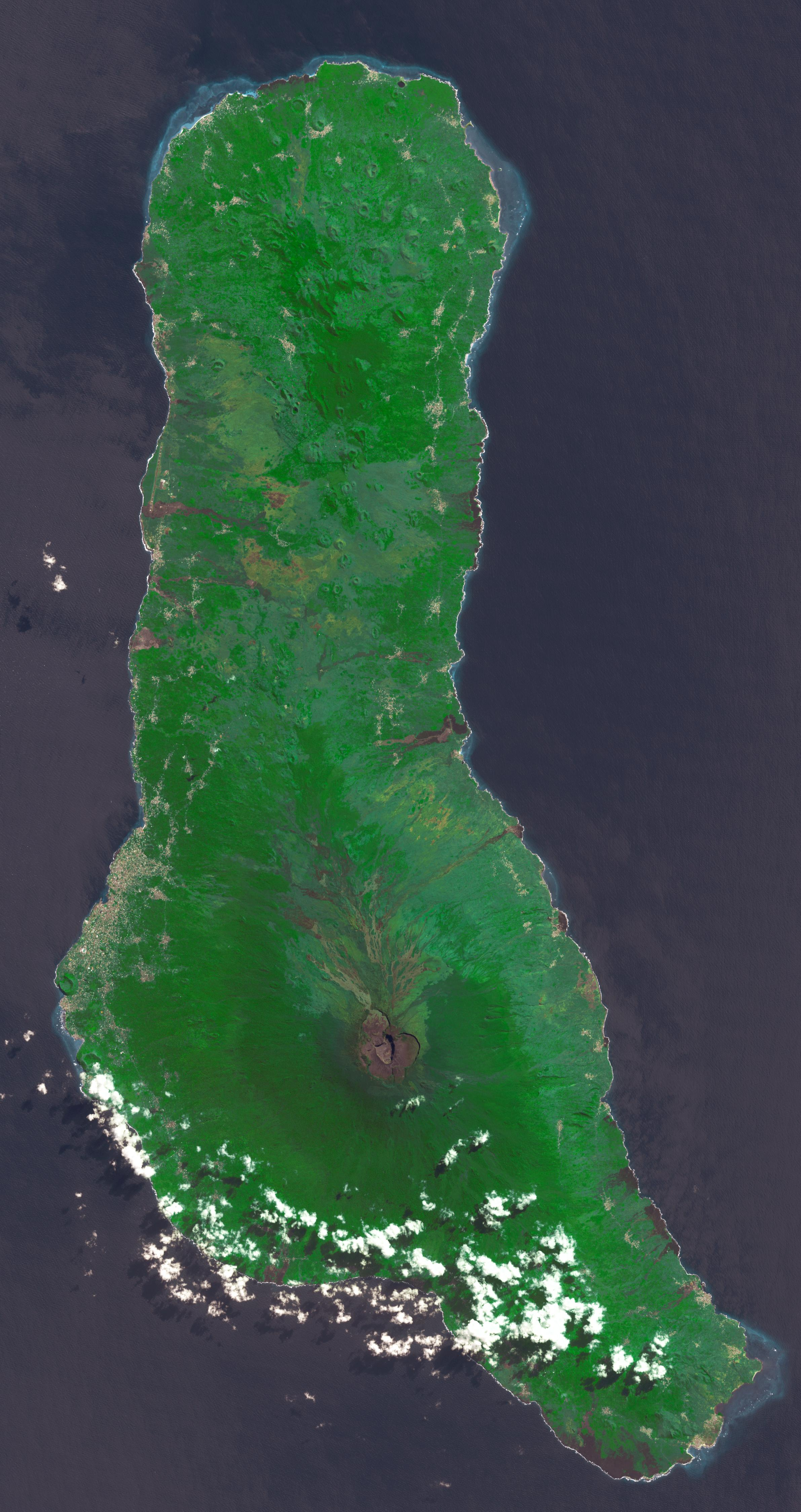
The island of Grande Comore, with Moroni Airport visible. On the day of the accident, Flight 626 approached the airport from the northwest

At 01:00 local time, Flight 626 entered Comoros airspace, coming in from the northwest of the airport, and contacted Moroni Tower to request its approach clearance. The controller advised the crew of the prevailing weather conditions: winds from 190° at 15 knots and visibility of 10 km. Cruising at Flight Level 350 (35,000 ft), the aircraft was expected to land at approximately 1:52 a.m., conducting a straight-in ILS approach to Runway 02. The crew were later cleared to descend to Flight Level 100 (10,000 ft) and began their descent to Moroni.

Approximately 25 nautical miles from the VOR for Runway 02, the controller gave the updated weather report in Moroni. The wind speed had increased, blowing from southwest at 25-30 knots, over the limit of 15 knots. As a result, the crew decided to change their approach from Runway 02 to Runway 20, which was the same runway from the opposite end, from the north. The crew had to make a circling maneuvre first before they eventually managed to line up and land at Moroni. The crew then asked the controller whether the runway threshold lights were illuminated. The ATC responded by saying that they were not.

01:39:51	Captain Hajeb	Confirm the light, the flashing light is on for runway two zero?
01:39:58	Moroni Approach	Flash light runway two zero, I'm afraid not
01:40:03	Captain Hajeb	No, no, I mean I'm looking for the flashing light in runway two zero, beacon.
01:40:10	Moroni Approach	Yes, I understand... but I'm afraid it does not operative
01:40:18	Captain Hajeb	Can you give me maximum runway light?
01:40:24	Moroni Approach	Ok, I'll do it
01:40:25	Captain Hajeb	Thank you

Flight 626 then turned toward the southwest, heading 199, and the autopilot was engaged. The target altitude was selected at 3,000 ft, and the aircraft started to descend, levelling off until it reached said altitude. The weather had deteriorated with winds blowing at around 40 knots. The aircraft was expected to continue flying until 16 nautical miles south of the airport, where it would start to turn to the north, flying parallel with the coastline of Grande Comore while trying to gain visual contact with the runway.

The aircraft turned to the left towards heading 59, continued flying at level wings for several seconds before finally turning again towards heading 15. Flight 626 was now flying to the north, approaching the runway from the south. The speed was set at 190 knots. A few minutes later, Flight 626 intercepted the localizer at 3,000 ft. The crew reported to the tower, and the controller ordered the crew to continue for a right downwind landing. The crew then queried the ATC regarding the wind condition. The controller stated that the wind at Runway 02 was still blowing at 20 - 30 knots, while the winds on Runway 20 were slower, at around 12 - 25 knots. The crew decided to proceed.

01:46:41	First Officer Atef	Established on localizer, Yemenia six two six.
01:46:46	Moroni Approach	...report right downwind for runway two zero
01:46:52	First Officer Atef	Can you increase your voice please? How is the wind now?
01:47:06	Moroni Approach	wind 200°, two zero knots to three zero knots, [but on runway 20] less strong... between one two knots to two five knots.
01:48:02	First Officer Atef	Thank you sir.

The crew selected a target speed of 170 knots into the autothrottle and the engine thrust were decreased. As it flew through 1,300 ft, the slats and the landing gear were extended. The airspeed was still 160 knots. Upon reaching the HA locator, the designated point at which the circling maneuver was to begin, the crew initiated the turn to the left.

=== Crash ===
The aircraft continued flying towards the northwest with a decreasing altitude. During the descend, the autopilot was disengaged. The aircraft was flying too low and descending with an alarming rate, prompting the aircraft's warning system to blare on the flight's dangerous altitude. The pilots then pulled the nose up, causing the aircraft to momentarily level off.

01:50:42	Commentary	Sound of autopilot disengage alarm
01:50:49	First Officer Atef	Right down wind Yemenia six two six
01:50:53	Moroni Approach	Six two six report final
01:50:53	Commentary	Sink rate! Sink rate!
01:50:55	Commentary	Pull up! Pull up!

The aircraft continued its right turn but soon resumed descending at a vertical speed of approximately 1,000 ft/min. At one point, it descended to an altitude of about 160 ft above the surface of the Indian Ocean. The Ground Proximity Warning System (GPWS) again issued repeated "Too low, terrain" warnings. During this time, the crew informed Moroni air traffic control that they would call back later and proceeded to extend the landing gear.

01:51:24	Commentary	Too low terrain! Too low terrain! Too low terrain!
01:51:46	First Officer Atef	We'll call you long final, Yemenia six two six
01:51:49	Moroni Approach	Six two six roger
01:51:51	Commentary	Sounds of landing gear extension

Engine thrust was then increased, and the aircraft's nose began to rise. Shortly afterward, a repetitive chime sounded briefly before stopping, and the aircraft's airspeed continued to decrease. As the speed decayed further, the aircraft began to experience aerodynamic buffeting. The pilots, realizing how low they were flying above the sea, immediately pulled up the yoke. The pitch went up as high as 28 degrees, and the aircraft banked heavily to the right while their altitude fluctuated.

01:52:51	Commentary	Sounds of autopilot disengagement alarm (continued for 46 seconds)
01:52:55	Captain Hajeb	The left one, the left one, the left one, raise everything that's out, raise everything up, the left one, go up, go up!
01:52:57	Commentary	Sounds of yoke vibration (continued until the end of recording)
01:53:02	First Officer Atef	Come on!
01:53:02	First Officer Atef	Pull up!
01:53:03	Unidentified	I'm pushing!
01:53:04	First Officer Atef	No-

The aircraft began to bank to the left and right in quick succession. The low airspeed caused the aircraft to shake more, which caused the pilots to panic. As the aircraft lost its lift, it began to lose altitude as it had entered a stall. The aircraft began to shake violently to the left and right due to lack of lifting forces on the wings. The pilots tried to control the aircraft by pressing the rudder pedals.

After a series of heavy banks and rapidly decreasing airspeed, the aircraft finally had lost all lift forces on the left wing. The left wing stalled completely, causing the stall alarm to blare. Moments later, the aircraft rolled sharply to the left, reaching a bank angle of approximately 74 degrees. The pilots pulled the yoke hard to the right as they tried to save the aircraft by leveling the wings.

01:53:14	Captain Hajeb	The left one! The left one!
01:53:39	Commentary	Sounds of stall warning (continued until the end of the recording)
01:53:41	Captain Hajeb	Pull!
01:53:43	First Officer Atef	It's hopeless!
01:53:52	Unidenfitied	GOD-
01:53:54	Commentary	End of recording

The pilots managed to level the wings, but the aircraft kept stalling. Moments later, it impacted the Indian Ocean in the north coast of Grande Comore, approximately 6 km off the coast of Mitsamiouli. Moroni Tower immediately lost all contact with Flight 626. They tried to call the crew four times, but they received no response. The emergency team was quickly informed about the disappearance of the flight. The controller later relayed the information to other controllers in Antananarivo, Dar es Salaam, Sana'a and Réunion about Flight 626. An unnamed United Nations official at the airport said that the control tower had received a notification that the plane was approaching to land before losing contact. An unseasonably strong cold front had moved through the Comoros Islands, bringing winds gusting to 64 km/h (40 mph; 35 kn) and conditions favorable for light to moderate turbulence. Yemeni civil aviation deputy chief Mohammed Abdul Qader said the wind speed was 61 km/h (38 mph; 33 kn) at the time the aircraft was landing.

== Search and recovery ==
According to the Comoran police, the nation possesses no sea rescue capabilities. The nation's president, Ahmed Abdallah Sambi, ordered every Comorian vessels, including civilian-owned ones, to search for debris and survivors from the crashed aircraft. He also appealed to the international community for aids in searching for the aircraft and survivors. The French government was the first to be asked. Two French military aircraft and a vessel began the formal search for Flight 626. They were sent from Réunion and Mayotte. A medical team, soldiers, gendarmeries, and judicial police would be sent to the Comoros. French frigate Nivôse, which was traveling near Madagascar at the time, also joined the search. The island of Réunion sent a team of divers from the French Army and the island's firefighting services to assist with the search. The Galawa Beach in Mitsamouli became the center for the search and rescue operation.

Later on, the United States and Yemen joined the operation. Yemen sent a team of divers to Grande Comore, while the United States deployed personnel from the United States Air Force alongside a Lockheed C-130 to the search area. As search intensified, more personnel were transported to the Comoros. An Italian vessel, which had been partaking in Operation Atalanta, was also deployed for the operation. France sent a Transall C-160 aircraft from Réunion to detect beacons from the black boxes and French Red Cross personnel were deployed across the island of Grande Comore to assist with the recovery operation.

=== Survivor found ===
Approximately twelve hours after the crash, a civilian vessel Sima Com 2 discovered a survivor clinging onto a piece of debris near Mitsamiouli. The survivor, identified as 12-year-old girl Bahia Bakari, was rescued while floating in rough sea among debris. The boat later transported her to Galawa, where she would later be transported to the nation's largest hospital, El Maarouf Hospital, in Moroni. Bakari had been traveling with her mother, who did not survive.

Bakari was reported to be in stable condition with no life-threatening injuries. She reportedly suffered from hypothermia, bruises and a broken collarbone. She also had mild burn injuries due to leaking fuel from the aircraft. After being treated at Moroni, Bakari was flown back to Paris using a special Falcon 900 flight along with French government officials. She reunited with her father later in Armand-Trousseau children's hospital, where she was expected to fully recover. Bakari was released from hospital on July 23.

=== Continued searches ===
For the next few days, rescuers struggled to find new pieces of debris and bodies. Several pieces of debris were discovered around the area where Bakari had been found, though many were declared to be not from the aircraft. Some of the corpses found during the search operation turned out to be animal carcasses. Debris were eventually found, but they were spread out and were not concentrated. Authorities stated that a lot of them might have drifted from the original location due to ocean currents. The team had to rely on reports of oil slicks and the smell of kerosene. Since the area was also infested with sharks, authorities tried to look in areas with a higher concentration of sharks than usual.

During a reconnaissance mission, a French Transall C-160 aircraft detected a distress signal transmitted by the aircraft's emergency locator beacon approximately 40 km off the coast of Grande Comore. France's Bureau of Enquiry and Analysis for Civil Aviation Safety (BEA) later confirmed that acoustic signals ("pings") from the aircraft's flight recorders had been detected in the same area. As the Comoros had never conducted a survey of the underwater terrain in the region, the French Navy deployed Beautemps-Beaupré, an oceanographic survey vessel docked off Brest, to map the seabed and support the search effort. French officials later stated that the search for the flight recorders was concentrated within an area approximately 300 meters in diameter.

On 7 July, officials in Pwani Region announced that four bodies suspected from the aircraft were found in various locations near Mafia Island, approximately 600 km from the crash site, prompting initial investigation on whether they were the victims of the flight. On the next few days, more bodies were found, amounting to at least 22 victims. Several debris confirmed from the aircraft were also found near the bodies, including one of the Airbus A310's door. The bodies were sent to Dar es Salaam for identification. The Comoros stated that they would also sent personnel to Tanzania to investigate the bodies.

Research on the nature of injuries inflicted on the bodies suggested that many of the decomposing bodies had markings bearing signs of bites from cookiecutter sharks in the area.

The French oceanographic vessel Beautemps-Beaupré arrived at the Comoros on 15 July 2009, and by 23 July 2009 had completed a mapping of the ocean floor around the crash area, which helped pinpoint the exact location of the recorders. Due to the great depth of the recorders' current location, the French navy had announced that it would employ underwater robots for the recovery operation, which began in August 2009. The French vessel EDT Ares was called in to assist with the operation. The search area was narrowed down to 75 meters. The flight data recorder (FDR) was eventually recovered on 28 August from the Indian Ocean at a depth of 1,200 metres (3,900 ft), while the cockpit voice recorder (CVR) was recovered on 29 August. During the underwater search, from August to September, a total of 60 bodies were recovered from the wreckage field at a depth of around 1,200 meters. Debris from the wreckage was unloaded to Moroni in September, and a total of 90 bodies had been recovered. The search for bodies ended in the same month.

== Response ==
=== Government response ===
French foreign minister Bernard Kouchner announced that the Élysée Palace would like to offer their condolences to the families of the victims and stated that French army would do everything they can to assist with the search and rescue efforts. He added that the junior minister for cooperation, Alain Joyandet, would head to Moroni to coordinate with Comorian officials with the operation. Crisis centres were immediately set up in Paris' Charles de Gaulle Airport and in Marseille. The Bobigny Public Prosecutor's Office set up a hotline for families to contact for psychological and legal assistance. Before the start of the first session, the French national assembly held a minute of silence for the victims.

In Yemen, the government cabinet ordered the officials from the higher committee to follow-up with the search and rescue operations and updated their progress, later announced that they would like to express their condolences to the families of the victims. A commission to investigate the crash was established, which would be headed by the Yemeni Minister of Transport Khaled Ibrahim al-Wazir. The Yemeni government also set up a crisis centre in Sana'a for information regarding the crash and as a coordination centre for the search and rescue operations. Arrangements were made for officials, including those from Yemenia, to travel to the crash site for further coordination with the rescue efforts.

The Comoros Red Crescent mobilized approximately 100 of its personnel across Grande Comore to attend the next of kin, supported by the Canadian Red Crescent, French Red Crescent and Spanish Red Crescent. It stated that psychological support and burial would be provided and managed for the families. More than 900 members of the relatives were treated, most of whom suffered from fatigue and anxiety, many could not take care for themselves. Of those, 6 had to be taken to the hospital due to extreme fatigue.

An interreligious memorial service was held at the Grand Mosque of Paris on July 2, attended by hundreds of members of the Comoran community and French President Nicolas Sarkozy. He stated that relatives of the victims who wished to travel to the Comoros to pay homage should contact authorities, as special flights would be organized. French PM François Fillon named French Ambassador to Sudan Christine Robichon as the liaison responsible for communication between relief agencies and the families of the victims.

In Marseille, which hosts the largest Comorian diaspora in Metropolitan France, tributes to the victims were held. An interfaith ceremony was conducted on July 3, attended mainly by members from the Comorian diaspora, dressed solemnly in their traditional attire. The service was also attended by the city's mayor, Jean-Claude Gaudin, and multiple interfaith leaders, including the Archbishop of Marseille, Georges Pontier.

President of the Comoros was attending the African Union (AU) summit in Sirte, Libya when he heard the news of the crash. Following the crash, he decided to cut short his visit and flew back home to his home country. During a televised address to the nation, he declared a month of national mourning in honour of the victims. The flag of the Comoros would be flown at half-mast and festivals and weddings would be postponed. President Sambi later added that citizens of the Comoros should dress accordingly. The nation's celebrations for its independence, annually celebrated on every July 6, would be toned down in respect to the dead, with the military parade being canceled.

On 11 July, French Prime Minister François Fillon flew to Comoros, the first time a French leader had visited the nation in 23 years, in response to the crash. He met President Sambi to extend his condolences to the Comorians on behalf of France and Nicolas Sarkozy, adding that he would like to "jointly address" all the consequences of the disaster and implement all the necessary means to find the cause and shed full light on it in the interest of the families and safety of air travel. The president of the Comoros stated that he hoped for the strengthening of cooperation, intervention, and further support in combating the nation's "air isolation."

Approximately 181 relatives of the victims were flown to Comoros through a special Boeing 767 Blue Line flight chartered by Yemenia. The flight had taken passengers from Paris before continuing to Marseille and eventually to Moroni. Their arrival was greeted personally by President Sambi and members of the Comorian government. The families would spend a week at the archipelago during a period of mourning.

On 17 September, before the match between Olympique de Marseille and Montpellier HSC, tributes were paid to the victims of Flight 626 in Marseille's Stadion Vélodrome. A minute of silence was then followed by the screening of a short film of the victims. A Comorian flag would later be displayed after the match. A solidarity match between the Marseille football team and the national football team of Comoros would be held at the same place a week later.

=== Burial and repatriation of bodies ===
The national gendarmerrie sent 10 members of its personnel to the Comoros for identification and judicial investigation matters. Members from the Red Crescent assisted in the identification and burial process. In September, a total of 59 bodies of the victims were transported to the Comoros. The identification was hampered due to the decomposing state of the bodies; however, multiple families wanted to bury the victims as soon as possible in a mass burial site in Iconi, Grande Comore. Officials urged family members to wait until the identification process was completed, as families of non-Comorian victims would be repatriated to their respective countries.

The Paris High Court began issuing death certificates for French nationals and Comorians who resided in France and were on the flight. The French Comorian community stated that, due to the state of the Comorian civil register and the fact that some of those on board were not using their real names, it would be extremely difficult to retrieve the documents, which would be essential in the compensation payments. The ambassador in charge of the victims, Christine Robichon, stated that they should contact the Comorian Embassy in France for the matter.

On November 29, the ceremony for the mass burial of the identified victims were held in Iconi. Relatives living in France alongside members of the Comorian consulate were flown to Moroni. The service was attended by approximately 2,500 people, including high-ranking Comorian officials. During an address to the attendees, President Abdallah Sambi stated that the mourning period was already over and therefore there was no need for further funeral ceremonies following the burial.

As of Tuesday, 1 December 2009, remains of nine crew members had been retrieved and arrived in Sanaa. The crew members found were Captain Khaled Hajeb, First Officer Ali Atef, the three Yemeni cabin crew members, the two Moroccan cabin crew members, and the Ethiopian cabin crew member. One cabin crew member, Hamdi Wazea, was buried in Sanaa, while the other Yemenis who were found were buried in Aden. The bodies of the Moroccans were sent to Morocco, while the Ethiopian was sent to Addis Ababa. The crew members who had not been found included Yemeni engineer Ali Salem, the Filipino cabin crew member, and the Indonesian cabin crew member. In the last two days leading to 1 December, 54 bodies were buried in Moroni.

== Controversy ==
=== Protests against Yemenia ===
Hours after the crash, an organisation named "SOS Voyages aux Comores" (SOS Voyages to the Comoros), which had been advocating for safer planes for flights between France and the Comoros, accused French officials of inaction even though they had been warned since months prior, claiming that their warnings had fallen on deaf ears. The organisation had stated that aircraft operated by Yemenia Airways shouldn't have been allowed to be flown in France, arguing that the aircraft that Yemenia had been using were defective and not airworthy. The Comorian community in France stated that they had criticized the low safety standards of Yemenia for years, with the Comorian Consulate in Marseille confirming that they had been receiving numerous complaints about Yemenia flights.

The French Secretary of State for Transport Dominique Bussereau said that France had banned the plane from its territory several years prior, because "we believed it presented a certain number of irregularities in its technical equipment." However, the Yemeni Transport Minister Khaled Ibrahim Alwazir declared the plane was in line with international standards and that "comprehensive inspection" had been undertaken in Yemen with experts from Airbus. Siding with their Yemeni counterpart, Comorian Vice President Idi Nadhoim accused France of withholding crucial information regarding the list of aircraft that posed safety risk, stating that "it would have been easier for us if France had communicated to us the list of Airbus planes that are not good to fly, which is not the case", later claiming that supposedly there were commercial interests at play. French Foreign Minister Bernard Kouchner responded to the criticism by saying that everyone already knew that the plane was banned in France, including the Comorian government themselves.

Protests eventually broke out in Marseille and in Paris as the Comorian community accused Yemenia Airways of poor safety standards. In Marseille Provence Airport, protesters linked arms with each other and prevented passengers from boarding. Barriers were put and the French police were involved to maintain security. Heightened tensions eventually led to a violent clash, with one journalist from AFP being violently attacked and her equipment being slammed onto the floor. Dozens from the Comorian community later scoured through the city to forcefully close several travel agencies that had been selling tickets for Yemenia Airways. Yemenia later cancelled all flights from Marseille to Moroni for an indefinite period due to "force majeure", noting that they could not continue their flights due to deplorable actions which would jeopardize the safety of their passengers, users and staff. Passengers who had booked on Yemenia flights would be refunded immediately. In Paris, during the boarding of a Paris - Sana'a flight, passengers were blocked from checking in and boarding, resulting in around 60 people missing the flight. The same flight eventually had to be delayed for 40 minutes before leaving the airport. The protesters would later continue to travel agencies across Paris to stop them from selling tickets for Yemenia Airways.

The demonstrations stretched until the next few days. Between 10,000 and 30,000 people from the Franco-Comorian community marched in silence from Port d'Paix to Marseille City Hall before reaching the city's Old Port. The attendees were wearing traditional Comorian and carrying banners calling for the boycott of Yemenia Airways. In Paris, around 5,000 people marched in Place de la Republique and Place de la Nation while waving Comorian flags. Remembrance ceremonies were held in La Courneuve and Sarcelles, with mosques holding prayer for the absent. The President of Comoros, Abdallah Sambi, urged the Comorian community in France to remain calm. In response to the growing outrage, Yemenia Airways decided to temporarily suspend all flights from France to Moroni for an indefinite period, citing major risks for the safety of airport staff and passengers of Yemenia. They also announced that they would cancel all additional flights between Sanaa and Moroni. Marie-George Buffet, secretary of the French Communist Party (PCF), however, asked French PM François Fillon to resume the flights between Marseille and Moroni using Air France.

=== Hindering of investigation ===
In response to growing criticism of the safety of Yemenia, a global blacklist of airliners from flying in Europe was proposed by European authorities and the International Civil Aviation Organization (ICAO). The current list didn't include Yemenia Airways as one of the airliners that were banned from flying, though officials stated that the airliner had been under strict surveillance. French authorities stated that Yemenia would need to do significant improvements to avoid being blacklisted. The EU then announced that Yemenia would be expected to implement corrective measures and would be included in the list if by July 10 they had not done the required move. Disappointed with the perceived "unfair" treatment, Yemenia Airways threatened to cancel its $2bn deal with Airbus, stating that they didn't get the "moral support" needed and that Airbus and France had jumped to conclusions regarding the cause of the crash.

Yemeni officials initially did not suspect foul play. , however following "unfair treatment against Yemen", they eventually threw a fresh accusation that the flight had been shot down by a French missile as a military drill was being held in the vicinity of the area during the crash, although recent reports eventually debunked this. Yemeni authorities eventually asked their Comorian counterpart to decode the contents of the flight recorders, the FDR and CVR, in a laboratory other than that of the BEA, the French investigation agency, accusing the French of attacking Yemenia "day and night" and of "harassment". Yemenia stated that the investigation was "affecting the reputation of Yemen". Under pressure from Yemenia, which at the time was regarded as one of the most important airliners in the Comoros, the request was approved by the Comorian authorities, and the recorders were planned to be sent to an NTSB lab in the United States. NTSB, however, refused them. The recorders were eventually read by France's BEA in Le Bourget.

Yemenia and the Yemeni government were accused of hindering the progress of the investigation and evading compensation payments for the families of the victims. During a hearing in Aix-en-Provence, the lawyers of Yemenia and the insurers stated out loud that the case should be postponed, drawing shocked reactions from the relatives. The families later received provisional compensations following further judicial review. It was also suspected that the Comorian authorities were pressured by the Yemeni government from releasing information to the public, causing the investigation to stall. French investigators noted that the most difficult part of the investigation had already been completed, and it was up to the Comorian authorities, who were the main agency responsible for the probe, to publish the report. The BEA, the French government and the victims' families criticized the slow pace of the investigation. At one point, French Foreign Minister Alain Juppé sent a letter to a French-Comorian representatives, stating "a completely abnormal and shocking situation", describing the progress of the investigation which had been on a standstill since September 2009. The French Ministry of Transport openly deplored the Comorian counterpart for their lack of cooperation.

Distrust with the operation of Yemenia led the Comorian diaspora to try persuading Air Austral, an airliner based on the nearby French department of Réunion, to open a direct flight from France to the Comoros. Air Austral was interested and had held talks with Comorian officials regarding the operation of the flight. However, Comorian officials offered fuel prices that were "too high" for the airline to afford, and they eventually had to withdraw their intention. A French member of parliament questioned about whether Yemenia was asked with the same price, but no answer was received. President of the France-Comoros friendship group, Daniel Goldberg, stated that Comoros was likely pressured by Yemen due to economic leverages. In 1999, Yemenia had signed an agreement with the Comorian President Azali Assoumani for the rights of operating the majority of the flights in the country, following the bankruptcy of the country's flag carrier, Air Comores.

As there were calls for the inclusion of Yemenia into the EU list of banned airliners, a review was conducted. The European Union concluded that the efforts made by Yemenia following earlier warnings were enough and acknowledged. Accordingly, the airline was allowed to fly in European skies. In 2014, the airline was allowed by the French Directorate of General Aviation to reopen the Paris - Marseille - Sana'a route, replacing Air Madagascar that had been serving the route following Yemenia's absence, drawing condemnations from the French Comorian community.

== Investigation ==
The National Civil Aviation and Meteorological Agency (ANACM) of the Comoros was in charge of the investigation. The French Bureau of Enquiry and Analysis for Civil Aviation Safety (BEA) sent an investigative team, accompanied by Airbus specialists, to assist in the investigation of the causes. Yemen also sent a technical team to Moroni, while a committee, headed by the Yemeni Minister of Transport, was formed. The BEA noted that due to corrosion damage on the memory cards, not all of the data from the CVR could be recovered.

In 2011, the BEA criticized the Comorian authorities, saying that they are not releasing the report in a timely enough manner. A preliminary report was eventually published in 2011. The report only stated an already known and established facts from the crash, though several findings of the investigation pointed to pilot error as the cause of the accident, bringing objections from the Yemeni authorities. In one of its commentaries regarding the draft report, Yemeni authorities argued that the investigation commission should "carefully consider" the possibility of external forces causing the plane to be brought down, stating that they should've recovered the rudder of the aircraft first before making conclusions.

In 2013, the Yemeni government decided to reopen the investigation, as previous attempts were hindered by the political crisis in the country. A group consisted of high-ranking officials was established and a visit to the Comoros for collaboration with Comorian investigators was planned. Yemeni Minister of Transport Wa'ed Abdullah Badhib stated that the result of the investigation would be published to the public in a clear and transparent manner.

=== Approach to Moroni ===
External videos
- Simulation of Flight 626
- FDR recording of Flight 626 on YouTube

The flight was initially planned for an instrument (ILS) approach to Runway 02, but strong winds forced the crew to switch to Runway 20, which required a circling manoeuvre northwest of the airport to line up with the runway visually. The flight recorders later showed that during the circling the approach became unstable: the aircraft repeatedly descended too low, triggering the Ground Proximity Warning System (GPWS), and drifted off the prescribed track. According to the investigation, a strong tailwind increased the aircraft's groundspeed. The unlit approach beacons, combined with a dark, moonless night and the general lack of lighting, meant the crew missed the point at which they were to turn back toward the runway, and the aircraft flew wide of the published circling track.

During the circling, the aircraft descended below the published minimum altitude, reaching about 161 ft above the sea, and the GPWS generated repeated "sink rate," "pull up," and "too low terrain" warnings. The crew arrested each descent manually but did not carry out the go-around procedure required in response to a "pull up" warning. The commission listed this failure to apply the procedure among the factors contributing to the accident.

With the aircraft configured for landing, the airspeed was held relatively low. The crew eventually decided to increase thrust. Several minutes later, while climbing away, the FDR recorded that one of the pilots had set the selected altitude to 0 ft, which, by design, caused the autothrottle to reduce thrust to idle and the autopilot to lower the nose. The airspeed began to decay. This went unnoticed by the crew, who then retracted the slats, further reducing the wing's lift.

The crew then disengaged the autopilot. Because it had been holding the nose down, disengaging it allowed the nose to rise again, and the airspeed decreased further toward the stall. The aircraft began to buffet and to roll from side to side. As the angle of attack increased, the Airbus A310's alpha floor protection activated and commanded maximum (TO/GA) thrust. Because the engines are mounted beneath the wings, this rapid thrust increase produced a strong nose-up pitching moment. The crew did not counter it with a nose-down input, and the nose pitched up further, deepening the stall. The aircraft struck the Indian Ocean at 185 knots in a nose-up attitude of about 15 degrees.

=== Pilot error ===
The abrupt runway change increased the crew's workload and, the commission found, left them more prone to error during the approach. While manoeuvring to line up with Runway 20, one of the pilots repeatedly set the altitude-select knob to 0 ft. Investigators concluded that this was most likely an inadvertent input, the pilot intending to adjust the heading using the adjacent heading knob. The investigation identified this error as significant to the accident. Already under stress from the difficult approach, the crew made the same misselection again while increasing thrust to climb away: the selected altitude was set to 0 ft, and the aircraft's automation steadily reduced engine thrust to idle and lowered the nose. This was not noticed by the crew, and the airspeed decreased. The aircraft descended and triggered the GPWS, adding to the crew's saturation.

As the airspeed fell toward the stall, the stall warning activated. The recorders show the aircraft's bank angle diverging, rolling left and right, and the commission considered that the crew's attention was largely absorbed by controlling the roll. With multiple warnings sounding, the crew became increasingly overloaded and did not maintain airspeed. When the alpha floor protection activated, the resulting thrust increase pitched the nose up to as much as 27 degrees. The manufacturer's procedure required a nose-down input to recover, which the crew did not make; the FDR recorded continued nose-up elevator inputs until the end of the recording. The commission proposed two explanations: that the crew was reluctant to push the nose down while flying very low over the sea, or that they were overwhelmed by the situation and the multiple alarms. With no nose-down input applied, the aircraft remained stalled until it struck the water.

=== Other deficiencies ===
The investigation listed several things in the report that were noted as significant deficiencies, including the lack of documentation of the pilots' training, the absence of briefing prior to the approach, and the non-existence of a search and rescue team in Moroni Airport, the Comoros' busiest airport and main gateway into the country.

The investigation noted that while the training documents for First Officer Atef were adequate, the ones for Captain Hajeb were incomplete. Moroni Airport was listed by Yemenia as a category C aerodrome, which required specific training before pilots were allowed to land. Hajeb's file didn't include the specific training.

Investigators further criticized several lapses within Yemenia's training program. Numerous procedures established by the airline were not followed by the crew. On one occasion, the airline's standard operating procedure explicitly stated that pilots should immediately go around when GPWS got activated during nighttime flying. Pilots were also not allowed to fly below the published minima. In Flight 626, the crew decided to proceed despite GPWS activation and flew to as low as 161 ft, far below the minimum descent altitude of 1,230 ft. The findings suggested that it was likely that there was lax implementation of the company's safety procedures. Yemeni authorities, however, argued that they had followed the aviation industry standard and that their training programmes were of high quality.

The report also noted the Comoros' lack of search and rescue capability. As the country didn't possess adequate search and rescue facilities, investigators noted that this might've affected the survivability of the survivors, causing them to not be rescued in time. As a result, the investigation recommended Comorian authorities to establish permanent search and rescue resources at the aerodrome.

=== Conclusion ===
The investigation determined that the accident was caused by the inappropriate actions of the crew that led to a stall from which the aircraft did not recover. The approach was unstabilized, triggering various alarms for ground proximity, aircraft configuration and approach to stall. The crew was focused on navigating, were stressed, and did not respond adequately to the different alarms. Contributing to the accident were the windy weather conditions, a lack of training, the lack of a crew briefing before the flight, and a failure to correctly respond to the pull up alarm.

A group of victims' family members called for a demonstration in Paris on 28 June 2013 to protest the final report.

== Aftermath ==
=== Legacy ===
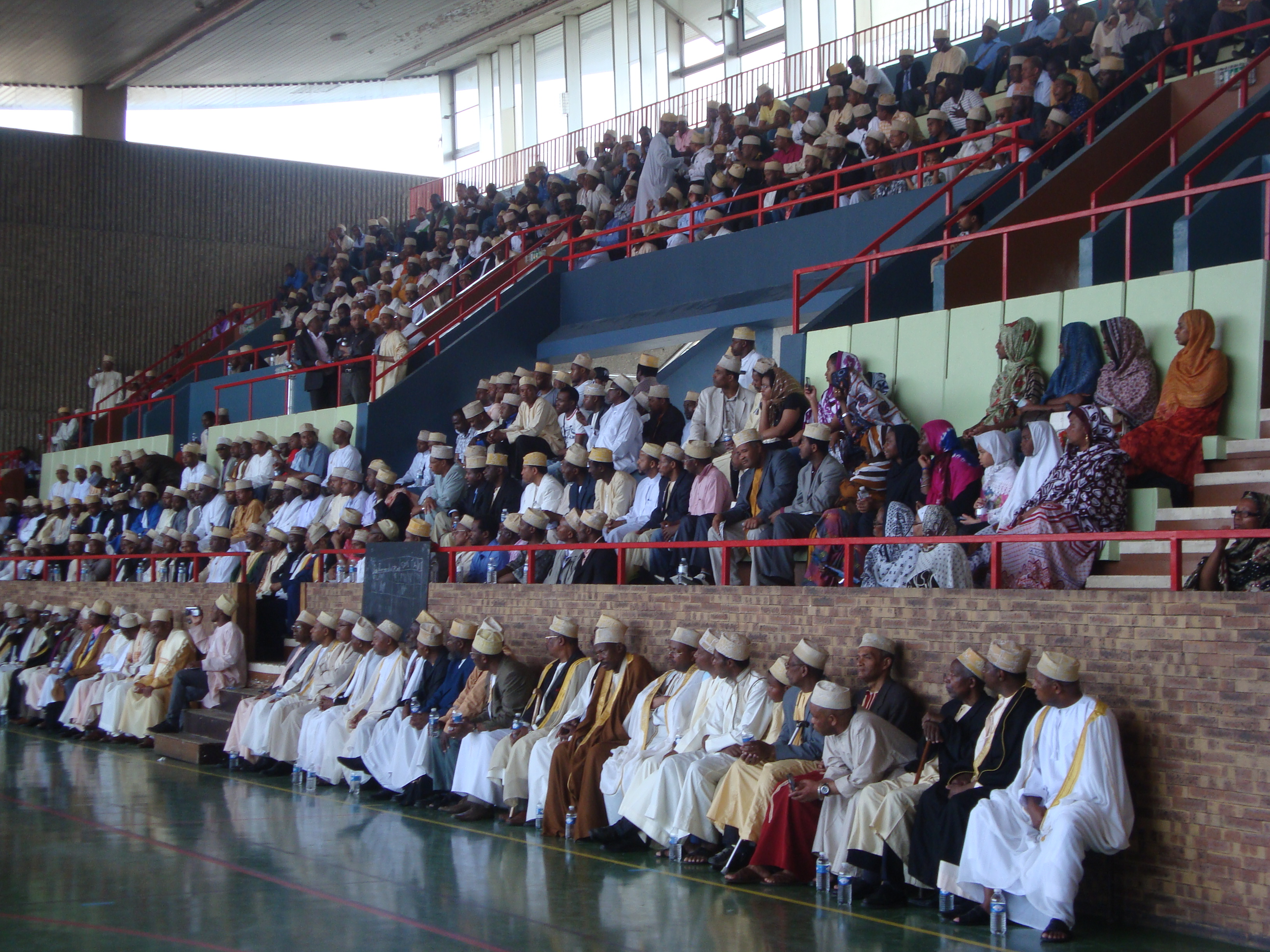
A one-year commemoration of the crash, held by the French Comoran community in Paris

The crash of Flight 626 remains the deadliest aviation disaster in the history of the Comoros, exceeding the toll of Ethiopian Airlines Flight 961. The tragedy was also among the country's deadliest modern disasters. Annual remembrance ceremonies have been held in both the Comoros and France.

A memorial dedicated to the victims of the disaster was planned to be built near Mitsamiouli, which was near the location of the crash. The construction would be financed by France, per the order from then-President Nicolas Sarkozy. On the second anniversary of the disaster, the monument was inaugurated by the French ambassador to Comoros, Luc Hallade. The memorial was a decorated stone-wall structure with reflective plaques bearing the names of the 152 victims, located at the entrance of the city.

In the aftermath of the crash, Comorian authorities vowed to make improvements in the safety of their airports. During a press conference in 2019, they stated that numerous safety measures had been implemented at Moroni Airport and that they were already at the final stages for certification of international standards. Within the same statements, officials announced that the airport had finally established a rescue team.

=== Trial ===
The French Federation of Insurance Companies (FFSA) stated that the Airbus A310 involved in the crash was insured for approximately US$34 million. Yemenia offered an initial compensations of up to 20,000 euros for the relatives of the victims. The airline, however, didn't specify when the compensations would be given. The ambassadors of Comoros, France and Yemen alongside several French officials met in Paris and agreed to set the compensations at 20,000 euros. However, payments were not made and many families didn't receive any compensations for the next few years. Yemenia was accused of attempting to skirt away from the payments, which led to condemnations.

A series of complaints were officially filed into French courts to settle the matter. In May 2010, the High Court of Aix-en-Provence declared that a provisional compensation of up to 3.4 million euros would be made, which would be distributed among 50 beneficiaries. In 2015, the Aix-en-Provence High Court had ruled in favor of the families of the victims, ordering Yemenia and its insurers to pay compensations of up to 30 million euros which would distributed among 600 beneficiaries. The lawyers representing the relatives had sought the penalty of 70 million euros, but considered the ruling to be satisfactory. Months after the ruling, however, multiple families claimed that they still had not received the planned compensations.

The Paris Criminal Court opened the case against Yemenia in May 2022 for manslaughter. A total of 560 relatives had joined the plaintiffs to make the case. Representatives from Yemenia Airways, however, were never present since the start of the trial due to the civil war situation in the country. The proceedings would be open to the public, with parts of it broadcast to Marseille residents. The families sought compensation of up to €225,000 per person. Yemenia insisted upon their innocence, stating that while there were malfunctions, the company was not responsible for the events that led to the crash. Bahia Bakari personally attended the trial and testified for the relatives later on. The judges eventually indicted Yemenia for involuntary homicide and sentenced the airline to the maximum fine. Yemenia Airways stated that they would appeal the verdict.

The Court of Appeal opened a case following Yemenia's decision to appeal the prior verdict in 2022. The trial was attended by one of the executives of the company, who maintained their innocence. The court decided to uphold the conviction of the airline and stated that they would add supplementary penalty.

== See also ==
- Air France Flight 447
- China Airlines Flight 140
