= Agence Nationale de l'Aviation Civile et de la Météorologie =

Agence Nationale de l'Aviation Civile et de la Météorologie may refer to:

- Agence Nationale de l'Aviation Civile et de la Météorologie (Comoros)
- Agence Nationale de l'Aviation Civile et de la Météorologie (Senegal)
