= Air Comores =

Flag carrier of the Comoros (1966–1995)

IATA	ICAO	Call sign
—	—	AIR COMORES
- Founded: 1966
- Ceased operations: 1995
- Destinations: 5
- Parent company: Air France
- Headquarters: Moroni
- Key people: Djamal Eddeine Ahmed

Air Comores SA was the flag carrier of the Comoros that operated from 1966 to 1995. The airline was 49% owned by Air France, with the remaining 51% owned by the Comorian state.

== History ==
Air Comores was founded in 1966 as a charter operator. The airline began service with a Piper PA-23 Aztec B and a Piper PA-23 Apache 160 on routes within the Comoros Islands. The airline then procured two De Havilland D.H.114 from the French carrier UTA. The airline continued to expand its fleet by acquiring two Douglas DC-6s and two Douglas DC-3s. In the early 1970s the airline added two Nord 262s to the fleet. The airline ceased operations in 1974.

In 1975 the airline re-started under a new name, Société Nationale des Transport Aériens and began operations with four Douglas DC-4s. By the late 1980s the carriers fleet included a Boeing 737-200 (leased from South African Airways) and a Fokker F27 Friendship. The airline operated the same route network from the previous Air Comores. By 1995 the airlines fleet included one Fokker F27, three Douglas DC-4s and a Boeing 737-200. However by September of the same year the airline ceased operations after the company failed to pay its debt.

== Destinations ==
The airlines route network remained basically unchanged throughout its entire existence:

=== Africa ===
- Comoros
  - Anjouan – Ouani Airport
  - Mohéli – Mohéli Bandar Es Eslam Airport
  - Moroni – Prince Said Ibrahim International Airport
- France
  - Dzaoudzi – Dzaoudzi–Pamandzi International Airport
- Tanzania
  - Dar es Salaam – Julius Nyerere International Airport

== Fleet ==
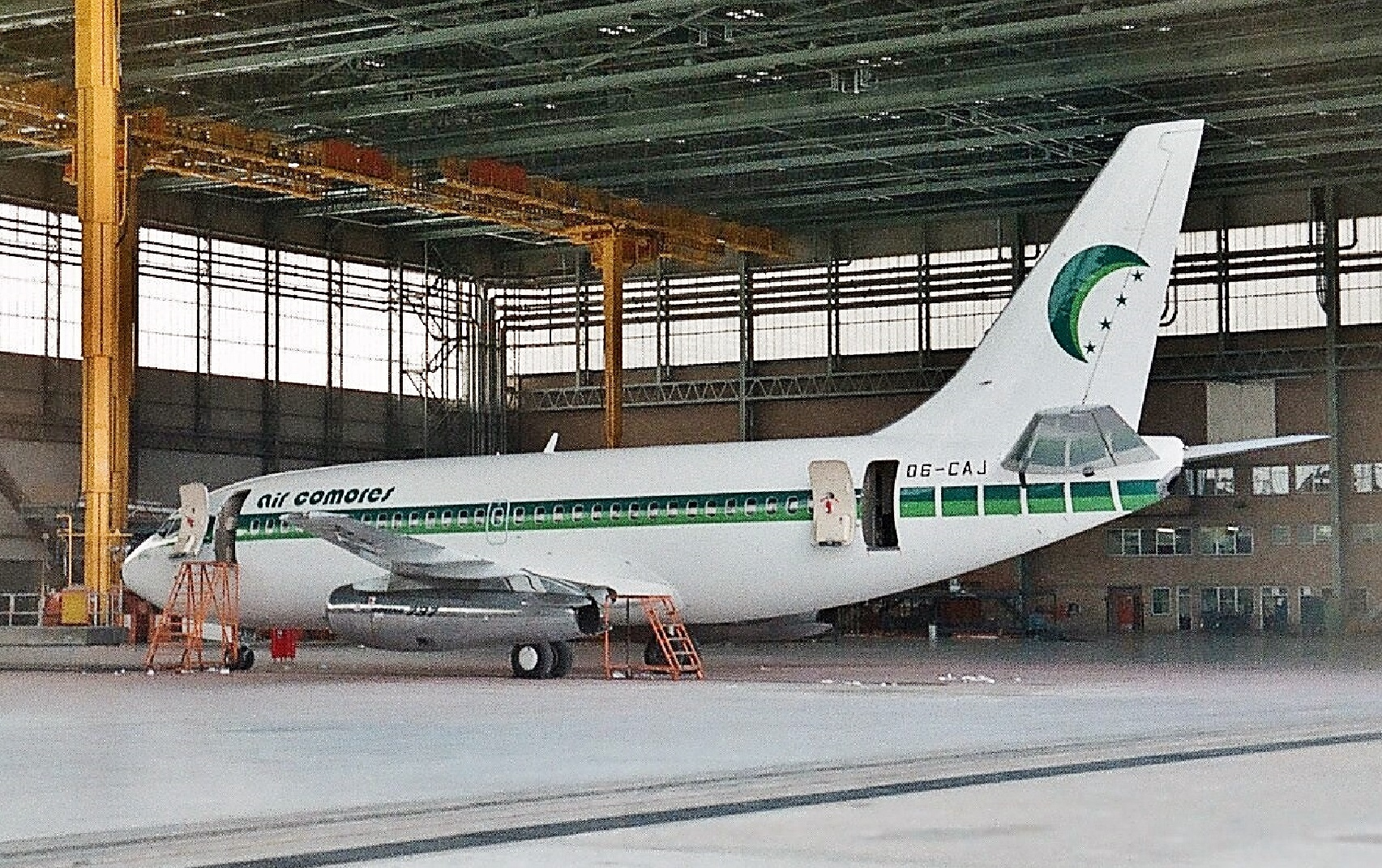
An Air Comores Boeing 737-200 at Johannesburg Airport, 1984

The Air Comores fleet by 1995 consisted of the following aircraft:

- 1 Boeing 737-200
- 1 Fokker F.27
- 4 Douglas DC-4

== See also ==
- List of defunct airlines of the Comoros
