= Hahaya-Aéroport =

Coordinates: 11.536667°S 43.271389°E

- Village
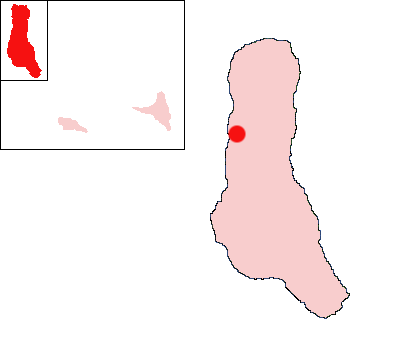
- Location of Hahaya-Aéroport on the island of Grande Comore
- Country: Comoros
- Island: Grande Comore

Government
  - Député: Oumour Mmadi Hassane

Population (2016)
  - Total: 5,143
- Time zone: UTC+3 (EAT)

Hahaya-Aéroport is a village on the island of Grande Comore (Ngazidja) in the Comoros. According to the 2016 census, the village had a population of 5,143.

Hahaya is the location of Prince Said Ibrahim International Airport, the main airport serving the Comoros.
