= List of airlines of the Comoros =

This is a list of airlines currently operating in the Comoros. As of 2025, R-Komor operating a Fokker 50 is the only Comorian airline.

Airline	IATA	ICAO	Callsign	Image	Founded
R-Komor					2018

== See also ==
- List of airlines
- List of defunct airlines of the Comoros
- List of companies based in the Comoros
