= Comoro Islands Airline =

Airline based in the Comoros (2008–2010)

| IATA | ICAO | Call sign |
|---|---|---|
| - | CIN | VANILLA |
- Founded: 2008
- Ceased operations: 2010
- Operating bases: Prince Said Ibrahim International Airport
- Fleet size: 1
- Headquarters: Moroni, Comoros

Comoro Islands Airline was a start-up airline based in the Comoros.

== History ==
The airline launched with flights between the islands of the archipelago made its first flight on 6 October 2009. The airline in association with Bahrain Air, flew the first inaugural international flight to Jeddah to take pilgrims to the Hajj in 2009.

The airline was established under an initiative between Kuwait and the Comoros government under the former President Ahmed Abdallah Mohamed Sambi, in response to a need for greater safety, frequency and the highest standards for an increasing number business and vacationing traffic to and from islands in the Indian Ocean. The Aref Group with international partners were working towards the full international scheduled operations of the Comoro Islands Airline. Based in Moroni, Comoros with service centres planned for launch in 2010 to serve East Africa and the Gulf. The airline was operational in 2009 serving the islands via Prince Said Ibrahim International Airport on Grande Comore, Ouani Airport on Anjouan and Mohéli Bandar Es Eslam Airport. The company slogan is With Love.

== Fleet ==
The Comoro Islands Airline fleet included the following aircraft (at 9 April 2010):

- 1 Airbus A320-214 (operating for Sudan Airways)
- 1 Beechcraft 1900 operated by Fair Aviation for inter-island services
