= Comores Aviation International =

IATA	ICAO	Call sign
O5	KMZ	Comores Aviation International
- Founded: 1996
- Ceased operations: 2011
- Hubs: Prince Said Ibrahim International Airport
- Secondary hubs: Ouani Airport
- Fleet size: 6
- Destinations: 7
- Headquarters: Moroni, Comoros
- Website: comoresaviation.com

Comores Aviation International (Compagnie Aérienne de l'Union des iles Comores) was the flag carrier of the Comoros. It was privately owned and operates domestic scheduled services, as well as charters mainly to tourist destinations in southern and eastern Africa. Its main base was Prince Said Ibrahim International Airport, Moroni, with a hub at Ouani Airport.

== History ==
The airline was established in 1996 and started operations in 1997. It is owned by Jean-Marc Heintz (President) (70%) and Batouli Heintz (General Manager) (30%) and has 82 employees (at March 2007).

== Destinations ==
Comores Aviation operates scheduled services to the following destinations (as of March 2009):

- Comoros:
  - Anjouan (Ouani Airport) Secondary Hub
  - Moroni (Prince Said Ibrahim International Airport) Hub
- French Overseas Collectivity (Mayotte)
  - Dzaoudzi (Dzaoudzi Pamandzi International Airport)
- Madagascar
  - Antananarivo (Ivato Airport)
  - Mahajanga (Amborovy Airport)
- Tanzania
  - Dar Es Salaam (Julius Nyerere International Airport)
  - Zanzibar (Kisauni Airport)

== Fleet ==
The Comores Aviation fleet includes the following aircraft (at March 2009):

- 1 Embraer 120
- 2 Let Turbolet 410
- 3 BAe 146-200

=== Previously operated ===
At August 2006 the airline also operated:

- 1 BAe 748 Series 2B (leased from Executive Aerospace of South Africa)
