= Air Service Comores =

2010s airline in the Comoros

IATA	ICAO	Call sign
-	-	-
- Founded: 1996
- Ceased operations: 2016
- Fleet size: 2
- Website: http://airservicecomores.com/ (defunct)

Air Service Comores was a small airline which served to transport people and cargo between the three islands of the Comoros, as well as the nearby island of Mayotte.

== Fleet ==
As of August 2006 the Air Service Comores fleet included:

- 2 Let L-410 UVP

== Banned in the EU ==
All but 1 L-410 are on the List of air carriers banned in the EU.

== See also ==
- List of defunct airlines of the Comoros
