= Mohéli Bandar Es Eslam Airport =

Mohéli Bandar Es Salam Airport
- IATA: NWA; ICAO: FMCI

Summary
- Airport type: Public
- Location: Mohéli, Comoros
- Elevation AMSL: 46 ft / 14 m
- Coordinates: 12°17′53″S 043°45′59″E

Map
- Location in the Comoros

Runways
Direction	Length		Surface
Direction	m	ft	Surface
13/31	1,300	4,265	Asphalt

Mohéli Bandar Es Salam Airport (IATA: NWA, ICAO: FMCI) is an airport in Mohéli, Comoros. It is the third largest airport in Comoros after Moroni's Prince Said Ibrahim International Airport and Anjouan's Ouani Airport.
