= National Civil Aviation and Meteorological Agency (Comoros) =

Meteorological agency of Comoros

The National Civil Aviation and Meteorological Agency of the Union of the Comoros (ANACM French: Agence Nationale de l'Aviation Civile et de la Météorologie de l'Union des Comores) is the civil aviation authority of the Comoros. It is also in charge of investigating aviation accidents and incidents. Its head office is in Moroni.

== See also ==
- Yemenia Flight 626
