= Prince Said Ibrahim International Airport =

Prince Said Ibrahim International Airport Moroni Hahaya International Airport
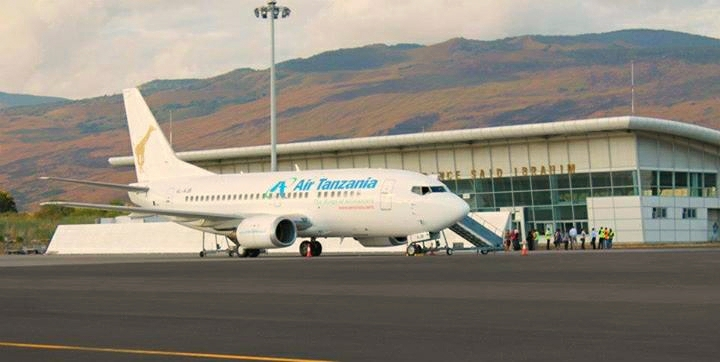
- Air Tanzania B737 at the airport
- IATA: HAH; ICAO: FMCH

Summary
- Airport type: Public
- Serves: Moroni
- Location: Hahaya, Comoros
- Hub for: Comores Aviation
- Elevation AMSL: 28 m / 92 ft
- Coordinates: 11°32′12″S 43°16′17″E

Map
- Location of airport in Comoros HAH (Indian Ocean)

Runways
Direction	Length		Surface
Direction	m	ft	Surface
02/20	2,900	9,514	Asphalt

Prince Said Ibrahim International Airport (IATA: HAH, ICAO: FMCH) (French: Aéroport international Moroni Prince Saïd Ibrahim, Arabic: مطار الأمير سعيد إبراهيم الدولي, AIMPSI) is an international airport serving Moroni in Comoros. It is named after Prince Saïd Ibrahim. It is located north of the village of Hahaya.

== Airlines and destinations ==
Airlines	Destinations
Air Austral	Saint-Denis de la Réunion
Air Tanzania	Dar es Salaam
Ethiopian Airlines	Addis Ababa
Ewa Air	Dzaoudzi
Kenya Airways	Nairobi–Jomo Kenyatta
Precision Air	Anjouan, Dar es Salaam
Turkish Airlines^{1}	Seasonal: Istanbul

Notes

^1: Turkish Airlines's flight from Moroni to Istanbul stops in Seychelles, but the airline does not have fifth freedom rights on the SEZ – HAH sector.

== Accidents and incidents ==
- On 23 November 1996, Ethiopian Airlines Flight 961, a Boeing 767-200ER flying from Addis Ababa to Abidjan with several stopovers was hijacked over Ethiopia by three Ethiopians seeking asylum in Australia. The plane crash-landed in the water three hours later when it ran out of fuel. 125 of the 175 passengers and crew were killed, including the three hijackers. The pilot's initial decision to land at the airport was thwarted due to the fuel starvation.
- On 30 June 2009, Yemenia Flight 626, flying from Yemen to Moroni crashed into the Indian Ocean while on final approach to the airport. 152 out of the 153 people on board were killed.
- On 27 November 2012 an Int'Air Îles Embraer EMB 120ER Brasilia (registration number D6-HUA) was underway from Moroni to Anjouan (both in Comoros Islands) on a charter flight with 25 passengers and 4 crew, when after taking off from Moroni's Prince Said Ibrahim International Airport it lost height, and while attempting to return to the airport, waterlanded 200 meters off the coast, about 5 km north of the airport. Local fishermen rescued everybody on board. There were only minor injuries.
